= List of 20th-century writers =

This is a partial list of 20th-century writers. This list includes notable artists, authors, philosophers, playwrights, poets, scientists and other important and noteworthy contributors to literature. The two most basic written literary categories include fiction and non fiction.

== A ==
- Edward Abbey
- Kōbō Abe
- Chinua Achebe
- Kathy Acker
- Forrest J. Ackerman
- Peter Ackroyd
- Douglas Adams
- Richard Adams
- Lucia H. Faxon Additon
- Mirza Adeeb
- Adunis
- John Agard
- Chandrashekhar Agashe
- James Agee
- Samuel Agnon
- Ama Ata Aidoo
- Conrad Aiken
- Anna Akhmatova
- Ryūnosuke Akutagawa
- Alain-Fournier
- Edward Albee
- Rafael Alberti
- Richard Aldington
- Julia Carter Aldrich
- Sholom Aleichem
- Sherman Alexie
- Nelson Algren
- Woody Allen
- Isabel Allende
- Eunice Gibbs Allyn
- Julia Alvarez
- Jorge Amado
- Eric Ambler
- Stephen E. Ambrose
- Yehuda Amichai
- Kingsley Amis
- Martin Amis
- A. R. Ammons
- Regina M. Anderson
- Sherwood Anderson
- V. C. Andrews
- Ivo Andrić
- Roger Angell
- Maya Angelou
- Gabriele d'Annunzio
- A. Manette Ansay
- Piers Anthony
- Guillaume Apollinaire
- Louis Aragon
- Jeffrey Archer
- Hannah Arendt
- Sarah Louise Arnold
- Antonin Artaud
- Sholem Asch
- John Ashbery
- Isaac Asimov
- Miguel Ángel Asturias
- Diana Athill
- Kate Atkinson
- Margaret Atwood
- W. H. Auden
- Jean M. Auel
- Paul Auster

== B ==
- Elnora Monroe Babcock
- Isaak Babel
- Richard Bach
- Ingeborg Bachmann
- Howard Bahr
- Beryl Bainbridge
- Larry Baker
- Nicholson Baker
- James Baldwin
- J. G. Ballard
- Melissa Bank
- Iain Banks
- John Banville
- Nick Bantock
- Amiri Baraka
- Alessandro Baricco
- Clive Barker
- Annie Maria Barnes
- Djuna Barnes
- Julian Barnes
- Margaret Ayer Barnes
- J. M. Barrie
- John Barth
- Donald Barthelme
- Roland Barthes
- Georges Bataille
- Margret Holmes Bates
- Emma Pow Bauder
- L. Frank Baum
- Christian Bauman
- Peter S. Beagle
- Clara Bancroft Beatley
- Ann Beattie
- Sally Beauman
- Samuel Beckett
- Max Beerbohm
- Adaline Hohf Beery
- Brendan Behan
- Madison Smartt Bell
- Hilaire Belloc
- Saul Bellow
- Jacinto Benavente
- Peter Benchley
- Robert Benchley
- Mario Benedetti
- Emma Lee Benedict
- Hester A. Benedict
- Stephen Vincent Benét
- Arnold Bennett
- John Berger
- Thomas Berger
- Henri Bergson
- Thomas Bernhard
- John Berryman
- Alfred Bester
- Mongo Beti
- Doris Betts
- Hayim Nahman Bialik
- Elizabeth Biddulph, Baroness Biddulph
- Ella A. Bigelow
- Jennie M. Bingham
- Adolfo Bioy Casares
- Elizabeth Bishop
- Emily Montague Mulkin Bishop
- Andrei Bitov
- Suessa Baldridge Blaine
- Maurice Blanchot
- Clair Blank
- Emily Rose Bleby
- Karen Blixen
- Alexander Blok
- Allan Bloom
- Harold Bloom
- Judy Blume
- Elizabeth Baker Bohan
- Roberto Bolaño
- Yves Bonnefoy
- Jorge Luis Borges
- Tadeusz Borowski
- Elizabeth Bowen
- Paul Bowles
- William Boyd
- Kay Boyle
- T. Coraghessan Boyle
- Brada
- Ray Bradbury
- Anna Braden
- Marion Zimmer Bradley
- Gillian Bradshaw
- John Braine
- Adelia Pope Branham
- Fernand Braudel
- Richard Brautigan
- Marion Howard Brazier
- Bertolt Brecht
- André Breton
- Eve Brodlique
- Joseph Brodsky
- Louis Bromfield
- Rupert Brooke
- Gwendolyn Brooks
- Terry Brooks
- Alice Williams Brotherton
- Martha A. Boughton
- Dan Brown
- Dee Brown
- Eva Maria Brown
- Gertrude Dorsey Brown
- Martin Buber
- John Buchan
- Frank Buck
- Pearl S. Buck
- William F. Buckley, Jr.
- Frederick Buechner
- Lois McMaster Bujold
- Charles Bukowski
- Mikhail Bulgakov
- Emma Bull
- Ivan Bunin
- Basil Bunting
- Anthony Burgess
- James Lee Burke
- Emeline S. Burlingame
- Edgar Rice Burroughs
- William S. Burroughs
- Clementina Butler
- Octavia Butler
- Michel Butor
- Dino Buzzati
- A.S. Byatt

== C ==
- Guillermo Cabrera Infante
- James M. Cain
- Erskine Caldwell
- Italo Calvino
- Margaret Cameron
- John W. Campbell
- Joseph Campbell
- Albert Camus
- Matilde Camus
- Elias Canetti
- Truman Capote
- Orson Scott Card
- Jan Carew
- Peter Carey
- Robert Caro
- Alejo Carpentier
- Jonathan Carroll
- Rachel Carson
- Angela Carter
- Barbara Cartland
- Raymond Carver
- Joyce Cary
- Carlos Castaneda
- Rosario Castellanos
- Willa Cather
- Sarah Caudwell
- Constantine P. Cavafy
- Edgar Cayce
- Camilo José Cela
- Paul Celan
- Louis-Ferdinand Céline
- Blaise Cendrars
- Elizabeth Chadwick
- Raymond Chandler
- René Char
- Bruce Chatwin
- John Cheever
- Kelly Cherry
- C. J. Cherryh
- G. K. Chesterton
- Tracy Chevalier
- Lee Child
- Erskine Childers
- Irma Chilton
- Noam Chomsky
- Agatha Christie
- Nicholas Christopher
- Daria Chubata
- Eugenia Chuprina
- Winston Churchill
- Carolyn Chute
- Tom Clancy
- Fanny Clar
- Arthur C. Clarke
- Kenneth Clark
- Mary Higgins Clark
- Walter Van Tilburg Clark
- Paul Claudel
- James Clavell
- Beverly Cleary
- Eldridge Cleaver
- Ethlyn T. Clough
- Harlan Coben
- Sarah Johnson Cocke
- Jean Cocteau
- Jonathan Coe
- J. M. Coetzee
- Leonard Cohen
- Yolande Cohen
- H. Maria George Colby
- Isabel Colegate
- Alice Blanchard Coleman
- Colette
- John Collier
- Jackie Collins
- Laurie Colwin
- Michael Connelly
- Joseph Conrad
- Pat Conroy
- Thomas B. Costain
- Robin Cook
- Glenn Cooper
- Robert Coover
- Cid Corman
- Bernard Cornwell
- Gregory Corso
- Julio Cortázar
- Jayne Cortez
- Thomas B. Costain
- Douglas Coupland
- Bryce Courtenay
- Noël Coward
- James Gould Cozzens
- Jim Crace
- Sara Jane Crafts
- Hart Crane
- Robert Creeley
- René Crevel
- Michael Crichton
- Quentin Crisp
- A.J. Cronin
- Harry Crosby
- Aleister Crowley
- John Crowley
- Anne Virginia Culbertson
- Belle Caldwell Culbertson
- Countee Cullen
- E. E. Cummings
- Michael Cunningham
- Martha E. Sewall Curtis
- Nannie Webb Curtis
- Clive Cussler

== D ==
- Roald Dahl
- Sandra Dallas
- Tsitsi Dangarembga
- Cora Linn Daniels
- Edwidge Danticat
- Rubén Darío
- Iris Rainer Dart
- Mahmoud Darwish
- Russell Davenport
- Robertson Davies
- Angela Davis
- H. L. Davis
- Lydia Davis
- Richard Harding Davis
- Osamu Dazai
- Samuel R. Delany
- Simone de Beauvoir
- Louis de Bernières
- Len Deighton
- Charles de Lint
- Antoine de Saint-Exupéry
- Bhabananda Deka
- Nalini Prava Deka
- Miguel Delibes
- Don DeLillo
- Nelson DeMille
- Anita Desai
- Robert Desnos
- Pete Dexter
- Anita Diamant
- Philip K. Dick
- James Dickey
- Joan Didion
- Annie Le Porte Diggs
- Pietro di Donato
- Annie Dillard
- Chitra Banerjee Divakaruni
- Stephen Dixon
- Alfred Döblin
- Louisa Emily Dobrée
- E. L. Doctorow
- Anna Bowman Dodd
- Harriet Doerr
- Stephen R. Donaldson
- J. P. Donleavy
- Michael Dorris
- Ella Loraine Dorsey
- John Dos Passos
- Fyodor Dostoevsky
- Sara Douglass
- Rita Dove
- Alice Mary Dowd
- Arthur Conan Doyle
- Theodore Dreiser
- Allen Drury
- W. E. B. Du Bois
- Andre Dubus III
- John Dufresne
- Daphne du Maurier
- David James Duncan
- Helen Dunmore
- Dorothy Dunnett
- John Dunning
- Will Durant
- Marguerite Duras
- Friedrich Dürrenmatt
- Gerina Dunwich
- Bohdana Durda
- Émile Durkheim
- Ella Hamilton Durley
- Gerald Durrell
- Lawrence Durrell
- Bob Dylan

== E ==
- Mary Tracy Earle
- Roger Ebert
- José Echegaray
- Umberto Eco
- David Eddings
- E. R. Eddison
- David Edgar
- Helen Edmundson
- Russell Edson
- Helen Merrill Egerton
- Ilya Ehrenburg
- Albert Einstein
- Mircea Eliade
- T. S. Eliot
- Stanley Elkin
- Bret Easton Ellis
- Havelock Ellis
- Harlan Ellison
- Ralph Ellison
- James Ellroy
- Paul Éluard
- Odysseas Elytis
- James Emanuel
- Buchi Emecheta
- Nora Ephron
- Joseph Epstein
- Louise Erdrich
- Barbara Erskine
- Laura Esquivel
- Rudolf Christoph Eucken
- Nicholas Evans
- Lizzie P. Evans-Hansell
- Elizabeth Hawley Everett
- Nellie Blessing Eyster

== F ==
- Hans Fallada
- John Fante
- Nuruddin Farah
- Abdul Haque Faridi
- Richard Fariña
- Philip José Farmer
- J. G. Farrell
- James T. Farrell
- Howard Fast
- William Faulkner
- Raymond Feist
- Mary Fels
- Edna Ferber
- Lawrence Ferlinghetti
- Laura Dayton Fessenden
- Helen Fielding
- Jack Finney
- Ronald Firbank
- F. Scott Fitzgerald
- Penelope Fitzgerald
- Raymond Flanagan
- Martin Flavin
- Ian Fleming
- Michael Flynn
- Dario Fo
- Ken Follett
- Horton Foote
- Edith Willis Linn Forbes
- Ford Madox Ford
- Harriet Ford
- Richard Ford
- C. S. Forester
- E. M. Forster
- Frederick Forsyth
- Jessie Forsyth
- Alan Dean Foster
- Michel Foucault
- Connie May Fowler
- Karen Joy Fowler
- John Fowles
- Paula Fox
- Esther G. Frame
- Anatole France
- Anne Frank
- Viktor Frankl
- Jonathan Franzen
- Michael Frayn
- Charles Frazier
- Pauline Fréchette
- Sigmund Freud
- Betty Friedan
- Bruce Jay Friedman
- Milton Friedman
- Thomas Friedman
- Erich Fromm
- Robert Frost
- Emma Sheridan Fry
- Susanna M. D. Fry
- Agnes Moore Fryberger
- Northrop Frye
- Carlos Fuentes
- Athol Fugard
- Buckminster Fuller
- Alan Furst

== G ==
- Diana Gabaldon
- Carlo Emilio Gadda
- William Gaddis
- Neil Gaiman
- Ernest J. Gaines
- John Kenneth Galbraith
- Dumitru Găleșanu
- Mary Onahan Gallery
- Rómulo Gallegos
- Barbara Galpin
- John Galsworthy
- Mary Ninde Gamewell
- Mahatma Gandhi
- Gao Xingjian
- Jane Gardam
- Erle Stanley Gardner
- John Gardner
- William H. Gass
- Theodor Seuss Geisel (Dr. Seuss)
- David Gemmell
- Jean Genet
- Ella M. George
- Kaye Gibbons
- Stella Gibbons
- Kahlil Gibran
- William Gibson
- André Gide
- Jack Gilbert
- Annie Somers Gilchrist
- Florence Magruder Gilmore
- Allen Ginsberg
- Natalia Ginzburg
- Matthew Giobbi
- Jean Giono
- Nikki Giovanni
- Jean Giraudoux
- Ellen Glasgow
- Louise Glück
- Gail Godwin
- Jyoti Gogte
- John Henry Goldfrap
- William Golding
- Emma Goldman
- Witold Gombrowicz
- Lorna Goodison
- Terry Goodkind
- Allegra Goodman
- Paul Goodman
- Nadine Gordimer
- Mary Gordon
- Noah Gordon
- Maxim Gorky
- Stephen Jay Gould
- William Goyen
- Kenneth Grahame
- Günter Grass
- Mary H. Graves
- Robert Graves
- Charlotte E. Gray
- Gerald Green
- Henry Green
- Julia Boynton Green
- Clement Greenberg
- Cordelia A. Greene
- Frances Nimmo Greene
- Graham Greene
- Lavinia Greenlaw
- Germaine Greer
- Philippa Gregory
- Kate Grenville
- Zane Grey
- W. E. B. Griffin
- John Grisham
- João Guimarães Rosa
- Sandra Gulland
- Nikolay Gumilev
- John Gunther
- George Gurdjieff
- Ivor Gurney
- David Guterson

== H ==
- H.D.
- Arthur Hailey
- Elizabeth Forsythe Hailey
- David Halberstam
- Alex Haley
- James Norman Hall
- Radclyffe Hall
- Edith Hamilton
- Oscar Hammerstein II
- Dashiell Hammett
- Earl Hamner
- Amadou Hampâté Bâ
- Knut Hamsun
- James Hanley
- Lorraine Hansberry
- Elizabeth Hardwick
- Lillian Resler Harford
- Donald Harington
- Ethel Hillyer Harris
- Joanne Harris
- Robert Harris
- Wilson Harris
- Constance Cary Harrison
- Jim Harrison
- Kathryn Harrison
- Alamgir Hashmi
- Alfred Hassler
- Mary R. Platt Hatch
- Gerhart Hauptmann
- Václav Havel
- John Hawkes
- Robert Hayden
- Friedrich Hayek
- Kate Simpson Hayes
- Melinda Haynes
- Shirley Hazzard
- Dermot Healy
- Seamus Heaney
- Roy Heath
- Eliza Putnam Heaton
- Ursula Hegi
- Martin Heidegger
- Robert A. Heinlein
- Joseph Heller
- Lillian Hellman
- Mark Helprin
- Ernest Hemingway
- O. Henry
- Zbigniew Herbert
- Frank Herbert
- James Leo Herlihy
- Michael Herr
- John Hersey
- Hermann Hesse
- Juliette Heuzey
- Emma Churchman Hewitt
- Paul Heyse
- Patricia Highsmith
- Nâzım Hikmet
- Agnes Leonard Hill
- Susan Hill
- James Hilton
- Chester Himes
- Mary Evelyn Hitchcock
- Christopher Hitchens
- Russell Hoban
- Robin Hobb
- Peter Hoeg
- Alice Hoffman
- Robert Holdstock
- Cecelia Holland
- Norah M. Holland
- Lizzie Holmes
- Hilda Mary Hooke
- Nick Hornby
- Corinne Stocker Horton
- Ödön von Horváth
- A. E. Housman
- Elizabeth Jane Howard
- Robert E. Howard
- Emeline Harriet Howe
- Bohumil Hrabal
- L. Ron Hubbard
- William Henry Hudson
- Pauline von Hügel
- Langston Hughes
- Richard Hughes
- Ted Hughes
- Keri Hulme
- E. Howard Hunt
- Florence Huntley
- Zora Neale Hurston
- Sibyl Marvin Huse
- Taha Hussein
- Aldous Huxley

== I-J ==
- David Ignatow
- Marilla Baker Ingalls
- William Inge
- Eugène Ionesco
- Mary E. Ireland
- Kazi Nazrul Islam
- Muhammad Iqbal
- John Irving
- Christopher Isherwood
- Kazuo Ishiguro
- Oksana Ivanenko
- Alice Emma Ives
- Edmond Jabès
- Shirley Jackson
- Max Jacob
- Ada Jafarey
- Henry James
- P. D. James
- William James
- Storm Jameson
- Randall Jarrell
- Elfriede Jelinek
- Theodora R. Jenness
- Ruth Prawer Jhabvala
- Michael Johns
- Orrick Johns
- Linton Kwesi Johnson
- Maria I. Johnston
- Gayl Jones
- James Jones
- Erica Jong
- June Jordan
- Robert Jordan
- Rebecca Richardson Joslin
- Alice Jouenne
- James Joyce
- Mary Catherine Judd
- C.G. Jung
- Ernst Jünger

== K ==
- Pauline Kael
- Franz Kafka
- Shakuntala Karandikar
- Jan Karon
- George S. Kaufman
- Yasunari Kawabata
- Guy Gavriel Kay
- Jackie Kay
- Terry Kay
- Nikos Kazantzakis
- Harry Stephen Keeler
- Eliza D. Keith
- Jonathan Kellerman
- Yaşar Kemal
- Thomas Keneally
- A. L. Kennedy
- William Kennedy
- Lady Amabel Kerr
- Imre Kertész
- Jack Kerouac
- Katharine Kerr
- Ken Kesey
- John Maynard Keynes
- Daniil Kharms
- Joyce Kilmer
- Maria Brace Kimball
- Jamaica Kincaid
- Lily King
- Stephen King
- Barbara Kingsolver
- Maxine Hong Kingston
- Alfred Kinsey
- Velimir Khlebnikov
- Arthur Koestler
- Bernard-Marie Koltès
- Dean Koontz
- Sonya Koshkina
- Jerzy Kosinski
- Jon Krakauer
- Karl Kraus
- William Kent Krueger
- Maxine Kumin
- Milan Kundera
- Stanley Kunitz
- Katherine Kurtz

== L ==
- Louis L'Amour
- Oliver La Farge
- Pär Lagerkvist
- Selma Lagerlöf
- Jhumpa Lahiri
- Harold Lamb
- Wally Lamb
- Anne Lamott
- John Lanchester
- Margaret Landon
- Mary Lewis Langworthy
- Joe R. Lansdale
- Ring Lardner
- Philip Larkin
- Margaret Laurence
- D. H. Lawrence
- T. E. Lawrence
- Halldór Laxness
- Timothy Leary
- John le Carré
- J. M. G. Le Clézio
- Chang-Rae Lee
- Harper Lee
- Stan Lee
- Madeleine L'Engle
- Ursula K. Le Guin
- Michel Leiris
- Mary Sinton Leitch
- Mabel Johnson Leland
- Stanisław Lem
- Magdalena León de Leal
- Elmore Leonard
- Doris Lessing
- Jonathan Lethem
- Billie Letts
- Maurice Level
- Lilian Leveridge
- Denise Levertov
- Primo Levi
- Ira Levin
- C. S. Lewis
- Sinclair Lewis
- Wyndham Lewis
- A.J. Liebling
- Sigrid de Lima
- José Lezama Lima
- Fannie B. Linderman
- Astrid Lindgren
- Norman Lindsay
- Vachel Lindsay
- Elinor Lipman
- Walter Lippmann
- Clarice Lispector
- Penelope Lively
- Richard Llewellyn
- Morgan Llywelyn
- David Lodge
- Jack London
- Helen Dortch Longstreet
- Anita Loos
- Federico García Lorca
- Audre Lorde
- Bret Lott
- H. P. Lovecraft
- Earl Lovelace
- Robert Lowell
- Malcolm Lowry
- Mina Loy
- Dulce María Loynaz
- Lu Xun
- Robert Ludlum

== M ==
- Rose Macaulay
- Hugh MacDiarmid
- Ann-Marie MacDonald
- Elizabeth Roberts MacDonald
- Antonio Machado
- Alistair MacLean
- Archibald MacLeish
- Della Campbell MacLeod
- Maurice Maeterlinck
- Naguib Mahfouz
- Norman Mailer
- Mary Ann Maitland
- Bernard Malamud
- Michael Malone
- David Malouf
- André Malraux
- David Mamet
- Osip Mandelstam
- Heinrich Mann
- Thomas Mann
- María Emma Mannarelli
- Olivia Manning
- Katherine Mansfield
- Hilary Mantel
- William March
- Sándor Márai
- Gabriel García Márquez
- Filippo Tommaso Marinetti
- Paule Marshall
- George R. R. Martin
- Margaret Maruani
- John Masefield
- Bobbie Ann Mason
- Dan Masterson
- Richard Matheson
- Harry Mathews
- Sophie Dora Spicer Maude
- W. Somerset Maugham
- William Keepers Maxwell, Jr.
- Vladimir Mayakovsky
- James McBride
- Lida Rose McCabe
- Patrick McCabe
- Colum McCann
- Cormac McCarthy
- Mary McCarthy
- Carson McCullers
- David McCullough
- Ian McEwan
- John McGahern
- Jay McInerney
- Patricia McKillip
- Robin McKinley
- Katie McKy
- Alistair McLeod
- Marshall McLuhan
- Larry McMurtry
- Margaret Mead
- Mameve Medwed
- Pauline Melville
- H. L. Mencken
- Marguerite Merington
- James Merrill
- Magdalene Merritt
- Thomas Merton
- Lillian Rozell Messenger
- Grace Metalious
- Henri Michaux
- James A. Michener
- Edna St. Vincent Millay
- Arthur Miller
- Grażyna Miller
- Henry Miller
- Mrs. Alex. McVeigh Miller
- Walter M. Miller, Jr.
- A. A. Milne
- Frances Margaret Milne
- Czesław Miłosz
- Anchee Min
- Yukio Mishima
- Gabriela Mistral
- Rohinton Mistry
- Margaret Mitchell
- Nancy Mitford
- Ferenc Molnár
- N. Scott Momaday
- Natyaguru Nurul Momen
- Bob Monkhouse
- Frances Trego Montgomery
- Lucy Maud Montgomery
- Michael Moorcock
- Alan Moore
- Brian Moore
- Lorrie Moore
- Marianne Moore
- Henry Charles Frank Morant
- Alberto Moravia
- A. R. Morlan
- Toni Morrison
- Honoré Willsie Morrow
- Walter Mosley
- Lewis Mumford
- Clara Mulholland
- Heiner Müller
- Herta Müller
- Lewis Mumford
- Alice Munro
- Haruki Murakami
- Iris Murdoch
- Robert Musil

== N-O ==
- Vladimir Nabokov
- Ellen Torelle Nagler
- V. S. Naipaul
- Chūya Nakahara
- Atsushi Nakajima
- Ogden Nash
- Emma Huntington Nason
- Gloria Naylor
- Irène Némirovsky
- Pablo Neruda
- Edith Nesbit
- Aziz Nesin
- Katherine Neville
- Ngũgĩ wa Thiong'o
- Grace Nichols
- Lorine Niedecker
- Anaïs Nin
- Jeff Noon
- Charles Nordhoff
- Howard Norman
- Frank Norris
- Joyce Carol Oates
- Patrick O'Brian
- Flann O'Brien
- Tim O'Brien
- Seán O'Casey
- Flannery O'Connor
- Frank O'Connor
- Joseph O'Connor
- Clifford Odets
- John O'Hara
- Maude Andrews Ohl
- Ben Okri
- Robert Olmstead
- Charles Olson
- Katharine A. O'Keeffe O'Mahoney
- Stewart O'Nan
- Michael Ondaatje
- Eugene O'Neill
- Kenzaburō Ōe
- Juan Carlos Onetti
- Brian O'Nolan
- A. R. Orage
- P. J. O'Rourke
- José Ortega y Gasset
- Joe Orton
- George Orwell
- John Osborne
- P. D. Ouspensky
- Wilfred Owen
- Amos Oz
- Cynthia Ozick

== P-Q ==
- Elizabeth Fry Page
- Chuck Palahniuk
- Grace Paley
- Charles Palliser
- Orhan Pamuk
- Dorothy Parker
- Amy Parkinson
- Atena Pashko
- Boris Pasternak
- Alan Paton
- James Patterson
- Richard North Patterson
- David Payne
- Octavio Paz
- Mervyn Peake
- Iain Pears
- T. R. Pearson
- Harvey Pekar
- Sharon Kay Penman
- Walker Percy
- Georges Perec
- S. J. Perelman
- Pauline Periwinkle
- Charlotte Perkins Gilman
- Anne Perry
- Fernando Pessoa
- Julia Peterkin
- Anna Augusta Von Helmholtz-Phelan
- Jodi Picoult
- Marge Piercy
- Arturo Uslar Pietri
- Rosamund Pilcher
- Nicholas Pileggi
- Boris Pilnyak
- Robert Pinsky
- Harold Pinter
- Luigi Pirandello
- Sylvia Plath
- Andrei Platonov
- Francis Ponge
- Fanny Runnells Poole
- Delia Lyman Porter
- Katherine Anne Porter
- Robert Percival Porter
- Chaim Potok
- Beatrix Potter
- Dennis Potter
- Anna M. Longshore Potts
- Ezra Pound
- Anthony Powell
- Padgett Powell
- Tim Powers
- John Cowper Powys
- T. F. Powys
- Terry Pratchett
- Jacques Prévert
- J. B. Priestley
- Edna Dean Proctor
- Annie Proulx
- Marcel Proust
- Manuel Puig
- Philip Pullman
- Mario Puzo
- Barbara Pym
- Thomas Pynchon
- Ellery Queen
- Raymond Queneau
- Anna Quindlen

== R ==
- Emily Lee Sherwood Ragan
- Nazım Hikmet Ran
- Ayn Rand
- Dora Knowlton Ranous
- Raja Rao
- Terence Rattigan
- Marjorie Kinnan Rawlings
- James Redfield
- Beatrice Redpath
- Ishmael Reed
- John Reed
- Wilhelm Reich
- Emma May Alexander Reinertsen
- Erich Maria Remarque
- Mary Renault
- Ludwig Renn
- John Rewald
- Władysław Reymont
- Charles Reznikoff
- Jean Rhys
- Mrs. Riazuddin
- Anne Rice
- Grantland Rice
- Tim Rice
- Adrienne Rich
- Dorothy Richardson
- Hester Dorsey Richardson
- John Richardson
- Mordecai Richler
- E. J. Richmond
- Rainer Maria Rilke
- Yannis Ritsos
- Augusto Roa Bastos
- Alain Robbe-Grillet
- Harold Robbins
- Tom Robbins
- Nora Roberts
- Frances Forbes-Robertson
- Edwin Arlington Robinson
- Mercè Rodoreda
- Theodore Roethke
- Emma Winner Rogers
- Romain Rolland
- Martha Parmelee Rose
- Isaac Rosenberg
- Henry Roth
- Joseph Roth
- Philip Roth
- J. K. Rowling
- Mike Royko
- Robert Ruark
- Ella Giles Ruddy
- Juan Rulfo
- Kathy Rudy
- Damon Runyon
- Norman Rush
- Salman Rushdie
- Bertrand Russell
- Mary Doria Russell
- Richard Russo

== S ==
- Antoine de Saint-Exupéry
- Ernesto Sabato
- Nelly Sachs
- Anna T. Sadlier
- Carl Sagan
- Saki
- Tayeb Salih
- J. D. Salinger
- Mark Salzman
- Sonia Sanchez
- Carl Sandburg
- Aksel Sandemose
- José Saramago
- Nathalie Sarraute
- William Saroyan
- Jean-Paul Sartre
- Siegfried Sassoon
- Henriette Sauret
- Dorothy L. Sayers
- Jack Schaefer
- Meyer Schapiro
- Bernhard Schlink
- James Schuyler
- André Schwarz-Bart
- Paul Scott
- Gil Scott-Heron
- W. G. Sebald
- Alice Sebold
- David Sedaris
- George Seferis
- Anna Seghers
- Gertrude Woodcock Seibert
- Jaroslav Seifert
- Hubert Selby
- Emily McGary Selinger
- Samuel Selvon
- Maurice Sendak
- Olive Senior
- Iryna Senyk
- Vikram Seth
- Anya Seton
- Mary Lee Settle
- Anne Sexton
- Michael Shaara
- Ntozake Shange
- Karl Shapiro
- Emma Augusta Sharkey
- Harriette R. Shattuck
- George Bernard Shaw
- Irwin Shaw
- Lurana W. Sheldon
- Sidney Sheldon
- Sam Shepard
- M. P. Shiel
- Carol Shields
- William L. Shirer
- Dora Adele Shoemaker
- Anita Shreve
- Nevil Shute
- Leslie Marmon Silko
- Alan Sillitoe
- Georges Simenon
- Dan Simmons
- Claude Simon
- Neil Simon
- Clive Sinclair
- Upton Sinclair
- Isaac Bashevis Singer
- Jane Smiley
- Luella Dowd Smith
- Wilbur Smith
- Louise Hammond Willis Snead
- C. P. Snow
- Gary Snyder
- Sasha Sokolov
- Aleksandr Solzhenitsyn
- Susan Sontag
- Charles Sorley
- Terry Southern
- Wole Soyinka
- Muriel Spark
- Stephen Spender
- Mickey Spillane
- Benjamin Spock
- Cynthia Morgan St. John
- Olaf Stapledon
- Helen Ekin Starrett
- Danielle Steel
- Lincoln Steffens
- Christina Stead
- Wallace Stegner
- Evaleen Stein
- Gertrude Stein
- John Steinbeck
- Neal Stephenson
- Wallace Stevens
- Jane Agnes Stewart
- Mary Stewart
- Robert Lawrence Stine (R. L. Stine)
- S. M. Stirling
- I. F. Stone
- Irving Stone
- Robert Stone
- Tom Stoppard
- Jack Trevor Story
- Rex Stout
- Lytton Strachey
- Susan Straight
- Peter Straub
- Thomas Sigismund Stribling
- Flora E. Strout
- Theodore Sturgeon
- William Styron
- Patrick Süskind
- Efua Sutherland
- Italo Svevo
- Graham Swift
- John Millington Synge
- Wisława Szymborska

== T ==
- Rabindranath Tagore
- Gay Talese
- Amy Tan
- Ida M. Tarbell
- Booth Tarkington
- Donna Tartt
- Elizabeth Taylor
- Sara Teasdale
- Studs Terkel
- Josephine Tey
- Elswyth Thane
- Françoise Thébaud
- Dylan Thomas
- R. S. Thomas
- E. S. L. Thompson
- Hunter S. Thompson
- Jim Thompson
- Rose Hartwick Thorpe
- James Thurber
- Miriam Toews
- Alvin Toffler
- Colm Toibin
- John Toland
- J. R. R. Tolkien
- Ernst Toller
- Zaim Topčić
- Zlatko Topčić
- John Kennedy Toole
- Jean Toomer
- Florence Trail
- Georg Trakl
- Clara Augusta Jones Trask
- B. Traven
- Rose Tremain
- Trevanian
- William Trevor
- Lionel Trilling
- Amélie Rives Troubetzkoy
- Dalton Trumbo
- Marina Tsvetaeva
- Barbara W. Tuchman
- Alice Bellvadore Sams Turner
- Harry Turtledove
- Emma Rood Tuttle
- Sarah Lowe Twiggs
- Anne Tyler
- Tristan Tzara

== U-W ==
- Lyudmila Ulitskaya
- Giuseppe Ungaretti
- Barry Unsworth
- John Updike
- Leon Uris
- Jane Urquhart
- Paul Valéry
- César Vallejo
- Ramón del Valle-Inclán
- Andrew Vachss
- Gertrude Vaile
- Mario Vargas Llosa
- Jean Venturini
- Boris Vian
- Gore Vidal
- Kurt Vonnegut
- Susan Vreeland
- John Wain
- Derek Walcott
- Alice Walker
- Rosa Kershaw Walker
- David Foster Wallace
- Irving Wallace
- Robert Walser
- Minnie Gow Walsworth
- Joseph Wambaugh
- Robert Penn Warren
- Sarah Waters
- Evelyn Waugh
- Max Weber
- Frank Wedekind
- H. G. Wells
- Eudora Welty
- Cornel West
- Dorothy West
- Morris West
- Nathanael West
- Edith Wharton
- Mary Sparkes Wheeler
- Lily C. Whitaker
- E. B. White
- Laura Rosamond White
- Patrick White
- T. H. White
- Theodore H. White
- Colson Whitehead
- Lilian Whiting
- Mary Traffarn Whitney
- John Edgar Wideman
- Elie Wiesel
- Kate Douglas Wiggin
- Emma Howard Wight
- Richard Wilbur
- Louise Collier Willcox
- Laura Ingalls Wilder
- Thornton Wilder
- John Williams
- Tad Williams
- Tennessee Williams
- William Carlos Williams
- Connie Willis
- Anne Elizabeth Wilson
- August Wilson
- Bertha M. Wilson
- Colin Wilson
- Edmund Wilson
- Ibbie McColm Wilson
- Margaret Wilson
- Helen M. Winslow
- Jeanette Winterson
- Tim Winton
- Owen Wister
- Stanisław Ignacy Witkiewicz
- Monique Wittig
- P. G. Wodehouse
- Christa Wolf
- Gene Wolfe
- Thomas Wolfe
- Tom Wolfe
- Tobias Wolff
- Bob Woodward
- Virginia Woolf
- Herman Wouk
- Alexander Woollcott
- Abba Goold Woolson
- P. C. Wren
- Richard Wright
- Wilmer Cave Wright
- Sylvia Wynter

== X-Z ==
- Malcolm X
- Lu Xun
- Tetiana Yakovenko
- Richard Yates
- W. B. Yeats
- Julia Ditto Young
- Marguerite Yourcenar
- Carlos Ruiz Zafon
- Helen Zahavi
- Yevgeny Zamyatin
- Roger Zelazny
- Louis Zukofsky
- Stefan Zweig

== See also ==
- List of writers of the Lost Generation
- Lists of writers
- 20th century in literature
- 20th century in poetry
- 21st century in literature
- List of years in literature
- List of avant-garde artists
- Modern Library 100 Best Novels
- List of playwrights
- List of crime writers
- List of authors of erotic works
- List of horror fiction writers
- List of science fiction authors
- List of fantasy authors
- Non-fiction
- Fiction
- List of writers from peoples indigenous to the Americas
