= 1857 =

1857 in various calendars
- Gregorian calendar: 1857; MDCCCLVII
- Ab urbe condita: 2610
- Armenian calendar: 1306; ԹՎ ՌՅԶ
- Assyrian calendar: 6607
- Baháʼí calendar: 13–14
- Balinese saka calendar: 1778–1779
- Bengali calendar: 1263–1264
- Berber calendar: 2807
- British Regnal year: 20 Vict. 1 – 21 Vict. 1
- Buddhist calendar: 2401
- Burmese calendar: 1219
- Byzantine calendar: 7365–7366
- Chinese calendar: 丙辰年 (Fire Dragon); 4554 or 4347 — to — 丁巳年 (Fire Snake); 4555 or 4348
- Coptic calendar: 1573–1574
- Discordian calendar: 3023
- Ethiopian calendar: 1849–1850
- Hebrew calendar: 5617–5618
- Hindu calendars
- Vikram Samvat: 1913–1914
- Shaka Samvat: 1778–1779
- Kali Yuga: 4957–4958
- Holocene calendar: 11857
- Igbo calendar: 857–858
- Iranian calendar: 1235–1236
- Islamic calendar: 1273–1274
- Japanese calendar: Ansei 4 (安政４年)
- Javanese calendar: 1785–1786
- Julian calendar: Gregorian minus 12 days
- Korean calendar: 4190
- Minguo calendar: 55 before ROC 民前55年
- Nanakshahi calendar: 389
- Thai solar calendar: 2399–2400
- Tibetan calendar: མེ་ཕོ་འབྲུག་ལོ་ (male Fire-Dragon); 1983 or 1602 or 830 — to — མེ་མོ་སྦྲུལ་ལོ་ (female Fire-Snake); 1984 or 1603 or 831

May 10: The Sepoy Mutiny breaks out in British India.

1857 (MDCCCLVII) was a common year starting on Thursday of the Gregorian calendar and a common year starting on Tuesday of the Julian calendar, the 1857th year of the Common Era (CE) and Anno Domini (AD) designations, the 857th year of the 2nd millennium, the 57th year of the 19th century, and the 8th year of the 1850s decade. As of the start of 1857, the Gregorian calendar was 12 days ahead of the Julian calendar, which remained in localized use until 1923.

== Events ==
=== January–March ===
- January 1 – The biggest Estonian newspaper, Postimees, is established by Johann Voldemar Jannsen.
- January 7 – The partly French-owned London General Omnibus Company begins operating.
- January 9 – The 7.9 M_{w} Fort Tejon earthquake shakes Central and Southern California, with a maximum Mercalli intensity of IX (Violent).
- January 24 – The University of Calcutta is established in Calcutta, as the first multidisciplinary modern university in South Asia. The University of Bombay is also established in Bombay, British India, this year.
- February 3 – The National Deaf Mute College (later renamed Gallaudet University) is established in Washington, D.C., becoming the first school for the advanced education of the deaf.
- February 5 – The Federal Constitution of the United Mexican States is promulgated.
- March – The Austrian garrison leaves Bucharest.
- March 3
  - France and the United Kingdom formally declare war on China, in the Second Anglo-Chinese War.
  - The largest slave auction in U.S. history is held, dubbed The Weeping Time. Over a 2-day period (starting March 2), Pierce M. Butler sells 436 men, women, children, and infants, all of whom are kept in stalls meant for horses at a racetrack in Savannah, Georgia, for weeks beforehand.
- March 6 – Dred Scott v. Sandford: The Supreme Court of the United States rules that blacks are not citizens and slaves can not sue for freedom, driving the U.S. further towards the American Civil War (the ruling is not overturned until the 14th Amendment is adopted in 1868).
- March 8 – 12 – Spirit Lake Massacre, near Okoboji and Spirit lakes in the northwestern territory of Iowa near the Minnesota border.
- March 12 – Elizabeth Blackwell opens a hospital, the New York Infirmary for Indigent Women and Children.
- March 14 – Youssef Bey Karam is assigned, by the people of Ehden and Bsharri, to be the region's ruler.
- March 23 – Elisha Otis' first elevator is installed (at 488 Broadway, New York City).
- March 25 – The phonautograph is patented by French typesetter Édouard-Léon Scott de Martinville. It is the earliest known device for recording sound.

=== April–June ===
- April 4 – The Anglo-Persian War ends.
- April 8 – Mangal Pandey is hanged for mutiny against the British East India Company army; the execution is a precursor event to the Indian Rebellion of 1857.
- April 14 – Princess Beatrice, the fifth daughter and the youngest child of Queen Victoria and Prince Albert, is born.
- April 18 – The Spirits' Book (Le Livre des Esprits), one of the Five Fundamental Works of Spiritism, is published by French educator Allan Kardec.
- April 27 – First horse race run at Longchamp Racecourse in Paris.
- May 5 – October 17 – The Art Treasures of Great Britain exhibition is held in Manchester, one of the largest such displays of all time.
- May 10 – Indian Rebellion of 1857: The 3rd Light Cavalry of the British East India Company's army rebels against its British officers, thus beginning the rebellion.
- May 11 – Indian Rebellion of 1857: Indian combatants capture Delhi from the British East India Company.
- May 15 – Spanish financial group, Banco Santander founded in Cantabria, Spain.
- May 28 – Banco de Bilbao, as predecessor of BBVA is founded in Spain.
- June 1 – Second Anglo-Chinese War: Battle of Fatshan Creek – The British Royal Navy defeats the Cantonese fleet of Qing dynasty China.
- June 6 – Sophia of Nassau marries the future King Oscar II of Sweden–Norway.
- June 12 – U.S. mercenary William Walker is overthrown as ruler of Nicaragua by Honduran general Florencio Xatruch.
- June 20 – The Victoria and Albert Museum in London is officially opened by Queen Victoria.
- June 26 – At a ceremony in London, Queen Victoria awards the first 66 Victoria Crosses to British troops, for actions during the Crimean War.

=== July–September ===
- July 1–November 19 – Indian Rebellion of 1857: Siege of Lucknow.
- July 15 – Indian Rebellion of 1857: The second massacre at Kanpur takes place.
- July 18
  - The Utah Expedition leaves Fort Leavenworth, effectively beginning the Utah War.
  - Prison hulks are used for the last time in the United Kingdom.
- August 20 – The Dunbar wrecks near the entrance to Sydney Harbour, Australia, with the loss of 121 lives.
- August 28 – The Matrimonial Causes Act makes divorce without parliamentary approval legal in the United Kingdom.
- September – The Panic of 1857 begins: Speculation in U.S. railroad shares, and the collapse on August 24 of the New York City branch of the Ohio Life Insurance and Trust Company, following widespread embezzlement, trigger a financial crisis which will extend to Europe.
- September 11 – The Mountain Meadows massacre occurs in Utah.
- September 12 – The SS Central America sinks off the coast of North Carolina with the loss of 425 lives.
- September 20 – Indian Rebellion of 1857: British forces recapture Delhi, compelling the surrender of Bahadur Shah II, the last Mughal emperor.
- September 22 (September 10 O.S.) – Russian ship of the line Lefort sinks in the Gulf of Finland during a sudden squall with the loss of 826 lives; 30 other ships are wrecked in the same storm.

=== October–December ===
- October 13 – Panic of 1857: New York banks close, and do not reopen until December 12.
- October 24
  - Sheffield F.C., the world's first association football team, is founded in Sheffield, United Kingdom by Nathaniel Creswick and William Prest
  - 28 enslaved people escape their enslavers in Maryland.
- November 1 – The Indus Valley Region (i.e., Pakistan Region) is incorporated as part of British India, for the next 90 years until 1947.
- November 16 – Indian Rebellion of 1857: British troops win 24 Victoria Crosses in action this day.
- November 30 – President of Mexico Ignacio Comonfort is succeeded by Félix María Zuloaga.
- December – The Reform War in Mexico begins.
- December 7 – U.S. Consul in Japan Townsend Harris meets the Shogun in Edo in a diplomatic reception, the first ever meeting between the Shogun and a foreign diplomat.
- December 16 – The 7.0 M_{w} Basilicata earthquake shakes the Kingdom of the Two Sicilies (Southern Italy) with a maximum Mercalli intensity of XI (Extreme), killing about 10,000 people.
- December 20 – Emperor Franz Joseph I of Austria issues a decree, Es ist Mein Wille, which leads to the demolition of the city walls of Vienna, allowing the construction of the Ringstraße.
- December 28 – Second Anglo-Chinese War: 2nd Battle of Canton – British and French forces begin an assault on the Qing dynasty Chinese city of Canton (Guangzhou).
- December 31 – Queen Victoria chooses Ottawa as the capital of Canada.

=== Date unknown ===
- Liberia annexes the Republic of Maryland as native groups (notably Grebo people and Kru people) continually attack and kill settlers in Cape Palmas.
- Bustling tourist attraction Sunny Lane in Falmouth, United Kingdom, is built.
- The first commercial tea plantation in the British Raj is opened in the Mulnicherra Estate in Sylhet.
- The Mormons abandon Las Vegas.
- Kuala Lumpur, the future capital of Malaysia, is founded as a tin mining settlement.
- La Tène culture artifacts are discovered in Switzerland, by Hansli Kopp.
- Illinois State University, the first public university in Illinois, is established in Normal, Illinois.
- San Jose State, the first public U.S. university west of the Mississippi River, opens in San Francisco as Minn's Evening School.
- Bucharest becomes the world's first city to have its streets illuminated by kerosene lamps.
- U.S. politician William Daniel proposes the Local Option for Prohibition.
- U.S. composer James Lord Pierpont composes "Jingle Bells", originally entitled "The One Horse Open Sleigh".
- Suzumoto Vaudeville Theater officially opens in Ueno region, Edo (modern-day Tokyo) in Japan.

== Births ==
=== January–March ===
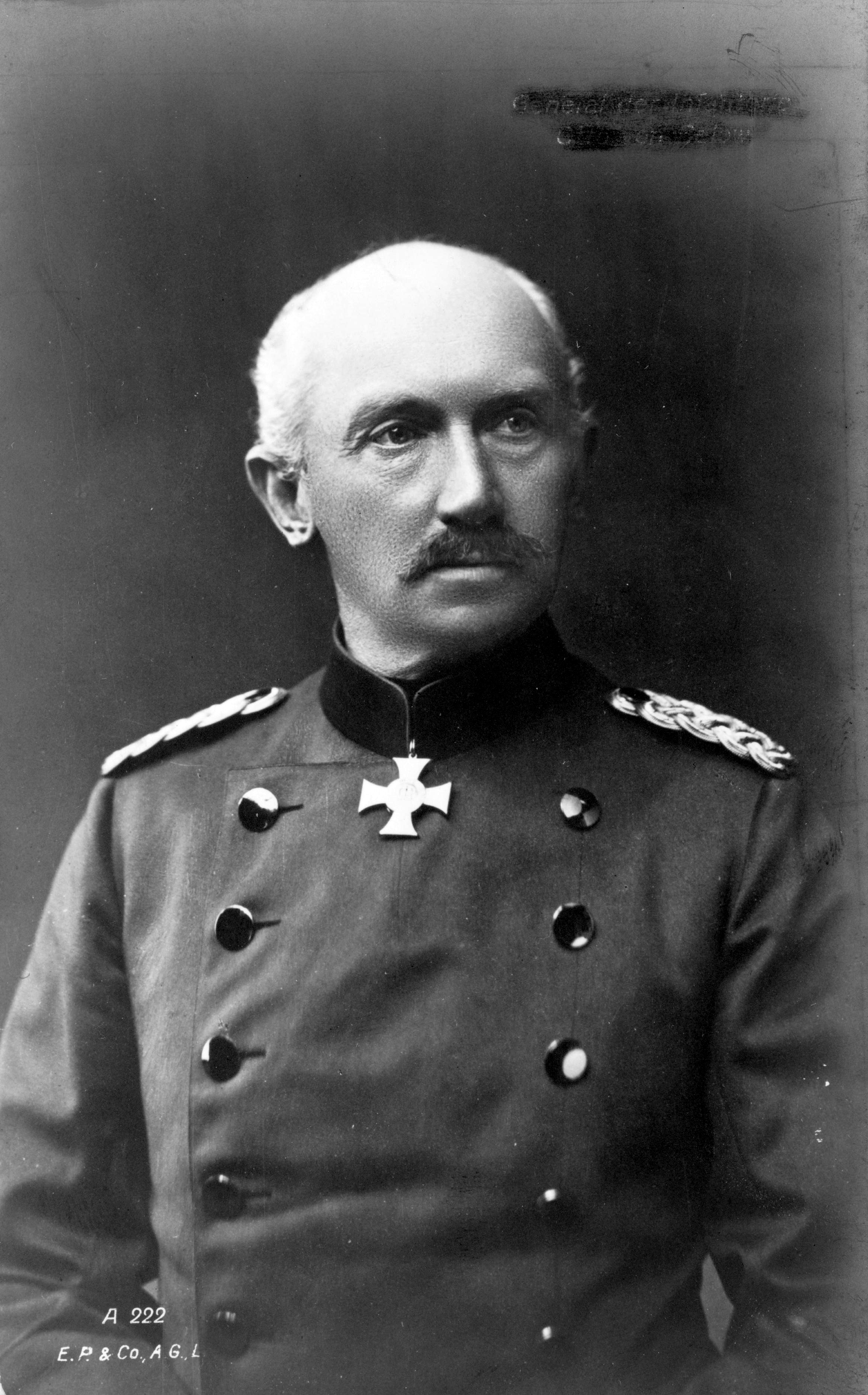
Otto von Below

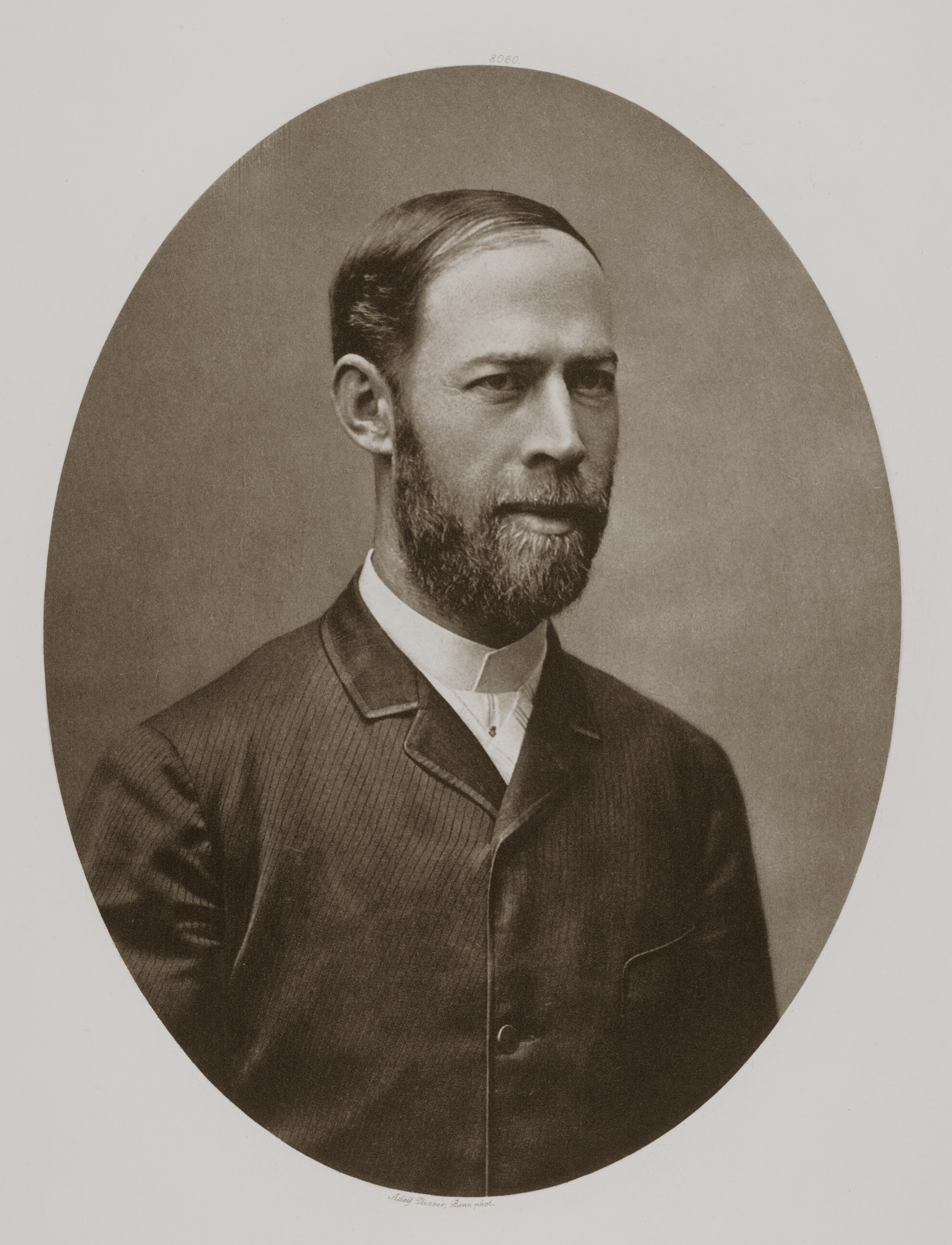
Heinrich Hertz

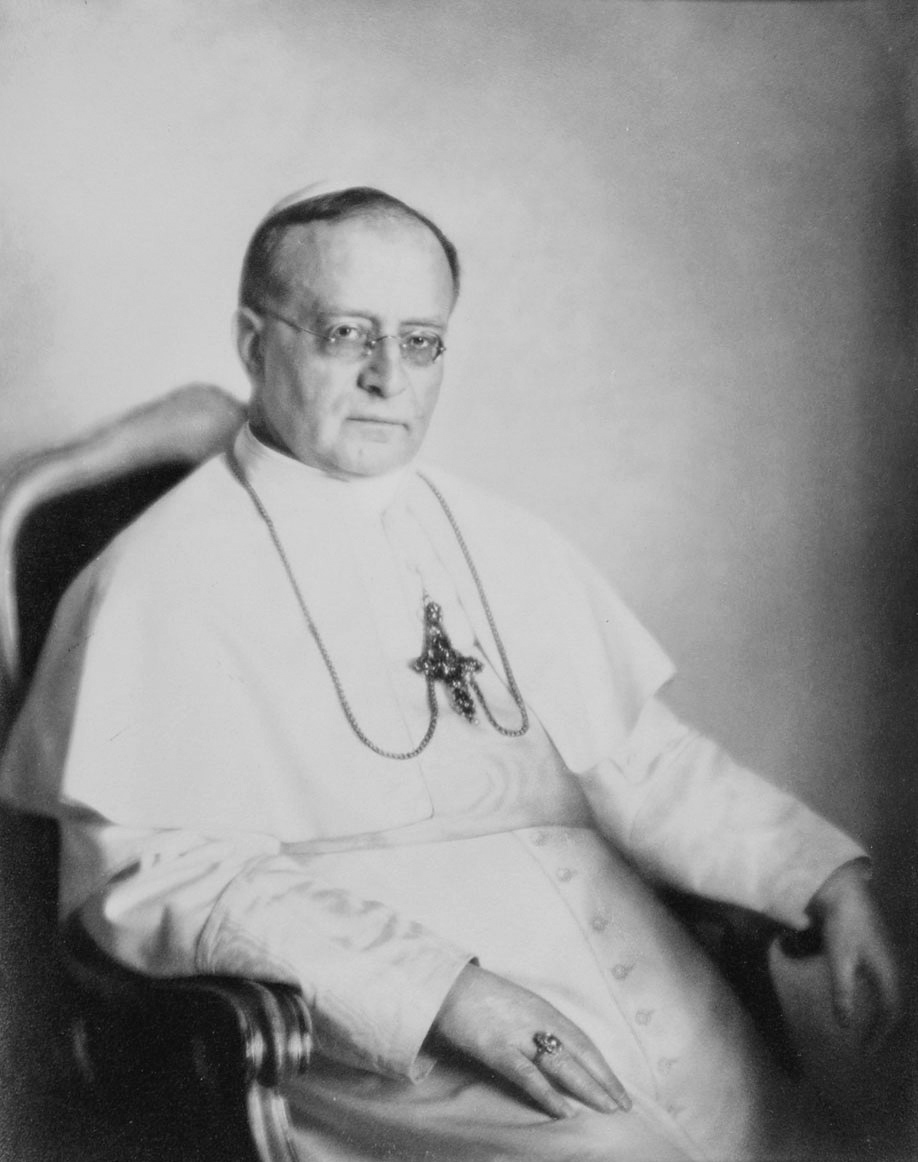
Pope Pius XI

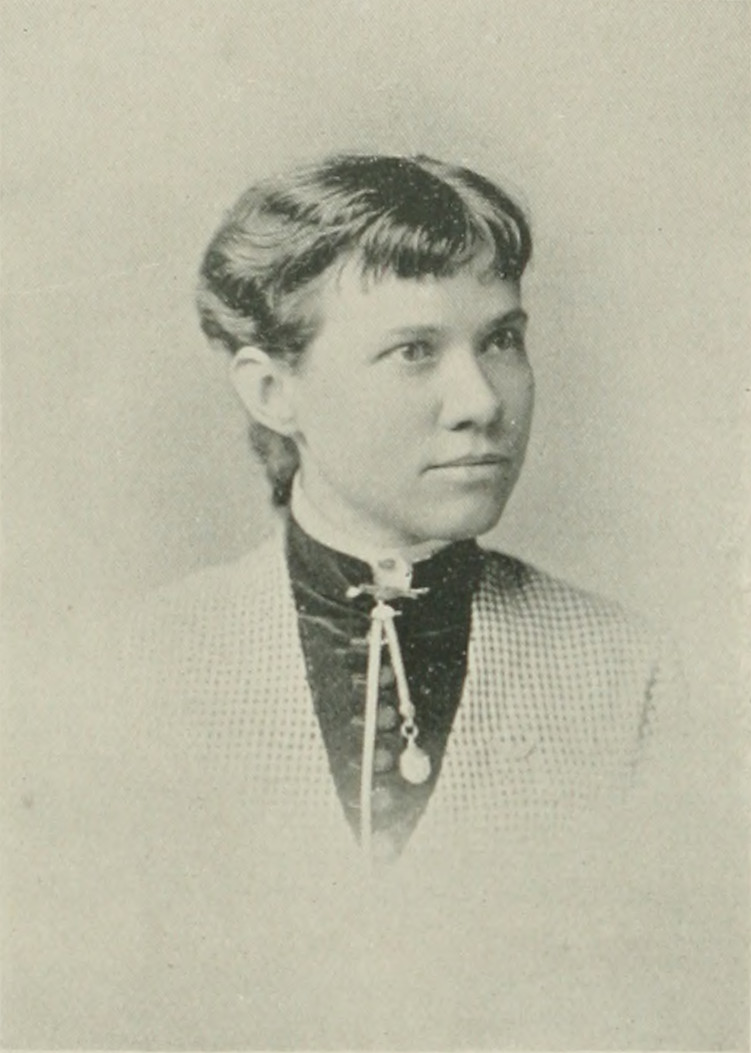
Annie Maria Barnes

- January 2 – Uryū Sotokichi, Japanese admiral (d. 1937)
- January 4 – Émile Courtet, French caricaturist, animator (d. 1938)
- January 12
  - Knut Ångström, Swedish physicist (d. 1910)
  - Léon de Witte de Haelen, Belgian general (d. 1933)
- January 13 – Anastasios Papoulas, Greek general (d. 1935)
- January 18 – Otto von Below, German general (d. 1944)
- January 26 – The 12th Dalai Lama of Tibet (d. 1875)
- January 31 – George Jackson Churchward, British chief mechanical engineer of the Great Western Railway(d. 1933)
- February 1 – Lucy Wheelock, American early childhood education pioneer within the kindergarten movement (d. 1946)
- February 13 – Almanzo James Wilder, American writer (d. 1949)
- February 18 – Dmitry Shcherbachev, Russian general (d. 1932)
- February 22
  - Robert Baden-Powell, English founder of the Scouting movement (d. 1941)
  - Heinrich Hertz, German physicist (d. 1894)
- March 4
  - Constantin Coandă, Romanian general and politician, 26th Prime Minister of Romania (d. 1932)
  - Aleksei Evert, Russian general (d. 1918 or 1926)
- March 6 – George Dayton, American businessman, founder of Target Corporation (d. 1938)
- March 7
  - Genevieve Stebbins, American performer of the Delsarte system of expression (d. 1934)
  - Julius Wagner-Jauregg, Austrian neuroscientist, recipient of the Nobel Prize in Physiology or Medicine (d. 1940)
- March 13 – Herbert Plumer, 1st Viscount Plumer, British general (d. 1932)
- March 15 – Christian Michelsen, 1st Prime Minister of Norway (d. 1925)
- March 18 – Harriet Converse Moody, American businesswoman and arts patron (d. 1932)
- March 21 – Hunter Liggett, American general (d. 1935)
- March 22 – Paul Doumer, President of France (d. 1932)
- March 26 – Théodore Tuffier, French surgeon (d. 1929)
- March 27
  - Ella Hepworth Dixon, English author and editor (d. 1932)
  - Karl Pearson, English statistician (d. 1936)
- March 30 – Léon Charles Thévenin, French telegraph engineer (d. 1926)

=== April–June ===
- April 5 – Alexander of Battenberg, first Prince of Bulgaria (d. 1893)
- April 14
  - Princess Beatrice of the United Kingdom, youngest child of Queen Victoria (d. 1944)
  - Victor Horsley, English physician, surgeon (d. 1916)
- April 22 – Paul Dresser, American songwriter (d. 1906)
- April 23 – Ruggero Leoncavallo, Italian composer (d. 1919)
- April 30 – Walter Simon, German philanthropist (d. 1920)
- May 1 – Theo van Gogh, Dutch art dealer (d. 1891)
- May 7 – William A. MacCorkle, Governor of West Virginia (d. 1930)
- May 10 – Viktor Graf von Scheuchenstuel, Austro-Hungarian general (d. 1938)
- May 13 – Ronald Ross, English physician, recipient of the Nobel Prize in Physiology or Medicine (d. 1932)
- May 15 – Williamina Fleming, Scottish astronomer (d. 1911)
- May 19 – John Jacob Abel, American pharmacologist (d. 1938)
- May 24 – Richard Mansfield, Anglo-American stage actor (d. 1907)
- May 27 – Theodor Curtius, German chemist (d. 1928)
- May 28
  - Annie Maria Barnes, American author of children's literature (unknown year of death)
  - Robert C. Hilliard, American stage actor (d. 1927)
- June 2
  - Urban Jacob Rasmus Børresen, Norwegian admiral and industry leader (d. 1943)
  - Edward Elgar, English composer (d. 1934)
  - Karl Adolph Gjellerup, Danish writer, Nobel Prize laureate (d. 1919)
- June 8 – Lawrence Marston, American actor, playwright and film director (d. 1939)
- June 10 – Caroline Louise Dudley (later Mrs. Leslie Carter), American stage actress (d. 1937)
- June 12 – Kate Lester, English stage & silent screen actress (d. 1924)
- June 16 – Arthur Arz von Straußenburg, Austro-Hungarian general (d. 1935)
- June 20 – Mary Gage Day, American physician (d. 1935)
- June 30 – Friedrich von Ingenohl, German admiral (d. 1933)

=== July–September ===
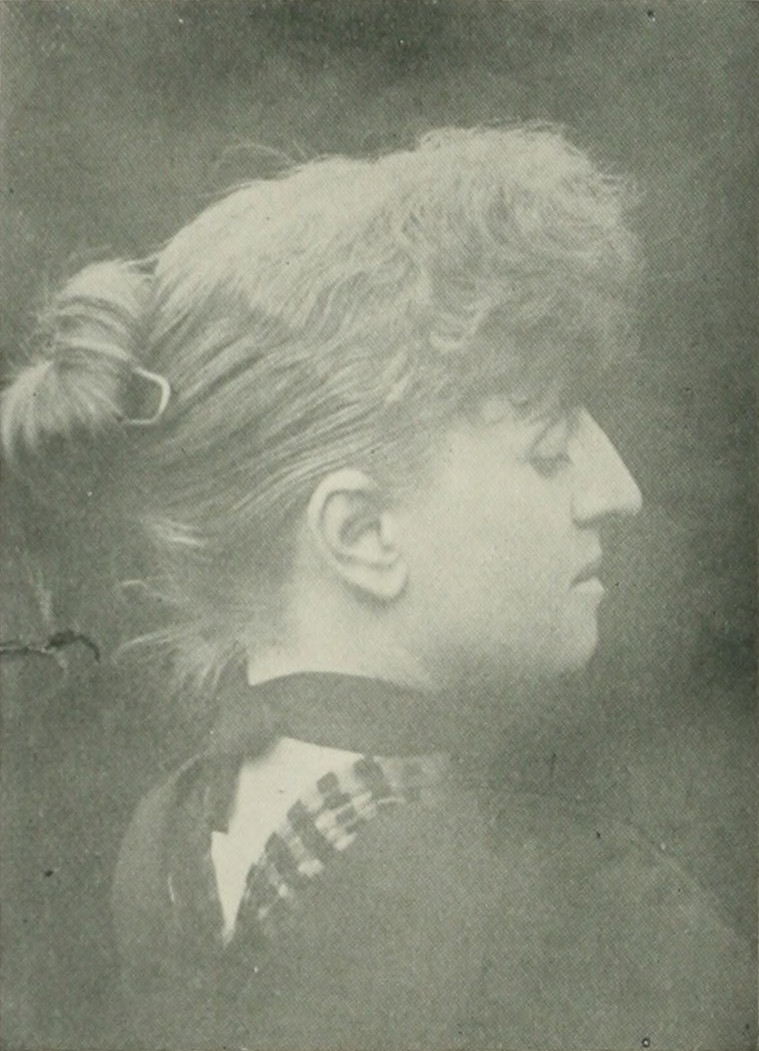
Dorothea Rhodes Lummis Moore

- July 1 – Martha Hughes Cannon, American politician (d. 1932)
- July 5 – Clara Zetkin, German-born Marxist theorist, activist and women's rights advocate (d. 1933)
- July 11 – Alfred Binet, French psychologist (Stanford–Binet Intelligence Scales) (d. 1911)
- July 14 – Vittorio Ranuzzi de' Bianchi, Italian Roman Catholic cardinal (d. 1927)
- July 22 – Shams-ul-haq Azeemabadi, Indian Islamic scholar (d. 1911)
- July 23 – Carl Meinhof, German linguist (d. 1944)
- July 24
  - Henrik Pontoppidan, Danish writer, Nobel Prize laureate (d. 1943)
  - Juan Vicente Gómez, President of Venezuela (d. 1935)
- July 25 – Nat Goodwin, American actor (d. 1919)
- July 28 – Ballington Booth, British-born American Salvation Army officer, co-founder of Volunteers of America (d. 1940)
- July 30
  - Lucy Bacon, California Impressionist painter (d. 1932)
  - Thorstein Veblen, American economist (d. 1929)
- August 8 – Henry Fairfield Osborn, American geologist, paleontologist and eugenist (d. 1935)
- August 14 – Max Wagenknecht, German composer (d. 1922)
- August 15 – Albert Ballin, German shipping magnate, owner of the Hamburg America Line (d. 1918)
- August 16 – Ioan Popovici, Romanian general (d. 1956)
- August 18 – Sergei Sheydeman, Russian general (d. 1922)
- August 27 – Oskar von Hutier, German general (d. 1934)
- September 5 – Konstantin Tsiolkovsky, Russian scientist, inventor (d. 1935)
- September 8 – Georg Michaelis, 6th Chancellor of Germany (d. 1936)
- September 13 – Milton S. Hershey, American chocolate manufacturer (d. 1945)
- September 15 – William Howard Taft, 27th President of the United States and 10th Chief Justice of the United States (d. 1930)
- September 18 – John Hessin Clarke, Associate Justice of the Supreme Court of the United States (d. 1945)
- September 20 – Antoine de Mitry, French general (d. 1924)
- September 28 – Lewis Bayly, British admiral (d. 1938)

=== October–December ===
- October 1 – John Mackenzie Moore, Canadian architect (died 1930)
- October 2
  - Martinus Theunis Steyn, Boer lawyer, politician and statesman, sixth and last President of the Orange Free State (1896–1902) (d. 1916)
  - A. E. Waite, British occultist (d. 1942)
- October 5 – Peadar Toner Mac Fhionnlaoich, Irish language writer (d. 1942)
- October 14 – Joseph Rucker Lamar, Associate Justice of the Supreme Court of the United States (d. 1916)
- October 24 – Ned Williamson, American baseball player (d. 1894)
- October 27 – Ernst Trygger, 19th Prime Minister of Sweden (d. 1943)
- November 5
  - Joseph Tabrar, British songwriter (d. 1931)
  - Ida Tarbell, American journalist (d. 1944)
- November 9 – Dorothea Rhodes Lummis Moore, American physician (d. 1942)
- November 14 – Mihail Savov, Bulgarian general (d. 1928)
- November 15 – Mikhail Alekseyev, Russian general (d. 1918)
- November 17 – George Marchant, English-born inventor, manufacturer and philanthropist (d. 1941)
- November 26 – Ferdinand de Saussure, Swiss linguist (d. 1913)
- November 27 – Charles Scott Sherrington, English physiologist, Nobel Prize laureate (d. 1952)
- November 28 – King Alfonso XII of Spain (d. 1885)
- November 29 – Theodor Escherich, German pediatrician (d. 1911)
- December 3 – Joseph Conrad, Polish-British novelist (d. 1924)
- December 4 – Julia Evelyn Ditto Young, American poet and novelist (d. 1915)

=== Date unknown ===
- Marguerite Merington, English-born American author (d. 1951)

== Deaths ==
=== January–June ===
- January 27 – Dorothea Lieven, Baltic-German diplomat in Russian services (b. 1785)
- February 10 – David Thompson, British-Canadian explorer (b. 1770)
- February 15 – Mikhail Glinka, Russian composer (b. 1804)
- February 16 – Elisha Kent Kane, American explorer of the Arctic regions (b. 1820)
- March 9 – Dominic Savio, Italian adolescent saint (b. 1842)
- March 11 – Manuel José Quintana, Spanish poet (b. 1772)
- March 19 – William Henry Playfair, Scottish architect (b. 1790)
- April 8 – Mangal Pandey, Indian soldier (executed; b. 1827)
- May 2 – Alfred de Musset, French poet (b. 1810)
- May 11 – Eugène François Vidocq, French criminal, private detective (b. 1775)
- May 13 – Parley P. Pratt, early American Latter Day Saint movement leader (murdered) (b. 1807)
- May 16 – Vasily Tropinin, Russian Romantic painter (b. 1776)
- May 23 – Augustin-Louis Cauchy, French mathematician (b. 1789)
- May 29
  - Agustina de Aragón, Spanish heroine (b. 1786)Henry Gardiner Adams, ed. (1857). "Agostina, The Maid of Saragossa" . A Cyclopaedia of Female Biography: 16–18. Wikidata Q115393061 – via Wikisource.
  - Archduchess Sophie of Austria, first child of Emperor Franz Joseph I and Empress Elisabeth of Austria (b. 1855)
- June 10 – John Walbach, French baron and officer in the United States Army, with a military career spanning over 57 years (b. 1766)
- June 30 – Alcide d'Orbigny, French naturalist (b. 1802)

=== July–December ===
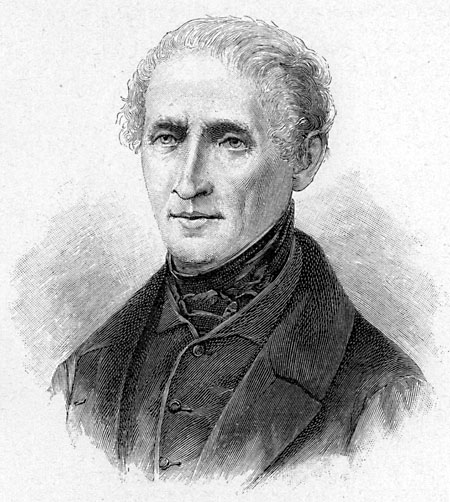
Joseph Eichendorff

- July 4 – Henry Lawrence, British soldier, statesman (b. 1806)
- July 15 – Carl Czerny, Austrian composer (b. 1791)
- July 19 – Stefano Franscini, member of the Swiss Federal Council (b. 1796)
- July 29 – Charles Lucien Bonaparte, French naturalist, ornithologist (b. 1803)
- August 3 – Eugène Sue, French novelist (b. 1804)
- September 3 – John McLoughlin, Canadian trapper (b. 1784)
- September 5 – Auguste Comte, French philosopher (b. 1798)
- November 12
  - Manuel Oribe, 2nd President of Uruguay (b. 1792)
  - Maximilian Spinola, Italian entomologist (b. 1780)
- November 26 – Joseph von Eichendorff, German poet (b. 1788)
- December 3 – Christian Daniel Rauch, German sculptor (b. 1777)
- December 15 – Sir George Cayley, English aviation pioneer (b. 1773)
- December 27 – Lucien Baudens, French military surgeon (b. 1804)

=== Date unknown ===
- Eduard von Feuchtersleben, Austrian mining engineer and writer (b. 1798)
- Elizabeth Philpot, British paleontologist (b. 1780)
