= David Payne =

David Payne may refer to:

- David L. Payne (1836–1884), American soldier and pioneer, "Father of Oklahoma"
- David Payne (artist) (1843–1894), Scottish landscape painter
- David Payne (chaplain) (1931–2014), Anglican priest
- David Payne (politician) (born 1944), Canadian politician
- Davey Payne (born 1944), English saxophonist
- David N. Payne (born 1944), professor of photonics at the University of Southampton
- David Payne (footballer) (born 1947), English footballer
- Davy Payne (c. 1949–2003), Northern Irish paramilitary
- David Payne (novelist) (born 1955), American novelist
- David Payne (meteorologist) (born 1968), American television meteorologist
- David Payne (hurdler) (born 1982), American 110 m hurdles runner
- David Payne (cricketer) (born 1991), Gloucestershire and England cricketer
