= Cleo Damianakes =

American etcher and illustrator (1895–1979)

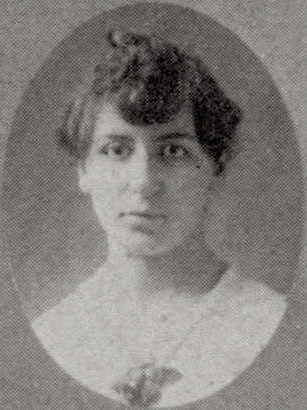
- Damianakes in 1917
- Born: Cleo Theodora Damianakes; March 1, 1895; Berkeley, California, US
- Died: August 27, 1979 (aged 84); Alameda, California, US
- Other names: Cleon, Cleonike, Cleo Wilkins
- Education: The California School of Fine Arts; University of California, Berkeley; Art Students League of New York
- Occupations: Illustrator and etcher
- Known for: Book dust jackets
- Spouse: Ralph Brooks Wilkins (m. 1924)

Cleo Theodora Damianakes (March 1, 1895 – August 27, 1979), nom de plume Cleon or Cleonike, was an American etcher, painter, and illustrator. She was widely known for designing dust jackets for Lost Generation writers in the 1920s and early 1930s, including cover art for the first editions of Ernest Hemingway's The Sun Also Rises and A Farewell to Arms, as well as F. Scott Fitzgerald's All the Sad Young Men, which were published by Charles Scribner's Sons. Other authors she designed covers for included novelists such as Zelda Fitzgerald, Conrad Aiken, John Galsworthy, and Arthur B. Reeve.

A Greek American, Damianakes was critically acclaimed for the classical Greek influence in her etchings, and was a member of the Chicago Society of Etchers, which awarded her a medal in 1922. Her work is now part of the permanent collections of the National Gallery of Art, the Art Institute of Chicago, the Smithsonian American Art Museum, and others. Married to fellow artist and book jacket designer Ralph Brooks Wilkins, she was known later in life as Cleo Wilkins.

== Early life and education ==
Born in Berkeley, California in 1895, Cleo Damianakes was one of six children from a prominent Greek American family in the San Francisco Bay Area. Her father, Nicholas P. Damianakes, was the founder and president of the California Peanut Company and a charter council member of the Holy Trinity Church, while her mother, Helen Athanasiadou Damianakes, started one of the earliest Greek American women's clubs in the United States. Cleo had four sisters, Alexandra, Marie, Stephanie, and Dorothy, with whom she performed Greek dance. She also had a brother named Solon.

Damianakes attended Oakland High School, where she contributed illustrations to Aegis, a literary journal published semi-annually by the girls at the school. As a teen, her drawings were frequently published in St. Nicholas, the national literary magazine for children. She studied at The California School of Fine Arts in San Francisco, then enrolled in a two-year course in anatomy alongside medical students at the University of California. While working on her master's degree, she created a series of mural panels instead of writing a thesis; the mural was later hung in the auditorium at Berkeley High School.

After graduating in 1918, she studied for one year at the Art Students League of New York as the recipient of the Taussig scholarship. In New York, Damianakes won first place in a mural competition at the Beaux-Arts Institute of Design, for her design featuring a group of girls dancing under eucalyptus trees. By 1920, she had developed a reputation in the American art world as "a young Greek girl from San Francisco, who has caught the poetry of the dance and whose work is more widely discussed and sought for than the work of any of the new American etchers."

== Career ==
=== Etching exhibitions ===
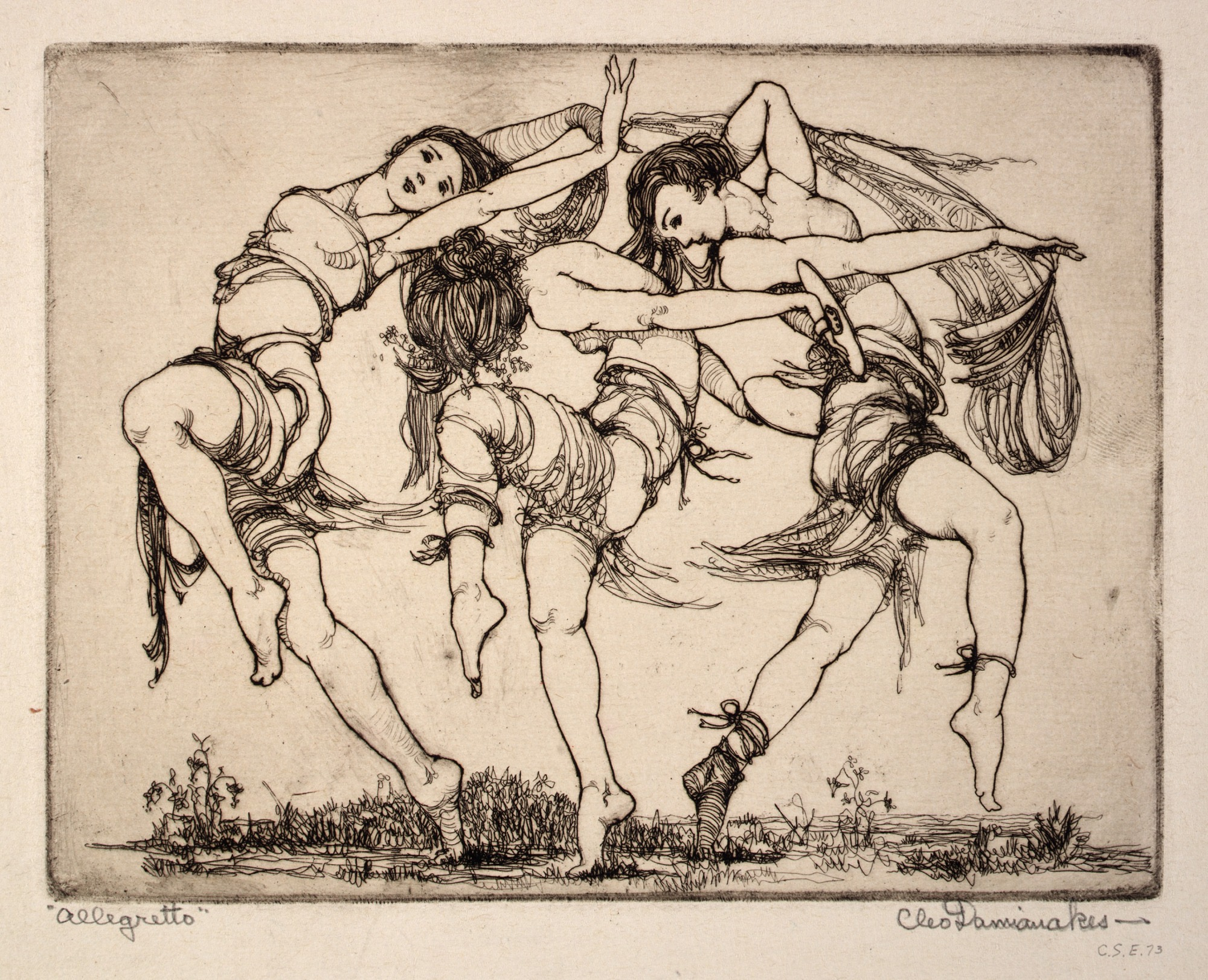
Allegretto by Damianakes was recognized in The Arts magazine as "interesting for [its] handling of the figure" (Smithsonian American Art Museum)

Damianakes's artwork was exhibited in many galleries across the United States in the early 1920s. In 1921, The New York Times Book Review and Magazine published a reprint of her etching, The Boudoir, and noted her other works featuring "trees and dancers resembling one another, pillowy anatomies", and "Rosalindish daring and gaiety and irresponsibility". (Note: The New York Times Book Review and Magazine misspelled her first name as "Clio".) In 1922, the Chicago Society of Etchers awarded Damianakes the Frank G. Logan prize for her etching Fountain. Her Allegretto, a characteristic study of three dancers, was highlighted by The New York Herald as one of the "most noticeable" prints at the "American Etchers Salon of 1922" exhibit at the Brown-Robertson Gallery.

In 1923, Damianakes's The Oak Tree, was singled out as "extraordinary" in an exhibit in Boston, where 11 of her prints were on display. After seeing her work, British art critic John Cowper Powys called her "one of the few great artists of spiritual perception that I have found in America", while The Art News noted that "She has gone back to the Greeks for motifs and her figures of dancing nymphs are at once graceful, decorative and superbly handled." Later that year, The Fruit Bearers by Damianakes was shown at the National Academy of Design in New York.

=== Covers for Hemingway ===
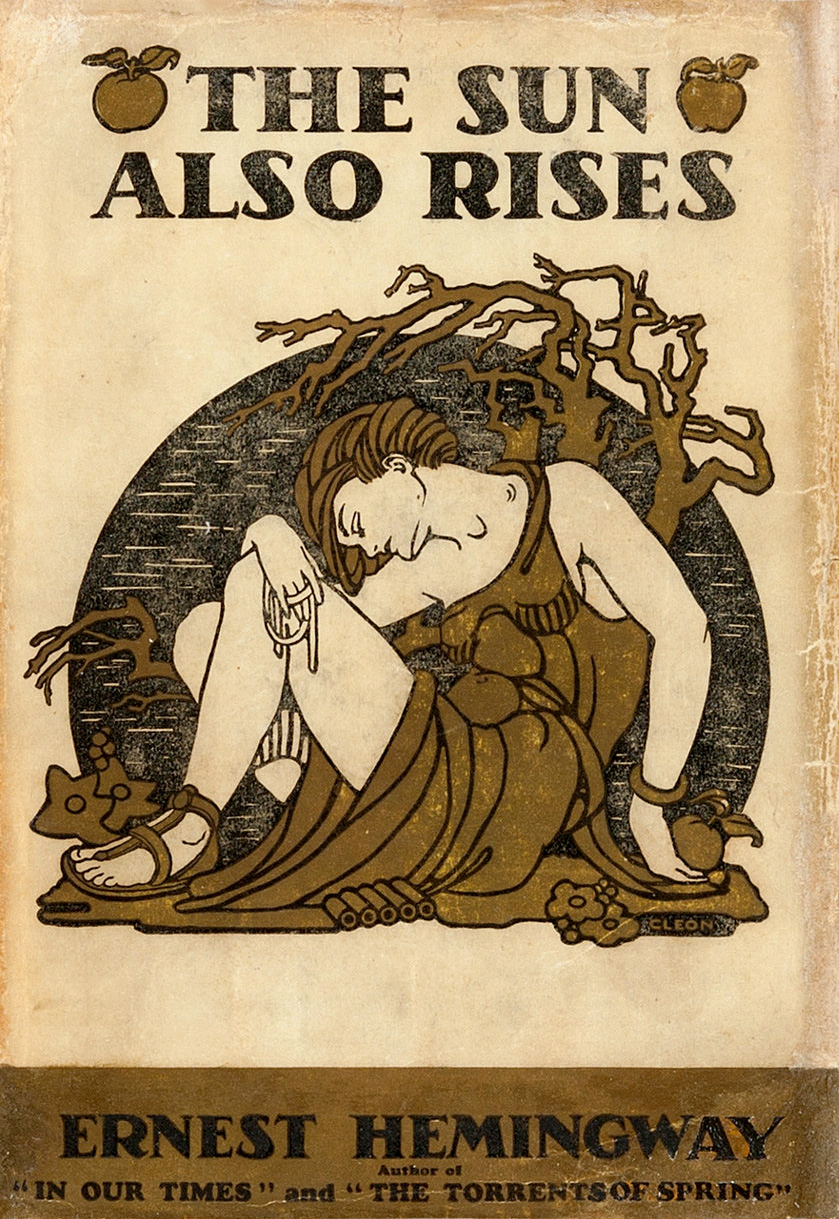
First edition of Hemingway's The Sun Also Rises, published in 1926 by Scribner's, with dust jacket illustrated by Damianakes

In 1925, "Cleon", the name she used to sign her commercial art during this period, designed the cover for the October issue of Scribner's Magazine. Editor Maxwell Perkins wrote that after persuading Charles Scribner's Sons to sign a contract with controversial up-and-coming writer Ernest Hemingway in February 1926, he chose Cleon to design the dust jacket for The Sun Also Rises, to appeal to "the feminine readers who control the destinies of so many novels".

For The Sun Also Rises, Damianakes etched a Hellenic figure lounging in front of a small desiccated tree, head bent, wearing a billowing robe exposing her left thigh. With her right hand draped over her left knee and an apple in the other hand, the design "breathed sex yet also evoked classical Greece." Author Leonard Leff writes, "What Cecile B. de Mille's 'studies in diminishing draperies' had done for Hollywood, the artist Cleonike Damianakes had done for Scribners: 'Cleon' had made sex respectable." Literary historian Catherine Turner argues that by associating his "experimental" works with images recalling ancient Greece and Rome, Perkins was "[connecting] Hemingway with a long tradition of Western culture". Published in October 1926, sales of The Sun Also Rises were strong for a debut novel, and went through three printings that year, with five more in 1927. Cleon was paid a wrap-design fee of $50 ($836 in 2022 dollars) for the dust jacket. (Note: The front cover for The Sun Also Rises contained a misspelling of the title of Hemingway's first book, referred to as In Our Times [sic]. (Trogdon, p. 45))

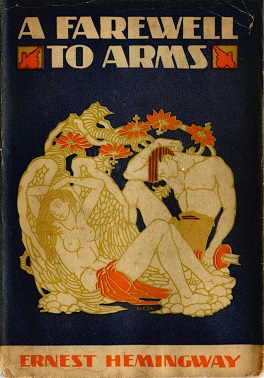
First edition of Hemingway's A Farewell to Arms, published in 1929; front cover image by Cleon was an adaptation of Botticelli's Venus and Mars

Damianakes found it more challenging to design a cover for Hemingway's A Farewell to Arms. One of her initial designs featuring helmets and artillery was rejected outright by Perkins, who explained that Scribners wanted to distinguish it from the war novels that were flooding the market. In the late summer of 1929, Damianakes submitted her final design, which echoed the cover of The Sun Also Rises in its use of classical figures. This time, the image was an art moderne adaptation of Venus and Mars by Italian Renaissance painter Sandro Botticelli. In Cleon's version, Venus is a mostly nude winged female reclining with her eyes closed, while Mars is a male figure wearing only a loin cloth, who rests his head on one arm, holding a broken axle with the other. According to author David A. Rennie, whereas the Botticelli painting implies that Venus has "exhausted her lover" Mars, symbolizing that love has overpowered war, in Cleon's adaptation, both figures "appear in repose", suggesting that love and war are equal. Design writers Steven Heller and Seymour Chwast describe the illustration as "romantic but emotionless" and that it "ever so slightly expresses the plot of Hemingway's classic".

Hemingway did not like her cover art for A Farewell to Arms, and was "scathing" in his criticism to Perkins about its "lousy and completely unattractive decadence, i.e. large misplaced breasts etc ...the awful legs on the woman or the gigantic belly muscles". In the same letter, he conceded, "I never liked the jacket on the Sun but side by side with this one The Sun jacket looks very fine now—So maybe this one is fine too..." Released in the U.S. in September 1929, A Farewell to Arms became Hemingway's first bestseller, with 100,000 copies sold in the first 12 months.

Following the success of A Farewell to Arms, Charles Scribner's Sons published Hemingway's In Our Time, a compilation of short stories which had first been published 1925 when he was relatively unknown. Once again, Cleon was selected to design the cover for the new edition of In Our Time, published by Scribners in October 1930.

=== Covers for the Fitzgeralds ===
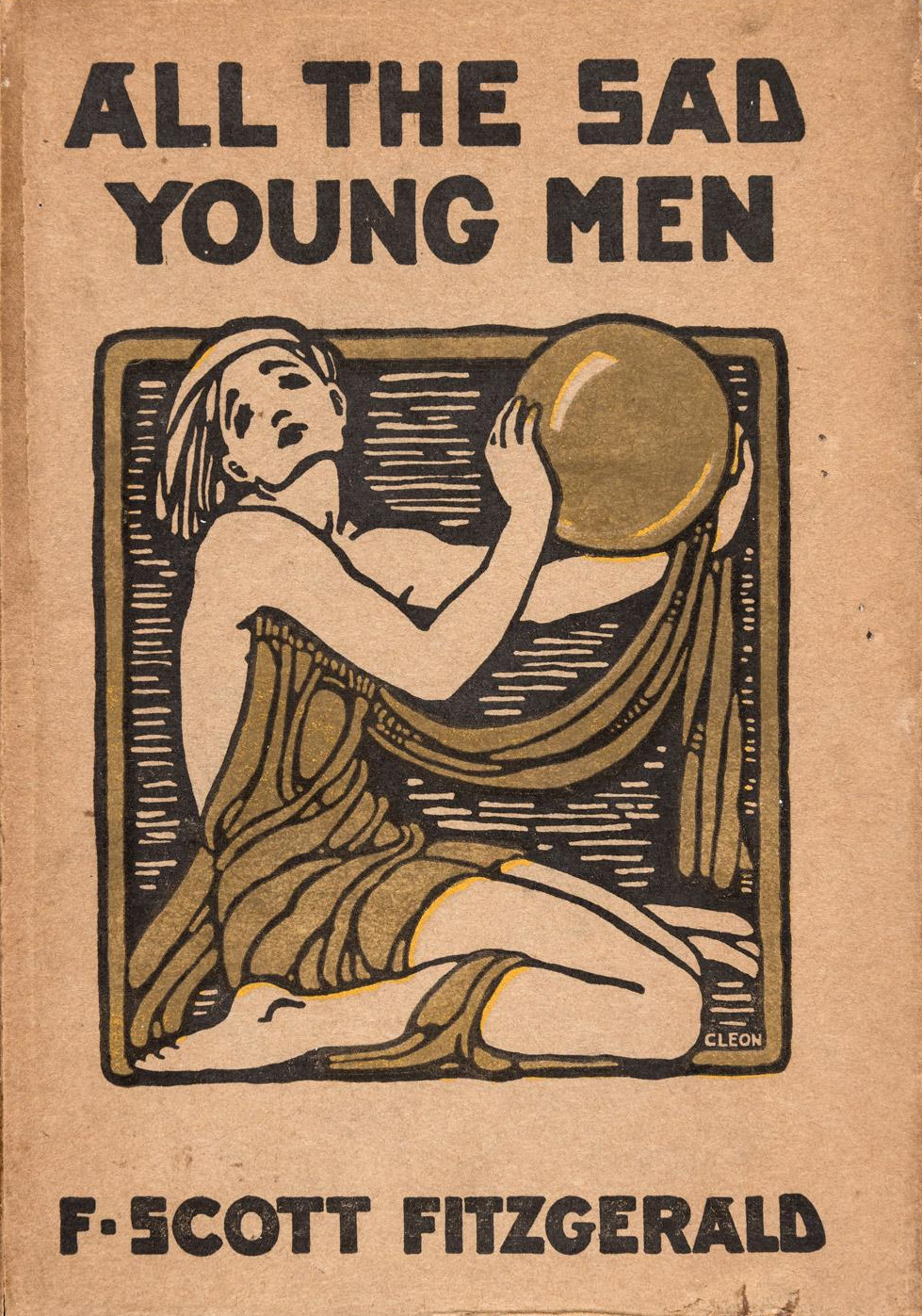
First edition cover by Cleon for Fitzgerald's All the Sad Young Men, published in 1926

Cleon illustrated the dust jacket for All the Sad Young Men, a collection of short stories by F. Scott Fitzgerald, which Scribners debuted in February 1926. The first edition sold well, with three printings of 16,170 copies in 1926. The fact that Damianakes designed the book jackets for All the Sad Young Men, The Sun Also Rises, and A Farewell to Arms earned her the reputation as a creator of cover art for the Lost Generation. One critic has suggested that because of this, "the classically inspired artwork of all three is virtually indistinguishable".

She also designed the front cover for Zelda Fitzgerald's only novel, Save Me the Waltz, published by Scribners in October 1932. The volume, which was badly edited, was a commercial failure, selling only 1,400 out of its initial run of 3,010 copies.

=== Art for other books ===
Other first-edition dust jackets designed by Damianakes for Scribners included the cover art for Conrad Aiken's Blue Voyage (1927) and Great Circle (1933); John Galsworthy's Swan Song (1928); David Hamilton's Pale Warriors (1929); and David Burnham's first novel, This Our Exile (1931). For Harper & Brothers, she designed the cover for Arthur B. Reeve's Pandora (1926).

Damianakes's career as a commercial artist declined as her style fell out of fashion, and abstract art became vogue. In 1938, The Carmel Pine Cone noted that her work had appeared in several European art magazines. In later years, she continued to enter her work into local art shows as Mrs. Cleo Wilkins, winning second prize for an oil painting from the Port Jefferson chapter of the Art League of Long Island in 1957, and second prize for her etching Girl With Fruit in Bay Shore, New York, in 1964. In 1975, her paintings and etchings were exhibited at the Parrish Art Museum, then located in Southampton, New York, under the name Cleonike Wilkins.

== Personal life ==
In 1924, she married Ralph Brooks Wilkins (1898–1986), a painter, designer, and illustrator, in Oakland, California, and was known socially as Cleo Wilkins. Born in San Jose, California, R. B. Wilkins also attended the California School of Fine Arts, and designed book jackets for Harper, Scribners, Dodd Mead & Co., Morrow, Appleton-Century, and Farrar & Rinehart. In December 1925, his artwork depicting a scene in old Chester, England, appeared on the cover of Scribner's Magazine, which noted that he was "the husband of Cleo Damianakes, who did the October cover". In 1928, he won a prize for best non-fiction book jacket of the year for The American Adventure: A History of the United States by David Saville Muzzey, published by Harper & Brothers. The Wilkins resided in Shoreham, a village on the north shore of Long Island, for many years. Cleo Damianakes Wilkins died in Alameda, California, on August 27, 1979.

== Legacy ==
Five of Cleo Damianakes's etchings are in the permanent collection of the National Gallery of Art. Her work is also in the permanent collections of the Art Institute of Chicago, the Smithsonian American Art Museum, the Indianapolis Museum of Art, and the Fine Arts Museums of San Francisco.

== Gallery ==
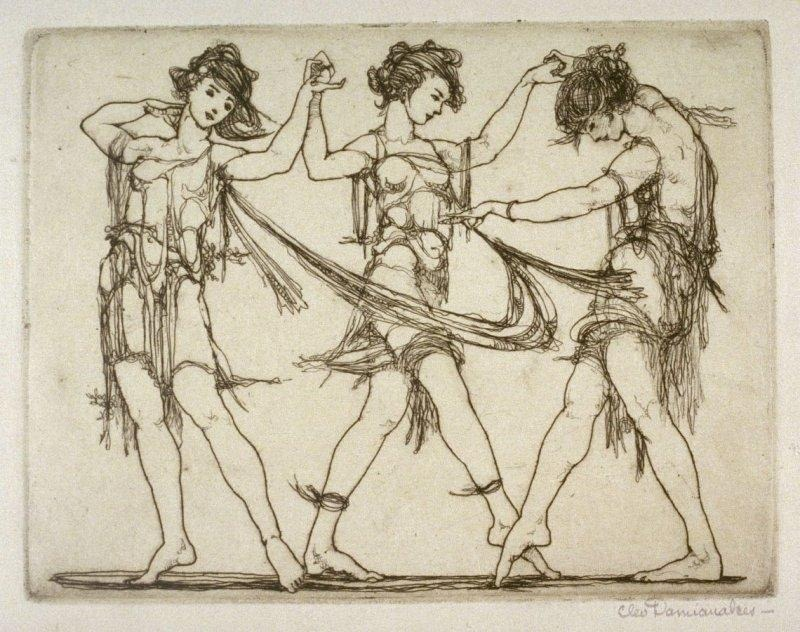
Scherzo by Cleo Damianakes, etching, c.1921. Fine Arts Museums of San Francisco.

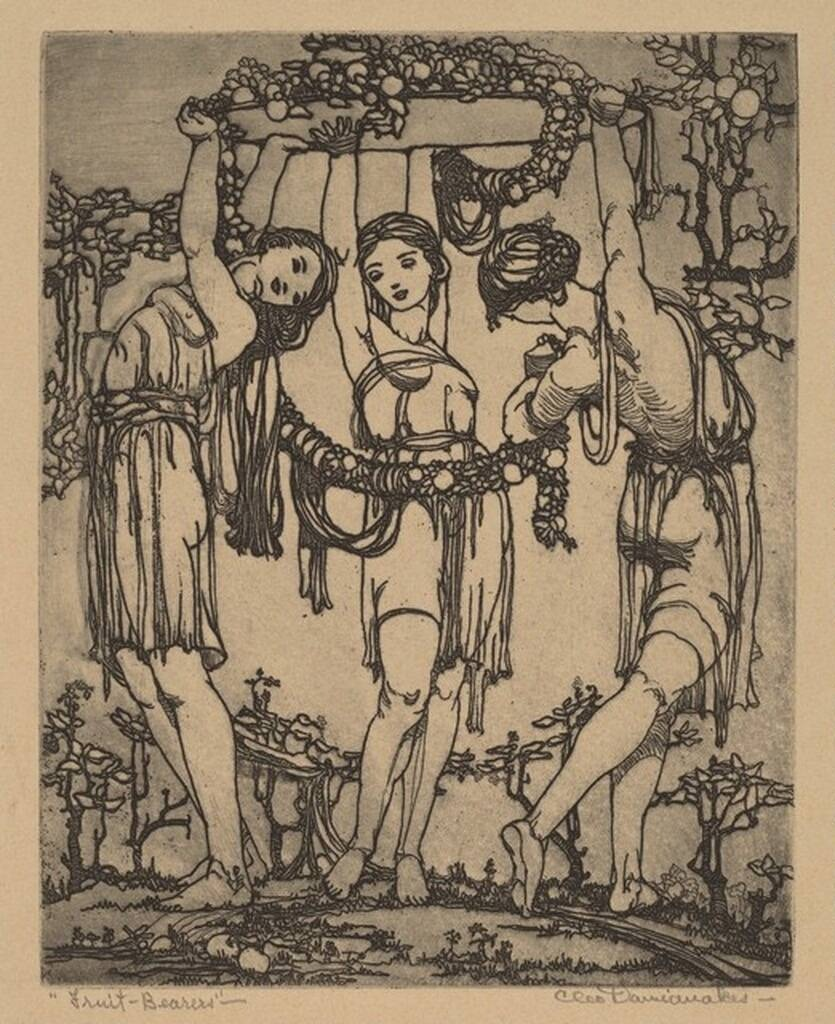
Fruit Bearers by Cleo Damianakes, etching in brown-black, c.1923. National Gallery of Art.

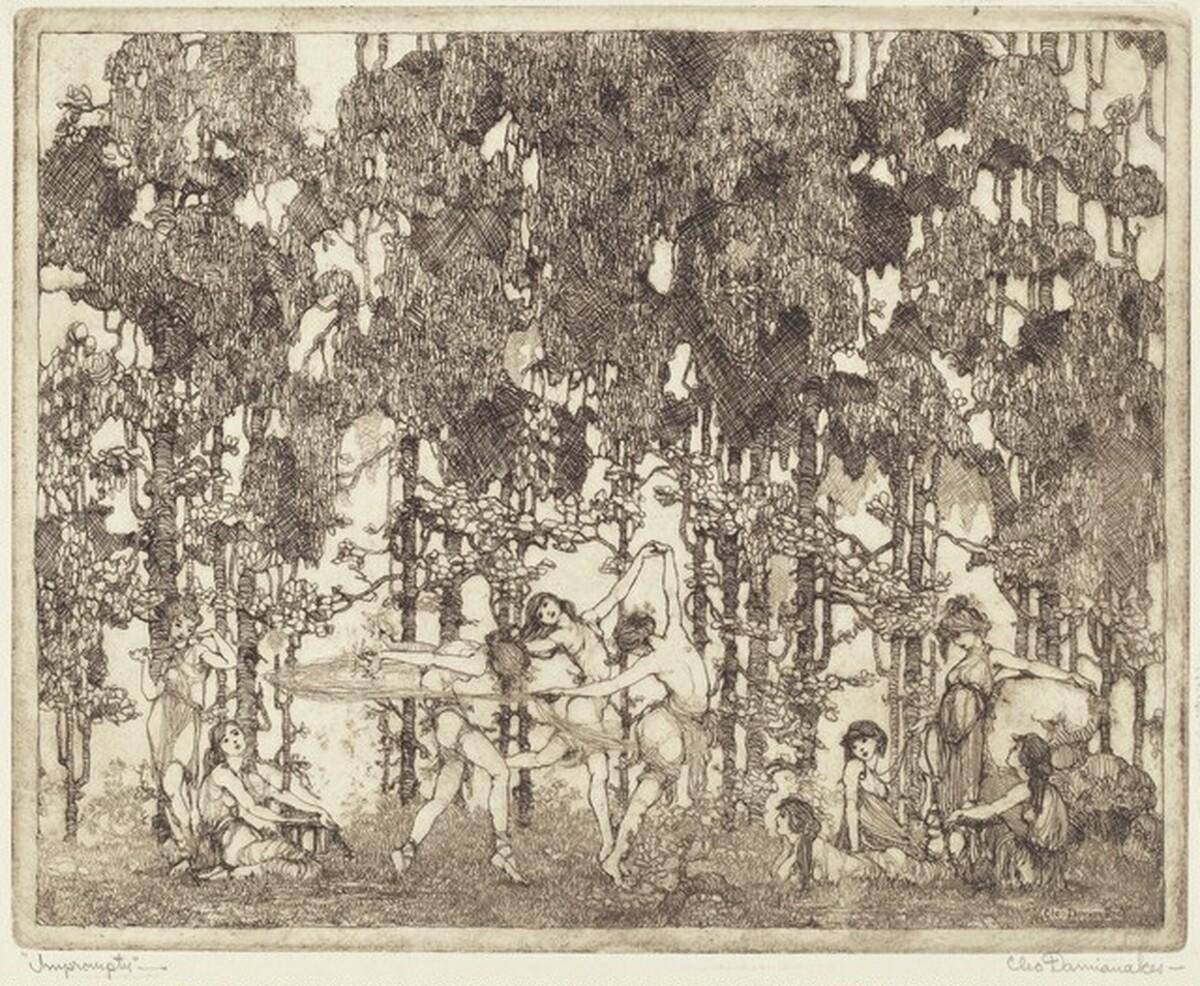
Impromptu by Cleo Damianakes, etching, c.1921. National Gallery of Art.
