= David Burnham (novelist) =

American novelist

David Burnham (March 2, 1907 – 1974), was an American novelist.

Burnham was born in Chicago, Illinois.

He was the son of Claude George Burnham, an English immigrant who was executive for the Burlington Railroad, and Mary Burnham (née Gillis) from Minnesota. His elder brother was James Burnham (1905–1987), philosopher and political theorist.

== Publications ==
- This Our Exile (New York: C. Scribners, 1931. London: P. Davies, 1931), dust jacket designed by Cleonike (Cleo Damianakes)
- Wedding Song (New York: Viking Press, 1934. London: Peter Davies, 1934)
- Winter in the Sun (New York: C. Scribners, 1937)
- Last Act in Bermuda (New York: C. Scribners, 1940)
