= David Payne (chaplain) =

British priest

The Reverend David Payne
- Church: Church of England

Orders
- Ordination: 1962 (deacon) by Harry Carpenter; 1963 (priest) by George Reindorp

Personal details
- Born: David James Payne; 12 October 1931 St John's Wood, London, England
- Died: 8 March 2014 (aged 82) Kentford, Suffolk, England
- Denomination: Anglicanism
- Education: Sherborne School
- Alma mater: Clare College, Cambridge; Wycliffe Hall, Oxford

David James Payne (12 October 1931 – 8 March 2014) was an Anglican priest. Payne held the rectorships of Shackleford, Peper Harow and Odell, and the vicarship of Pavenham at various points. He was Warden of the Divine Healing Mission from 1978 to 1984.

== Early life and education ==
Payne was born in St John's Wood, London on 12 October 1931. He attended Sherborne School, an independent boarding school in Dorset, before completing national service with the Durham Light Infantry in Egypt. In 1951, he proceeded to Clare College, Cambridge, where he completed a B.A. in 1954 and M.A. in 1961 in the natural sciences.

Payne spent three years as a biology master at Mill Hill School and Marlborough College. In 1958, he began work at Lee Abbey, Devon, and promptly trained for ordination at Wycliffe Hall, Oxford, graduating with a B.A. (Hons) in 1960.

== Ordained ministry ==
Payne was ordained as a deacon in 1962 at Christ Church, Oxford by Harry Carpenter, Bishop of Oxford, and as a priest in 1963 at Guildford Cathedral by George Reindorp, Bishop of Guildford. He began his career as a curate at Great Faringdon from 1962 to 1963 and Christ Church, Guildford from 1963 to 1966. In 1966, he was appointed to two rectorships: Shackleford and Peper Harow, which he left in 1973 to accept the rectorship of Odell and vicarship of Pavenham.

In 1978, Payne left Odell and Pavenham and was given the post of Warden of the Divine Healing Mission. (Note: The Divine Healing Mission (later renamed the Crowhurst Christian Healing Centre) was a revival of the Ministry of Healing by the Church of England. It is located in Crowhurst, East Sussex.) In 1984, he left the Divine Healing Mission and was given the rectorship of Wraxall, Somerset. He retired to Cambridge in 1992.

== Death ==
Payne died in Kentford, Suffolk on 8 March 2014. His funeral was held on 1 April at St Mary's Church, Burwell.
