= Ibbie McColm Wilson =

American poet

- Born: Ibbie McColm; February 18, 1834; Baltimore, Maryland, U.S.
- Died: 1908 (aged 73–74); Oxford, Iowa, U.S.
- Resting place: Oxford Cemetery; Oxford, Iowa
- Occupation: poet
- Spouse: Col. Thomas J. Wilson (m. 1876)
- Writing career
- Pen name: I. McC. Wilson
- Language: English
- Genre: poetry

Ibbie McColm Wilson (née, McColm; pen name, I. McC. Wilson; February 18, 1834 – 1908) was an American poet of the long nineteenth century. She also worked as a translator, assisted her husband in his publishing business, and was employed by various newspapers. Wilson was the author of The Fate of the Leaf (1891) and Miscellaneous poems (1909).

== Early life and education ==
Ibbie McColm was born in Baltimore, Maryland, February 18, 1834. She was of Scotch-Irish parentage and traced ancestry back to one Lord Burke.

Spending her childhood and young adulthood in Baltimore, she was educated in the schools of that city, becoming a proficient English scholar and later, a skilled student and translator of German, Latin, Greek, and Hebrew.

== Career ==
She spent several years teaching in the schools of Maryland and Pennsylvania. In 1858, she removed to Iowa, teaching several years in Johnson, Iowa, and Benton counties. The family removing to Cleveland, Ohio, in 1863, she remained eight or nine years there, after which she spent some time again in Iowa with her sister.

In 1876, after returning to Baltimore, she married Col. Thomas J. Wilson. He was engaged in the publishing business, and she became his assistant. They lived there for nine or ten years before his death. Upon becoming a widow, she took up his work. Besides being engaged in the work of translating, Wilson was employed by The Baltimore Sun and The Maryland Journal and other newspapers, and also contributed articles to leading magazines. Most of her work was not preserved "Shema Yisrael Adonay Elohainu Alonay Echod", "Paraphrase of a Portion of the Forty-Second Psalm", "The Sentinel of the Ages", and "Ode" are included in A Hebrew Anthology: Lyrical, narrative and devotional poems (1913).

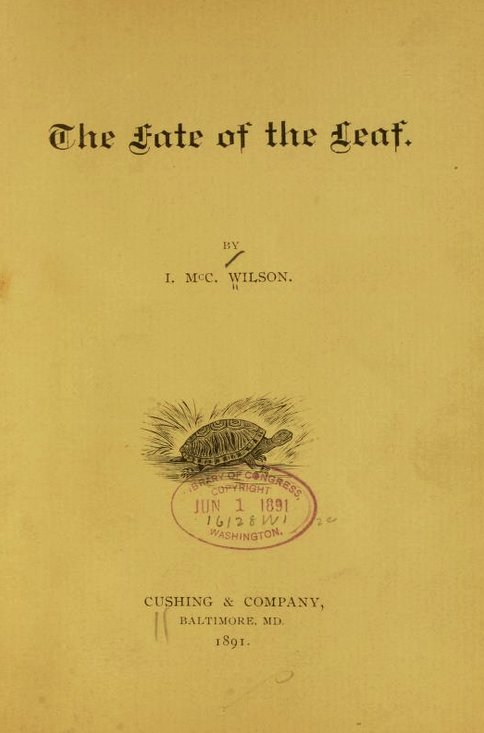

As "I. McC. Wilson", she published in 1891 a volume in blank verse entitled The Fate of the Leaf, an allegory of human life. The plaintive note that echoes through many parts of the work suggests the common lot of poets "who learn in suffering what they teach in song". Wilson's verse displays at times vigor as well as ease and grace in the process of fusing words into effective and striking combinations such as readily lend themselves to the purposes of quotation. Her vocabulary is marked by unusual discrimination and some of the similies are conceived with felicity of judgment.

In 1892, Wilson went to Europe where she spent about a year visiting the principal cities and points of historical interest in Great Britain and on the continent. Returning to the U.S., a couple of years were spent in New York City engaged in the same work as she had been in Baltimore, after which she returned to Baltimore.

== Death and legacy ==
Wilson removed to Iowa in 1905, remaining at the home of her only sister, Mary Louise Miller, in Oxford, until her death, May 8, 1908.

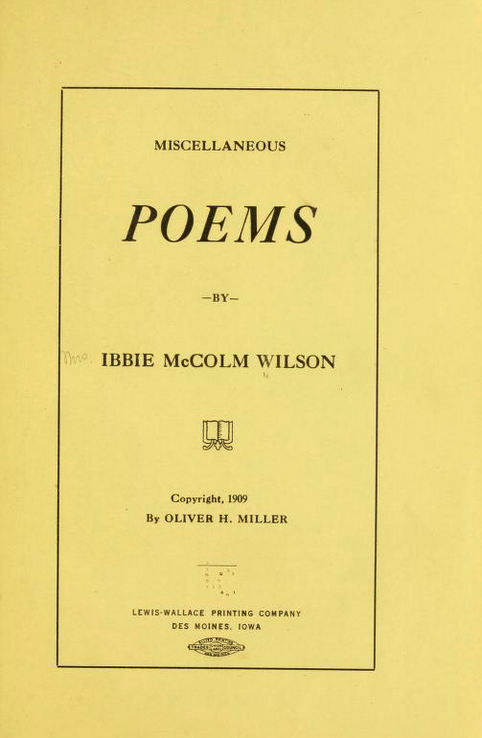

A volume of Wilson's poems, entitled Miscellaneous poems, was published posthumously at Des Moines, Iowa in 1909, with a brief memoir. A number of these poems are marked by far more than ordinary merit and by a rare facility in the employment of rhyming verse.

== Selected works ==
- The Fate of the Leaf, 1891
- Miscellaneous poems, 1909
