= Mary Sinton Leitch =

American writer, poet, and editor

Mary Sinton Leitch (7 September 1876 – 20 August 1954) was an American writer, poet, and editor, who helped to found the Poetry Society of Virginia.

== Personal life ==
Mary Sinton Lewis was born in New York City in 1876, daughter of Charlton Thomas and Nancy Dunlap McKeen Lewis. She attended Smith College and Columbia University, and studied in France and Germany.

She married John David Leitch in 1907, and they settled in Lynnhaven, Virginia. Their home became, according to The Poetry Review "a centre for much of the poetry life of the Virginia tidewater." They had a daughter and a son: Charlton Leitch Harrell and John Leitch. She was a longtime friend and correspondent of illustrator and author J. J. Lankes.

Leitch died in August 1954 and is buried in Virginia Beach, Virginia.

== Career ==
She worked as a women's prison inspector in New York City, before becoming a contributing editor for various magazines and newspapers. She was also an assistant editor of The Historians’ History of the World. She remained active as an editor, including compiling the anthology Lyric Virginia Today, a collection of poetry by living Virginians. Writing, however, became her principal focus.

Between 1922 and 1952, Leitch published seven collections of poetry and short fiction. She contributed to the Virginia Quarterly Review, Harper's Magazine, Poet Lore, The Personalist, and many others. In The Music Makers: an Anthology of Recent American Poetry (1945) Stanton Coblentz described Leitch's work as "predominantly of a lyrical nature, sometimes touched with graceful whimsies." She was called "a gifted lyricist".

Leitch was a founder of the Poetry Society of Virginia, becoming its president in 1933, and co-president 1944-1945.

== Bibliography ==
- The Wagon and the Star (1922)
- The Unrisen Morrow (1926)
- The Black Moon (1929)
- Spider Architect (1937)
- From Invisible Mountains (1943)
- Himself and I (1950)
- Nightingales on the Moon (1952)
