= Escape of 28 enslaved people from Maryland (1857) =

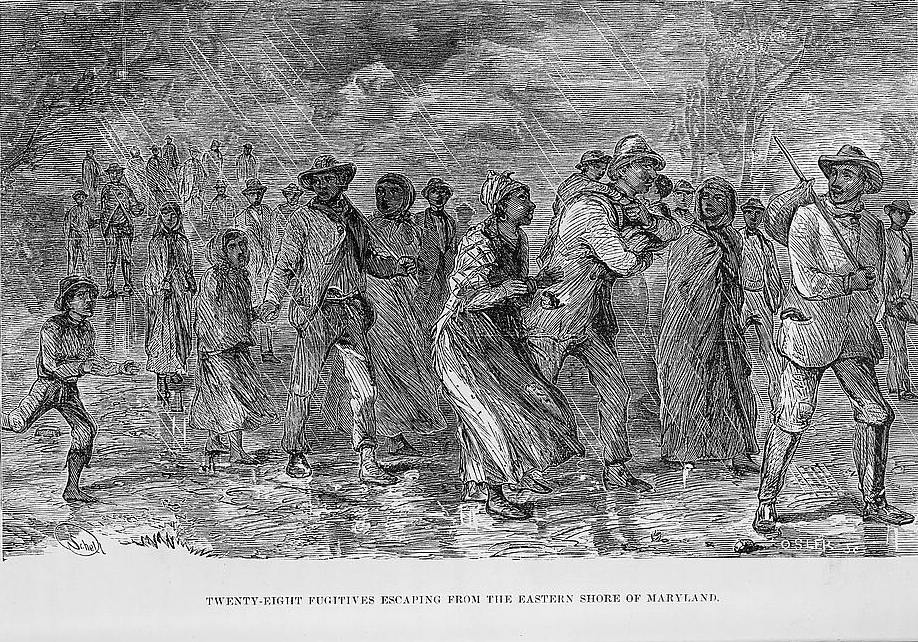
Twenty-eight enslaved men, women and children escaping from the Eastern Shore of Maryland

A group of 28 enslaved people from Maryland escaped their slaveholders on October 24, 1857. They were a group of two dozen enslaved men, women, and children who fled from Dorchester County, Maryland. Four men joined their group to travel north along the Underground Railroad.

On the night of October 24, 1857, twenty-four individuals escaped from enslavers in Dorchester County, Maryland. The group included Willis Brannock, Jane Cator, Rueben E. Phillips, Richard Keene, Samuel Pattison, and Rev. Levi D. Travers. The escape was significant due to the size of the group which included infants and children and their ability to navigate heavy rainfall during the journey.

Aaron and Daffney Comish ran away with six of their children, one of which was a two-week-old baby. Daffney and six of their children were owned by Jane Cator and Rueben E. Phillips, Jane's step-father. Two of their children who were teenagers unable to be included in the escape because they had been hired out away from the rest of the family. Aaron was owned by Rev. Levi D. Travers. There were two families who ran away from Samuel Pattison. Susan Viney and her four children, Lloyd, Frank, Albert(a), and nine-month-old J.W. were held by Pattison. Viney's husband Joe, who was hired out to work in Dorchester County by a Virginia planter, ran away with his family, which also included his three older sons, Henry, Joe, and Tom. Leah and Kit Anthony ran away with their young children Adam, Mary, and one-year-old Murray. Alice Hill and her son Henry, both of whom were free, ran away with their husband and father, Joseph Hill. Joseph's 25-year-old sister Sarah Jane, who was hired out to another plantation also escaped. Joseph and Sarah Jane were also owned by Pattison. Over the first three days it rained heavily and their group grew to 28 people when Marshall Dutton, George and Solomon Light, and Silas Long joined them. They prepared for run-ins with slave capturers by carrying pistols, knives, and other weapons.

It was a group of 28 freedom seekers, including seventeen children and two infants, who met up with William Brinkley and his associates who took them north to Centerville in the Wilmington area. Wilmington was generally a dangerous place because slave catchers looked for runaways there, but it was even more so when news circulated about this large group that was heading north, so they avoided going into the center of Wilmington. Samuel Pattison was also catching up with them. In an effort to outrun any slave catchers, Brinkley drove his carriage too fast and it broke down and the horse was injured. The group, especially the children, were exhausted, cold, hungry and ill. Some of the people were barefoot. Word got to Thomas Garrett by the 31st that most of the group was in Centreville, which he relayed to William Still. There was a 14-year-old-boy who became separated from the rest of the group.

Irishmen attacked eighteen of the runaways and a black conductor named Jackson with clubs. One of the runaways shot or stabbed one of the Irishmen. The fugitives split into smaller groups and went to a number of places outside of Philadelphia. They pushed through unusually heavy snowstorms throughout November. Most of the group made it to St. Catharines, Ontario, Canada.
