= Sonya Koshkina =

Ukrainian journalist (born 1985)

Sonya Koshkina Соня Кошкіна
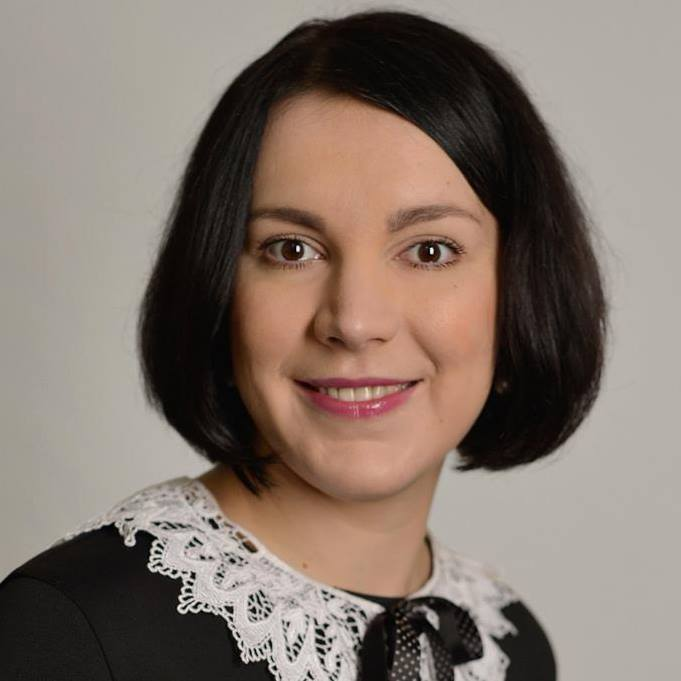
- Born: Kseniia Mykytivna Vasylenko; Ксенія Микитівна Василенко; July 8, 1985 (age 41); Kyiv, Ukrainian SSR, Soviet Union (now Ukraine)
- Education: Taras Shevchenko National University of Kyiv; National University Odesa Law Academy
- Occupations: journalist; editor-in-chief

Kseniia Mykytivna Vasylenko (Ukrainian: Ксенія Микитівна Василенко; born July 8, 1985), better known by the pen name Sonya Koshkina (Ukrainian: Со́ня Ко́шкіна), (Note: National romanization: Sonia Koshkina, alternate romanizations: Sonja Koškina and Soni︠a︡) is a Ukrainian journalist, who is also co-owner and editor-in-chief of the online publication, LB.ua.

== Early life and education ==
Ksenia Mykytivna Vasilenko was born in Kyiv, Ukrainian SSR, 1985. Her father is Mykita Kimovych Vasilenko, a lecturer at Taras Shevchenko National University of Kyiv (Kyiv National University; KNU). During the period of 1998–2002, she studied at the School of Young Journalists "Yun-Press" at the Kyiv Palace of Children and Youth. After graduating, she taught there for two years.

== Career ==
She served as a correspondent of the newspaper The Day ("Den") (2003–05). In September 2005, she started working for the online publication Obozrevatel. It was then, at the suggestion of the site's editor-in-chief, Oleg Medvedev, that she took a pseudonym.

Koshkina graduated in 2007 from the Institute of Journalism, KNU. Dissatisfied with her education, she entered the graduate school of National University Odesa Law Academy, majoring in "Philosophy of Law". Since 2008, she has been teaching at the Gorshenin Institute in Kyiv.

In May 2012, she defended her dissertation at Taras Shevchenko National University of Kyiv titled "Online publications as a factor in the formation of democratic and political culture," earning the degree of Candidate of Political Sciences. In October, the Shevchenkivskyi District Court, following a lawsuit by Serhii Rudenko, Deputy Dean for Research at the Faculty of Philosophy of the same university, annulled the degree due to detected plagiarism.

Koshkina claimed she was being persecuted by a staff member of the Presidential Administration, Andriy Portnov. In May 2015, the High Administrative Court overturned that decision.

In June 2009, leaving Obozrevatel, she became the editor-in-chief and co-owner of the Livyi Bereh online publication.

In October 2019, she defended her PhD dissertation in KNU, where she taught journalism.

Koshkina is affiliated with the YouTube project, "Kishkina", and the author of, Maydan. An Untold Story.

== Personal life ==
On May 23, 2019, Koshkina gave birth to a daughter named Esther.

== Selected works ==
- Maydan. An Untold Story.

== Awards ==
- 2015: Winner of the All-Ukrainian Prize "Woman of the Third Millennium" in the nomination "Rating"
- 2019: Masters category, Top 100 most influential women in Ukraine, Focus magazine
