= Mameve Medwed =

American novelist (1942–2021)

- Born: December 9, 1942; Bangor, Maine, U.S.
- Died: December 26, 2021 (aged 79); Cambridge, Massachusetts, U.S.
- Education: Simmons College
- Website: www.mamevemedwed.com

Mameve S. Medwed (December 9, 1942 – December 26, 2021) was an American novelist. She was the author of Mail, Host Family, The End of an Error, How Elizabeth Barrett Browning Saved My Life (for which she received a 2007 Massachusetts Book Awards Fiction Honor), Of Men and Their Mothers, and Minus Me.

== Name ==
Medwed's first name is pronounced "May-Meeve". According to her website, she was named for her two grandmothers, Mamie and Eva.

== Life and career ==
Medwed was born in Bangor, Maine, where she was raised, on December 9, 1942, to a Jewish family. She received a B.A. with honors from Simmons College. Medwed taught fiction writing at The Cambridge Center for Adult Education since 1979, mentored in the MFA in Creative Writing program at Lesley University from 1986 to 1988, and was the 1996 Robert M. Gay Memorial Lecturer at the Department of English at Simmons College. Medwed continued to give readings and lectures and participated in library panels and book festivals in later life.

Her short stories, essays, and book reviews have appeared in, among others, The New York Times, Gourmet, Yankee, Redbook, Playgirl, The Boston Globe, Ascent, The Missouri Review, Confrontation, Newsday and The Washington Post. Her essay, "Oh, Lord. Oh, Lourdes. Alors!", appeared in the anthology How to Spell Chanukah, published by Algonquin Books of Chapel Hill in 2007.

Medwed lived in Cambridge, Massachusetts, where she died from lung cancer on December 26, 2021, at the age of 79.

== Novels ==
- Mail (1997)
- Host Family (2000)
- The End of an Error (2003)
- How Elizabeth Barrett Browning Saved My Life (2006)
- Of Men and Their Mothers (2008)
- Minus Me (2021)
