= Louise Collier Willcox =

American author, editor, anthologist, translator, suffragist (1865–1929)

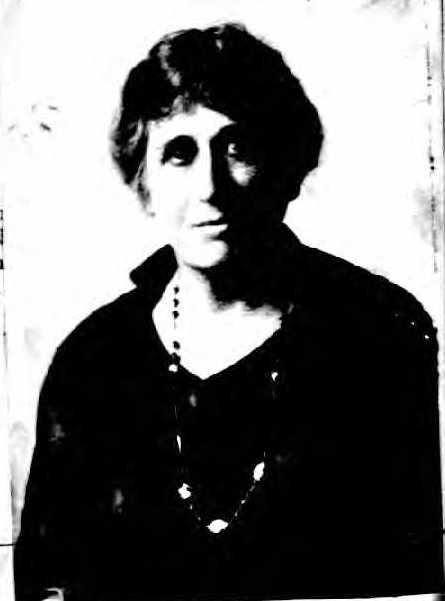
- Born: Louise Price Collier; April 24, 1865; Chicago, Illinois, U.S.
- Died: September 13, 1929 (aged 64); Paris, France
- Resting place: Elmwood Cemetery, Norfolk, Virginia, U.S.
- Education: Conservatory of Leipzig
- Occupations: author, editor, anthologist, translator, suffragist
- Spouse: James Westmore Willcox (m. 1890)
- Children: 2
- Writing career
- Pen name: Clarence Wellford

Louise Collier Willcox (née, Collier; pen name, Clarence Wellford; April 24, 1865 – September 13, 1929) was an American author, editor, anthologist, translator, and suffragist. During her career, she worked for Harper's Weekly, Harper's Bazaar, North American Review, Macmillan Publishers, and E. P. Dutton & Co. Willcox was the author of several books, and she contributed to several magazines and newspapers, sometimes using a pseudonym. Her publications included, Answers of the Ages, The Human Way (1908), and A Manual of Spiritual Fortification (1910). She died suddenly in Paris, France, age 64.

== Early life and education ==
Louise Price Collier was born in Chicago, Illinois, on April 24, 1865. Her parents were Reverend Robert Laird Collier and Mary (Price) Collier.

She was educated by private tutors in France, Germany, and England, and also attended the Conservatory of Leipzig from 1881 to 1882. Her literary training came mainly through personal conversations and study with her father and his friends, among whom were Matthew Arnold, Lord Tennyson, Ralph Waldo Emerson, Henry Wadsworth Longfellow, and Baron Tauchnitz.

== Career ==
On June 25, 1890, in Norfolk, Virginia, she married James Westmore Willcox, a prominent lawyer of that city. They had two children, a daughter, Christine Price Willcox Capelli (1893–1967) and a son, James Westmore Willcox, Jr. (1894–1971).

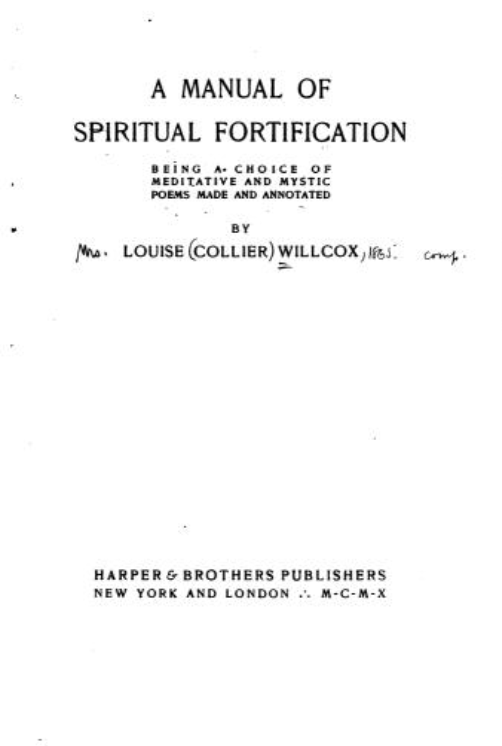
A Manual of Spiritual Fortification, 1910

Her life was largely devoted to literary occupations of various kinds. For quite a time, she was an editorial writer for Harper's Weekly and a contributor to Harper's Bazaar. From 1896 to 1903, she was on the staff of the North American Review. From 1903 to 1909, she was reader and literary adviser to Macmillan Publishers. From 1910 to 1917, she worked for E. P. Dutton & Co. She was a contributor to Century, Outlook, and New York Evening Post. She also contributed to Chap Book and to East and West under the pen name "Clarence Wellford". Willcox was the author of several publications including, Answers of the Ages; The Human Way (1908, essays); A Manual of Spiritual Fortification, (1910, an anthology of mystic poems); and "The Road to Joy" (1912, essay).

Willcox favored women's suffrage and was the honorary vice-president of the Equal Suffrage League of Virginia. She was prominent in matters connected with literature and art in the city of Norfolk. She was a member of the National Institute of Social Sciences, the MacDowell Club of New York City, and the Poetry Society of America.

== Death ==
In July 1929, Willcox traveled abroad and died suddenly in Paris, France, on September 13, 1929. The Louise Collier Willcox papers are held by the Albert and Shirley Small Special Collections Library at the University of Virginia.

== Selected works ==
=== Books ===
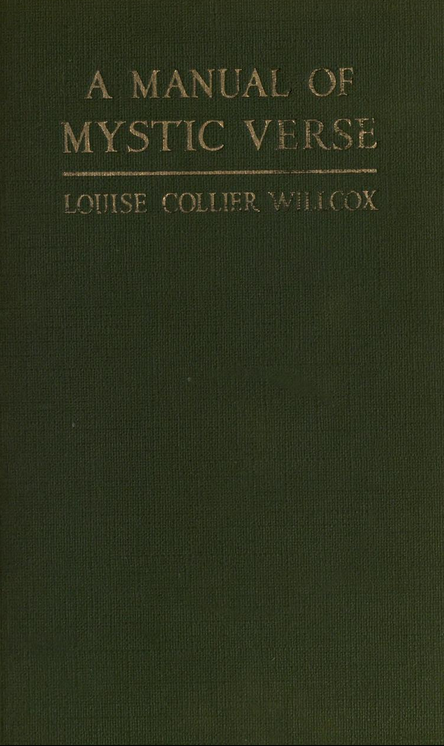
A Manual of Mystic Verse, 1917

- Answers of the Ages, 1900
- The Human Way, 1908
- A Manual of Spiritual Fortification, 1910
- A Manual of Spiritual Verse, 1917
- The House in Order, 1917

=== Essays ===
- "The Road to Joy", 1912
