= Julia Ditto Young =

American novelist, poet

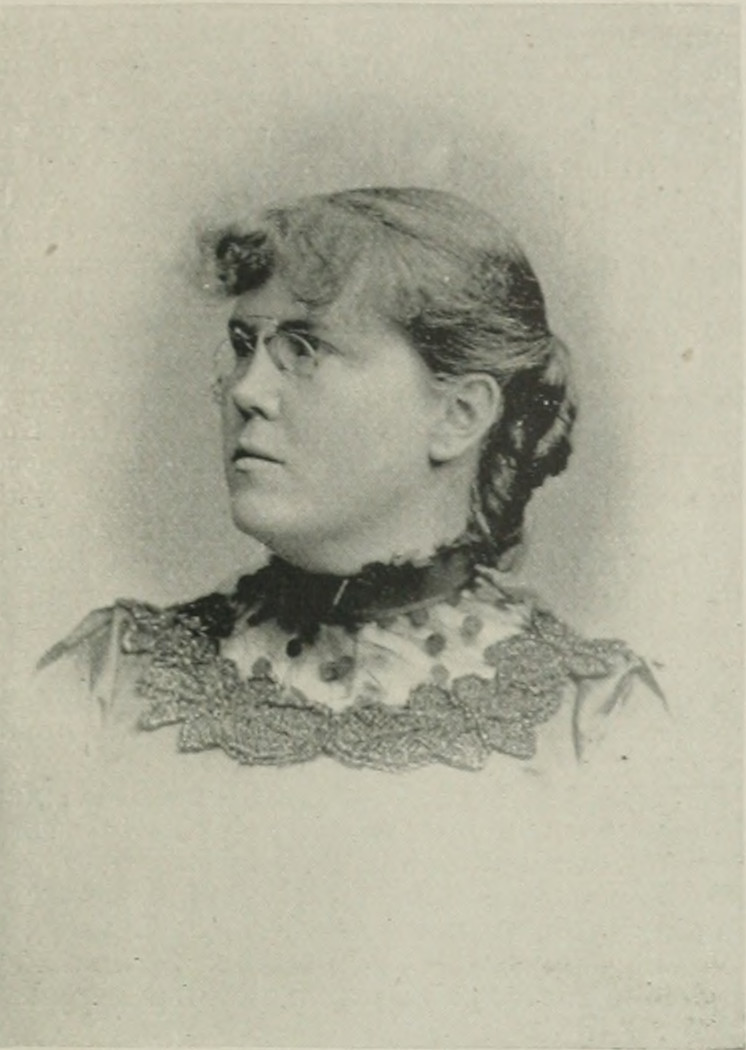
- Photo in A Woman of the Century
- Born: Julia Evelyn Ditto; December 4, 1857; Buffalo, New York
- Died: April 19, 1915 (aged 57)
- Resting place: Forest Lawn Cemetery, Buffalo, New York
- Education: State Normal School, Buffalo
- Occupations: Poet, novelist
- Spouse: Robert D. Young (m. 1876)
- Writing career
- Language: English

Julia Ditto Young (née, Ditto; December 4, 1857 – April 19, 1915) was an American poet and novelist. Her first literary effort was dated to her childhood days, her first appearance in print being in local newspapers. The first money earned by her writing was in the amount of US$10 from Peterson's Magazine. She continued to write for Peterson's, and for several years wrote for Frank Leslie's publications. Young was the author of a number of short stories, which were noted for the versatility of literary talent they displayed. She also won recognition with her poetry. Adrift, a Story of Niagara was published in 1889, while Thistle Down: poems (1893) contained much of what had previously appeared in different journals.

== Early life and education ==
Julia Evelyn Ditto was born in Buffalo, New York, December 4, 1857. Her father, the late John A. Ditto, was a civil engineer who twice served as city engineer of Buffalo. Her mother, Mrs. Margaret McKenna Ditto, became a successful painter in oils. Young was the niece of Margaret Emma Ditto, of Wellesley, Massachusetts, writer of humorous and original boys' stories.

She was educated in the grammar and in the State Normal School of Buffalo (now Buffalo State College).

Young's first literary efforts date back to her early childhood. Once, when she was about six years old, she complained to her mother with bitter weeping that her sister had purloined her chief treasure. "'Tis only a button tied to a string!" said the younger girl with scorn. "I don't care, it's my leading character, and my story can't go on without it!" was the reply. As soon as she had learned to write, she utilized her accomplishment to commit to paper a gloomy poem, "The Earl's Bride", as well as various verses and tales.

== Career ==
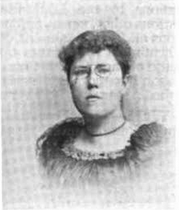
Young in Magazine of Poetry, 1895

After completing a thorough educational course, she married Robert D. Young, December 30, 1876. Mr. Young was a cashier of the Erie County Savings Bank. Two sons were born to them. The elder, Sydney, was born October 22, 1877, and died March 28, 1882; the younger was named Lawrence.

Her first appearance in print was in the Buffalo Evening Post, of September 13, 1871, the opening words of the story, "Shriek upon shriek rent the air, mingled with yells," being startling enough to attract the attention of editor and reader. Shortly afterward, the Buffalo Express printed an article from her on Fort Erie, its jaunty inaccuracies calling forth from several villagers indignant responses. A little later, the first money she earned by writing came to her for US$10 from Peterson's Magazine. She continued to write for Peterson's, and for several years wrote a great deal for Frank Leslie's publications. Many of her works were short stories. Young also won praise with her poetry and made some translations of French and German poems into English verse. In November, 1889, she published a successful novel, Adrift: A Story of Niagara, the plot of which was laid in the neighborhood of Niagara Falls.

== Personal life ==
Young made her home on Bouck Avenue, Buffalo.

Julia Ditto Young died April 19, 1915, and was buried at Forest Lawn Cemetery.

== Selected works ==
- Adrift : a story of Niagara, 1889
- Thistle Down: Poems, 1893
- This Then is the Story of Glynne's Wife Told in Numbers, 1896
- The story of Saville : told in numbers, 1897
- Black Evan. A tale of the "Forty-five". In verse. [With a portrait.], 1901
- Index and concordance to that cyclopedia of comment, the philistine magazine, Elbert Hubbard, editor : volumes I to XX, 1906?
- Barham Beach: A Poem of Regeneration, 1908
- Sonnet to Theodore Roosevelt on his departure for Africa, March, 1909., 1909
- Lines, 1915
