= Annie Maria Barnes =

American novelist (1857–1933 or 43)

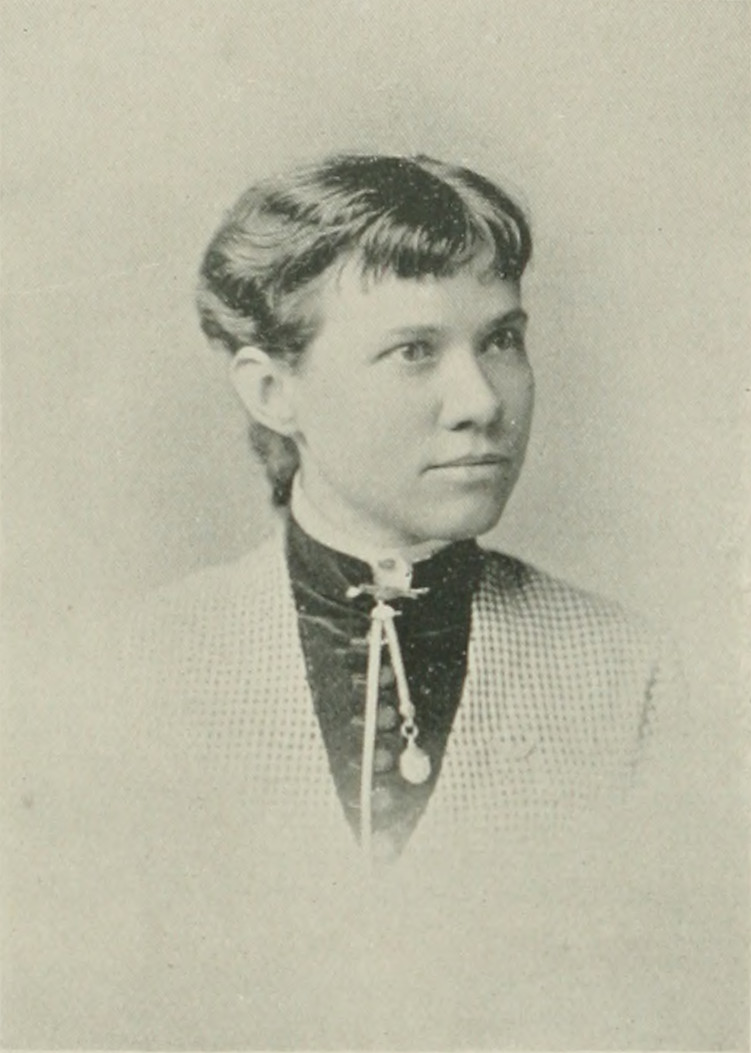
- Photo in A Woman of the Century
- Born: Annie Maria Barnes; May 28, 1857; Columbia, South Carolina, U.S.
- Died: October 21, 1933, or December 31, 1943
- Occupation: Author
- Writing career
- Pen name: "Cousin Annie"
- Language: English
- Genres: juvenile literature, novels
- Subject: missionary stories
- Notable work: The Acanthus

Annie Maria Barnes (pen name, Cousin Annie; May 28, 1857 – October 21, 1933, or December 31, 1943) was a 19th-century American journalist, editor, and author from South Carolina. At the age of eleven, she wrote an article for the Atlanta Constitution, and at the age of fifteen, she became a regular correspondent of that journal. In 1887, she began publishing The Acanthus, a juvenile paper published in the Southern United States. Barnes published novels from 1887 (Some lowly lives and the heights they reached) until at least 1927 (A knight of Carolina).

== Early life and education ==
Annie Maria Barnes was born in Columbia, South Carolina, May 28, 1857. She was a daughter of James Daniel and Henrietta Jackson Neville Barnes. Her mother, a Neville, traced her descent in a direct line from the Earl of Warwick. At the end of the American Civil War, he family like most Southerners, was left with limited financial means.

Barnes was educated in the public schools of Atlanta, Georgia. She came from a family of editors, and naturally turned to literature. When 11 years of age, she wrote an article for the Atlanta Constitution, which was published and favorably noticed by the editor, and at 15, she became a regular correspondent of that journal.

== Career ==
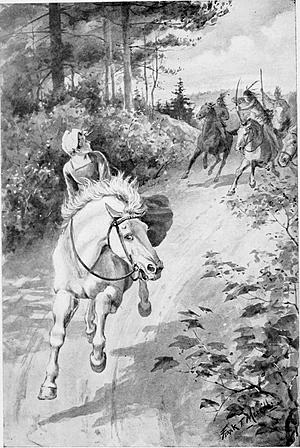
A Lass of Dorchester (1904)

Before reaching middle age, Barnes had gained recognition in southern juvenile literature. Many of Barnes's earlier works appeared in the Sundayschool Visitor (juvenile periodical; Methodist Episcopal Church, South, Nashville, Tennessee). Barnes served as junior editor for the Woman's Board of Missions, Methodist Episcopal Church, South, having charge of its juvenile paper and of all its quarterly supplies of literature. She was a frequent contributor to leading journals, including Godey's Lady's Book. She served as the editor of Young Christian Worker and the Little Worker (Methodist Episcopal Church periodicals). In 1887, she began publishing a juvenile paper called The Acanthus (juvenile periodical; Atlanta; 1877–84), which was one of two juvenile papers published in the South at the time. While in literary character, it was a success, financially, like so many other southern publications, it was a failure.

Barnes's first book was Some Lowly Lives (Nashville, 1885); and it was followed by The Life of David Livingston (Nashville, Brigham and Smith; 1887), and Scenes in Pioneer Methodism (Nashville, Brigham and Smith; 1889). Later, she wrote The Children of the Kalahari, a child's story of Africa, which was very successful in the United States and in England. She published two books in 1892, The House of Grass and Atlanta Ferryman: A Story of the Chattahoochee. Among her numerous stories which proved to be quite popular, were: Gospel Among the Slaves, The Ferry Maid of the Chattahoochee (Philadelphia, Penn Publishing Company), "ow Achon-hoah Found the Light (Richmond, Presbyterian Committee of Publication), Matouchon, The Outstretched Hand, Carmio, Little Burden-Sharers, Chonite, Marti, The King's Gift, The Red Miriok, The Little Lady of the Fort, Little Betty Blew, Mistress Moppet, A Lass of Dorchester (Boston, Lee and Shepard), Isilda, Tatong, The Laurel Token, and several others. Some of her works were written using the pen name, "Cousin Annie".

== Book reviews ==
Izilda (Presbyterian Committee of Publication, Richmond, Virginia) was reviewed by the Woman's Foreign Missionary Society of the Methodist Episcopal Church, who stated that it is a story for girls, the scene of which is laid in São Paulo, Brazil, the centre of a flourishing Protestant mission. The customs and manners of the residents are placed on a background of the Romish religion. Set brightly against it is the happy Christian life of two Brazilian girls, who, by the simplicity of a life in Christ, win souls under the leadership of the American missionary. This book was especially adapted to young women's missionary societies. Woman's Foreign Missionary Society also reviewed Tatono, The Little Slave: A Story of Korea (Presbyterian Publication Committee, Richmond) stating, "The plot is good, the incidents well worked in, and the customs and manners of Korea so thoroughly a part of the story and the missionary element so entirely necessary to it, that the least interested in missions will read every paragraph for the story's sake, while the most interested will seize with eagerness so charming an opportunity to interest the uninterested in the Hermit Nation. The author betrays her southern breeding by occasional provincialisms. Nevertheless, this is the best Korean story we have ever seen."

== Personal life ==
Barnes resided in Summerville, South Carolina.

== Selected works ==
- 1887, Some lowly lives and the heights they reached
- 1890, Children of the Kalahari : a story of Africa
- 1891, Scenes in pioneer Methodism. Carefully edited and illustrated, vol. I.
- 1892, The house of grass
- 1892, Ninito a story of the Bible in Mexico
- 1893, The Gospel among the slaves : a short account of missionary operations among the African slaves of the southern states
- 1894, How A-chon-ho-ah found the light
- 1895, Matouchon: A Story of Indian Child Life
- 1896, Carmio : the little Mexican-Indian captive
- 1896, Izilda: a Story of Brazil
- 1897, The outstretched hand
- 1898, Chonita : a story of the Mexican mines
- 1899, Marti : a story of the Cuban war
- 1899, The Ferry Maid of the Chattahoochee: A Story for Girls
- 1899, Tatong, the little slave : a story of Korea
- 1899, Chief-justice Trott and the Carolina pirates
- 1900, The first chief justice of Carolina
- 1900, The little burden sharers
- 1901, Helps and entertainments for juvenile and young people's missionary societies
- 1903, The little lady of the fort
- 1903, Little Betty Blew : her strange experiences and adventures in Indian land
- 1903, The Red Miriok
- 1904, A Lass of Dorchester
- 1904, The laurel token: a story of the Yamassee uprising
- 1905, An American girl in Korea
- 1915, Mistress Moppet
- 1925, A little lady at the fall of Quebec
- 1925, The lost treasure of Umdilla
- 1927, A knight of Carolina
