= David Payne (novelist) =

American novelist

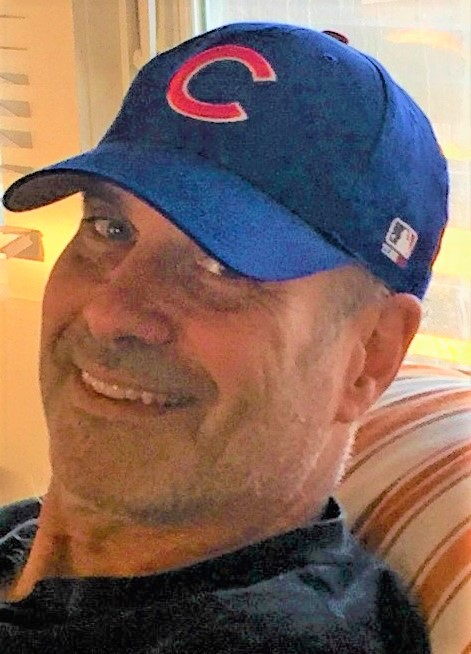
- Photo by the author
- Born: David Payne; April 13, 1955 (age 71); Chapel Hill, North Carolina
- Education: University of North Carolina at Chapel Hill
- Occupations: Novelist, essayist, creative writing teacher
- Writing career
- Genre: Literary fiction

David Payne is an American novelist and memoirist. He is the author of five novels and a memoir. His first novel won the Houghton Mifflin Literary Fellowship Award.

== Early career and education ==
Payne was born in Chapel Hill, North Carolina, and grew up in nearby Henderson, North Carolina. He attended the Phillips Exeter Academy and the University of North Carolina at Chapel Hill, graduating in 1977 with highest honors in creative writing. After college, he worked as a cabinetmaker and a commercial fisherman in Wanchese, North Carolina, and Point Judith, Rhode Island, prior to embarking on his first novel.

== Major publications ==
=== Confessions of a Taoist on Wall Street ===
Published by Houghton Mifflin in 1984, Confessions of a Taoist on Wall Street tells the story of an orphaned Taoist monk, Sun I—love child of a Chinese mother and a WWII American combat ace in China with the storied Flying Tigers. Sun I grows up in remote Sichuan Province and sets out for New York in search of his father, scion of a famous robber baron family, and of the "Tao within the Dow." Reviewing Payne's novel in The Washington Post Book World, Joseph McLellan wrote, "This novel, with its glorious style and rich profusion of detail, should remind readers of the time, fading into memory, when the works of John Barth began to burst on the literary horizon... absorbing and deeply rewarding." The critical and commercial success of his first novel allowed Payne to write full time.

=== Early from the Dance ===
Set on the North Carolina Outer Banks, Payne's second novel, Early from the Dance was published by Doubleday in 1989 and was again a Literary Guild selection. Reviewing for The Boston Globe, critic Richard Dyer called Payne, "a defining voice for this generation... Reading stretches of Early From the Dance is like attending a play in which every line is a curtain line. Payne has the deepest human sympathy for his characters and knowledge of the heart; everyone in this book comes alive."

=== Ruin Creek ===
Payne's third novel, Ruin Creek—set on the Outer Banks and in the fictional NC town of Killdeer—was published by Doubleday in 1993. The New York Times Book Review called Ruin Creek, "a powerful, lyrical novel that is a joy to read", and in The Dallas Morning News, Professor Sharnhorst of the U. of New Mexico, wrote: "I begin with what may seem a bold observation: David Payne is the most gifted American novelist of his generation. Not to put too fine a point on it, Ruin Creek is the best new novel I've read this year. As in "Early from the Dance," he sets his literary table on the Carolina Outer Banks, a literary territory as palpable in these pages as Tobacco Road in Erskine Caldwell's works or the Salinas Valley in John Steinbeck's."

=== Gravesend Light ===
In Payne's fourth novel, Gravesend Light, (Doubleday, 2000), Joey Madden—11-year-old narrator of Ruin Creek—has become Joe, an adult ethnographer, studying the lives of commercial fishermen in a traditional fishing community on the Outer Banks threatened with modernization. Reviewing for The Christian Science Monitor, Ron Charles wrote:

"... the grains of this plot eventually gain an irresistible momentum till it begins to move like an avalanche, crashing toward a spectacular natural disaster and a moral calamity. Joe's search for the magnetic field that orients people's lives and shapes their thoughts and actions finally takes him deep into that first, final, and most harrowing subject: himself. The novel reaches its climax in an explosively told disaster at sea that makes it clear there are no perfect storms. Payne is a rough, but trustworthy captain, and this is a story that rolls and pitches through all the moral waves of modern life."

=== Back to Wando Passo ===
Payne's fifth novel, Back to Wando Passo (William Morrow, 2006), is set on a former rice plantation in South Carolina, where the discovery of a black iron pot—buried upside down in an anthill and wrapped with chains— initiates a series of mysterious events, opening a time portal to a second plot set during the Civil War. Of the novel, author Pat Conroy wrote, "Back to Wando Passo quivers with authentic life and is so bold in concept and audacious in scope that it seems like the summing up and exclamation point of a great writer's career." Kirkus Reviews wrote, "Payne's plot is a fine twisty marvel, but what ultimately sells this epic is his outsized passion."

=== Barefoot to Avalon ===
In his sixth, most recent book, Barefoot to Avalon (Grove, 2015), Payne turned from fiction to memoir. The story centers on the death of Payne's younger brother, George A. Payne, detailing the last eight days of his life as he helped Payne pack up his Vermont house prior to returning to North Carolina. On the drive south, caravanning in two vehicles, Payne watched in the rearview mirror as his brother jackknifed, overturned and ultimately died on the shoulder of the highway. The New York Times called Barefoot to Avalon, "a brave book with beautiful sentences on every page", an appraisal seconded by The Los Angeles Times, which called Payne's memoir "a tour de force". In 2016, Charlie Rose interviewed Payne on The Charlie Rose Show, where he described Barefoot to Avalon as "powerful" and "searing".

== Biography ==
Payne has published in The New York Times, The Washington Post, the Paris daily, Libération, the Oxford American and elsewhere and has taught at Bennington College, Duke University and in the MFA Creative Writing Program at Queens University of Charlotte. Payne has two children. He and his partner, Kate Paisley Kennedy—Director of Gifted Education in the Chapel Hill-Carrboro Schools—live in Hillsborough, North Carolina.

== Works ==
- Confessions of a Taoist on Wall Street. Boston, Massachusetts: Houghton Mifflin. 1984. ISBN 978-0-395-35562-6. OCLC 10751312.
- Early from the Dance. New York: Doubleday. 1989. ISBN 978-0-385-26417-4. OCLC 19626773.
- Ruin Creek. New York: Doubleday. 1993. ISBN 978-0-385-26418-1. OCLC 27187403.
- Gravesend Light. New York: Doubleday. 2000. ISBN 978-0-385-52613-5. OCLC 43167979.
- Back to Wando Passo. New York: William Morrow. 2006. ISBN 9780060851903. OCLC 61262447.
- Barefoot to Avalon: A Brother's Story. New York: Atlantic Monthly Press. 2015. ISBN 978-0-8021-2354-1. OCLC 890615368.
