= List of writers of the Lost Generation =

This article contains a list of writers from a variety of national backgrounds who have been considered to be part of the Lost Generation. The Lost Generation includes people born between 1883 and 1900, and the term is generally applied to reference the work of these individuals during the 1920s.

== Writers described as members of the Lost Generation ==
- Gertrude Stein (Note: Despite being born in 1874, Stein was closely associated with the Lost Generation, and she is credited with coining the term Lost Generation.)
- F. Scott Fitzgerald
- T. S. Eliot
- Ezra Pound
- Sylvia Beach
- Ernest Hemingway
- Virgil Geddes
- Archibald MacLeish
- Hart Crane
- E. E. Cummings
- William Slater Brown
- Olaf Stapledon
- Sherwood Anderson
- John Dos Passos
- John Steinbeck
- Ford Madox Ford
- William Faulkner
- Thomas Wolfe
- Henri Barbusse
- Djuna Barnes
- Glenway Wescott
- Edna St. Vincent Millay
- Edmund Wilson
- Henry Miller
- Malcolm Cowley
- Louis-Ferdinand Céline
- Erich Maria Remarque
- Carl Zuckmayer
- Aldous Huxley
- James Joyce
- Virginia Woolf
- J. R. R. Tolkien
- Dashiell Hammett
- John Allan Wyeth
- C. S. Lewis
- Boris Pasternak

=== Killed during World War I ===
- Rupert Brooke
- Wilfred Owen
- Isaac Rosenberg
- Alan Seeger
- Edward Thomas
