= 1839 in literature =

This article contains information about the literary events and publications of 1839.

== Events ==
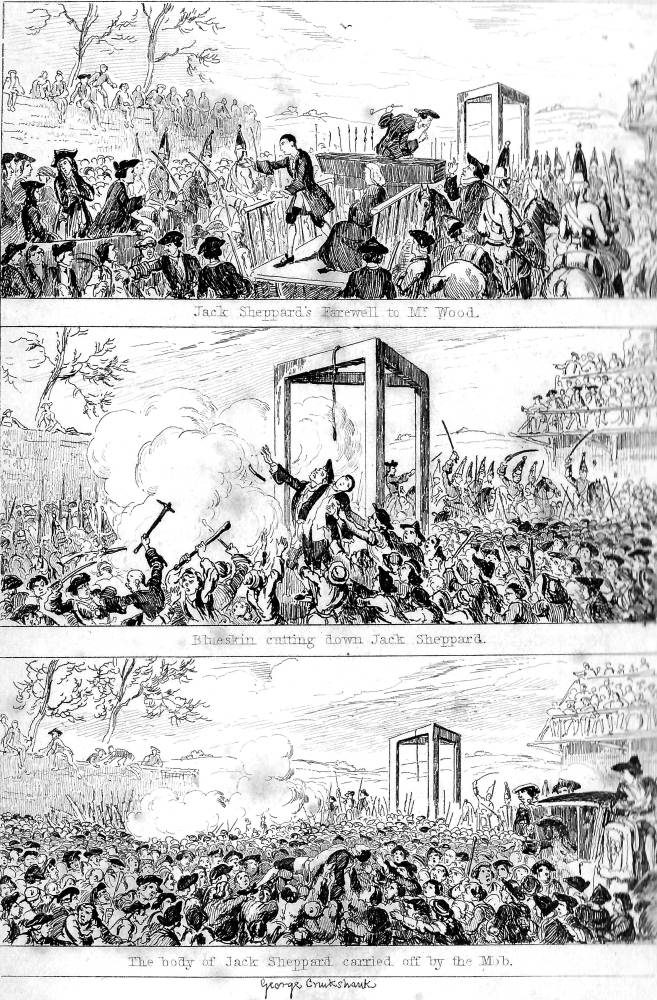
"The Last Scene", engraved by George Cruikshank in 1839 to illustrate William Harrison Ainsworth's serialised novel, Jack Sheppard. The caption reads: "Blueskin cutting down Jack Sheppard". In reality, Joseph "Blueskin" Blake was already dead by the time of Jack Sheppard's execution in 1724.

- January 21 – Åbo Svenska Teater in Åbo (Turku), Finland, opens with a performance of the Swedish-language play Gubben i Bergsbygden.
- March – W. Harrison Ainsworth takes over editorship of Bentley's Miscellany from Charles Dickens at the end of the year. Until April serializations of their respective novels Jack Sheppard and Oliver Twist have been running simultaneously in the magazine.
- April – Washington Irving begins contributing regularly to The Knickerbocker, and will publish thirty new pieces in the magazine through March 1841 — including "The Creole Village," where he coins the phrase "the almighty dollar".
- May 31 – An important British constitutional case of Stockdale v Hansard begins when publisher John Joseph Stockdale sues for libel after John Roberton's pseudo-medical work On Diseases of the Generative System (1811) is declared in a parliamentary report to be indecent.
- September – The first known London production of Love's Labour's Lost after Shakespeare's era opens at the Theatre Royal, Covent Garden, with Madame Vestris as Rosaline.
- unknown dates
  - Mikhail Lermontov publishes the first two parts of A Hero of Our Time (Герой нашего времени, Geroy nashevo vremeni) in Otechestvennye Zapiski. The novel comes to be seen as a pioneering classic of Russian psychological realism.
  - Sir Gawain and the Green Knight, a late 14th-century Middle English alliterative romance by the 'Pearl Poet', is first published complete in Syr Gawayne, a collection of early romance poems by Scottish and English authors relating to that knight of the Round Table, edited by Frederic Madden for the Bannatyne Club.
  - George Bell establishes the London publisher George Bell & Sons as an educational bookseller in Bouverie Street.

== New books ==
=== Fiction ===
- W. Harrison Ainsworth – Jack Sheppard
- Carl Jonas Love Almqvist – Det går an (It's Acceptable, translated as Sara Videbeck and the Chapel)
- Honoré de Balzac
  - Béatrix
  - Illusions perdues, II: Un Grand homme de province à Paris (Lost Illusions, II: A Distinguished Provincial in Paris)
  - Pierre Grassou
- Nicolaas Beets (as Hildebrand) – Camera Obscura
- Fredrika Bremer – Hemmet eller familje-sorger och fröjder
- Sarah Burney – The Romance of Private Life: The Renunciation and The Hermitage
- Charles Dickens – Nicholas Nickleby (serialization completed and in book form)
- Alexandre Dumas – Captain Pamphile
- Catherine Gore – The Cabinet Minister
- Maurits Hansen – Mordet paa Maskinbygger Roolfsen (The Murder of Engine-maker Roolfsen)
- Mikhail Lermontov - A Hero of Our Time (written)
- Frederick Marryat – Diary in America
- Harriet Martineau – Deerbrook
- Ellen Pickering
  - Nan Darrell, or The Gypsy Mother
  - The Fright
- Edgar Allan Poe
  - The Fall of the House of Usher
  - William Wilson
- George Sand
  - Pauline
  - Spiridion
- Jules Sandeau – Marianna
- Stendhal – The Charterhouse of Parma (La Chartreuse de Parme)
- Philip Meadows Taylor – Confessions of a Thug
- Cirilo Villaverde – Cecilia Valdés

=== Children and young people ===
- Catherine Sinclair – Holiday House: A Book for the Young
- Frederick Marryat – The Phantom Ship
- Hans Christian Andersen – Fairy Tales Told for Children. New Collection. Second Booklet (Eventyr, fortalte for Børn. Ny Samling. Andet Hefte) comprising "The Garden of Paradise" ("Paradisets have"), "The Flying Trunk" ("Den flyvende Kuffert") and "The Storks" ("Storkene")

=== Drama ===
- Edward Bulwer – Richelieu
- Felicia Hemans – De Chatillon
- James Sheridan Knowles – Love
- George Sand – Gabriel
- Juliusz Słowacki – Balladyna

=== Poetry ===
- Philip James Bailey (anonymous) – Festus
- Cláudio Manuel da Costa (posthumous) – Vila Rica
- Théodore Hersart de la Villemarqué (compiler) – Barzaz Breiz (Breton Ballads)
- Henry Wadsworth Longfellow – Voices of the Night

=== Non-fiction ===
- Louis Blanc – L'Organisation du travail
- Charles Darwin – The Voyage of the Beagle
- Mrs William Ellis – The Women of England: their social duties and domestic habits
- Michael Faraday – Experimental Researches in Electricity
- George W. M. Reynolds – Grace Darling; or, the Heroine of the Ferne Islands
- Jared Sparks – Life of Washington
- John Tallis – Tallis Directory

== Births ==
- January 7 – Ouida, English novelist (died 1908)
- January 26 – Mary Ann Maitland, Scottish-born Canadian author (died 1919)
- February 1 – James Herne, American dramatist (died 1901)
- February 22 – Francis Pharcellus Church, American editor and publisher (died 1906)
- March 9 – Františka Stránecká, Czech writer and collector of Moravian folklore (died 1888)
- March 16 – Sully Prudhomme, French poet and essayist, winner of the first Nobel Prize in Literature (died 1907)
- March 28 – Emily Lee Sherwood Ragan, American author and journalist (died 1918)
- April 18 – Henry Kendall, Australian poet (died 1882)
- June 21 – Joaquim Maria Machado de Assis, Brazilian poet and novelist (died 1908)
- June 22 – Clara Augusta Jones Trask, American dime novelist (died 1905)
- July 5 – Helen Stuart Campbell, American author, editor, and reformer (died 1918)
- July 11 – Kate Sanborn, American author and essayist (died 1917)
- July 21 – Emma Rood Tuttle, American author and poet (died 1916)
- August 4 – Walter Pater, English writer (died 1894)
- August 9 – Gaston Paris, French writer and scholar (died 1903)
- August 25 – Martha E. Cram Bates, American writer, journalist, and editor (died 1905)
- September 10 – Charles Sanders Peirce, American philosopher (died 1914)
- November 4 – S. M. I. Henry, American author, evangelist, and reformer (died 1900)
- November 16 – William De Morgan (sic), English novelist and potter (died 1917)
- November 29 – Ludwig Anzengruber, Austrian dramatist (died 1889)
- December 12 – Charlotte Frances Wilder, American writer (died 1916)
- December 23 – Lucinda Barbour Helm, American author, editor, and activist (died 1897)

== Deaths ==
- January 16 – Edmund Lodge, English biographer and writer on heraldry (born 1756)
- April 11 – John Galt, Scottish novelist and entrepreneur (born 1779)
- April 13 – Robert Millhouse, English weaver poet (born 1788)
- April 22 – Thomas Haynes Bayly, English poet, songwriter and dramatist (born 1797)
- May 9 – Joseph Fiévée, French journalist, novelist, essayist and playwright (born 1767)
- May 17 – Archibald Alison, Scottish author (born 1757)
- May 21 – José María Heredia y Campuzano, Cuban poet (born 1803)
- June 26 – Winifred Gales, English novelist and memoirist (born 1761)
- August 3 – Dorothea von Schlegel, German novelist and translator (born 1764)
- September 4 – Hermann Olshausen, German theologian (born 1796)
- September 28 – William Dunlap, American dramatist (born 1766)
- October 11 – Leonor de Almeida Portugal, 4th Marquise of Alorna, Portuguese noblewoman, painter, and poet (born 1750)
- October 22 – Alexander Odoevsky, Russian poet (born 1802)
- unknown dates
  - Elizabeth Dawbarn, English writer on religion and child care (year of birth not known)
  - Mary Pilkington, English novelist, poet and children's writer (born 1761)

== Awards ==
- Newdigate prize – John Ruskin
