= 1916 in literature =

This article contains information about the literary persons, events and publications of 1916.

== Events ==
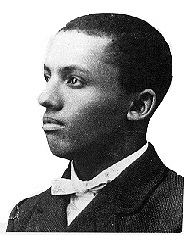
Carter G. Woodson, "father of African-American history" and founder of the The Journal of Negro History

- January
  - The Journal of Negro History is founded by Carter G. Woodson, father of "Black History" and "Negro History Week" in the United States.
  - Ryūnosuke Akutagawa's short story The Nose is published in a student magazine.
- March 1 – The National Library of Wales completes its transfer to purpose-built premises in Aberystwyth.
- March 22 – J. R. R. Tolkien and Edith Bratt marry at St Mary Immaculate Roman Catholic Church, Warwick, England. They will serve as inspiration for the fictional characters Beren and Lúthien. Tolkien leaves for military service in France at the beginning of June.
- March 30 – Don Marquis introduces the characters Archy and Mehitabel in "The Sun Dial" column in The Evening Sun (New York City). Archy is a poetry-writing cockroach unable to operate the typewriter shift key; Mehitabel is a cat.
- April–June – Katherine Mansfield and John Middleton Murry live as neighbours to D. H. and Frieda Lawrence at Higher Tregerthen, near Zennor in Cornwall (England).
- April 24–30 – In the Easter Rising in Ireland, members of the Irish Republican Brotherhood proclaim an Irish Republic and the Irish Volunteers and Irish Citizen Army occupy the General Post Office and other buildings in Dublin, before surrendering to the British Army. Of the seven subsequently executed leaders of the Rising, Thomas MacDonagh, Patrick Pearse and Joseph Plunkett are poets and James Connolly a balladeer and playwright. The events are the theme of W. B. Yeats' poem "Easter, 1916", first published this September.
- May 16 – Natsume Sōseki's novel Light and Darkness (明暗, Mei An) begins to be serialized in the Tokyo and Osaka editions of the newspaper Asahi Shimbun, but will remain unfinished at the author's death on December 9, aged 49.
- July 1
  - The poets W. N. Hodgson, Will Streets, Gilbert Waterhouse, Henry Field, Alfred Ratcliffe, Alexander Robertson and Bernard White are among 19,000 British soldiers killed on the First day on the Somme alone. The same day is chosen for the death of fictitious poet Cecil Valance in Alan Hollinghurst's 2011 novel The Stranger's Child. The Battle of the Somme continues until October 18, during which time American poet Alan Seeger (serving with the French), Irish writer Tom Kettle, English poet Edward Tennant, English short story writer Saki and English bowler Percy Jeeves (whose name P. G. Wodehouse borrowed for his character) are all killed. The English writer Robert Graves, novelist Stuart Cloete, playwright/actor Arnold Ridley and artist/poet David Jones are seriously injured – Graves is for a time believed killed. Ford Madox Hueffer suffers concussion and shell shock. A. A. Milne and J. R. R. Tolkien are invalided out. The English poet Siegfried Sassoon wins the Military Cross. The Cameron Highlander Dòmhnall Ruadh Chorùna composes the Scottish Gaelic love song An Eala Bhàn (The White Swan) in the oral literature tradition. The future U.K. Prime Minister Harold Macmillan is wounded in September's Battle of Flers–Courcelette; sheltering in a slit trench, he reads Aeschylus in the original Greek.
  - W. B. Yeats makes his fifth and final proposal of marriage to the newly widowed Maud Gonne in France.
- c. July–December – Poets Terence MacSwiney and Darrell Figgis are among Irish republicans detained in Reading Gaol (England) following the Easter Rising.
- Summer – In the United States, 15-year-old Margaret Mitchell writes a novella called Lost Laysen in two notebooks. She will later give the manuscript to a boyfriend and the book remains lost until the mid-1990s. It is published in 1996. Meanwhile, Mitchell will go on to write Gone with the Wind.
- September – Joseph Conrad's novella The Shadow-Line begins to be serialized in The English Review (London) and the Metropolitan Magazine (New York).
- October 6 – The poet Perpessicius loses his right arm fighting for the Romanians in a skirmish at Muratan.
- October 19 – New premises for the German National Library open in Leipzig.
- December – The first of many editions of Robert Baden-Powell's The Wolf Cub's Handbook is published.
- December 29 – James Joyce's semi-autobiographical novel A Portrait of the Artist as a Young Man is first published complete in book form, in New York by B. W. Huebsch.

== New books ==
=== Fiction ===
- Sholem Aleichem – In America (אין אַמעריקע, In amerike), second part of Motl, Peysi the Cantor's Son: The Writings of an Orphan Boy (מאָטל פּייסי דעם חזנס; כתבֿים פֿון אַ ייִנגל אַ יתום, Motl peysi dem khazns: ksovim fun a yingl a yosem)
- Sherwood Anderson – Windy McPherson's Son
- Ruby M. Ayres
  - The Road That Bends
  - Paper Roses
  - A Man of His Word
  - The Year After
- Henri Barbusse – Under Fire (Le Feu)
- Arnold Bennett – These Twain
- E. F. Benson
  - David Blaize
  - Mike
  - The Freaks of Mayfair
- Adrien Bertrand – L'Appel du sol
- John Edward Bruce – The Awakening of Hezekiah Jones
- Mary Grant Bruce – Captain Jim
- Thomas Burke – Limehouse Nights (including "Beryl and the Croucher", "The Chink and the Child" and "Gina of the Chinatown")
- Gilbert Cannan – Mendel: a story of youth
- Ethel M. Dell – The Bars of Iron
- Alfred Döblin – The Three Leaps of Wang Lun (Die drei Sprünge des Wang-lun, dated 1915)
- Ronald Firbank – Inclinations
- Walter Flex – Der Wanderer zwischen beiden Welten (The Wanderer between Two Worlds)
- Charlotte Perkins Gilman – With Her in Ourland
- Elinor Glyn – The Career of Katherine Bush
- Sarah Grand – The Winged Victory
- Louis Hémon – Maria Chapdelaine
- Hermann Hesse – Schön ist die Jugend
- William Dean Howells – The Leatherwood God
- James Joyce – A Portrait of the Artist as a Young Man
- Franz Kafka – The Metamorphosis (Die Verwandlung, first book publication)
- Frigyes Karinthy
  - Please, Sir! (Tanár úr, kérem)
  - Voyage to Faremido (Utazás Faremidóba)
- Grace King – The Pleasant Ways of St. Medard
- Ring Lardner – You Know Me Al
- Gaston Leroux – Chéri-Bibi and Cécily
- Ada Leverson – Love At Second Sight
- Benito Lynch – The Caranchos of Florida
- I. I. Mironescu – Sandu Hurmuzel (short stories)
- George Moore – The Brook Kerith: A Syrian Story
- Mori Ōgai – Takasebune (高瀬舟 The Boat on the Takase River)
- Baroness Orczy – Leatherface
- Henrik Pontoppidan – De dødes Rige (The Realm of the Dead; publication concludes)
- Dorothy Richardson – Backwater
- Berta Ruck – In Another Girl's Shoes
- Ruth Sawyer – Seven Miles to Arden
- May Sinclair – Tasker Jevons
- Rabindranath Tagore – The Home and the World (ঘরে বাইরে, Ghôre Baire)
- Booth Tarkington – Seventeen: A Tale of Youth and Summer Time and the Baxter Family Especially William
- Mark Twain – The Mysterious Stranger (completed posthumously)
- Eduard Vilde – Mäeküla piimamees (The Milkman of Mäeküla)
- Edgar Wallace
  - A Debt Discharged
  - The Tomb of Ts'in
- Mrs Humphry Ward – Lady Connie
- Mary Webb – The Golden Arrow
- H. G. Wells – Mr. Britling Sees It Through
- Francis Brett Young – The Iron Age

=== Children and young people ===
- L. Frank Baum
  - Rinkitink in Oz
  - Mary Louise (as Edith Van Dyne)
- Frances Hodgson Burnett - The Little Hunchback Zia
- Edgar Rice Burroughs – The Beasts of Tarzan
- Dorothy Canfield Fisher – Understood Betsy
- May Gibbs – Gumnut Babies

=== Drama ===
- Jacinto Benavente – Campo de armiño (Ermine Field)
- Hall Caine
  - The Prime Minister
  - The Iron Hand (also known as The Call of the King)
- Luigi Chiarelli – La maschera e il volto: grottesco in tre atti (The Mask and the Face)
- Ernest Fenollosa and Ezra Pound (translated & edited) – Certain Noble Plays of Japan (published)
- Susan Glaspell – Trifles
- Harley Granville-Barker – Farewell to the Theatre
- Sacha Guitry – Let's Make a Dream
- Walter Hackett - The Barton Mystery
- Franz Kafka – The Warden of the Tomb (Der Gruftwächter; writing commenced)
- Jack London – The Acorn Planter: A California Forest Play
- André de Lorde – Le Laboratoire des hallucinations
- Gregorio Martínez Sierra – El reino de Dios (The Kingdom of God)
- Allan Monkhouse – Night Watches: a comedy in one act
- Eden Phillpotts – The Farmer's Wife
- Sophie Treadwell – Claws
- W. B. Yeats – At the Hawk's Well (private performance)

=== Poetry ===
- Pauline B. Barrington — "Education"
- Robert Frost – Mountain Interval
- Yvan Goll – Requiem pour les morts de l'Europe
- Joseph Lee – Ballads of Battle
- Amy Lowell – Men, Women, and Ghosts
- Antonio Machado – Campos de Castilla (revised edition)
- Charlotte Mew – The Farmer's Bride
- Ezra Pound – Lustra
- Carl Sandburg – Chicago Poems
- Muriel Stuart – Christ at Carnival and Other Poems
- Katharine Tynan – Holy War
- Gilbert Waterhouse – Rail-Head and other poems (published posthumously)
- W. B. Yeats – "Easter, 1916" (written)
- Sergei Yesenin – Радуница (Radunitsa, Ritual for the Dead)

=== Non-fiction ===
- Max Aitken – Canada in Flanders
- Hall Caine – Our Girls: Their Work for the War
- Max Dvořák – Katechismus der Denkmalpflege (Catechism of Historical Preservation)
- Ferdinand de Saussure (posthumous) – Cours de linguistique générale
- Albert Einstein – "Die Grundlage der allgemeinen Relativitätstheorie" (The Groundwork of General Relativity), Annalen der Physik 49
- Ernest Fenollosa and Ezra Pound – Noh, or, Accomplishment: A Study of the Classical Stage of Japan
- Israel Gollancz (ed.) – A Book of Homage to Shakespeare
- Madison Grant – The Passing of the Great Race; or, The Racial Basis of European History
- Ellen La Motte – The Backwash of War
- Sydney Loch (as Sydney De Loghe) – The Straits Impregnable (military autobiography; 1st edition, published as fiction)
- Sir Oliver Lodge – Raymond; or, Life and Death, with Evidence for Survival of Memory and Affection after Death
- Ezra Pound – Gaudier-Brzeska: A Memoir
- George Barbu Știrbei – Feuilles d'automne et feuilles d'hiver (Autumn Leaves and Winter Leaves)
- Mrs Humphry Ward – England's Effort: Six Letters to an American Friend
- Frances Garnet Wolseley, 2nd Viscountess Wolseley – Women on the Land

== Births ==
- January 10 – Bernard Binlin Dadié, Ivorien author and politician (died 2019)
- February 15 – Ian Ballantine, American publisher (died 1995)
- March 4
  - Giorgio Bassani, Italian author (died 2000)
  - Hans Eysenck, German-born England-based psychologist (died 1997)
- March 24 – Donald Hamilton, Swedish-born American writer (died 2000)
- April 12 – Beverly Cleary, American children's author (died 2021)
- April 15 – Helene Hanff, American writer and critic (died 1997)
- April 29 – Ramón Amaya Amador, Honduran author (died 1966)
- May 11 – Camilo José Cela, Spanish novelist and Nobel laureate (died 2002)
- May 12 – Albert Murray, American critic, novelist and biographer (died 2013)
- May 17 – Lenka Reinerová, Czech writer (died 2008)
- May 21 – Harold Robbins, American novelist (died 1997)
- May 28 – Walker Percy, American novelist (died 1990)
- June 9 – Jurij Brězan, German/Sorbian writer (died 2006)
- June 16 – Barbara Skelton, English fiction writer, memoirist and literary figure (died 1996)
- July 14 – Natalia Ginzburg, Italian author (died 1991)
- July 24 – John D. MacDonald, American novelist and short story writer (died 1986)
- August 28
  - C. Wright Mills, American sociologist (died 1962)
  - Jack Vance, American mystery, fantasy, and science fiction writer (died 2013)
- September 13 – Roald Dahl, Welsh-born children's author (died 1990)
- September 14 – Eric Bentley, English-born American drama critic (died 2020)
- September 17 – Mary Stewart (Mary Rainbow), English romantic suspense novelist (died 2014)
- September 19 – Giles Romilly, English journalist (died 1967)
- September 25 – Jessica Anderson, Australian novelist and short story writer (died 2010)
- September 27 – S. Yizhar (Yizhar Smilansky), Israeli author (died 2006)
- October 3 – James Herriot (James Alfred Wight), English writer and veterinary surgeon (died 1995)
- October 10 – David Gascoyne, English Surrealist poet (died 2001)
- October 11 – Ahmad Abd al-Ghafur Attar, Saudi Arabian writer, journalist and poet (died 1991)
- October 12 – Alice Childress, African American playwright, actress and novelist (died 1994)
- November 7 – Ian Niall (John Kincaid McNeillie), Scottish novelist and non-fiction writer (died 2002)
- November 16 – Hélène Guisan-Démétriadès, Swiss Vaud writer, poet and teacher
- November 18 – Peter Weiss, German writer, painter and filmmaker (died 1982)
- November 24 – James Pope-Hennessy, English biographer and travel writer (murdered 1974)
- December 14 – Shirley Jackson, American novelist and short story writer (died 1965)
- December 17 – Penelope Fitzgerald (Penelope Knox), English novelist (died 2000)
- December 30 – Lili Berger, Yiddish writer, antifascist militant and literary critic (died 1996)

== Deaths ==
- January 27 – C. Morton Horne, Irish writer and performer (killed in action, born 1885)
- February 6 – Rubén Darío, Nicaraguan poet (born 1867)
- February 12 – John Townsend Trowbridge, American author (born 1827)
- February 28 – Henry James, American-born novelist (born 1843)
- April 19 – Emily Lee Sherwood Ragan, American author and journalist (born 1839)
- April 26 – Mário de Sá-Carneiro, Portuguese novelist and poet (suicide, born 1890)
- May 3 – Patrick Pearse, poet and Irish nationalist leader (executed, born 1879)
- May 13 – Sholem Aleichem, Ukrainian-born humorist (born 1859)
- May 25 – Jane Dieulafoy, French archaeologist and novelist (born 1851)
- May 28 (May 15 O.S.) – Ivan Franko, Ukrainian writer, translator and political activist (born 1856)
- May 31 – Gorch Fock (Johann Wilhelm Kinau), German poet and novelist (killed in action, born 1880)
- June 4 – Emma Rood Tuttle, American writer and poet (born 1839)
- June 7 – Émile Faguet, French critic (born 1847)
- June 30 – Eunice Gibbs Allyn, American correspondent, author, songwriter (born 1847)
- July 1
  - W. N. Hodgson (Edward Melbourne), English war poet (killed in action, born 1893)
  - Gilbert Waterhouse, English architect and war poet (killed in action, born 1883)
- August 8 – Lily Braun (Amalie von Kretschmann), German feminist writer (born 1865)
- August 27 – Petar Kočić, Bosnian novelist and politician (born 1877)
- September 7 – Annie Le Porte Diggs, Canadian-born American activist, journalist, author (born 1853)
- September 22 – Edward Tennant, English war poet (killed in action, born 1897)
- October 7 – James Whitcomb Riley, American poet (born 1849)
- October 21 – Olindo Guerrini, Italian poet (born 1845)
- October 25 – John Todhunter, Irish poet and dramatist (born 1839)
- November 14 – Saki (H. H. Munro), English short-story writer (killed in action, born 1870)
- November 15 – Molly Elliot Seawell, American novelist (born 1860)
- November 20 – Lucie Fulton Isaacs, American writer, philanthropist, suffragist (born 1841)
- November 22 – Jack London, American novelist (born 1876)
- November 27 – Émile Verhaeren, Belgian Symbolist poet (born 1855)
- December 9 – Natsume Sōseki, Japanese novelist (born 1867)

== Awards ==
- Nobel Prize in Literature: Carl Gustaf Verner von Heidenstam (Swedish)

== See also ==
- World War I in literature
