= 1841 in literature =

This article contains information about the literary events and publications of 1841.

== Events ==
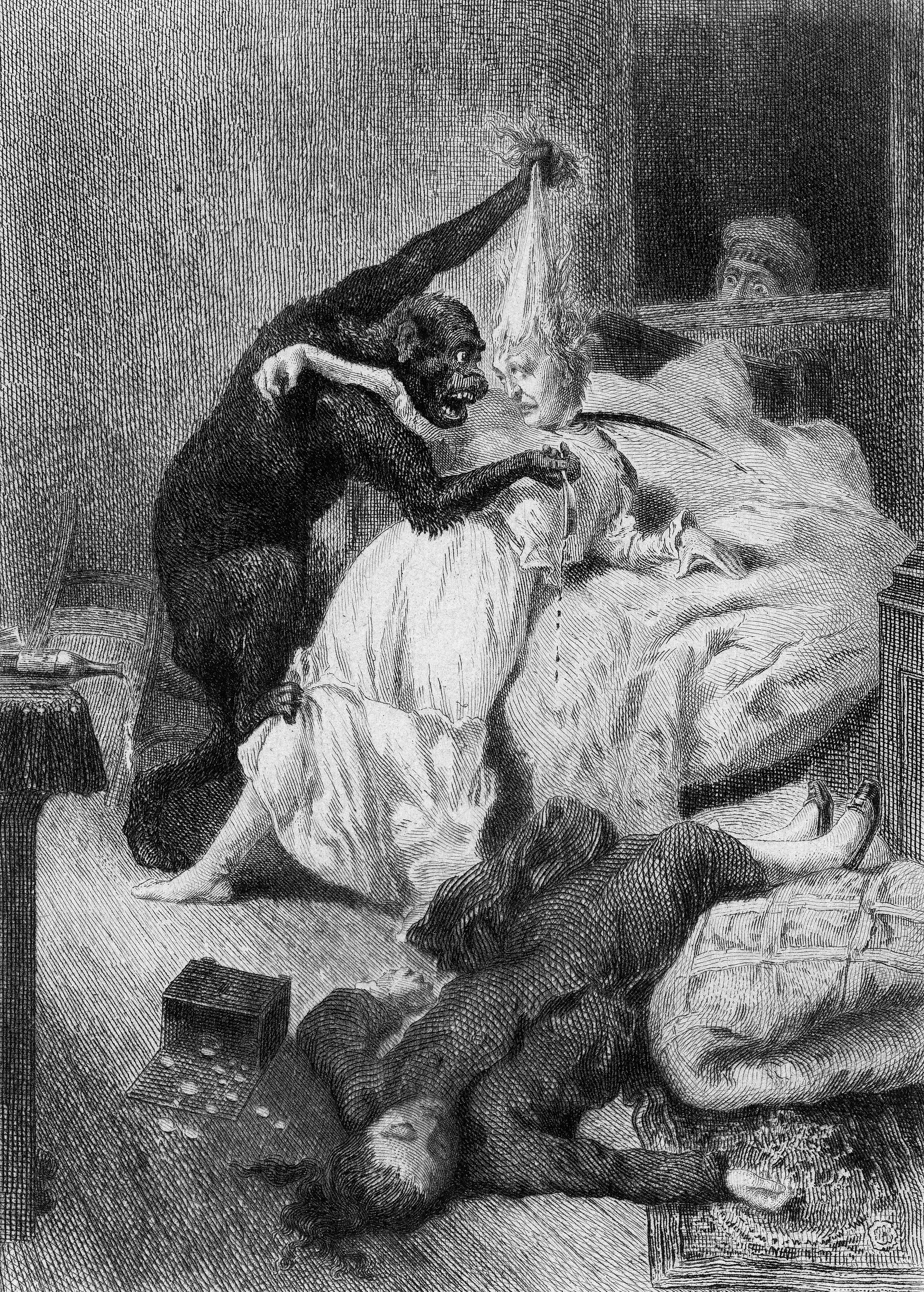
Illustration by Daniel Vierge of "The Murders in the Rue Morgue", 1870

- January – The poet Elizabeth Barrett Browning is given a golden Cocker Spaniel, "Flush", by the writer Mary Russell Mitford.
- March 4 – Dion Boucicault's first London première, the comedy London Assurance (originally Out of Town), opens at the Theatre Royal, Covent Garden. It is presented by the husband-and-wife team Charles Matthews and Elizabeth Vestris.
- April 10 – Horace Greeley begins publication of the New-York Tribune.
- April 20 – Edgar Allan Poe's short story "The Murders in the Rue Morgue" appears in Graham's Magazine (Philadelphia), where he has become editor in February. It will be recognized as the first significant work of detective fiction.
- May – The London Library is founded in Pall Mall, London on the initiative of Thomas Carlyle.
- June 23 – London publisher Edward Moxon is tried and convicted of blasphemous libel for an edition of Shelley's poem Queen Mab (1813) with its atheistic passages restored.
- July 17 – Punch magazine, founded in London by Henry Mayhew and engraver Ebenezer Landells, is edited by Mayhew and Mark Lemon.
- July 20 – The English "peasant poet" John Clare absconds from an asylum for the insane at High Beach in Essex and walks 90 miles (140 km) to his home at Northborough in the East Midlands. In late December he is admitted to Northampton General Lunatic Asylum where he will spend the remaining 23 years of his life.
- July 28 – Mary Rogers, the "Beautiful Cigar Girl", is found murdered in New York City. This will inspire Edgar Allan Poe's story "The Mystery of Marie Rogêt" of the following year, as a sequel to "The Murders in the Rue Morgue".
- unknown dates
  - Anthony Panizzi and his staff at the British Museum Library in London devise "Ninety-One Cataloguing Rules".
  - Tauchnitz publishers of Leipzig begin their Collection of British and American Authors with Dickens' The Pickwick Papers and Bulwer-Lytton's Pelham. This authorized series of cheap reprints will become popular with Anglophone travelers in continental Europe.

== New books ==
=== Fiction ===
- Khachatur Abovian (posthumous) – Wounds of Armenia (Armenian: Վերք Հայաստանի Verk Hayastani; first Armenian novel)
- W. Harrison Ainsworth – Old St. Paul's (serialized)
- Peter Christen Asbjørnsen and Jørgen Moe (collected anonymously) – Norwegian Folktales (Norske folkeeventyr)
- Gertrudis Gomez de Avellaneda – Sab
- Honoré de Balzac – Le Curé de village
- Edward Bulwer – Night and Morning
- James Fenimore Cooper – The Deerslayer
- Catherine Crowe – The Adventures of Susan Hopley
- Charles Dickens
  - Master Humphrey's Clock (serialization including full-length novels)
  - The Old Curiosity Shop
  - Barnaby Rudge: A Tale of the Riots of 'Eighty
- Catherine Gore
  - Greville, or a Season in Paris
  - Cecil, or Adventures of a Coxcomb
  - Cecil, A Peer
- Jeremias Gotthelf – Uli der Knecht (Uli the Farmhand)
- James Justinian Morier – The Mirza
- Theodor Mundt – Thomas Münzer
- Edgar Allan Poe – short stories
  - "The Murders in the Rue Morgue"
  - "A Descent into the Maelström"
  - "Eleonora"
  - "Never Bet the Devil Your Head"
  - "Three Sundays in a Week"
- Eugène Sue – Mathilde
- A. K. Tolstoy – The Vampire («Упырь», Oupyr, novella)
- Charlotte Elizabeth Tonna
  - Conformity
  - Falsehood and Truth
  - Helen Fleetwood: Tales of the Factories
- Samuel Warren – Ten Thousand a Year

=== Children ===
- Frederick Marryat
  - Joseph Rushbrook, or The Poacher
  - Masterman Ready, or the Wreck of the Pacific
- Agnes Strickland – Alda, the British Captive
- Hans Christian Andersen – Fairy Tales Told for Children. New Collection. Third Booklet (Eventyr, fortalte for Børn. Ny Samling. Tredie Hefte) comprising "Ole Lukoie" ("Ole Lukøje"), "The Rose Elf" ("Rosen-Alfen"), "The Swineherd" ("Svinedrengen") and "The Buckwheat" ("Boghveden")

=== Drama ===
- Dion Boucicault – London Assurance
- Robert Browning – Pippa Passes
- James Sheridan Knowles – Old Maids
- Mary Russell Mitford – Inez de Castro
- George Dibdin Pitt (adapted from Catherine Crowe) – Susan Hopley; or, The Vicissitudes of a Servant Girl
- Jules-Édouard Alboize de Pujol – Le Tribut des cent vierges
- Juliusz Słowacki – Fantazy (published posthumously in 1866)
- John Watkins – John Frost: a Chartist play

=== Poetry ===
- Mikhail Lermontov – The Demon: An Eastern Tale
- Henry Wadsworth Longfellow – Excelsior
- James Russell Lowell – A Year's Life
- Alexander Pushkin – The Bronze Horseman

=== Non-fiction ===
- George Borrow – The Zincali; or an Account of the Gypsies of Spain
- Thomas Carlyle – On Heroes, Hero-Worship, and The Heroic in History
- Ralph Waldo Emerson – Essays
- Ludwig Feuerbach – Das Wesen des Christentums (The Essence of Christianity)
- Washington Irving – Biography and Poetical Remains of the Late Margaret Miller Davidson
- Søren Kierkegaard – On the Concept of Irony with Continual Reference to Socrates
- Edgar Allan Poe – "A Few Words on Secret Writing"
- Augustus Pugin – The True Principles of Pointed or Christian Architecture

== Births ==
- January 15 – Sarah Doudney, English novelist, hymnist and children's writer (died 1926)
- January 18 – Lucie Fulton Isaacs, American writer, philanthropist, suffragist (died 1916)
- February 28 – Jean Mounet-Sully, French actor (died 1904)
- March 21 – Mathilde Blind, German-born English poet (died 1896)
- March 31 – Iosif Vulcan, Romanian poet, playwright and novelist (died 1907)
- April 6 – Ivan Surikov, Russian poet (died 1898)
- April 18 – Georges de Peyrebrune (Mathilde-Marie Georgina Élisabeth Johnston of Pierrebrune), French novelist (died 1917)
- April 30 – Laura Jacinta Rittenhouse, American author and poet (died 1911)
- May 20 – Sara Louisa Oberholtzer, American poet and economist (died 1930)
- May 22 – Catulle Mendès, French poet (died 1909)
- June 19 – Hermann Eduard von Holst, German historian (died 1904)
- June 21 – Charitie Lees Smith, American hymnwriter (died 1923)
- July 4 – Susan Marr Spalding, American poet (died 1908)
- July 27 – Harriette A. Keyser, American author, industrial reformer (died 1936)
- August 3 – Juliana Horatia Ewing, English children's writer (died 1885)
- August 4 – William Henry Hudson, Argentinian-born English writer and naturalist (died 1922)
- August 18 – Robert Williams Buchanan, Scottish author (died 1901)
- September 20 – Walter Bradford Woodgate, English boating writer and oarsman (died 1920)
- September 24 – Kate Brownlee Sherwood, American poet, journalist, and translator (died 1914)
- September 27 – Aubertine Woodward Moore, American musician and writer (died 1929)
- October 6 – Clement Scott, English critic and travel writer (died 1916)
- November 3 – Isabella Macdonald Alden, American author (died 1930)
- November 8 – John Charles Dent, English-born Canadian journalist and historian (died 1888)
- November 13 – William Black, Scottish novelist (died 1898)
- December 29 – Henrietta A. Bingham, American writer and editor (died 1877)
- unknown dates
  - Annie Somers Gilchrist (1841-1912), American author (died 1912)
  - Emily Pitts Stevens, American editor, publisher, educator, and activist (died 1906)
  - Emily Elizabeth Veeder, American novelist and poet (died after 1896)
- probable – Liu Qingyun (闹元宵), Chinese playwright and poet (died 1900 or later)

== Deaths ==
Dorothea Tieck

- January 12 – Märta Helena Reenstierna, Swedish diarist (born 1753)
- February 21 – Dorothea Tieck, German translator (born 1799)
- April 8 – James Browne, Scottish man of letters (born 1793)
- April 16 – Frederick Reynolds, English playwright (born 1764)
- May 7 – Thomas Barnes, English editor of The Times (born 1785)
- May 20 – Joseph Blanco White, Spanish-born English poet and theologian (born 1775)
- July 27 – Mikhail Lermontov, Russian poet (duel, born 1814)
- August 11 – Johann Friedrich Herbart, German philosopher (born 1776)
- September 16 – Thomas John Dibdin, English playwright (born 1771)
- October 31 – Georg Anton Friedrich Ast, German philologist and philosopher (born 1778)
- December 12 – Denis-Luc Frayssinous, French theologian and bishop (born 1765)
