= Gertrudis Gómez de Avellaneda =

Cuban-born Spanish writer

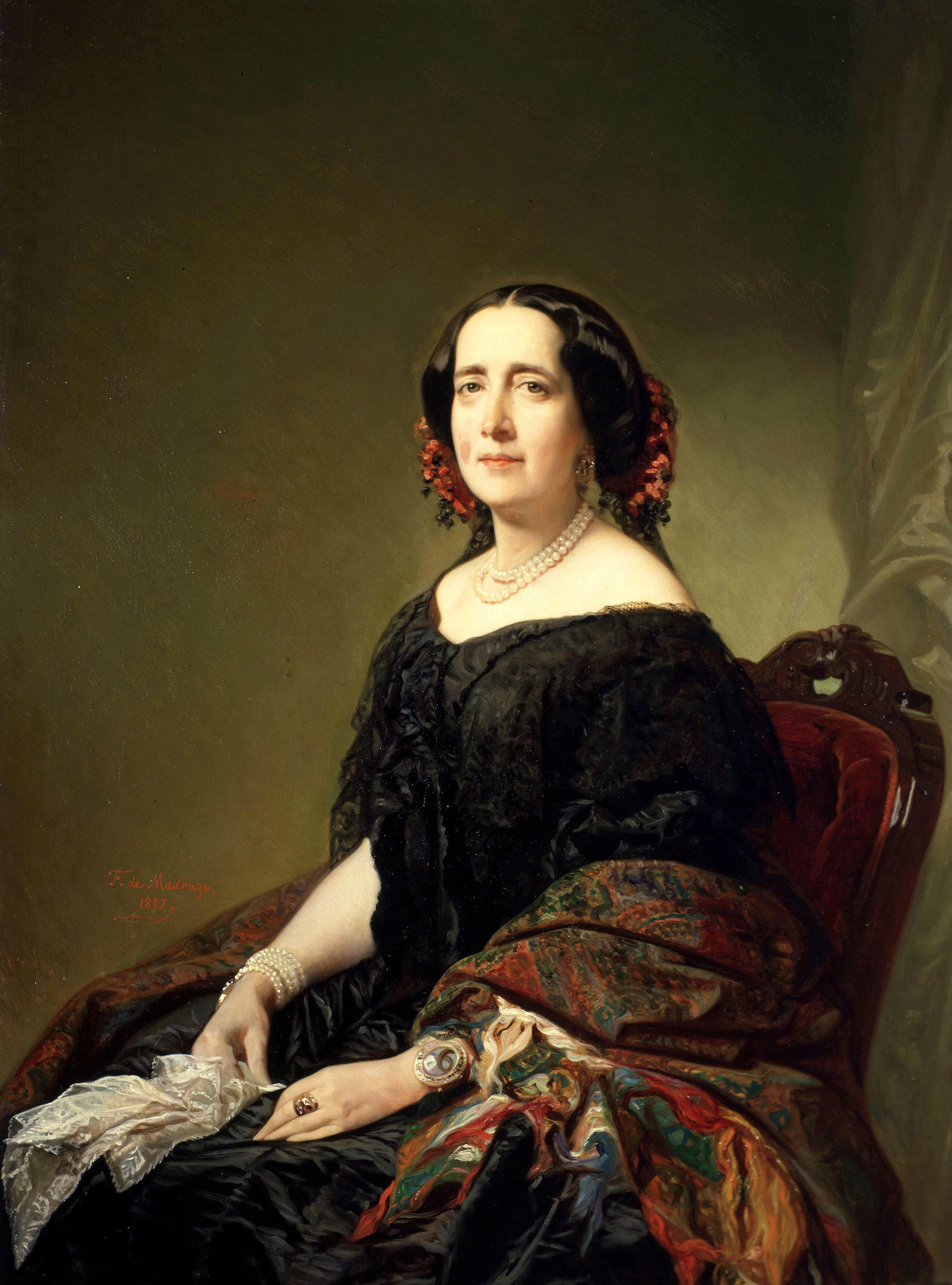
- Gertrudis Gómez de Avellaneda by Federico Madrazo, 1857
- Born: María Gertrudis de los Dolores Gómez de Avellaneda y Arteaga; March 23, 1814; Puerto Príncipe (modern day Camagüey), Cuba
- Died: February 1, 1873 (aged 58); Madrid, Spain
- Occupations: writer, poet, novelist, playwright
- Spouse(s): Pedro Sabater, Domingo Verdugo y Massieu
- Partner(s): Ignacio de Cepeda y Alcalde, Gabriel García Tassara
- Writing career
- Pen name: La Peregrina
- Language: Spanish
- Genre: Romanticism
- Notable work: Sab (novel)

Gertrudis Gómez de Avellaneda y Arteaga (March 23, 1814 – February 1, 1873) was a 19th-century Cuban-born Spanish writer. Born in Puerto Príncipe, now Camagüey, she lived in Cuba until she was 22. Her family moved to Spain in 1836, where she started writing as La Peregrina (The Pilgrim) and lived there until 1859, when she moved back to Cuba with her second husband until his death in 1863, after which she moved back to Spain. She died in Madrid in 1873 from diabetes at the age of 58.

She was a prolific writer and wrote 20 plays and numerous poems. Her most famous work, however, is the antislavery novel Sab, published in Madrid in 1841. The eponymous protagonist is a slave who is deeply in love with his mistress Carlota, who is entirely oblivious to his feelings for her.

== Life ==
=== Early life ===
María Gertrudis de los Dolores Gómez de Avellaneda y Arteaga was born on March 23, 1814, in Santa María de Puerto Príncipe, which was often referred to simply as Puerto Príncipe and which is now known as Camagüey. Puerto Príncipe was a provincial capital in central Cuba in Avellaneda's day, and Cuba was a region of Spain. Her father, Manuel Gómez de Avellaneda y Gil de Taboada, had arrived in Cuba in 1809 and was a Spanish naval officer in charge of the port of Nuevitas. Her mother, Francisca María del Rosario de Arteaga y Betancourt, was a criolla (Note: In Spanish the term "Creole" (criollo/criolla) refers to a person of Spanish ancestry who was born in the New World; it does not imply that a person is of mixed European and black descent, as it does in English.) with ancestry from the Basque Country and the Canary Islands, member of the wealthy Arteaga y Betancourt family, which was one of the most prominent and important families in Puerto Príncipe. Avellaneda was the first of five children from her parents' marriage, but only she and her younger brother Manuel survived childhood.

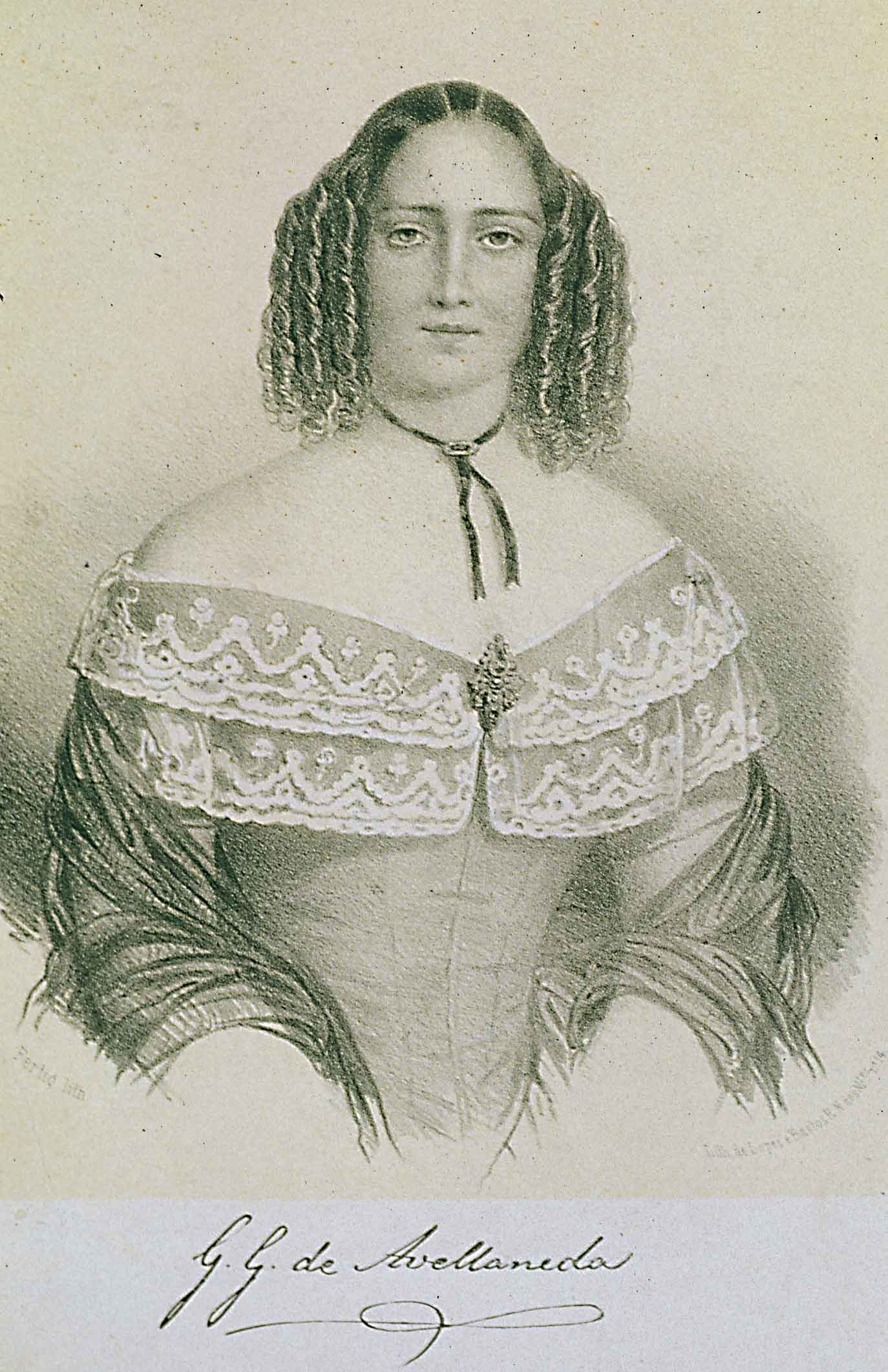
Woodcut of Gertrudis Gómez de Avellaneda

Her father died in 1823 when she was nine years old, and her mother remarried ten months later to Gaspar Isidoro de Escalada y López de la Peña, who was a Spanish lieutenant colonel posted in Puerto Príncipe. Avellaneda strongly disliked him and thought that he was too strict; she was glad whenever he was stationed away from home. From the time her mother remarried until the time she left Cuba for Spain, Avellaneda only saw her stepfather two or three months a year. She had two older half-siblings from her father's first marriage named Manuel and Gertrudis, a younger brother also named Manuel, and three younger half-siblings from her mother's marriage to Escalada: Felipe, Josefa, and Emilio. Little is known about Avellaneda's relationship with her older half-siblings, (Note: She never mentioned her older half-siblings in her memoirs.) except that they lived somewhere else. Her younger brother Manuel was her favorite, and she was in charge of her three younger half-siblings.

When she was 13 years old she was betrothed to a distant relative who was one of the wealthiest men in Puerto Príncipe. Her maternal grandfather promised her a fifth of his estate if she went through with this marriage, which he had arranged himself. At the age of 15 she broke off that engagement against her family's wishes, and as a result she was left out of her grandfather's will. (Her grandfather died in 1832, when she was 17 or 18.) It is thought that this traumatic experience fueled her hatred of arranged marriages and patriarchal authority and her belief that married women were essentially slaves. Her aversion to marriage was also due to the unhappy marriage of her cousin Angelita, who was her only friend after she refused to marry the man her family had chosen for her.

Avellaneda was, by her own admission, a spoiled child, as her family's slaves did all the chores. She had a lot of free time, which she used to read voraciously. One of her tutors was the Cuban poet José María Heredia.

=== Move to Spain ===
By 1836 Escalada had become concerned enough about the possibility of a slave rebellion that he persuaded his wife to sell off her property and slaves and move the family from Cuba to Spain. Avellaneda, now 22, supported the idea because she wanted to meet her father's relatives in Andalusia. The family set sail for Europe on April 9, 1836, and arrived in Bordeaux, France two months later. They spent 18 days there before sailing to A Coruña in Galicia, Spain. They stayed in A Coruña with Escalada's family for two years. Avellaneda was invited into some distinguished social circles in Galicia and in 1837 was engaged to Francisco Ricafort, son of Mariano Ricafort, the Captain-General of Galicia at the time. She did not marry him, however, as she had decided not to marry until she was economically independent, and her stepfather withheld her inheritance. When Francisco was sent to fight in the Carlist Wars, she left Galicia to go to Seville with her younger brother Manuel; she would never see him again. She was glad to leave Galicia, as she was criticized by Galician women for her refusal to do manual labor and for her love of study. She also disliked the damp climate and lack of cultural life.

In the province of Seville in Andalusia she visited Constantina, where her father's family lived. In 1839, shortly after her arrival in Seville, she met and fell deeply in love with Ignacio de Cepeda y Alcalde, a wealthy, well-educated, and socially prominent young man, who was the focus of many of her writings, mainly love letters. (There were forty love letters total, spanning from 1839 until 1854. After his death, his widow inherited and published them.) She also wrote him an autobiography in July 1839. Biographers of Avellaneda have relied too heavily on this account for information about her early life, as it was written for a specific purpose: to make a good impression on Cepeda. For example, she said that she was younger than she really was because Cepeda was two years younger than her, and she wanted to make herself look as young as possible. (Note: Avellaneda consistently shaved a few years off her real age in her autobiographical writings, perhaps because of personal vanity, and perhaps because she generally had romantic relationships with men who were slightly younger than her.) Because of the over-reliance on this biased source, few details are known for certain about the first 22 years of her life. The autobiography written to Cepeda was the second of the four autobiographies she wrote during her lifetime; the other three were written in 1838, 1846, and 1850, respectively. Though she loved Cepeda very much, he did not want to pursue a marriage with her. One reason he gave was that she was not rich enough. He also gave as a reason that she was not feminine enough, stating that she was more talkative than should be and was often too aggressive for a woman of the 19th century. After her relationship with Cepeda ended, she went to Madrid.

In Madrid she had a number of tumultuous love affairs, some with prominent writers associated with Spanish Romanticism. Her affairs included several engagements to different men. There she met and had an affair with Gabriel Garcia Tassara. He was also a poet from Seville. In 1844, she had a daughter out of wedlock with Tassara. Soon after the baby was born, Tassara left her and the baby, refusing to call her his daughter. The baby died several months later. This left Avellaneda heartbroken at the height of her career.

Avellaneda soon married a younger man, don Pedro Sabater, who worked for the Cortes and was very wealthy. He was also a writer and wrote many poems for his wife. They married on May 10, 1846. Sabater was extremely ill with what was believed to be cancer. He died shortly after their marriage, leaving Avellaneda devastated. As a result, she entered a convent right after his death and wrote a play called Egilona which did not receive good reviews as her previous one had.

In January 1853, she tried to enroll in the Royal Academy in a vacant seat that had belonged to a dead friend of hers, Juan Nicasio Gallego. Even though she was admired by many, being a woman meant that it was not her place to be writing publicly. Despite being from a wealthy and well-known upper-class family, the fame she desired from writing did not come easily. While all the males in the academy were aware of her works and were fascinated by them, they did not give her the right to enter, solely based on the fact that she was a woman.

=== Return to Cuba ===
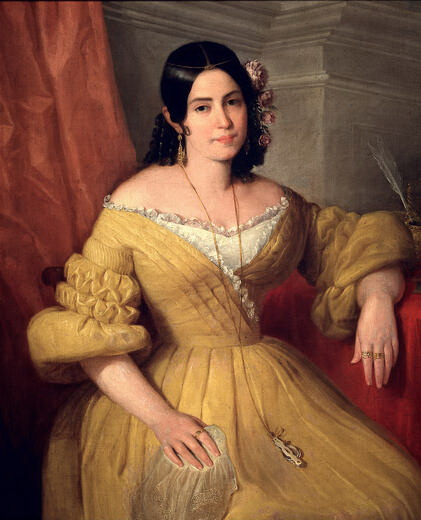
Gertrudis Gómez de Avellaneda

She remarried on April 26, 1855, to a colonel, don Domingo Verdugo y Massieu. In 1859, due to her husband's injuries they moved from Madrid back to Cuba, where both had been born. They were close to Francisco Serrano, the captain-general of Cuba at the time. When she arrived in Cuba she was warmly welcomed with concerts, parties, and music. Shortly after their arrival, Verdugo's health worsened and he finally died on October 28, 1863. This left her in severe distress and she decided to return to Madrid after a few visits to New York, London, Paris and Seville.

=== Final years and death ===
She lived in Madrid her last years. Her brother Manuel died in 1868. She published the first volume of her collected literary works (Spanish: Obras literarias), omitting the novels Sab and Dos mujeres.

At 58, she died on February 1, 1873, in Madrid, but she was buried in Seville, with her brother Manuel.

== Literary works ==
Al partir

¡Perla del mar! ¡Estrella de Occidente!
¡Hermosa Cuba! Tu brillante cielo
la noche cubre con su opaco velo
como cubre el dolor mi triste frente.

¡Voy a partir!...La chusma diligente
para arrancarme del nativo suelo
las velas iza, y pronto a su desvelo
la brisa acude de tu zona ardiente.

¡Adiós, patria feliz, edén querido!
¡Doquier que el hado en su furor me impela,
tu dulce nombre halagará mi oído!

¡Adiós¡... Ya cruje la turgente vela…
El ancla se alza... el buque,
estremecido,
las olas corta y silencioso vuela!

Al partir
On leaving

Pearl of the sea! Star of the Occident!
Beautiful Cuba! Night’s murky veil
Is drawn across the sky’s refulgent trail,
And I succumb to sorrow’s ravishment.

Now I depart! …As to their labors bent,
The crewmen now their tasks assail,
To wrest me from my home, they hoist the sail
To catch the ardent winds that you have sent.

Farewell, my Eden, land so dear!
Whatever in its furor fate now sends,
Your cherished name will grace my ear!

Farewell!... The anchor from the sea ascends,
The sails are full…. The ship breaks clear,
And with soft quiet motion, wave and water fends. ^{4}

Gomez de Avellaneda was often either praised or shunned for her literary works. She wrote poems, autobiographies, novels and plays. During the 1840s and 1850s was when she was most famous for her writings. She had other female rivals in writing such as Carolina Coronado and Rosalia de Castro but none of them achieved as much praise as Gomez de Avellaneda received from her literary works. She inspired men and women alike with her stories of love, feminism, and a changing world.

Her poetry consists of styles in Hispanic poetry from late neoclassicism through romanticism. Her works are influenced by some of the major French, English, Spanish, and Latin American poets. Her poems reflects her life experiences including her rebellious attitude and independence in a male-dominated society (regarding herself as a woman writer); sense of loneliness and exile from her Cuba (regarding her love for Cuba); and melancholy and depression (regarding her heartbroken affairs). Her poetry surrounds the themes of Cuba, love and eroticism, poetry itself, neoclassical concepts, historical references, religion, philosophical meditations, personal and public occasions, and poetic portraits.

The theme of Cuba is evident in her poem “Al partir” (“On Leaving”), which was in 1836 when la Avellaneda was on the boat leaving Cuba for Spain. It is a sonnet about her love for Cuba and reflects her emotions as she departed.

== Novels ==
The most controversial and the first novel she wrote, Sab, was published in 1841. This novel can be compared to Uncle Tom's Cabin in that both novels are literary protests against the practice of slavery. Sab is about a Cuban slave, named Sab, who is in love with Carlota, his master's daughter. Carlota (the heroine) marries a rich white Englishman, Enrique Otway. The book stresses Sab's moral superiority over the white characters. This is because his soul is pure while the Englishman's business interests are his primary concern. The enterprises of Enrique and his father are juxtaposed against the Carlota's family ingenio (sugarcane plantation) which is in decline because Carlota's father is of a good nature, which means he cannot be a good business man.

Sab was banned in Cuba for its unconventional approach to society and its problems. Avellaneda's works were considered scandalous because of her recurrent themes of interracial love and society's divisions. In fact, Sab could be considered an early example of negrismo, a literary tendency when white creole authors depicted black people, usually with a favorable stance. This kind of writing was often cultivated by women authors who might have been arguing, as Gómez de Avellaneda was, that there was a parallel between the black condition and the female condition. Two other Creole women who cultivated negrista fiction were the Argentine Juana Manuela Gorriti (Peregrinaciones de una alma triste & El ángel caído) and the Peruvian Teresa González de Fanning whose Roque Moreno paints a less than sympathetic stance toward blacks and mulattoes. Of course Harriet Beecher Stowe's Uncle Tom's Cabin could also be understood in this light.

Two famous poems were from her love letters to Ignacio de Cepeda. Both were called “A él” (“To Him”). The poems reflect her theme of love for Cepeda. The first poem, much longer and more complex than the second, regards her hope in being with Cepeda. However, because Cepeda did not want a committed relationship with her and married another woman, it made la Avellaneda suffer. As a result, the second poem is about their final break, her resignation to their relationship.

Source: John Charles Chasteen, "Born in Blood and Fire, A Concise History of Latin America"

== Legacy ==
There has been much debate over whether Gertrud's Gómez de Avellaneda is a Cuban or Spanish writer. She is widely viewed as the "epitome of the Romantic poet, the tragic heroine who rises to public acclaim yet, in private, is bitterly unhappy." Whatever the accuracy of this image, it is clear that she actively promoted it during her life and that many influential critics and admirers continued to promote this image of Avellaneda after her death. Also, much of her work is read from a biographical perspective because of the posthumous publication of her love letters to Ignacio Cepeda, to the extent that her life has overshadowed the wider cultural significance of her literary output.

== See also ==
- Sab
- Cuban literature
- 1873 in literature
- 1841 in literature
