= The Garden of Paradise =

- Short story by Hans Christian Andersen
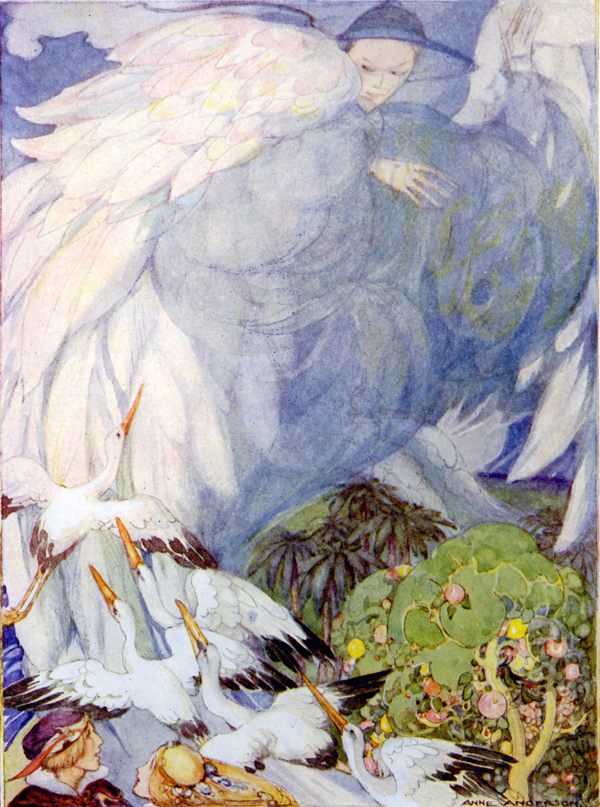
- Illustration by Anne Anderson
- Original title: Paradisets Have
- Country: Denmark
- Language: Danish
- Genre(s): Literary fairy tale

Publication
- Published in: Fairy Tales Told for Children. New Collection. Second Booklet (Eventyr, fortalte for Børn. Ny Samling. Andet Hefte)
- Publication type: Fairy tale collection
- Publisher: C. A. Reitzel
- Media type: Print
- Publication date: 19 October 1839

Chronology
The Rose Elf	The Flying Trunk

"The Garden of Paradise" (Danish: Paradisets Have) is a literary fairy tale by Hans Christian Andersen first published by C. A. Reitzel in Copenhagen, Denmark on 19 October 1839 with "The Flying Trunk" and "The Storks" in Fairy Tales Told for Children. New Collection. Second Booklet (Eventyr, fortalte for Børn. Ny Samling. Andet Hefte). Maximilian II of Bavaria read and liked the tale. Andersen biographer Jackie Wullschlager considers the story and its two companion pieces in the booklet as "grim". "The Garden of Paradise" ends with Death approaching a young prince and warning him to expiate his sins for, one day, he will come for him and "clap him in the black coffin".
