= Lili Berger =

Yiddish writer and literary critic

- Born: 30 December 1916; Białystok
- Died: 28 November 1996; Paris
- Occupations: Writer, critic, resistance fighter

Lili Berger (30 December 1916 – 27 November 1996) was a Yiddish writer, antifascist militant and literary critic.

== Life ==
Born in the region of Białystok in Poland and raised in an Orthodox Jewish family, Lili Berger was firstly schooled in Hebrew and was later sent to a secular high school in Warsaw. In 1933, she moved to Brussels, where she did studies in pedagogy. Three years later, she settled in Paris where she married Louis Gronowski, an important cadre of the Jewish section of the French Communist Party. During the 1930s, she worked for several Yiddish journals. In the years of the Second World War, she joined the French Resistance against German occupation. In 1949, she went back to Poland and settled in Warsaw. After the 1968 political crisis in Poland and faced with a rising wave of antisemitism, she left the country and resettled once again in France. She developed a rich literary activity in the Yiddish language until her death in 1996.

== Works ==
- Ekhos fun a vaytn nekhtn, Tel Aviv: Yisroel bukh, 1986.
- Eseyn un skitsn, Warsaw: Yidish bukh, 1965.
- Fun haynt un nekhtn, Warsaw: Yidish bukh, 1965.
- Fun vayt un noent, Paris: L. Berger, 1978.
- Geshtaltn un pasirungen, Paris: L. Berger, 1991.
- In gang fun tsayt, Paris: Berger, 1976.
- In loyf fun tsayt, Paris: Berger, 1988.
- Nisht farendikte bletlekh, Tel Aviv: Yisroel bukh, 1982.
- Nokhn Mabl, Warsaw: Yidish bukh, 1967.
- Oyf di khvalyes fun goyrl, Paris: L. Berger, 1986.
- Opgerisene tsvaygn, Paris: L. Berger, 1970.

== Bibliography ==
- (en) Dorothee van Tendeloo, "Berger, Lili", YIVO Encyclopedia
- van Tendeloo, Dorothée. "Paper Treasures: An Introduction to the Life and Work of the Yiddish Novelist, Literary Critic and Essayist Lili Berger (1916–1996).” Unpublished M.A. thesis, London: 2000.

== Archives ==
Lili Berger's personal archives are held in the collections of the Maison de la culture Yiddish in Paris.
