= The Swineherd =

- Short story by Hans Christian Andersen
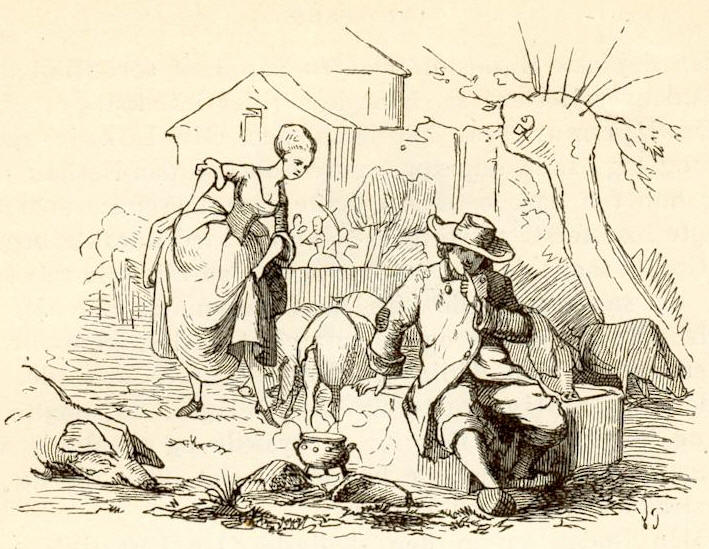
- Illustration by Vilhelm Pedersen, Andersen's first illustrator
- Original title: Svinedrengen
- Translator: Charles Boner
- Country: Denmark
- Language: Danish
- Genre: Literary fairy tale

Publication
- Published in: Fairy Tales Told for Children. New Collection. Third Booklet (Eventyr, fortalte for Børn. Ny Samling. Tredie Hefte)
- Publication type: Fairy tale collection
- Publisher: C. A. Reitzel
- Media type: Print
- Publication date: December 20, 1841
- Published in English: 1846 in A Danish Storybook

Chronology
Ole Lukøje	The Buckwheat

"The Swineherd" (Danish: Svinedrengen) is a literary fairy tale by Hans Christian Andersen about a prince who disguises himself as a swineherd to win an arrogant princess. The tale was first published December 20, 1841 by C. A. Reitzel in Copenhagen, Denmark in Fairy Tales Told for Children. New Collection. Third Booklet (Eventyr, fortalte for Børn. Ny Samling. Tredie Hefte). The tale appears to be original with Andersen though similar tales are known. "The Swineherd" has been adapted to other media.

== Plot ==
A wealthy prince wants to marry the Emperor's daughter and sends her two beautiful gifts, a nightingale and a rose. The princess rejects the humble gifts because they're real and natural, rather than artificial. The prince then disguises himself and applies for the position of swineherd at the palace. Once on the job, he creates a musical pot. The princess slogs through the mud to the swineherd's hut and pays ten kisses for the pot. When the swineherd follows the pot with the creation of a musical rattle, she pays one hundred kisses for it. The Emperor, disgusted that his daughter would kiss a swineherd for a toy, casts her out. The prince, having found the princess unworthy of his love, washes his face, dons his royal attire, and spurns the princess as her father did. The princess is left outside the palace door singing dolefully.

== Sources ==
The tale appears to be Andersen's invention though the punishing of proud princesses is a stock theme in folk and fairy tales. In Basile's Pentamerone (1634) a tale tells of proud Cinziella and her wooing by a prince disguised as a gardener. In the Grimm collections, "King Thrushbeard" is a similar tale of a royal disguising himself to woo an arrogant princess. Andersen's tale is less sentimental than the traditional tales. In traditional tales, the woman is softened and continues to love the man once he is revealed to be royalty but in Andersen she is cast away and left alone mourning the loss of love and status.

== Publication ==
The tale was first published by C. A. Reitzel in Copenhagen, Denmark on 20 December 1841 in Fairy Tales Told for Children. New Collection. Third Booklet (Eventyr, fortalte for Børn. Ny Samling. Tredie Hefte) and first translated into English by Charles Boner in 1846 who published it in A Danish Storybook.

== Analysis ==
Professor D. L. Ashliman acknowledged Andersen's literary tale as originating from similar European stories of a swineherd who flirts with a princess. The difference, however, is that the princess in those tales shows her birthmarks to the youth. Professor Stith Thompson classified such tales as Aarne–Thompson–Uther ATU 850, "The Birthmarks of the Princess".

August Leskien wrote that the "Märchenkreis" is very widespread in Slavic tradition, with the same plot: the princess sees the dancing animals (sheep, pigs, etc.) of a peasant who plays a musical instrument (flute, violin, etc.) and is interested in buying the animals, in exchange for showing her birthmarks.

== Adaptations ==
=== Stage ===
- The tale has been adapted to other media. Les cent baisers (The Hundred Kisses), is a ballet choreographed by Bronislava Nijinska to music by Baron Frederic d'Erlanger and a libretto by Boris Kochno. The ballet premiered at Covent Garden 18 July 1935 with Irina Baronova as the Princess and David Lichine as the Prince. The ballet was first staged in Australia by de Basil's Ballets Russes on 5 December 1936.
- An operatic adaptation was undertaken by Nino Rota (1911–1979) called The Swineherd Prince (Italian: Il Principe Porcaro) when he was thirteen. Britain's only permanent marionette theatre, Harlequin Puppet Theatre at Rhos-on-Sea, Wales, presented "The Swineherd" in an adaptation by Eric Brammell in 1958. In the 1950s, Soviet/Russian composer Boris Tchaikovsky wrote a suite of incidental music for a radio production of The Swineherd.
- Parts of the story have been used in Evgeny Shvarts's 1934 play The Emperor's New Clothes.

== Film ==
- Gene Deitch adapted the story (as illustrated by Bjørn Wiinblad) to film for Weston Woods Studios in 1974.
