= The Flying Trunk =

Fairy tale by Hans Christian Andersen

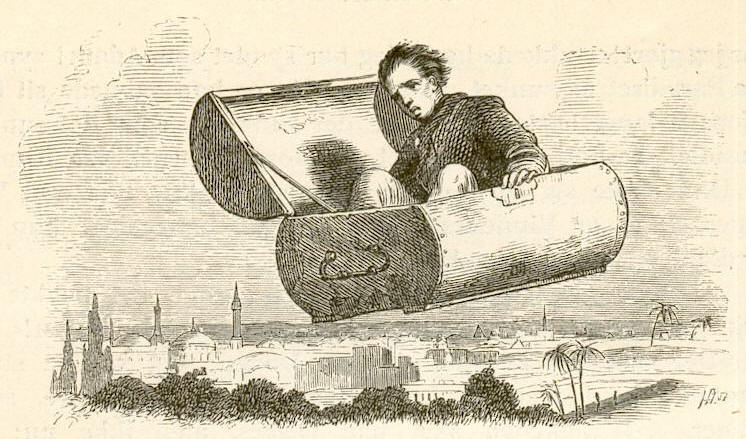
- Vilhelm Pedersen illustration
- Author: Hans Christian Andersen
- Original title: Den flyvende Kuffert
- Language: Danish
- Series: Fairy Tales Told for Children. New Collection. Second Booklet (Eventyr, fortalte for Børn. Ny Samling. Andet Hefte)
- Genre: Literary fairy tale
- Publisher: C.A. Reitzel
- Publication date: 19 October 1839
- Publication place: Denmark
- Media type: Print

"The Flying Trunk" (Danish: Den flyvende Kuffert) is a literary fairy tale by the Danish poet and author Hans Christian Andersen about a young man who has a flying trunk that carries him to Turkey where he visits the Sultan's daughter. The tale was first published 1839.

== Plot summary ==
A young man squanders his inheritance until he has nothing left but a few shillings (four or five coins), a pair of slippers, and an old dressing-gown. A friend sends him a trunk with directions to pack up and be off. Having nothing to pack, he gets into the trunk himself. The trunk is enchanted and carries him to the land of the Turks. He uses the trunk to visit the sultan's daughter, who is kept in a tower because of a prophecy that her marriage would be unhappy.

== Analysis ==
English poet Julia Pardoe, on her introduction to The Thousand and One Days, a compilation of Middle Eastern folktales, remarked that its tale The Story of the Princess Schirine was "the groundwork" of Andersen's tale.

== Adaptations ==
- In 2014, a musical theatre adaptation of "The Flying Trunk" by Bobby Sample (book, lyrics, and music), with music by Josh Hontz, Katie Sample, and Connor Sample, debuted at Spotlight Youth Theatre of Glendale, Arizona. This adaptation won the 2014 National Youth Arts Award for Outstanding New Musical.

== See also ==
- List of works by Hans Christian Andersen
- Vilhelm Pedersen, first illustrator of Andersen's fairy tales
