= Ellen La Motte =

American nurse, journalist and author

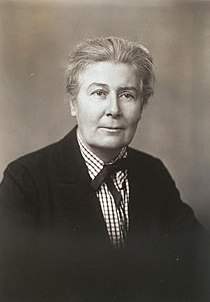
- Ellen La Motte, ca. 1910-1915
- Born: November 27, 1873; Louisville, Kentucky, United States
- Died: March 2, 1961 (aged 87)
- Other name: Ellen Newbold La Motte Ellen N. La Motte
- Occupations: Nurse; Journalist; Author
- Known for: Publications about her experience as a nurse on the frontline during the First World War
- Notable work: The Backwash of War (1916)
- Awards: Lin Tse Hsu Memorial Medal

Ellen Newbold La Motte (1873–1961) was an American nurse, journalist and author. She is known for her book The Backwash of War in which she chronicled her experience as a nurse in World War I in an often bitter and cynical manner. She was also a leading practitioner in the treatment of tuberculosis and an advocate for addressing opium addiction in China.

== Life and career ==
La Motte was born in 1873 in Louisville to a relatively privileged family of French heritage. She began her nursing career as a tuberculosis nurse in Baltimore, Maryland, having graduated from Johns Hopkins Hospital in 1902. She recognised that effective treatment of the disease could only come from the separation of patients with tuberculosis from patients with other illnesses. She was also keen to delegate assessment and treatment of the patients to nurses rather than doctors. Although her methods with criticised by the Tuberculosis Association, La Motte became the superintendent of the Tuberculosis Division of the Baltimore Health Department by 1913. Inspired by her work, she published her first book, The Tuberculosis Nurse in 1914.

In 1915, she volunteered as one of the first American war nurses to go to Europe and treat soldiers in World War I. She was encouraged to do so by her friend, the American author Gertrude Stein, who at the time lived in Paris. During this period, she met American heiress Emily Crane Chadbourne, her life partner with whom she would travel and share a home until the end of her life. In Belgium she served in a French field hospital, keeping a bitter diary detailing the horrors that she witnessed daily. Fourteen of these vignettes were published in Atlantic Monthly, before being collectively published as The Backwash of War: The Human Wreckage of the Battlefield as Witnessed by an American Hospital Nurse in 1916. Despite early success, the brutal imagery was unpalatable and the book was suppressed. By 1917, it was banned by the American Government and was not republished until 1934. Researchers have speculated that Ernest Hemingway's influential unadorned style may have been influenced by La Motte's own writing, through Stein's mentoring.

After the war, La Motte, accompanied by Chadbourne, travelled to Asia, where she witnessed the horrors of opium addiction. These travels provided her with material for six books, three of them explicitly dealing with the opium problem: Peking Dust (1919), Civilization: Tales of the Orient (1919), Opium Monopoly (1920), Ethics of Opium (1922), Snuffs and Butters (1925) and Opium in Geneva: Or How The Opium Problem is Handled by the League of Nations (1929). The Chinese Nationalist government awarded her the Lin Tse Hsu Memorial Medal in 1930.

La Motte took over Chadbourne's financial affairs in 1937 and earned over 1 million dollars on the stock market during the 1940s and '50s. In 1959, she played a significant role in the revitalization of Crane Co., the company founded by Chadbourne's father. La Motte remained active in nursing and literary communities in her later life. She died in 1961.

== Footnotes ==
=== Bibliography ===
Robson, Martin (ed.). (2014). Introduction. In: La Motte, Ellen N. [1916]. The Backwash of War. Great Britain: Conway Publishing. ISBN 978-1-84486-258-0– via Internet Archive.
