= John Tallis =

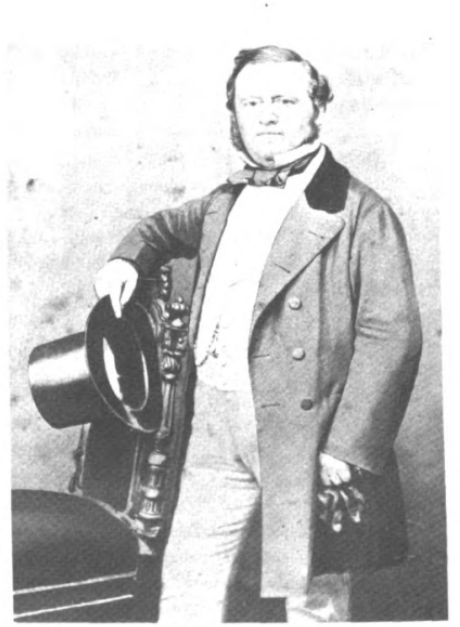
Photograph of cartographic publisher John Tallis, ca.1858

John Tallis (7 November 1817 – 3 June 1876) was an English cartographic publisher. His company, John Tallis & Company, published views, maps and atlases in London from roughly 1838 to 1851.

Tallis set up as a publisher with Frederick Tallis in Cripplegate in 1842; the business moved to Smithfield in 1846, and was dissolved in 1849. From 1851 to 1854 Tallis operated as John Tallis & Company. He started the Illustrated News of the World which issued engraved portraits as supplements in a series entitled ‘National Portrait Gallery of eminent personages' in 1858, selling it for £1,370 in 1861; it folded in 1863. The series was subsequently republished in a number of separate volumes.

He lived in New Cross, South East London. His house on New Cross Road is listed as a Building of Special Architectural or Historic Interest, grade II. It has a blue plaque on the wall to signal the event.

== Gallery ==
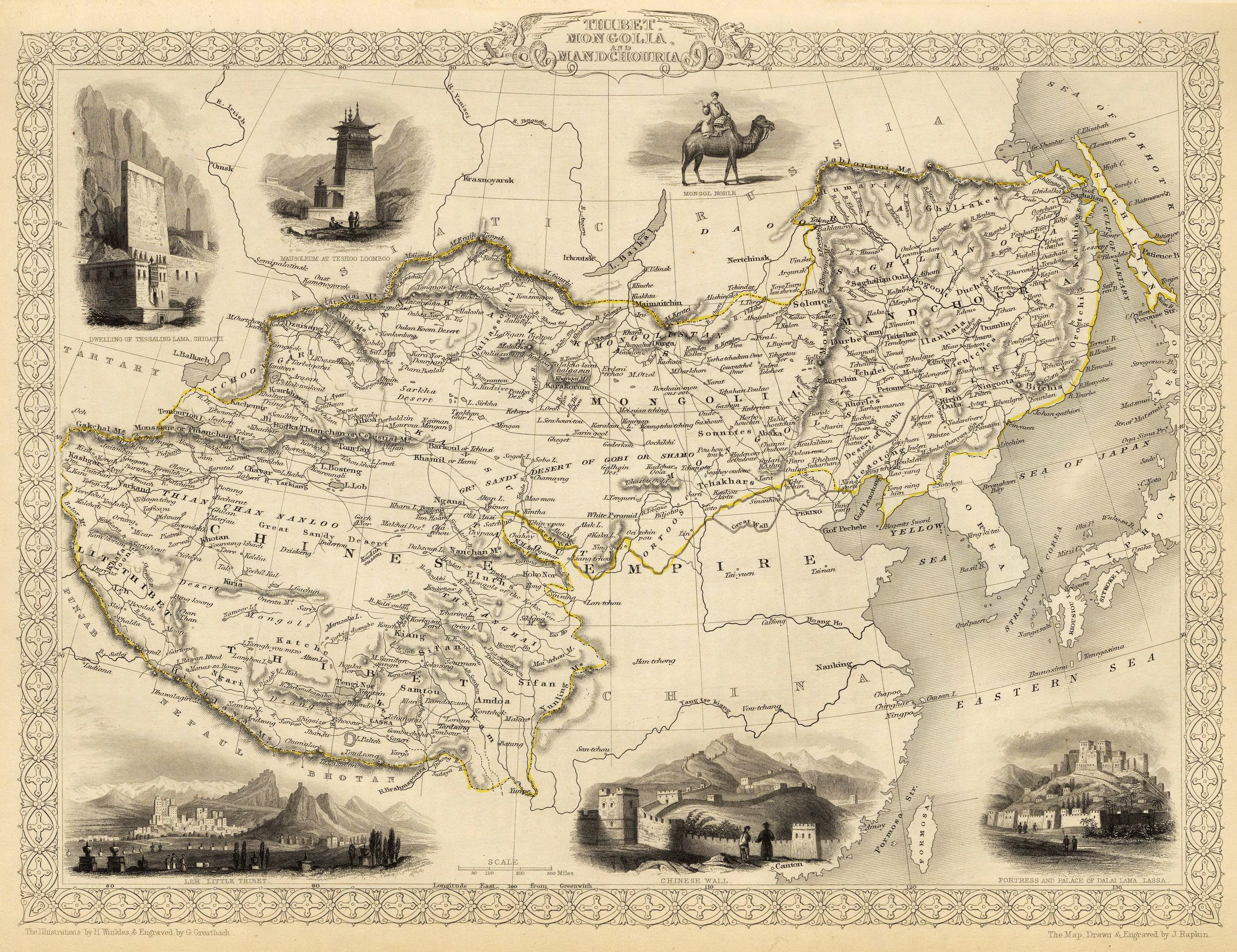
Map of the northern and western part of the Chinese Empire - "Tibet, Mongolia, and Manchuria", from Tallis' atlas of the world (1851)

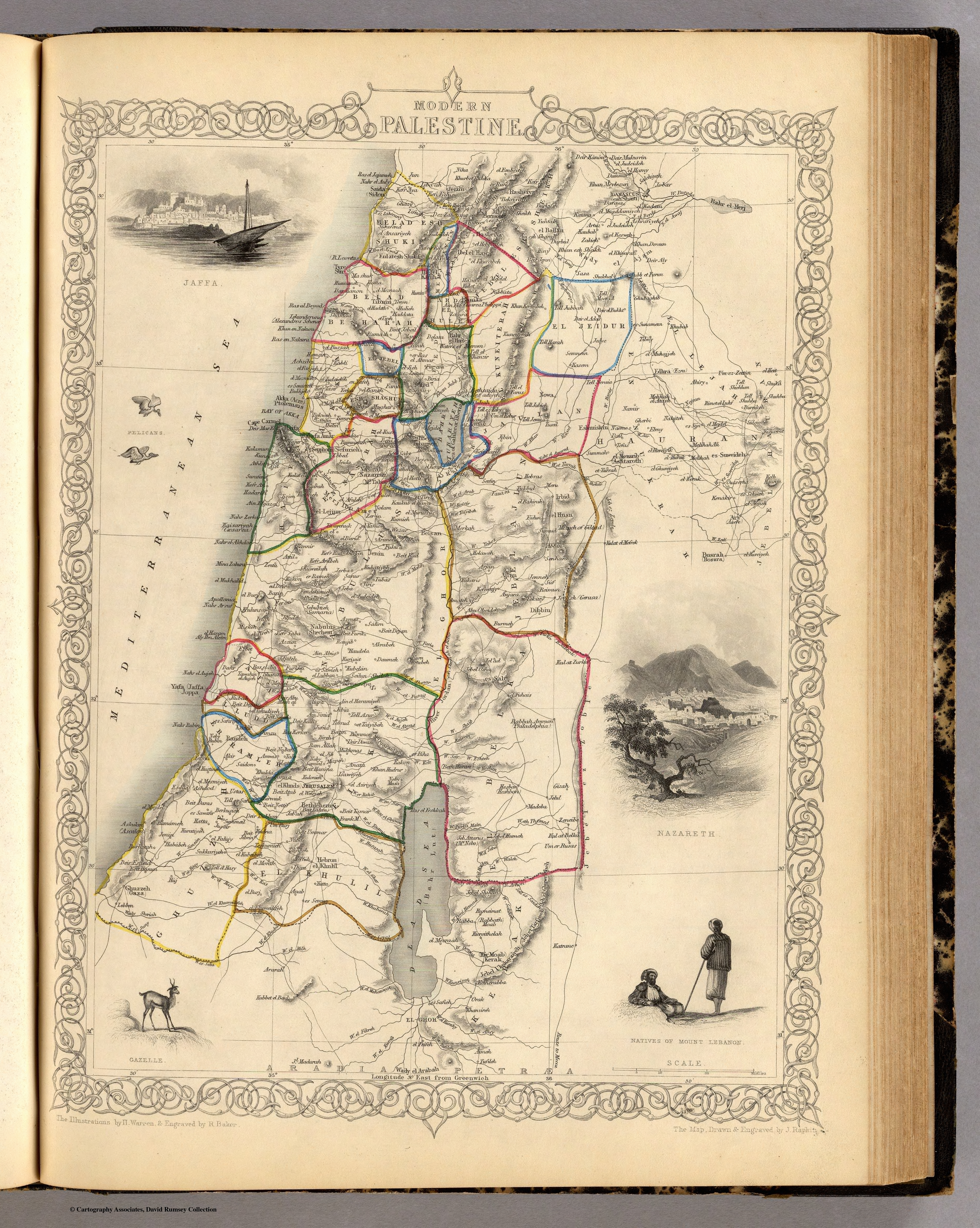
Map of Palestine in 1851, showing the Kaza subdivisions. At the time, the region shown was split between the Sidon Eyalet and the Damascus Eyalet

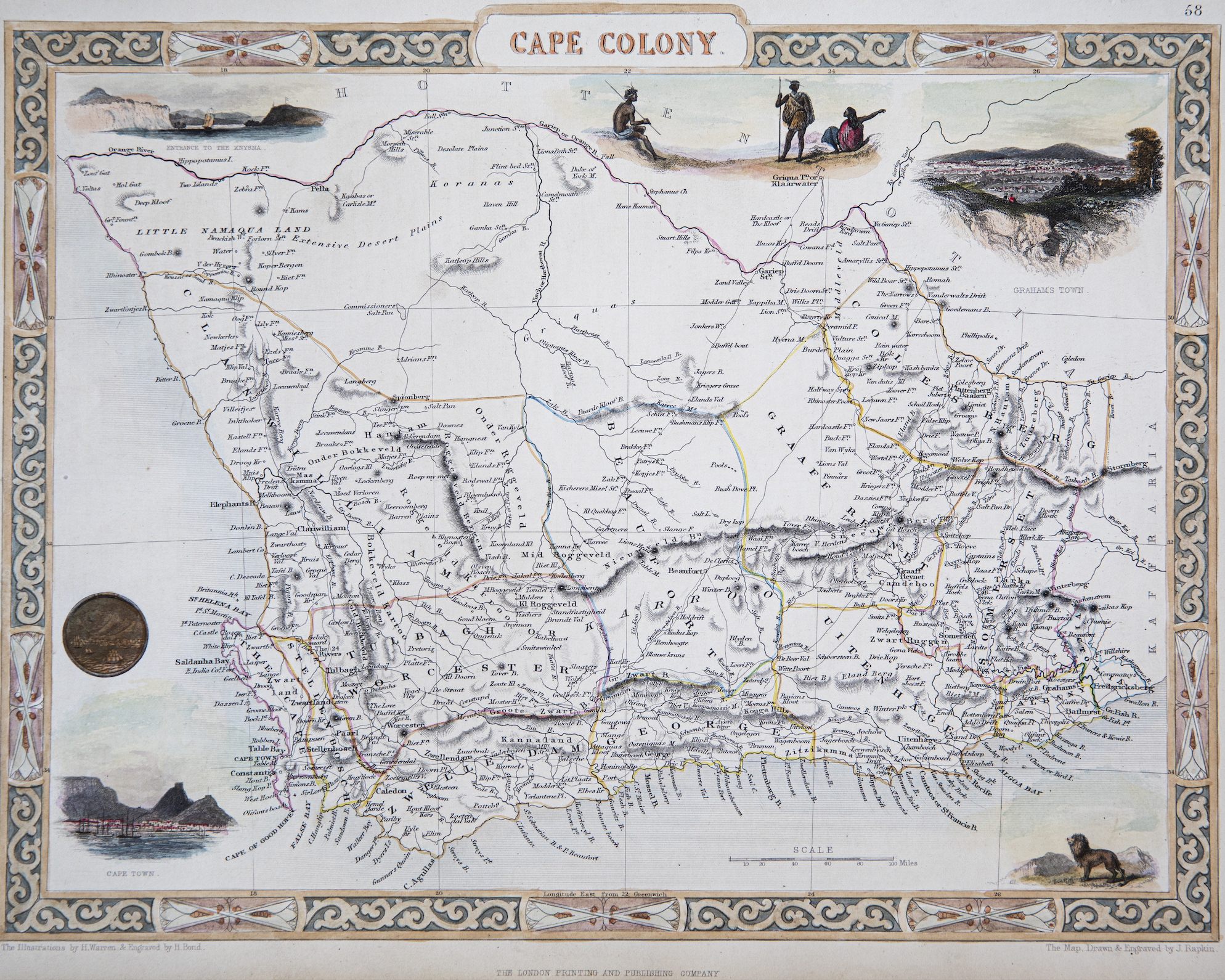
1850 Tallis Map of the Cape Colony

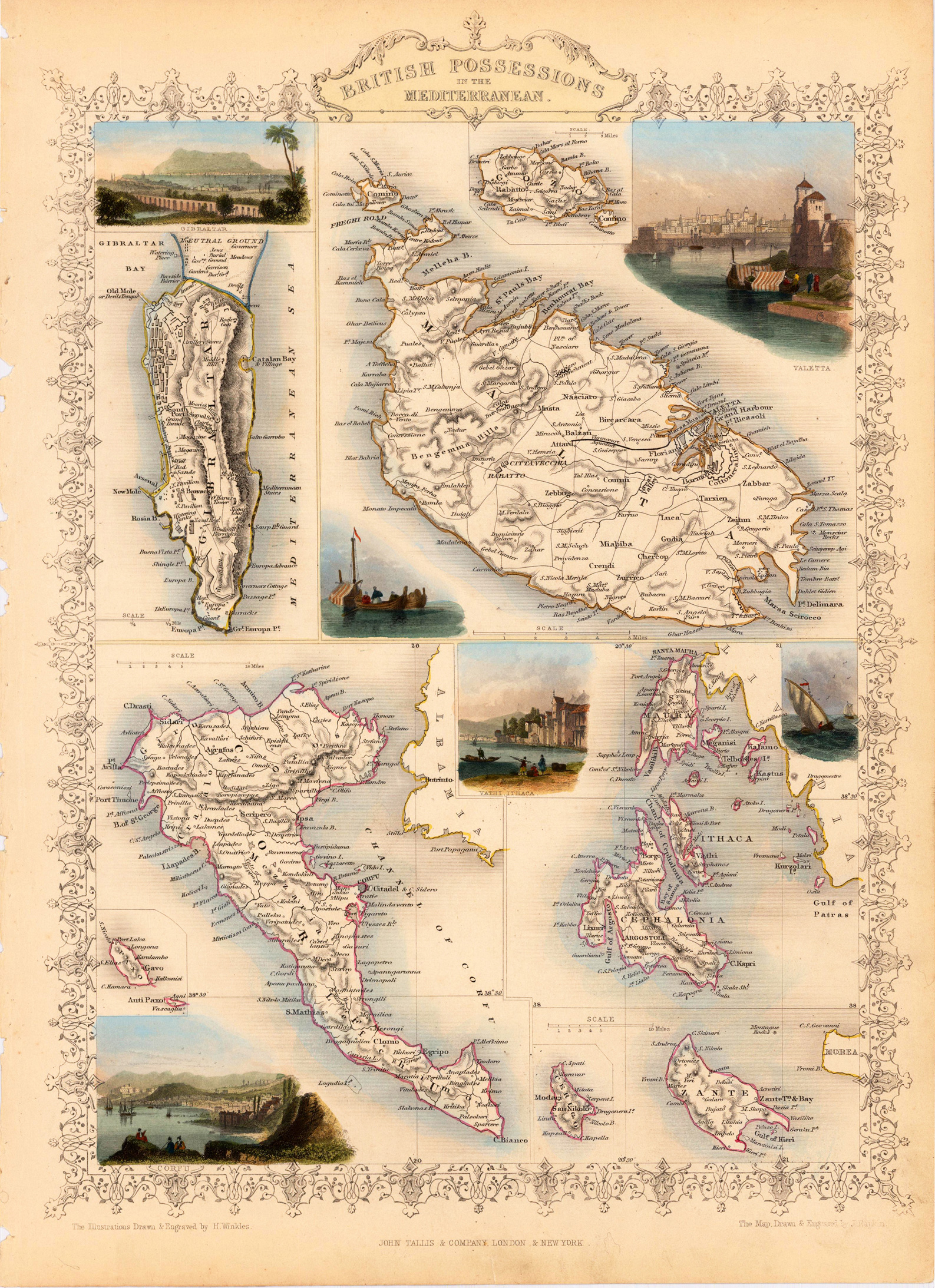
1851 Tallis map of British Possessions in the Mediterranean (engraved by John Rapkin)

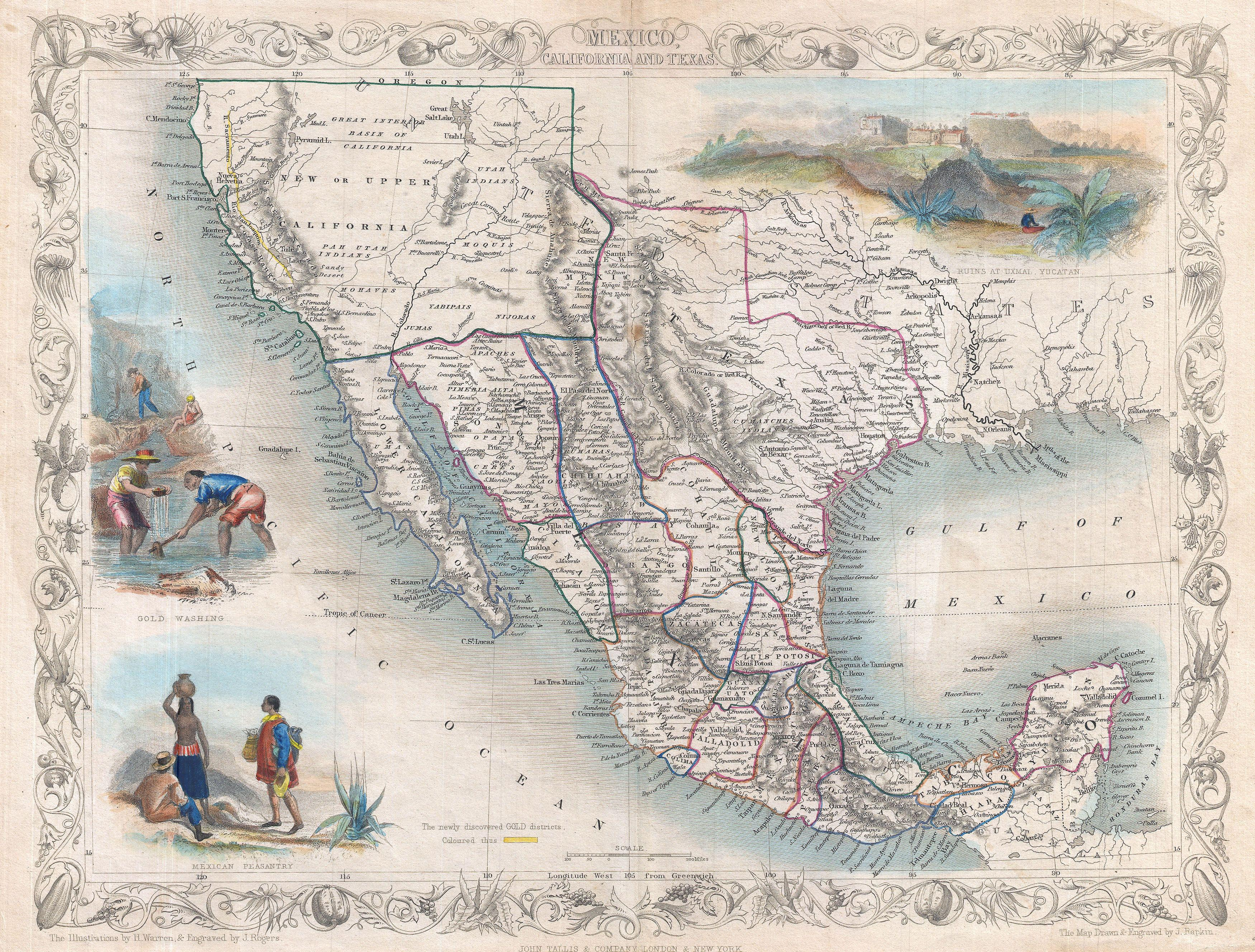
1851 Tallis Map of Mexico

Map titled 'Kabul, the Punjab, and Balochistan', by John Tallis, London, 1851

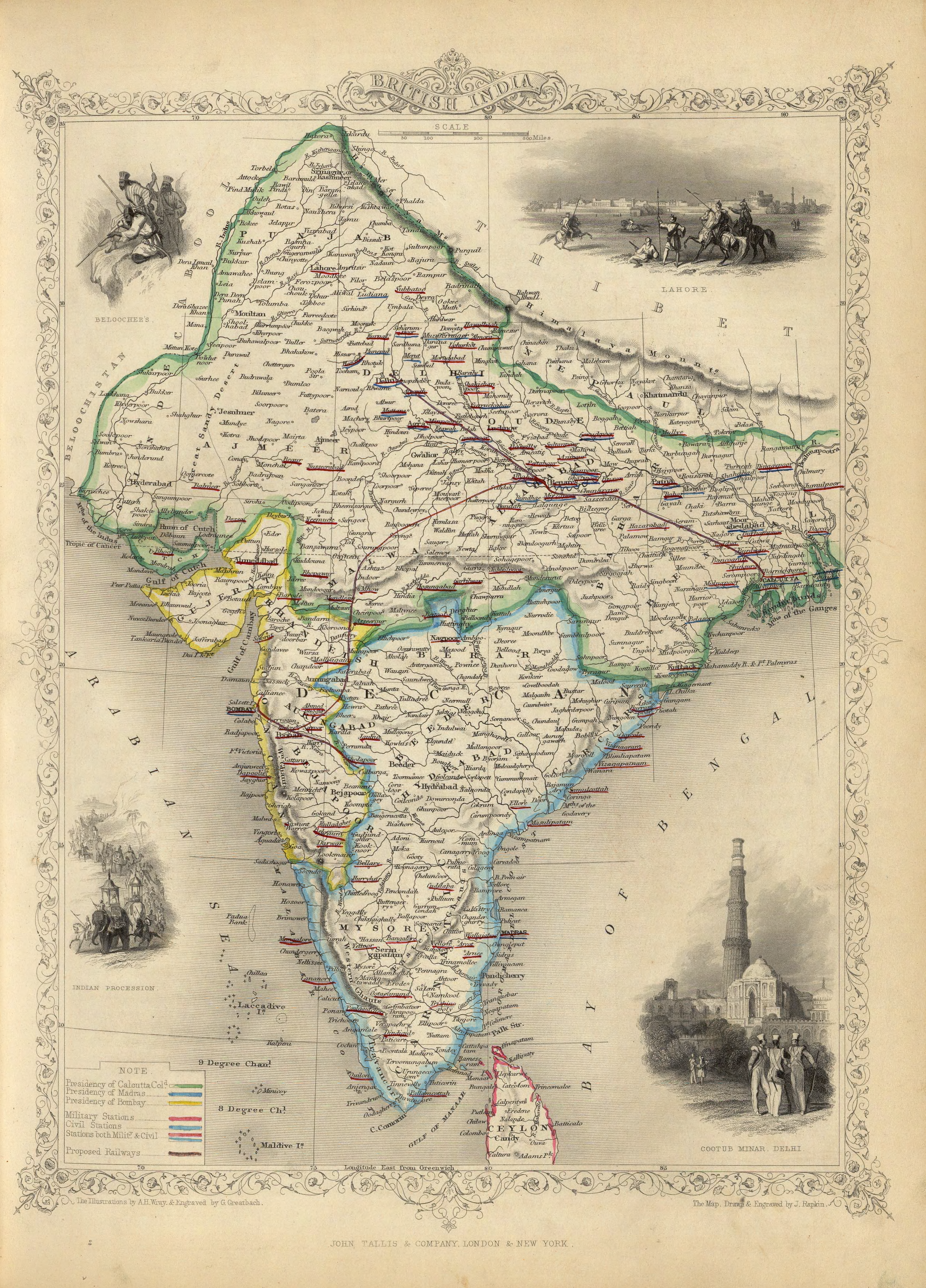
Map of British India, showing principal administrative divisions, London & New York, 1851
