= Ole Lukøje =

Fairy tale by Hans Christian Andersen

- Short story by Hans Christian Andersen
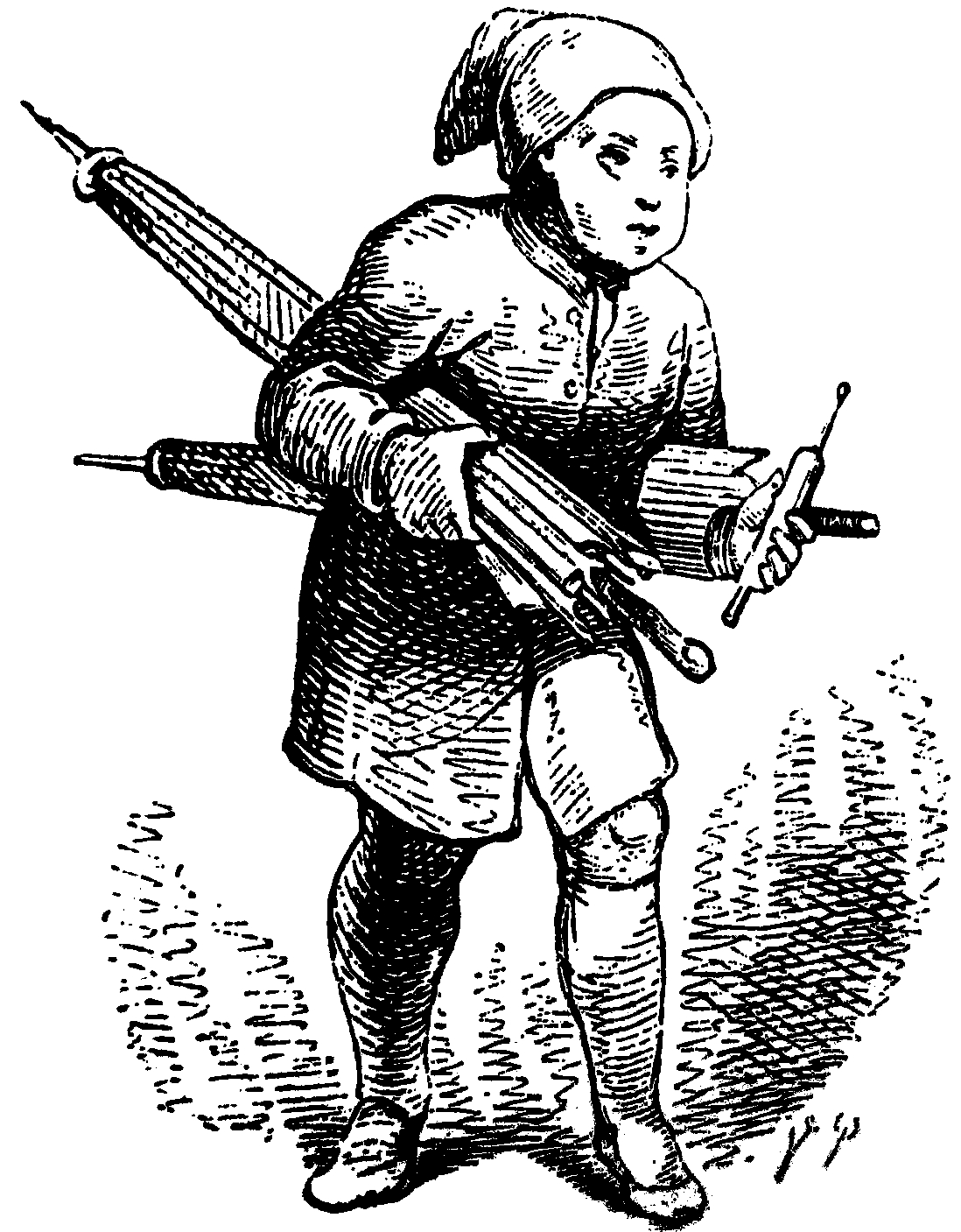
- Vilhelm Pedersen drew this representation of the Sandman for the fairytale "Ole Lukøje" (Mr. Sandman) by Hans Christian Andersen.
- Original title: Ole Lukøje
- Country: Denmark
- Language: Danish
- Genre(s): Litereary fairy tale

Publication
- Published in: Fairy Tales Told for Children. New Collection. Third Booklet (Eventyr, fortalte for Børn. Ny Samling. Tredie Hefte)
- Publication type: Fairy tale collection
- Publisher: C. A. Reitzel
- Media type: Print
- Publication date: 20 December 1841

Chronology
—	The Swineherd

"Ole Lukøje" is a literary fairy tale by Hans Christian Andersen based upon a folk tale telling of a mysterious mythic creature of the Sandman who gently takes children to sleep and, depending on how good or bad they were, shows them various dreams.

Under each arm he carries an umbrella; one of them, with pictures on the inside, he spreads over the good children, and then they dream the most beautiful stories the whole night. But the other umbrella has no pictures, and this he holds over the naughty children so that they sleep heavily, and wake in the morning without having dreamed at all.

Ole Lukøje's name is actually composed of two parts: Ole is a common Danish masculine name, and Lukøje a compound of the Danish words for 'close' and 'eye'. In the tale, he visits a boy called Hjalmar every night for a whole week and tells him stories. Ole Lukøje is later revealed to be a dream god, and in his final tale on Sunday he tells of his brother, likewise called Ole Lukøje but also Death, who closes the eyes of those he visits and takes them away with him.

== Ole Lukøje on Death ==
"I will show you my brother. He is also called Ole-Luk-Oie but he never visits any one but once, and when he does come, he takes him away on his horse, and tells him stories as they ride along. He knows only two stories.

"One of these is so wonderfully beautiful, that no one in the world can imagine anything at all like it; but the other is just as ugly and frightful, so that it would be impossible to describe it."

Then Ole-Luk-Oie lifted Hjalmar up to the window. "There now, you can see my brother, the other Ole-Luk-Oie; he is also called Death.

"You see, he doesn't look as bad as in the picture books, where he is a skeleton! No, now his coat is embroidered with silver, and he wears the splendid uniform of a hussar, and a mantle of black velvet flies behind him, over the horse. Look, how he gallops along."

"Jeg vil vise Dig min Broder, han hedder ogsaa Ole Lukøie, men han kommer aldrig til nogen meer end eengang og naar han kommer, tager han dem med paa sin Hest og fortæller dem Historier.

"Han kan kun to, een der er saa mageløs deilig, at ingen i Verden kan tænke sig den, og een der er saa fæl og gruelig - ja det er ikke til at beskrive!"

Og saa løftede Ole Lukøie den lille Hjalmar op i Vinduet og sagde, "der skal Du see min Broder, den anden Ole Lukøie! de kalde ham ogsaa Døden!

"Seer Du, han seer slet ikke slem ud, som i Billedebøgerne, hvor han er Been og Knokler! nei, det er Sølvbroderi han har paa Kjolen: det er den deiligste Husar-Uniform! en Kappe af sort Fløiel flyver bag ud over Hesten! See hvor han rider i Gallop."

== See also ==
- Wee Willie Winkie
