= Sab (novel) =

1841 novel written by Gertrudis Gomez de Avellaneda

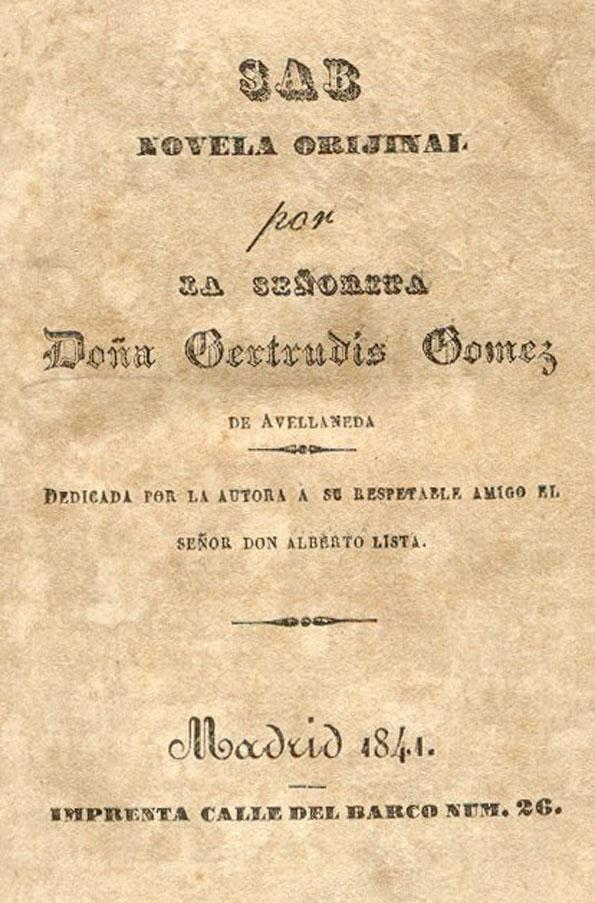
- Author: Gertrudis Gomez de Avellaneda
- Language: Spanish
- Publication date: 1841
- Publication place: Spain

Sab is a novel written by Gertrudis Gomez de Avellaneda and published in Madrid in 1841. The novel centers around the character of Sab, a mulato slave who is in love with his white master's daughter Carlota. The pain of Sab's unrequited love for Carlota leads Sab to his own death, which occurs during Carlota's wedding to Enrique Otway. The novel was not published in Cuba until 1914.

Sab is regarded by some scholars as an anti-slavery novel, and some have also suggested that it criticizes the institution of marriage. The novel was written a decade before Harriet Beecher Stowe's Uncle Tom's Cabin. According to Nina M. Scott, Sab, just like Beecher Stowe's novel, criticizes slavery as a displacement of what Elizabeth Ammons calls "maternal values by a profit-hungry masculine ethic [the slave economy] that regards human beings as... commodities." The publishing of Sab is considered a precursor to the antislavery movements.

For another critic, Sab is "the only feminist-abolitionist novel published by a woman in nineteenth-century Spain or its slave-holding colony Cuba."

== Plot ==
The novel is set on a sugar plantation located halfway between the city of Santa María de Puerto Príncipe (modern-day Camagüey) and the village of Cubitas. While most of the novel takes places at the plantation, some of it takes place in Puerto Príncipe, in the Cubitas Mountains, and in the northern port of Guanaja. Enrique Otway, an English tradesman, seeks to marry Carlota because he thinks that this arrangement will bring him money. As the story develops, Sab learns of Enrique's dishonorable conduct and tries to secretly aid Carlota.

== Background ==
Although Sab was initially published in Madrid in December 1841, Avellaneda began writing the book in Cuba and continued working on it during the two-month journey to Europe in 1836.

== Translations ==
Sab was translated into English by Nina M. Scott in 1993, and published by the University of Texas Press.
