= The Home; or, Family Cares and Family Joys =

1839 novel by Fredrika Bremer

The Home; or, Family Cares and Family Joys (Swedish: Hemmet, eller, familje-sorger och fröjder) is an 1839 Swedish novel written by Fredrika Bremer. The first English edition, translated by Mary Howitt, was published at London, 1843; and a German edition (Das Haus, oder Familiensorgen und Familienfreuden), Leipzig, 1844. An alternative English edition, translated by E A Friedlaender, was published at London in 1849.

== Background ==
In The Home, Fredrika Bremer for the first time shows herself as the champion of the emancipation of women and their advancement. For years afterward, and especially after her return from a visit to America, it became Bremer's aim in life to deliver also the Swedish woman from the restrictions in her social position. Long before Bremer wrote The Home, the social conditions which confined woman's activities within very narrow limits and left her helpless, unless she was “happily” married, had aroused the author's indignation. Her bitterness increased when Göta Superior Court opposed the proposition that women, at the age of 25, should have the legal right to manage their own affairs. Through the study of the writings of Harriet Martineau, Bremer had become convinced that reform by law was necessary.

== Characters and themes ==
The chief character in The Home is Elisa Frank and her relations to her husband, Judge Frank, and her children form the main theme. Fredrika and her own sisters served as models for the daughters whose characters are convincingly described. Petrea, “ready to give away indiscriminately the presents which had been given to her,” is the author herself. Tenderness is shown in the description of the death of Henrik (her brother August), while her humor is at its best where Petrea and Jeremiah are described.

== Evaluation ==
The Home, though not as absorbing as Grannarna, which was translated into many languages and made Bremer famous, it is more true to life. Though the plan of construction of The Home shows a certain weakness, the characters are drawn with superior skill.
