= Susan Marr Spalding =

American poet (1841–1908)

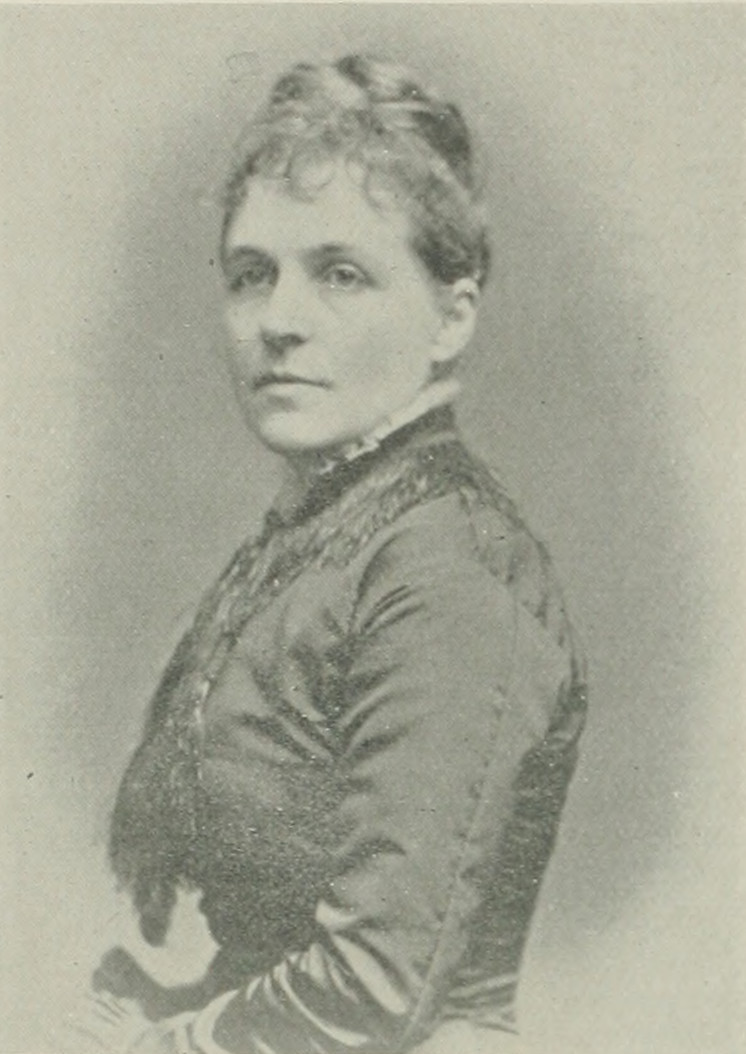
- Photo in A Woman of the Century
- Born: Susan Marr; July 4, 1841; Bath, Maine, U.S.
- Died: March 12, 1908 (aged 66); West Medford, Massachusetts, U.S.
- Occupation: Poet
- Spouse: Mr. Spalding
- Writing career
- Notable work: "Fate"

Susan Marr Spalding (née, Marr; July 4, 1841 – March 12, 1908) was an American poet of the long nineteenth century. Spalding was best known and least known by her poem, "Fate". The poem itself was widely copied and claimed, and its title was sometimes changed to "Kismet", but not until 1893 was Spalding's right of authorship absolutely settled.

== Early life and education ==
Susan Marr was born in Bath, Maine, July 4, 1841. Her youth was passed in Bath, and she was educated at one of the best New England seminaries. After her parents died when she was still a girl, she moved to New York City to live in the family of her uncle, a clergyman.

== Career ==
In 1860, at 18, she married 32-year-old Rodolphus Spalding, a literary man. Residing a few years in New York, they removed to Philadelphia, where, shortly after, her husband died. She continued living there, alternating between it and her home town, becoming involved with various subjects. Her time was passed mostly among relatives and friends in answer to the demands made upon her as nurse and counselor.

Her poetical career dates back to her girlhood. Her poems were artistic productions, and she excelled in sonnet writing, ranking among the most successful sonnet writers of the day. She contributed to many prominent periodicals.

Fate

Two shall be born the whole wide world apart,
And speak in different tongues, and have no thought
Each of the other's being, and no heed;
And these o'er unknown seas to unknown lands
Shall cross, escaping wreck, defying death;
And, all unconsciously, shape every act
And bend each wandering step to this one end:
That, one day, out of darkness they shall meet.

And two shall walk some narrow way of life
So nearly side by side that, should one turn
Ever so little space to right or left,
They needs must stand acknowledged face to face,
And yet, with wistful eyes that never meet,
With groping hands that never clasp, and lips
Calling in vain to ears that never hear,
They seek each other all their weary days
And die unsatisfied – and that is Fate!

Spalding was best known and least known by her poem, "Fate". The poem itself was widely copied and claimed, and its title was sometimes changed to "Kismet", but not until 1893 was Spalding's right of authorship absolutely settled. Edwin Milton Royle, who used it in his play of Friends, was inundated with letters from persons purporting to be its author, so that he placed Spalding's name upon all his programmes. The lines first appeared in print in the New York Graphic in 1876. Spalding said,— "I happen to have still in my possession the note from William Augustus Croffut –one of The Graphic's editors– accepting the poem, speaking of it in the highest terms and expressing his regret that the New York Graphic could not pay for poetry, which letter has more than once quenched a too-insistent claimant. It is, by the way, the only bit of blank verse I ever wrote." "Fate" was set to music by Emma Lore.

Commonly, she wintered in Wilmington, Delaware, but in 1894, she made her home in Boston, and then traveled abroad. Spalding died in West Medford, Massachusetts, March 12, 1908.

== Style and themes ==
According to Current Literature Publishing Company (1895):—"Her sonnets have been characterized by a critic as among the finest in the English language. A singular charm pervades all her verse. Its art was always sure, her methods of composition being invariably conscientious and painstaking, while its spirit –whether dealing with pathos or passion– is of rare grace and beauty. One sonnet in particular, "The Singers", fairly takes one's breath away with its pity and power."

Charles Wells Moulton positively reviewed her work, writing in 1890 that:

There is in her poems an admirable grace and freedom, and an attractive reverence, delicacy of perception and beauty of expression. She is tender, passionate, refined and intense—a truly artistic temperament. A singular charm pervades her verses, with their exquisite art and deep, poetic pathos. It is, perhaps, as a sonnet writer that Spalding will find the highest recognition and her most enduring fame. Artistically considered, they are very nearly beyond criticism, perfect in execution, and of exquisite finish. This peculiar and difficult form of poetical composition has always possessed for her a fascinating charm. A careful study of its artistic requirements and a conscientious and painstaking habit of composition have resulted so successfully that she is considered by many competent critics as one of the best sonnet writers of the day, triumphantly refuting the oft-repeated assertion that the feminine mind cannot achieve a perfect sonnet. Aside from the value of the artistic expression, workmanship and thought, a subtle poetic essence pervades them all; they are poems in every essential quality and of the highest sense. Their peculiar charm will especially endear them to every lover of the sonnet.

— The Magazine of Poetry, Volume 2, page 387

== Selected works ==
- The Wings of Icarus, 1892
