= Captain Pamphile =

1839 novel by Alexandre Dumas

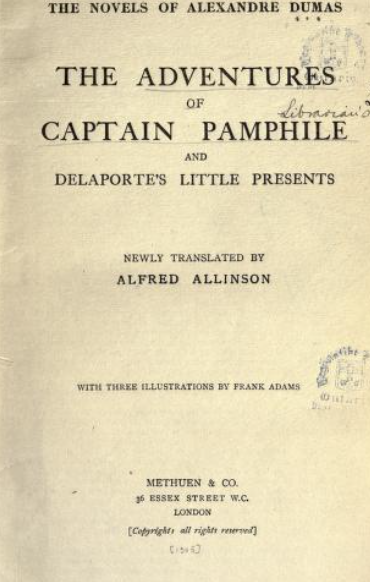
- Title page for The Adventures of Captain Pamphile (1905)
- Author: Alexandre Dumas
- Language: French
- Genre: Adventure
- Publication date: 1839
- Publication place: France
- Media type: Print

Captain Pamphile or The Adventures of Captain Pamphile (French: Le Capitaine Pamphile) is an 1839 French adventure novel by Alexandre Dumas. It was aimed at children and had a strong anti-slavery message. It was translated into English in 1850.

== Bibliography ==
- Marcel Dorigny. The Abolitions of Slavery: From Lʹeger Fʹelcitʹe Sonthonax to Victor Schoelcher, 1793, 1794, 1848. Berghahn Books, 2003.
