= Gilbert Waterhouse =

English poet (1883–1916)

- Born: 22 January 1883; Chatham, Kent
- Died: 1 July 1916 (aged 33); The Battle of the Somme
- Education: Bancroft's School
- Occupation: Architect

Gilbert Waterhouse (22 January 1883 – 1 July 1916), was an English architect and, later, war poet. He was killed on the first day of the Battle of the Somme, in World War I, while serving as a second lieutenant in the 2nd Bn Essex Regiment. A volume of his poems, Rail-Head and other poems (including the poems Rail-Head and Bivouacs), was published posthumously in 1916.

== Early life ==
Waterhouse was born the third child of seven at Chatham Kent on 22 January 1883. His father was a shipbroker. He was educated at Bancroft's School from 1894–1900 and then at the University of London. At the time of the UK 1901 national census, the family were living in East London, where Gilbert's occupation, aged 18, was given as a ship's draughtsman. He later qualified as an architect (RIBA) and gave his profession as "architect-surveyor" when he enlisted in the army on 8 September 1914. One of his architectural projects is recorded here.

== Army service ==
Waterhouse enlisted after the outbreak of World War I as a private, aged 31, in the 18th (Service) Battalion, Royal Fusiliers (1st Public Schools). He applied for a commission in April 1915, and became an officer in May 1915, when he was posted as a second lieutenant to the 3rd (Reserve) Battalion, Essex Regiment at Harwich, a training unit for officers and soldiers. His sonnet "Coming in splendour thro' the golden gate" appeared in The English Review in October 1915.

It is not known when he was posted to 2nd Battalion Essex Regiment in France, but National Archive contain a telegram to his father, dated 25 February 1916, stating that Waterhouse has been "admitted to No 3 General Hospital Le Treport 22 Feb suffering from septic left arm, slight."

== The Somme ==
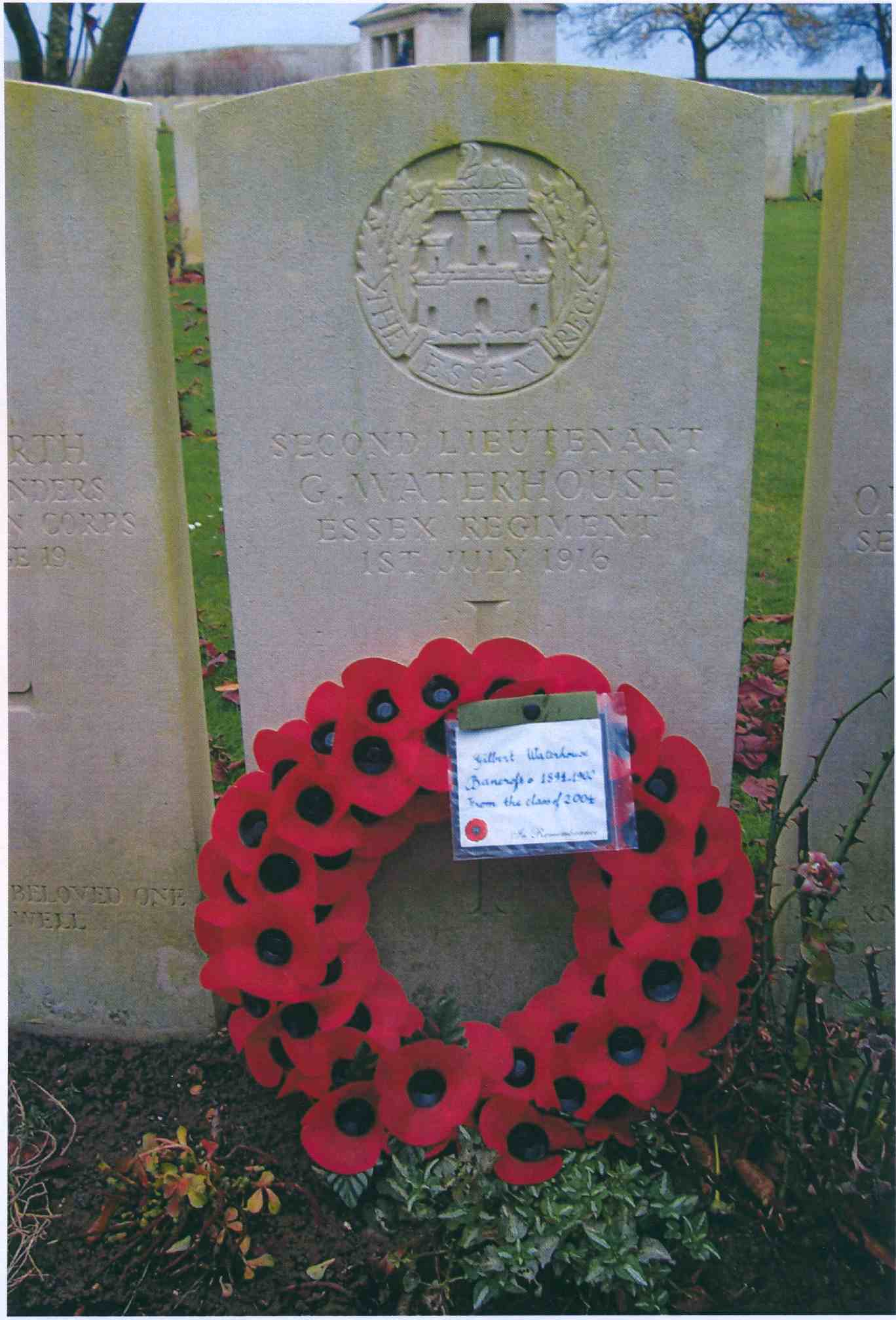
Serre Road Cemetery Grave

Waterhouse returned to his unit, the 2nd Battalion, The Essex Regiment, at some stage prior to the Battle of the Somme. This Battalion was part of the 12th Brigade of the 4th Infantry Division

On 1 July, Waterhouse was serving with C Company. His unit was stationed in the line south of the village of Serre. At the start of the assault the 2nd Bn had comprised 24 officers and 606 other ranks. By the end of the day it was decimated and finished it with only two officers and 192 other ranks unscathed.

Waterhouse was initially posted "wounded and missing". His personal records are available in the UK National Archives and it is clear from survivor testimony that he either died of wounds or was killed after being initially wounded and cared for by his servant. However he was not formally pronounced dead until March 1917, leaving his family in some anguish and forlorn hope he may have been taken prisoner.

From Pte J Adkins 15951 St John's Hospital Etaples 11 July 1916:

'I last saw Lt Waterhouse on the 1st July about 9.30 am two hours after the start.

He was a very brave man and he stood out more conspicuously than anyone. He seemed so fearless….

'On the 1 July between Serre Wood and Beaumont, about 9.30 in the morning, I had got over one German trench and was advancing to a second when I was hit in the back. I was carrying bombs and I was going on again when I caught sight of Lt Waterhouse about 30 yards from me. He had a revolver in his hand and he stood out, a solitary figure. I saw him drop to his knees and begin to crawl and I did the same and so did his platoon. I thought at the time he had seen an MG and was avoiding the fire but he may have been hit.’

His body was not recovered until after the battle, when he was buried in the CWGC Serre Road No.2 cemetery around July 1917.

== Poetry ==
Waterhouse left behind a volume, published posthumously in December 1916, entitled Rail-Head and Other Poems. This contains only 24 pieces, most of them written before the war or before he arrived at the front. Some half a dozen are "trench" poems displaying powers of observation, precise expression and emerging satiric humour.Comment by David Giles Bancroft's School, Head of English (retired)

One of the more famous poems in the book is "Bivouacs".

He is commemorated at Bancroft's School on the World War I War Memorial Honours Board, and a fuller biography is available online here
