= The Tomb of Ts'in =

1916 novel by Edgar Wallace

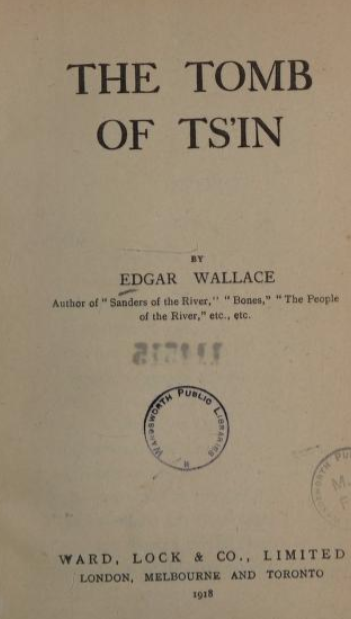
- Title page for The Tomb of Ts'in (1918 edition)
- Author: Edgar Wallace
- Language: English
- Genre: Adventure
- Publisher: Ward Lock
- Publication date: 1916
- Publication place: United Kingdom
- Media type: Print
- Pages: 124
- ISBN: 1539707652

The Tomb of Ts'in is a 1916 adventure novel by the British writer Edgar Wallace. Some passages of the plot appear to copy word-for-word his earlier story Captain Tatham (1909). It is suggested that Wallace's embarrassment about recycling his work led to buying up most of the copies later, although the shortage of available copies may have to do with the fact that very few were originally printed by the publishers Ward Lock due to wartime shortages.

It involves a search for hidden treasure in China where an adventurer seeks out the missing tomb of Emperor Qin Shi Huang. It predates the actual discovery of the Emperor's tomb by more than half a century.
