= Fairy Tales Told for Children. New Collection =

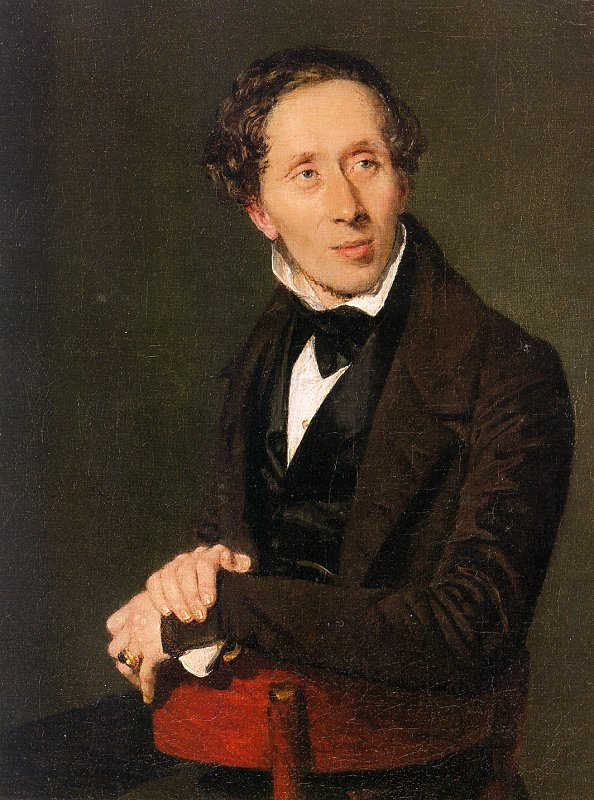
- Andersen in 1836
- Author: Hans Christian Andersen
- Original title: Eventyr, fortalte for Børn. Ny Samling
- Language: Danish
- Genre: Literary fairy tale
- Publisher: C. A. Reitzel
- Publication date: 2 October 1838 – 20 December 1841
- Publication place: Denmark
- Media type: Print; Fairy tale collection

Fairy Tales Told for Children. New Collection (Danish: Eventyr, fortalte for Børn. Ny Samling) is a collection of ten fairy tales by Hans Christian Andersen. The tales were published in a series of three installments by C. A. Reitzel in Copenhagen, Denmark between October 1838 and December 1841.

== Contents ==
=== Fairy Tales Told for Children. New Collection. First Booklet ===
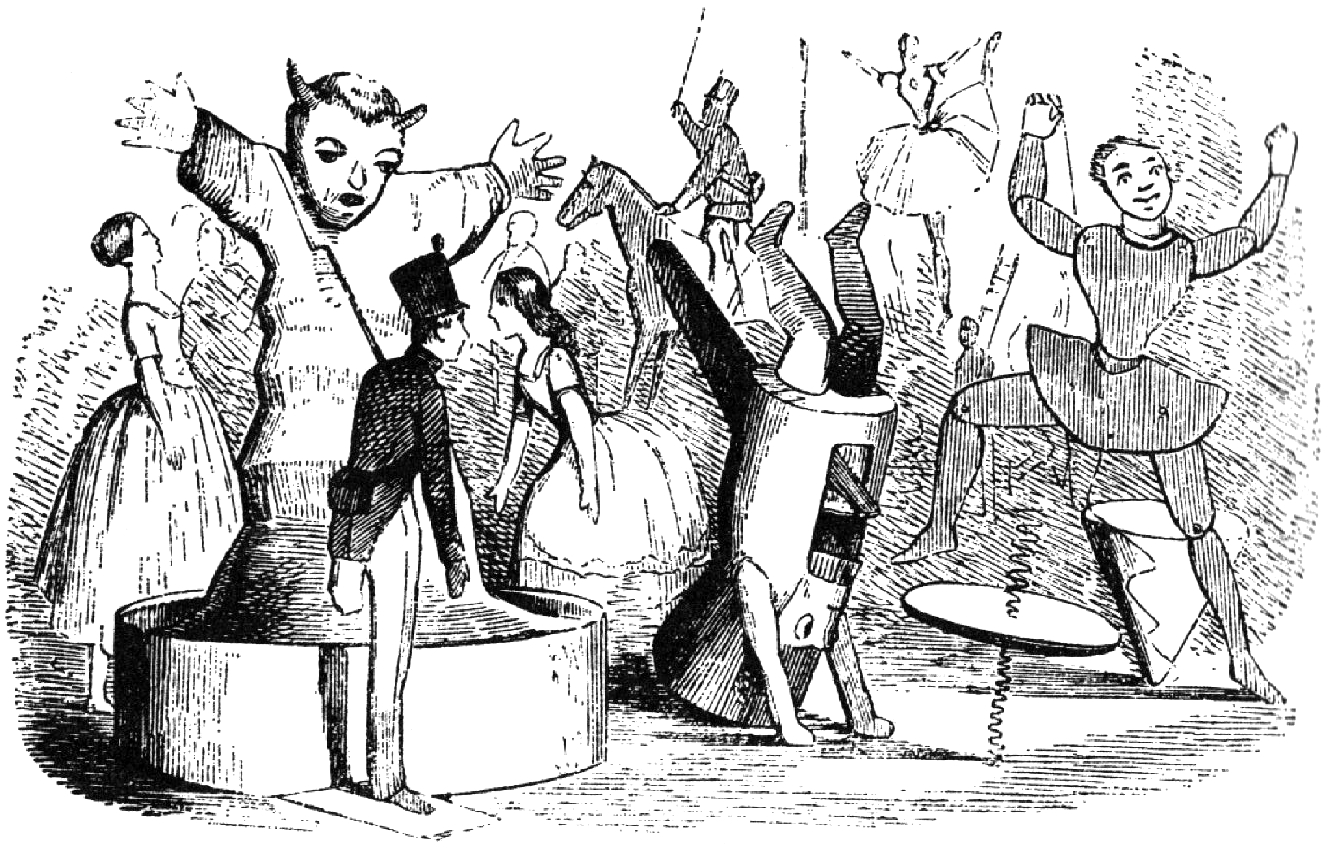
"The Steadfast Tin Soldier" illustration by Vilhelm Pedersen, Andersen‘s first illustrator (1850)

Fairy Tales Told for Children. New Collection. First Booklet (Eventyr, fortalte for Børn. Ny Samling. Første Hefte) is the first installment. It was published on 2 October 1838 and contained three tales:

- "The Daisy" ("Gåseurten") tells of happy little daisy who is taken up with a plot of earth to line the bottom of a bird cage where a lark is held captive. When the lark dies and is given an elaborate funeral by the children, the daisy is cast into the road and forgotten. She alone loved the lark, took joy in his song, and felt his suffering as her own.
- "The Steadfast Tin Soldier" ("Den standhaftige tinsoldat") is the story of a tin soldier who loves a paper ballerina. He falls from the parlor window, and, after sailing in a paper boat down a storm drain, is swallowed by a fish. Eventually he is returned to the parlor table where the ballerina still stands. A boy throws the soldier into the fire and a draught carries the ballerina to his side. They perish together; he is melted into a tin heart.
- "The Wild Swans" ("De vilde svaner"), a mute princess undergoes dreadful trials in order to free her eleven brothers from a spell cast by an evil queen. When suspicions are aroused that she is a witch, she is sentenced to death but rescues her brothers at the last moment. Now able to speak, she tells her story and the king marries her.

=== Fairy Tales Told for Children. New Collection. Second Booklet ===
Fairy Tales Told for Children. New Collection. Second Booklet (Eventyr, fortalte for Børn. Ny Samling. Andet Hefte) is the second installment. Was published on 19 October 1839 and contained three tales:

- "The Garden of Paradise" ("Paradisets have")
- "The Flying Trunk" ("Den flyvende Kuffert")
- "The Storks" ("Storkene")

=== Fairy Tales Told for Children. New Collection. Third Booklet ===
Fairy Tales Told for Children. New Collection. Third Booklet (Eventyr, fortalte for Børn. Ny Samling. Tredie Hefte) is the third and last installment. Was published on 20 December 1841 and contained four tales:

- "Ole Lukoie" ("Ole Lukøje")
- "The Rose Elf" ("Rosen-Alfen")
- "The Swineherd" ("Svinedrengen")
- "The Buckwheat" ("Boghveden")
