= Emily Lee Sherwood Ragan =

American author, journalist

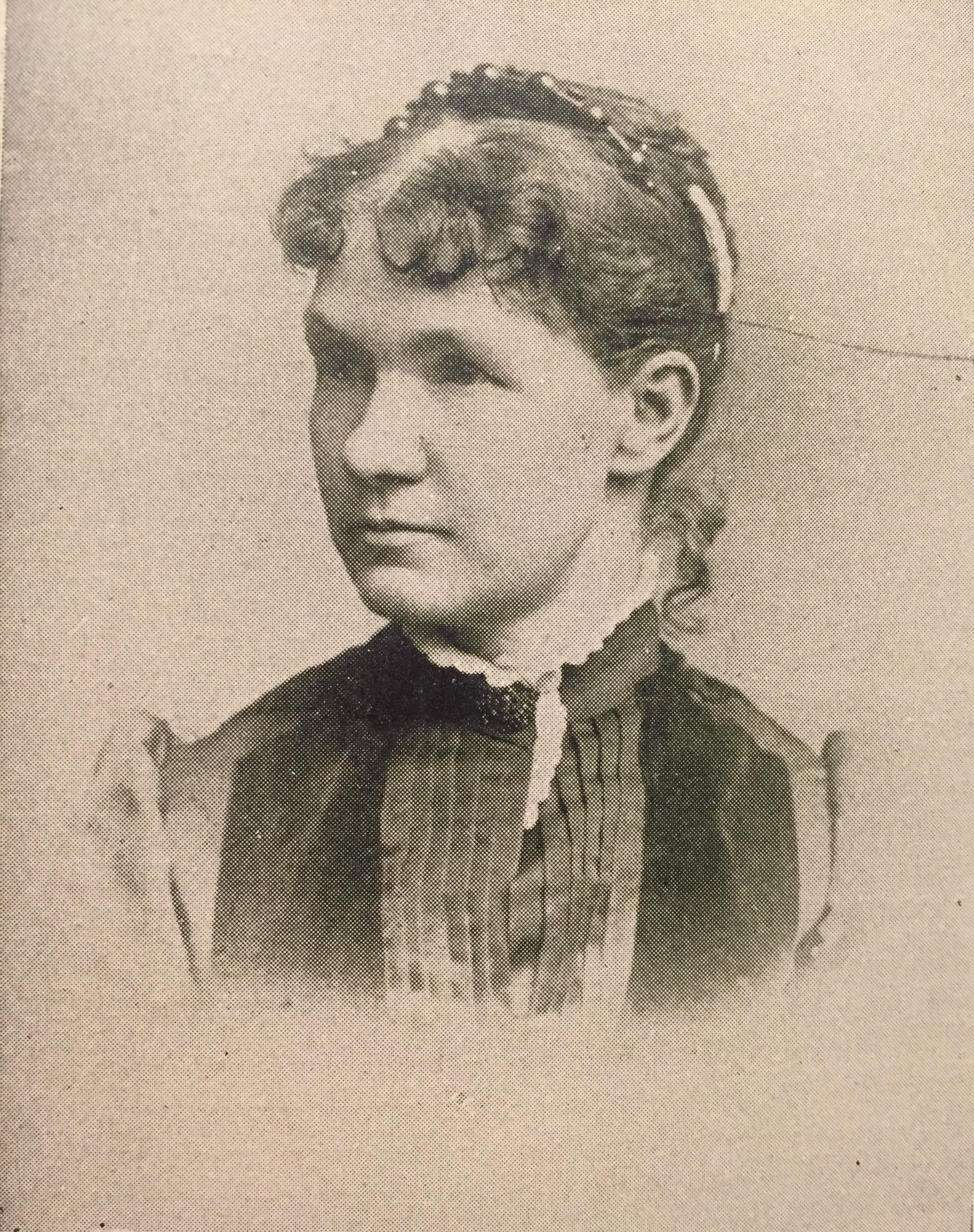
- "A Woman of the Century"
- Born: Emily Lee; March 28, 1839; Madison, Indiana, U.S.
- Died: April 19, 1916 (aged 77); Washington, D.C., U.S.
- Occupations: author; journalist
- Spouses: Henry Lee Sherwood (m. 1859–1894); William Henry Ragan (m. 1901–1909)
- Writing career
- Pen name: "Jennie Crayon"; "E. L. S."

Emily Lee Sherwood Ragan (née, Lee; after first marriage, Sherwood; after second marriage, Ragan; pen names, Jennie Crayon, E. L. S., Mrs. E. L. Sherwood; March 28, 1839 – April 19, 1916) was an American author and journalist. She was engaged in journalism in Washington, D.C., 1888–1900, and was also a contributor to other papers and magazines. By 1899, she engaged as special writer and searcher of Library of Congress. Ragan served as press superintendent of the Woman's Christian Temperance Union (WCTU) of D. C.; and president of the board of directors of the Women's Clinic. Ragan was a charter member of the National Society of the Daughters of the American Revolution (D.A.R.); and was the corresponding secretary for eighteen years of the Woman's Universalist Missionary Society, then known as Women's Centenary Association. Ragan favored woman suffrage. She was the author of Willis Peyton's Inheritance, 1889; and collaborator with Mary Smith Lockwood in preparing and publishing The Story of the Records (history of the founding and growth of the D.A.R.).

== Early years and education ==
Emily Lee was born in Madison, Indiana, March 28, 1839. (Note: Willard & Livermore (1893) gave year of birth as 1843.) where she spent her early girlhood. Her father, Monroe Wells Lee, was born in Ohio, and her mother was from Massachusetts. Mr. Lee, who was an architect and builder, died when his daughter was ten years old.

Ragan's early education was received in a private school, and later she took the educational course in the public and high schools of her native town.

== Career ==
At the age of sixteen, she entered the office of her brother. Manderville G. Lee, who published the Herald and Era, a religious weekly paper in Indianapolis, Indiana. There, she did whatever work she found to be done in the editorial rooms of a family newspaper, conducting the children's department and acquiring day by day a knowledge and discipline in business methods and newspaper work that fitted her for the labors of journalism and literature.

On October 19, 1859, in Indianapolis, she married Henry Lee Sherwood, a young attorney of Indianapolis, and first lieutenant of the Twelfth Ohio Volunteer Infantry. They removed to Washington, D.C., residing in a suburban home upon Anacostia Heights. After his death on December 3, 1894, she was left a widow, dependent upon her own efforts.

Sherwood sent out letters, stories and miscellaneous articles to various publications, some of which were the Indianapolis Daily Commercial, Star in the West, Forney's Sunday Chronicle, Ladies' Repository, Christian Leader, Santa Barbara Press, as well as a number of church papers. Those articles were signed with her own name, her initials of "E. L. S.", or the pen name "Jennie Crayon."

In 1888, Ragan was a delegate to the first International Woman's Council ever assembled. In 1889, she began a career as a journalist and accepted an appointment upon the staff of the Sunday Herald, of Washington, D.C. She also served similarly on the Daily Capitol, and contributed numerous illustrated articles to the Evening Star and occasionally The Washington Post. In addition to her regular work upon the Herald, she wrote for other local journals and the New York City newspapers, such as The New York Sun. She also served as special Washington correspondent of the New York World. As Ragan was an all-round writer, she also published books, reviews, stories, character sketches, society notes and reports. She published a novel, Willis Peyton's Inheritance (Boston, 1889), which was set in Washington.

In 1890, she was among the eighteen original organizers of the Daughters of the American Revolution and collaborated with Mary Smith Lockwood in the Story of the Records of the Daughters of the American Revolution. In 1893, in Chicago, she was a member of the advisory board of the Church Congress held during the World's Columbian Exposition.

Ragan was a member of the American Society of Authors, of New York City, the National Press League, the Woman's Press Guild, and the Triennial Council of Women. She was also one of those by whose efforts the First Universalist Church was established in Washington, and for seventeen years, she was secretary of the Woman's National Missionary Society. During the Spanish–American War, she was actively engaged in the work of the soldiers' rest rooms at 1204 Pennsylvania Avenue and was one of the charter members of the Mary A. Babcock Auxiliary, No. 1. She was associated and actively engaged in the Woman's Christian Temperance Union, the Federation of Women's Clubs, and for twenty years, was president of the woman's clinic. On September 10, 1901, she married William Henry Ragan, of the Agricultural Department, widely known as an authority on pomology; he died August 6, 1909.

== Later years ==
The last work of her life was that of the Legion of Loyal Women in their efforts to raise a suitable memorial to Clara Barton. Ragan was a charter member of the Clara Barton Memorial Association. Ragan died in Washington, D.C., on April 19, 1916. During the Twenty-fifth Continental Congress, she was included in the memorial services held at that time. She was given the honor of burial in Arlington National Cemetery.

== Selected works ==
=== By Emily L. Sherwood ===
- Willis Peyton's Inheritance, 1889

=== By Mary S. Lockwood & Emily Lee Sherwood (Mrs. W. H. Ragan) ===
- Story of the records, D.A.R., 1906

=== By Emily Lee Sherwood ===
- Character sketches of the pioneers of the Women's Centenary Association, 1910
