= 1921 in literature =

This article contains information about the literary events and publications of 1921.

== Events ==
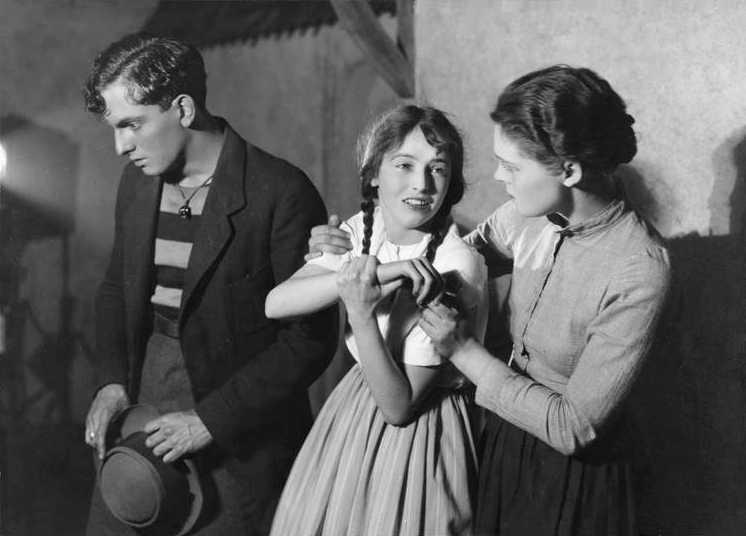
Joseph Schildkraut (Liliom), Evelyn Chard (Louise) and Eva Le Gallienne (Julie) in the 1921 Theatre Guild production of Liliom

- January 1 – The publishing firm Jonathan Cape is founded in Bloomsbury, London, by Herbert Jonathan Cape and Wren Howard.
- February – Margaret Caroline Anderson and Jane Heap, publishers of The Little Review, are convicted of obscenity in a New York court for publishing the "Nausicaa" episode of James Joyce's Ulysses.
- March – Jorge Luis Borges returns to his native Buenos Aires in Argentina after a period living with his family in Europe.
- April 20 – The Hungarian Ferenc Molnár's play Liliom is first produced on Broadway in English.
- May 9 – The première of Luigi Pirandello's Six Characters in Search of an Author (Sei personaggi in cerca d'autore) at the Teatro Valle in Rome divides the audience.
- May – A production of Pericles, Prince of Tyre directed by Robert Atkins at The Old Vic, London, restores the unexpurgated text for the first time since Shakespeare's day.
- June 6 – The première of Tristan Tzara's parodic The Gas Heart (Le Cœur à gaz) takes place at a Dada Salon at the Galerie Montaigne in Paris. It provokes audience derision.
- June 10 – D. H. Lawrence's novel Women in Love is first published commercially by Martin Secker in London.
- September 5 – The Cervantes Theatre (Buenos Aires) opens with a production of Lope de Vega's La dama boba (The Foolish Lady, 1613).
- September 26 – The Maddermarket Theatre in Norwich, England, an old chapel, is turned into an English Renaissance theatre for period drama by an amateur repertory company directed by Walter Nugent Monck. It opens with As You Like It.
- December 9 – John William Gott becomes the last person in England imprisoned for blasphemous libel.
- December 31 – Mexican poet Manuel Maples Arce distributes the first Stridentist manifesto, Comprimido estridentista, in the broadsheet Actual No. 1 in Mexico City.

== New books ==
=== Fiction ===
- Elizabeth von Arnim – Vera
- Ryūnosuke Akutagawa – "Autumn Mountain" (秋山, Akiyama)
- Edgar Rice Burroughs – Tarzan the Terrible
- Karel Čapek – Trapné povídky (Embarrassing Stories, translated as Money and other stories)
- Mary Cholmondeley – The Romance of His Life and Other Romances
- Walter de la Mare – Memoirs of a Midget
- Ethel M. Dell - The Obstacle Race
- Mary Frances Dowdall – Three Loving Ladies
- Edna Ferber - The Girls
- Fran Saleški Finžgar – Pod svobodnim soncem (Under the free sun)
- F. Scott Fitzgerald – The Beautiful and Damned (serialized in Metropolitan Magazine (New York))
- Mikkjel Fønhus – Troll-Elgen
- John Galsworthy – To Let (last book of The Forsyte Saga)
- H. Rider Haggard – She and Allan
- A. P. Herbert – The House by the River
- Georgette Heyer – The Black Moth
- E. M. Hull – The Shadow of the East
- A. S. M. Hutchinson – If Winter Comes
- Aldous Huxley – Crome Yellow
- Frigyes Karinthy – Capillaria
- Sheila Kaye-Smith – Joanna Godden
- Gaston Leroux – The Crime of Rouletabille
- Marie Belloc Lowndes – What Timmy Did
- Denis Mackail – Romance to the Rescue
- Compton Mackenzie – Rich Relatives
- René Maran – Batouala
- L. M. Montgomery – Rilla of Ingleside
- George Moore – Heloise and Abelard
- Paul Morand – Tender Shoots (Tendres stocks, short stories)
- E. Phillips Oppenheim – Jacob's Ladder
- Baroness Orczy
  - Castles in the Air (short stories)
  - The First Sir Percy
- Alejandro Pérez Lugín – Currito of the Cross (Currito de la Cruz)
- Gene Stratton Porter – Her Father's Daughter
- Marcel Proust
  - The Guermantes Way (Le Côté de Guermantes II, second part of vol. 3 of In Search of Lost Time)
  - Sodom and Gomorrah (Sodome et Gomorrhe I, first part of vol. 4 of In Search of Lost Time)
- Sukumar Ray – HaJaBaRaLa
- Iñigo Ed. Regalado – May Pagsinta'y Walang Puso
- Dorothy Richardson - Deadlock
- Berta Ruck - Sweet Stranger
- Rafael Sabatini – Scaramouche
- Naoya Shiga – A Dark Night's Passing (暗夜行路, An'ya Kōro; serialized 1921–37)
- May Sinclair - Mr. Waddington of Wyck
- Annie M. Smithson - Carmen Cavanagh
- Booth Tarkington – Alice Adams
- Aleksey Nikolayevich Tolstoy – The Road to Calvary (publication begins)
- Sigrid Undset – Husfrue (The Wife or The Mistress of Husaby, second part of Kristin Lavransdatter)
- Edgar Wallace
  - The Book of All Power
  - The Law of the Four Just Men
- Eugene Walter – The Byzantine Riddle and other stories
- Arthur Weigall – Burning Sands
- Virginia Woolf – Monday or Tuesday
- Elinor Wylie – Nets to Catch the Wind
- Francis Brett Young
  - The Black Diamond
  - The Red Knight
- Yevgeny Zamyatin – We (Мы; completed)

=== Children and young people ===
- Dorita Fairlie Bruce – The Senior Prefect (later entitled Dimsie Goes to School)
- Eleanor Farjeon – Martin Pippin in the Apple Orchard
- Charles Boardman Hawes – The Great Quest
- Hendrik Willem van Loon – The Story of Mankind (non-fiction)
- Else Ury – Nesthäkchen Flies From the Nest

=== Drama ===
- Hjalmar Bergman – Farmor och vår Herre (Grandmother and Our Lord, translated as Thy Rod and Thy Staff)
- Dorothy Brandon – Araminta Arrives
- Karel Čapek – R.U.R. (Rossum's Universal Robots) (performed)
- Karel and Josef Čapek – Pictures from the Insects' Life (Ze života hmyzu, published)
- Clemence Dane – A Bill of Divorcement
- Brandon Fleming – The Eleventh Commandment
- Gerald du Maurier – Bulldog Drummond (with H.C. McNeile)
- Susan Glaspell – Inheritors (written) and The Verge (performed)
- Ian Hay – A Safety Match
- A. de Herz – Mărgeluș (Tiny Bead)
- Avery Hopwood – The Demi-Virgin
- A. A. Milne – The Truth About Blayds
- René Morax – Le Roi David
- Roland Pertwee – Out to Win
- Luigi Pirandello – Six Characters in Search of an Author
- Sophie Treadwell - Rights
- Tristan Tzara – The Gas Heart
- Edgar Wallace – M'Lady
- Raden Adipati Aria Muharam Wiranatakusumah – Lutung Kasarung
- Stanisław Ignacy Witkiewicz – The Water Hen (Kurka Wodna)

=== Poetry ===
- Robert Frost – Mountain Interval (second print)
- Langston Hughes – "The Negro Speaks of Rivers", in The Crisis
- Amy Lowell - Legends
- Katherine Tynan - The Handsome Brandons
- William Carlos Williams – Sour Grapes
- William Butler Yeats – Michael Robartes and the Dancer

=== Non-fiction ===
- Adolphe Appia – L'Œuvre d'art vivant (The Living Work of Art)
- Charles Bean (ed.) – Official History of Australia in the War of 1914–1918, vol. 1
- Joseph Chaikov – Skulptur (first Yiddish-language work on the subject)
- Grace King– Creole Families of New Orleans
- Frank H. Knight – Risk, Uncertainty, and Profit
- D. H. Lawrence
  - Sea and Sardinia
  - (as Lawrence H. Davison) – Movements in European History
- North-West Frontier Province – Administration Report of the North-west Frontier Province for 1922-23
- Edward Sapir – Language: an introduction to the study of speech
- Eugen von Böhm-Bawerk – Further Essays on Capital and Interest
- Ludwig Wittgenstein – Tractatus Logico-Philosophicus
- Zitkala-Sa – American Indian Stories

== Births ==
- January 5 – Friedrich Dürrenmatt, Swiss writer (died 1990)
- January 19 – Patricia Highsmith, American crime writer (died 1995)
- January 21 – Charles Eric Maine, English science fiction writer (died 1981)
- February 4 – Betty Friedan, American feminist author (died 2006)
- February 5 – Marion Eames, Welsh novelist writing mainly in Welsh (died 2007)
- February 15 – Radha Krishna Choudhary, Indian historian and writer (died 1985)
- March 1 – Richard Wilbur, American poet and translator (died 2017)
- March 3 – Paul Guimard, French novelist (died 2004)
- March 24 – Wilson Harris, Guyanese-born poet, novelist and essayist (died 2018)
- April 21 – Angela Bianchini, Italian fiction writer and literary critic (died 2018)
- May 20 – Wolfgang Borchert, German author and playwright (died 1947)
- May 23
  - James Blish, American science fiction author (died 1975)
  - Ray Lawler, Australian dramatist (died 2024)
- May 29
  - Mona Van Duyn, American poet (died 2004)
  - Henry Scholberg, American bibliographer (died 2012)
- June 11 – Michael Meyer, English translator and biographer (died 2000)
- June 12 – Christopher Derrick, English author, critic, and academic (died 2007)
- June 14 – John Bradburne, English poet and missionary (killed 1979)
- August 11 – Alex Haley, American writer (died 1992)
- August 17 – Elinor Lyon, British children's writer (died 2008)
- August 18 – Frédéric Jacques Temple, French poet and writer (died 2020)
- August 25 – Brian Moore, Northern Irish-Canadian writer (died 1999)
- September 12 – Stanisław Lem, Polish science fiction novelist, philosopher, satirist and physician (died 2006)
- September 15 – Richard Gordon, English author (died 2017)
- September 16 – Mohamed Talbi, Tunisian historian (died 2017)
- September 26 – Cyprian Ekwensi, Nigerian writer (died 2007)
- October 2 – Edmund Crispin (Robert Bruce Montgomery), English crime writer (died 1978)
- October 9 – Tadeusz Różewicz, Polish poet, dramatist and writer (died 2014)
- October 10 – James Clavell, Australian-born British novelist (died 1994)
- October 17 – George Mackay Brown, Scottish poet (died 1996)
- November 6 – James Jones, American novelist (died 1977)
- November 22 – Brian Cleeve, Irish author (died 2003)
- December 20 – Israil Bercovici, Romanian dramatist and historian (died 1988)

== Deaths ==
- February 6 – Abba Goold Woolson, American author and poet (born 1838)
- February 17 – Rosetta Luce Gilchrist, American physician, author (born 1850)
- February 24 – John Habberton, American critic (born 1842)
- March 22 – E. W. Hornung, English author (born 1866)
- April 6 – Maximilian Berlitz, German-born American textbook writer and language school proprietor (born 1852)
- May 5 – Alfred Hermann Fried, Austrian publicist (born 1864)
- May 12 – Emilia Pardo Bazán, Spanish novelist (born 1851)
- May 13 – Jean Aicard, French writer (born 1848)
- June – N. D. Popescu-Popnedea, Romanian novelist, folklorist, archivist and almanac compiler (born 1843)
- June 5 – Georges Feydeau, French playwright (born 1862)
- June 18 – Eduardo Acevedo Díaz, Uruguayan writer (born 1851)
- June 20 – Mary Lynde Craig, American writer, teacher, attorney, activist (born 1834)
- June 26 – Alfred Percy Sinnett, English Theosophist author (born 1840)
- July 4 – Antoni Grabowski, Polish Esperantist (born 1857)
- July 7 – Luca Caragiale, Romanian poet, novelist and translator (pneumonia, born 1893)
- August 1 – Helen Vickroy Austin, American journalist and horticulturist (born 1829)
- August 7 – Alexander Blok, Russian poet (born 1880)
- August 8 – Juhani Aho, Finnish author and journalist (born 1861)
- August 19 – Georges Darien, French anarchist writer (born 1862)
- August 25 – Nikolay Gumilev, Russian poet (executed, born 1886)
- September 3 - Maria I. Johnston, American author, journalist, editor and lecturer (born 1835)
- September 22 - Ivan Vazov, Bulgarian poet, novelist and playwright (born 1850)
- September 26 – Matei Donici, Bessarabian Romanian poet and professional soldier (born 1847)
- October 1 – Lillian Rozell Messenger, American poet (born 1843)
- October 10 – Otto von Gierke, German historian (born 1841)
- November 1 – Sarah Dyer Hobart, American author of poetry, prose, and songs (born 1845/46)
- November 8 – Pavol Országh Hviezdoslav, Slovak poet, dramatist and translator (born 1849)
- November 14 – Christabel Rose Coleridge, English novelist and editor (born 1843)
- December 28 – Hester A. Benedict, American poet (born 1838)
- date unknown
  - Emma Churchman Hewitt, American author and journalist (born 1850)
  - Della Campbell MacLeod, American author and journalist (born ca. 1884)

== Awards ==
- James Tait Black Memorial Prize for fiction: Walter de la Mare, Memoirs of a Midget
- James Tait Black Memorial Prize for biography: Lytton Strachey, Queen Victoria
- Nobel Prize in Literature: Anatole France
- Pulitzer Prize for Drama: Zona Gale, Miss Lulu Bett
- Pulitzer Prize for Poetry: no award given
- Pulitzer Prize for the Novel: Edith Wharton, The Age of Innocence
