= 1843 in literature =

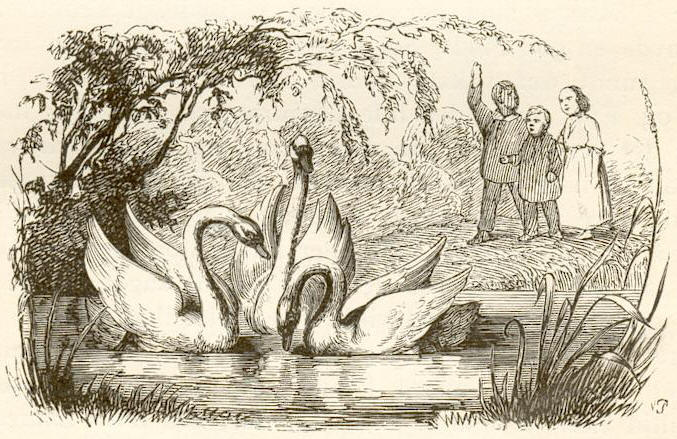
Vilhelm Pedersen illustration for The Ugly Duckling in public domain.

This article contains information about the literary events and publications of 1843.

== Events ==
- January
  - Serial publication begins of Charles Dickens' picaresque novel The Life and Adventures of Martin Chuzzlewit by Chapman & Hall in London. The novel was published in 19 monthly instalments, each comprising 32 pages of text and two illustrations by Phiz. Each instalment had a cost of one shilling. The last part was double-length. Dickens responded to the disappointing early sales of the monthly parts, when compared to the sales of previous works as monthly instalments; he changed the plot to send the title character to the United States. Dickens's satire of American modes and manners in the novel won him no friends on the other side of the Atlantic Ocean, where the instalments containing the offending chapters were greeted with a "frenzy of wrath". As a consequence, Dickens received abusive mail and newspaper clippings from the United States.
  - Edgar Allan Poe's Gothic short story "The Tell-Tale Heart" appears in The Pioneer in Boston and his poem "The Conqueror Worm" in Graham's Magazine in Philadelphia. "The Conqueror Worm" uses the word "evermore", which would later evolve into "nevermore" in Poe's famous poem "The Raven" in 1845.
- February – Macmillan Publishers is founded in London by the Scottish brothers Daniel and Alexander Macmillan.
- April 4 – William Wordsworth accepts the office of Poet Laureate of the United Kingdom, after the death of Robert Southey on March 21. He is reassured that it is seen as a purely honorific position.
- June 21 – Edgar Allan Poe's short story "The Gold-Bug" begins to be serialized in the Philadelphia Dollar Newspaper as the winning entry in a competition, earning Poe a $100 prize. It will be widely reprinted and adapted for theater. It popularizes cryptography.
- July – Margaret Fuller's "The Great Lawsuit. Man versus Men. Woman versus Women" appears in The Dial magazine in the United States. It will later be expanded into a book, Woman in the Nineteenth Century (1845).
- August 19 – Edgar Allan Poe's Gothic short story "The Black Cat" is first published in The Saturday Evening Post.
- August 22 – The Theatres Act in the United Kingdom ends a virtual monopoly of theatrical performances held by the patent theatres and encourages development of popular entertainment.
- September – Ada Lovelace (Byron's daughter) translates and expands Menabrea's notes on Charles Babbage's analytical engine, including an algorithm for calculating a sequence of Bernoulli numbers, seen as the world's first computer program.
- October – Anna Atkins begins publishing Photographs of British Algae: Cyanotype Impressions, a collection of contact printed cyanotype photograms of algae, to form the first book illustrated with photographs.
- December 17 – Publication of Charles Dickens' novella A Christmas Carol. In Prose. Being a Ghost Story of Christmas by Chapman & Hall is made at his expense. It introduces the character Ebenezer Scrooge. Released on December 19, the first printing sells out by Christmas Eve.
- Christmas – Thomas Hood's poem "The Song of the Shirt" appears in Punch.
- unknown dates
  - The Routledge publishing firm is founded in London by the Cumberland-born bookseller George Routledge.
  - The steam-powered rotary printing press is invented by Richard March Hoe in the United States.

== New books ==
=== Fiction ===
- William Harrison Ainsworth – Windsor Castle
- Edward Bulwer-Lytton – The Last of the Barons
- James Fenimore Cooper – Le Mouchoir; an Autobiographical Romance
- Charles Dickens
  - A Christmas Carol
  - Martin Chuzzlewit
- Alexandre Dumas, père – Georges
- Catherine Gore – The Banker's Wife
- Léon Gozlan – Aristide Froissart
- Victor Hugo – Les Burgraves
- Søren Kierkegaard – Diary of a Seducer (literary novel included in Either/Or)
- John Neal — Ruth Elder
- Frederick Marryat – Monsieur Violet
- Eugène Sue – The Mysteries of Paris
- Robert Smith Surtees – Handley Cross
- Claude Tillier – My Uncle Benjamin
- Charlotte Elizabeth Tonna – Perils of the Nation
- Frances Milton Trollope – The Barnabys in America

=== Children and young people ===
- Hans Christian Andersen – New Fairy Tales. First Volume. First Collection (Nye Eventyr. Første Bind. Første Samling) comprising "The Angel" ("Engelen"), "The Nightingale" ("Nattergalen"), "The Sweethearts; or, The Top and the Ball" ("Kjærestefolkene [Toppen og bolden]") and "The Ugly Duckling" ("Den grimme ælling")

=== Drama ===
- Eusebio Asquerino – Casada, vírgen y mártir
- V. A. Bhave – Sita Swayamvar
- Théophile Gautier – Un Voyage en Espagne
- Nikolai Gogol – The Gamblers
- James Sheridan Knowles – The Secretary
- W. T. Moncrieff – The Scamps of London

=== Poetry ===
- Thomas Hood – "The Song of the Shirt"
- Richard Henry Horne – Orion: an epic poem
- Edgar Allan Poe – "The Conqueror Worm"

=== Non-fiction ===
- Leon Battista Alberti – I Libri della famiglia
- Anna Atkins – Photographs of British Algae: Cyanotype Impressions
- Paul Rudolf von Bilguer – Handbuch des Schachspiels (Handbook of Chess)
- George Borrow – The Bible in Spain; or, the Journey, Adventures, and Imprisonment of an English-man in an Attempt to Circulate the Scriptures in the Peninsula
- James Braid – Neurypnology: or the Rationale of Nervous Sleep
- Thomas Carlyle – Past and Present
- Marquis de Custine – La Russie en 1839 (Russia in 1839)
- Benjamin Hall Kennedy – Elementary Latin Primer
- Søren Kierkegaard (as Johannes de Silentio) – Fear and Trembling (Frygt og Bæven)
- Charles Robert Leslie – Memoirs of the Life of John Constable
- Thomas Babington Macaulay – Critical and Historical Essays
- Moses Margoliouth – The Fundamental Principles of Modern Judaism Investigated
- John Stuart Mill – A System of Logic
- William H. Prescott – History of the Conquest of Mexico
- John Ruskin – Modern Painters, vol. 1
- Rev. J. M. Wainwright – Book of Common Prayer (1843 illustrated version)
- Wei Yuan and others (comp.) – Illustrated Treatise on the Maritime Kingdoms (海國圖志, Hǎiguó Túzhì)

== Births ==
- January 2 – Gabriel Compayré, French scholar and politician (died 1913)
- January 14 – Hans Forssell, Swedish historian (died 1901)
- January 17 – Florence Montgomery, English novelist and children's writer (died 1923)
- January 24 – Evald Tang Kristensen, Danish author and collector of folklore (died 1929)
- January 28 – Mihkel Veske, Estonian poet and linguist (died 1890)
- February 6 – Frederic W. H. Myers, British poet (died 1901)
- February 24
  - Teófilo Braga, Portuguese poet, playwright and politician (died 1924)
  - Violet Fane (Mary Montgomerie Lamb), English novelist, poet and essayist (died 1905)
- March 5 – Hugh Antoine d'Arcy, French writer (died 1925)
- March 11 – Harald Høffding, Danish philosopher and theologian (died 1931)
- March 29 – Paul Ferrier, French dramatist and librettist (died 1920)
- March 30 – Florence Ashton Marshall, English composer and conductor, biographer of Handel (died 1922)
- April 15
  - Elizabeth Boynton Harbert, American author, reformer, and philanthropist (died 1915)
  - Henry James, American-born fiction writer (died 1916)
- April 25 – Constance Cary Harrison, American playwright and novelist (died 1920)
- April 29 – Pedro Américo, Brazilian novelist, poet, scientist, artist, essayist, philosopher, politician and professor (died 1905)
- May 3 – Edward Dowden, Irish poet and critic (died 1913)
- May 10 – Benito Pérez Galdós, Spanish novelist (died 1920)
- May 12 – Thomas William Rhys Davids, British linguist and scholar (died 1922)
- May 25 – Christabel Rose Coleridge, English novelist and editor (died 1921)
- June 9 – Bertha von Suttner, Austrian pacifist writer (died 1914)
- June 26 – Paul Arène, French poet and author (died 1896)
- July 5 – Mandell Creighton, English bishop and historian (died 1901)
- August 9 – N. D. Popescu-Popnedea, Romanian novelist, folklorist, archivist and almanac compiler (died 1921)
- September 26 – James Rice, English novelist (died 1882)
- October 25 – Gleb Uspensky, Russian writer (died 1902)
- November – Lucy M. Hall, American physician and writer (died 1907)
- December 7 – Helena Nyblom, née Roed, Danish-born poet and writer of fairy tales (died 1926)
- December 10 – Isabella Fyvie Mayo, Scottish poet, novelist, and reformer (died 1914)
- December 21 – Thomas Bracken, Irish-born New Zealand poet (died 1898)
- December 23 – Ada Langworthy Collier, American author (died 1919)
- December 24 – Lydia Koidula, Estonian poet (died 1886)
- December 29 – Princess Elisabeth of Wied ("Carmen Sylva"), German-born queen consort and writer (died 1916)
- unknown dates
  - Mary Bathurst Deane, English novelist (died 1940)
  - Lillian Rozell Messenger, American poet (died 1921)

== Deaths ==
- January 11 – Francis Scott Key, American poet (born 1779)
- February 10 – Richard Carlile, English writer and agitator for suffrage and freedom of the press (born 1790)
- February 22 – Mary Hays, English feminist writer (born 1759)
- March 21 – Robert Southey, English poet and Poet Laureate (born 1774)
- May 12 – Charlotte von Kalb, German writer (born 1761)
- May 19 – Charles James Apperley ("Nimrod"), English sporting writer (born 1777)
- May 28 – Noah Webster, American lexicographer (born 1758)
- June 6 – Friedrich Hölderlin, German poet, novelist, and dramatist (born 1770)
- July 4 – John Basset, writer on Cornish mining (born 1791)
- July 9 – Karoline Pichler, Austrian novelist (born 1769)
- July 31 – William Thomas Lowndes, English bibliographer (born c.1798)
- August 10 – Jakob Friedrich Fries, German philosopher (born 1773)
- September 4 – Léopoldine Hugo, daughter of French novelist Victor Hugo (b. 1824)
- October 21 – William Pinnock, English writer, publisher and bookseller (born 1782)
- November 25 – Ellen Pickering, English novelist (born 1801 or 1802)
- November 28 – József Ficzkó, Burgenland Croatian writer (born 1772)
- December 11 – Casimir Delavigne, French poet and dramatist (born 1793)

== Awards ==
- Newdigate Prize – Matthew Arnold, "Cromwell"

== Sources ==
- Pearson, Hesketh (1949), Dickens, London: Methuen
