= Asquerino =

Asquerino is a surname of Spanish origin. Notable people with the surname include:

- Eduardo Asquerino (1826–1881), Spanish politician, journalist, author and poet
- Eusebio Asquerino (1822–1892), Spanish poet and playwright
- María Asquerino (1925–2013), Spanish actress
