= 1850 in literature =

This article contains information about the literary events and publications of 1850.

== Events ==
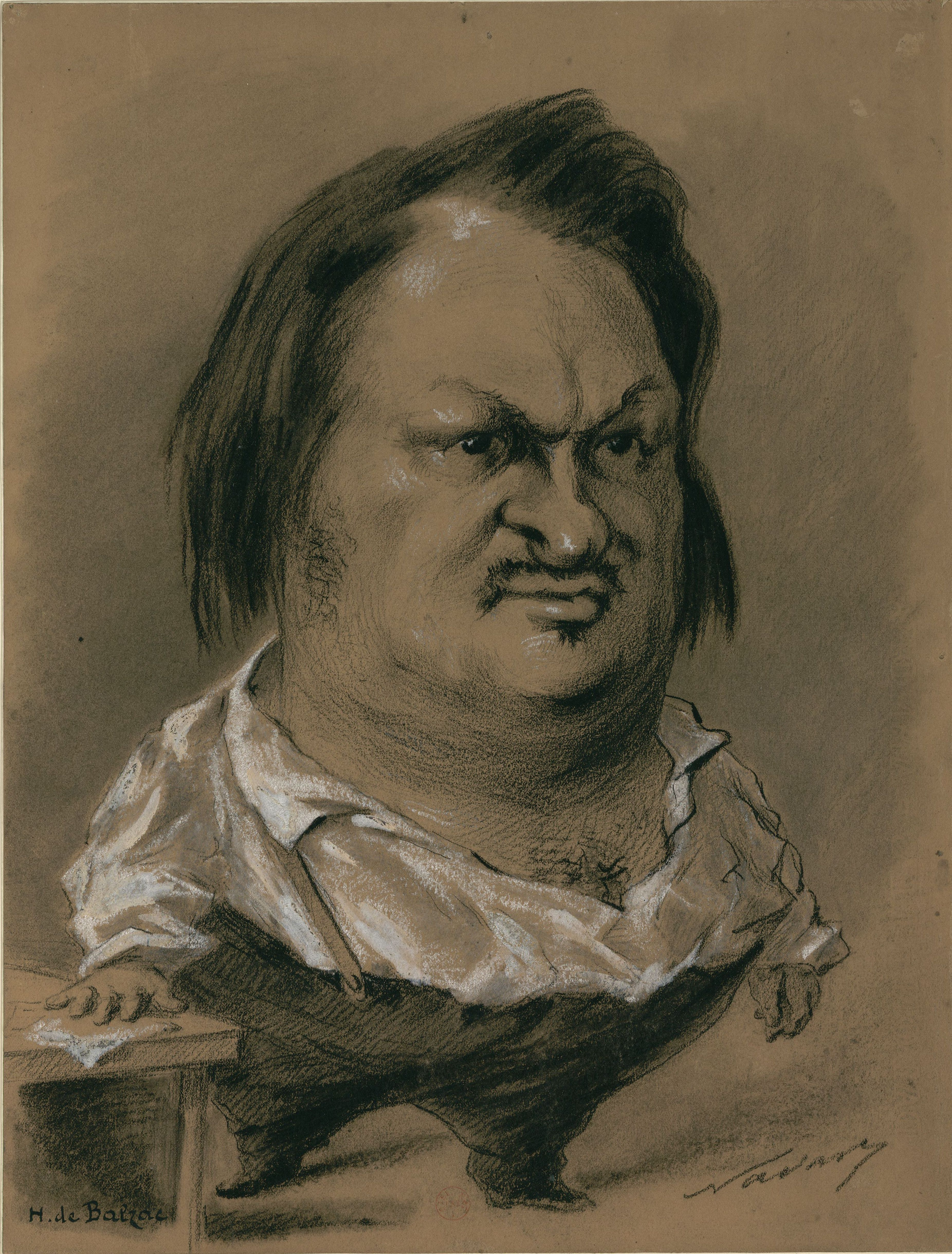
Balzac caricatured in the year of his death by Nadar

- January – The collected works of Edgar Allan Poe (died 1849) begin posthumous publication, co-edited by Rufus Wilmot Griswold. Later in the year, Griswold adds a memoir to the third volume, denigrating Poe's reputation, based partly on forged evidence.
- January–April – The Germ, a periodical of the Pre-Raphaelite Brotherhood edited by William Michael Rossetti, is published (four issues, the last two retitled Art and Poetry).The periodical was not a success, only surviving for four issues between January and April 1850.
- March – The weekly magazine Household Words, "conducted by Charles Dickens," begins publication in London. That Dickens owned half of the company and his agents, John Forster and William Henry Wills, owned a further quarter of it was insurance that the author would have a free hand in the paper. Wills was also appointed associate editor and, in December 1849, Dickens's acquaintance, writer and poet Richard Henry Horne was appointed sub-editor at a salary of "five guineas a week".The magazine continued until 1859, ending due to a dispute between Dickens and the publishers Bradbury and Evans over their refusal to print his "personal statement" regarding his divorce in their other magazine, Punch.
- March 14 – Honoré de Balzac marries Ewelina Hańska at Berdyczów. The marriage ended with his death only five months later. Both Hańska and Balzac took ill after their wedding; Hańska suffered from a severe attack of gout. She recovered, but her husband did not. They returned to Paris in late May, and Balzac's health improved slightly at the start of summer. By July, however, he was confined to his bed.In mid-August, Balzac succumbed to gangrene and began having fits of delirium. At one point, he called out for Horace Bianchon, the fictional doctor he had included in many novels.He died on 18 August 1850.
- March 16 – Nathaniel Hawthorne's historical novel The Scarlet Letter is published by William Ticknor and James T. Fields in Boston, Massachusetts, where it is set. It sells 2,500 copies in ten days. A second edition appears by the end of the month.
- May 1 – The earliest surviving mention of the composition of Moby-Dick appears in a letter Herman Melville writes to Richard Henry Dana Jr.
- May (late) – Alfred Tennyson's poem In Memoriam A.H.H., commemorating the death of his friend and fellow poet Arthur Hallam in 1833, is published by Edward Moxon in London. The writer's anonymity is broken on June 1 by The Publishers' Circular.
- June 13 – Alfred Tennyson marries his childhood friend Emily Sellwood at Shiplake.
- July – William Wordsworth's The Prelude; or, Growth of a Poet's Mind: An Autobiographical Poem, on which he has worked since 1798, is first published about three months after his death by Edward Moxon in London in 14 books, with the title supplied by the poet's widow, Mary.
- August 5 – Nathaniel Hawthorne and Herman Melville meet for the first time, together with Oliver Wendell Holmes Sr. and publisher James T. Fields, on a picnic expedition to Monument Mountain (Berkshire County, Massachusetts).
- September 26 – The first play by Henrik Ibsen to be performed, The Burial Mound (Kjæmpehøjen), opens at the Christiania Theatre under the pseudonym Brynjolf Bjarme. His first written play, Catiline, completed this year, will not be performed until 1881.
- November
  - A new edition of Elizabeth Barrett Browning's Poems is published by Chapman & Hall in London, including in volume 2 her Sonnets from the Portuguese, written during her courtship by Robert Browning in about 1845–1846. The most famous will be No. 43 ("How do I love thee? Let me count the ways.")
  - Salford Museum and Art Gallery opens as "The Royal Museum & Public Library", as England's first unconditionally free public library.
- November 1 – Charles Dickens's novel David Copperfield – The Personal History, Adventures, Experience and Observation of David Copperfield the Younger of Blunderstone Rookery (Which He Never Meant to Publish on Any Account) – concludes serial publication and on November 14 appears complete in book form from Bradbury and Evans in London.
- November 19 – Alfred Tennyson is named Poet Laureate of the United Kingdom in succession to William Wordsworth, but only after Samuel Rogers has declined the offer because of his age and Tennyson is assured that birthday odes will not be required of him.
- unknown date – Ivan Turgenev completes the writing of his play A Month in the Country («Месяц в деревне», Mesiats v derevne) as The Student in Paris, but it is rejected by the Saint Petersburg censor and will not be published until 1855 or performed until 1872.

== New books ==
=== Fiction ===
- Wilkie Collins – Antonina, or The Fall of Rome
- Charles Dickens – David Copperfield (complete in book form)
- Alexandre Dumas, fils – Tristan le Roux
- Alexandre Dumas, père – The Black Tulip (La Tulipe Noire)
- Nathaniel Hawthorne – The Scarlet Letter
- Caroline Lee Hentz
  - Linda
  - Rena, the Snowbird
- Jón Thoroddsen – Piltur og Stúlka (Boy and Girl, the first novel in Icelandic)
- Herman Melville – White-Jacket
- Alexei Pisemsky – The Simpleton («Тюфя′к», Tyufyak)
- James Malcolm Rymer and Thomas Peckett Prest (probable authors) – The String of Pearls (complete in book form; the first literary appearance of Sweeney Todd)
- Frank Smedley – Frank Fairleigh
- William Makepeace Thackeray – Pendennis (complete in book form)
- Ivan Turgenev – The Diary of a Superfluous Man («Дневник лишнего человека», Dnevnik lishnevo cheloveka)
- Jemima von Tautphoeus – The Initials
- Susan Warner (as Elizabeth Wetherell) – The Wide, Wide World

=== Drama ===
- Vasile Alecsandri – Chirița în Iași
- Christian Friedrich Hebbel – Herodes and Mariamne
- Paul Heyse – Francesca von Rimini
- Henrik Ibsen – The Burial Mound (Kjæmpehøjen)
- Alexander Ostrovsky – It's a Family Affair-We'll Settle It Ourselves («Свои люди», Svoi lyudi - sotchtemsya, originally Bankrut)
- Ivan Turgenev – A Month in the Country (written)

=== Poetry ===
- Elizabeth Barrett Browning – Sonnets from the Portuguese
- Robert Browning – Christmas-Eve and Easter-Day
- Alfred Tennyson – In Memoriam A.H.H.
- William Wordsworth – The Prelude

=== Non-fiction ===
- Ivar Aasen – Dictionary of the Norwegian Dialects (Ordbog over det Norske Folkesprog)
- Mary Anne Atwood – A Suggestive Inquiry into the Hermetic Mystery
- Frédéric Bastiat – The Law (La Loi)
- Thomas Carlyle – Latter-Day Pamphlets
- Ralph Waldo Emerson – Representative Men
- Friedrich Engels – The Peasant War in Germany (Der deutsche Bauernkrieg)
- Alexander Herzen – From Another Shore («С того берега», S togo berega)
- Washington Irving – Mahomet and His Successors
- Julia Kavanagh – Women in France during the Eighteenth Century
- Søren Kierkegaard (as Anti-Climacus) – Practice in Christianity (Indøvelse i Christendom)

== Births ==
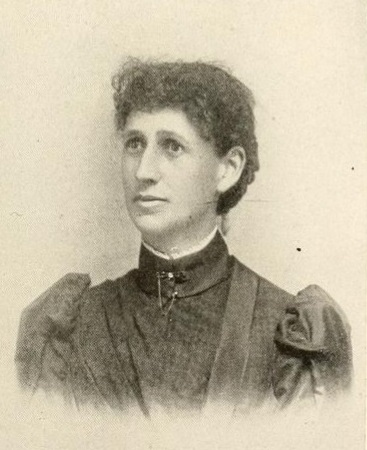
Rose Hartwick Thorpe

- January 14 – Pierre Loti, French novelist (died 1923)
- January 15 – Mihai Eminescu, Romanian poet, novelist and journalist (died 1889)
- January 24 – Mary Noailles Murfree, American novelist (died 1922)
- January 27 – John Collier, British writer and painter (died 1934)
- February 1 – Emma Churchman Hewitt, American author and journalist (died 1921)
- February 6 – Elizabeth Williams Champney, American author (died 1922)
- February 8 – Kate Chopin, American writer (died 1904)
- February 24 – Mary De Morgan, English children's writer and suffragist (died 1907)
- February 27 –Laura E. Richards, American author (died 1943)
- March 26 – Edward Bellamy, American Utopian novelist and socialist (died 1898)
- April 11 – Rosetta Luce Gilchrist, American physician, author (died 1921)
- April 12 – Agnes Catherine Maitland, English academic, novelist and cookery writer (died 1906)
- April 13 – Bernhard Alexander (Alexander Márkus), Hungarian philosopher and polymath (died 1927)
- April 16 – Auguste Groner, Austrian detective fiction writer (died 1929)
- April 30
  - Mrs. Alex. McVeigh Miller, American novelist (died 1937)
  - Ieronim Yasinsky, Russian novelist, poet, critic and essayist (died 1931)
- June 18
  - Cyrus H. K. Curtis, American publisher (died 1933)
  - Alice Moore McComas, American author, editor, lecturer and reformer (died 1919)
- June 27 – Lafcadio Hearn (Koizumi Yakumo), Greek-born Irish American scholar and writer on Japan (died 1904)
- July 2 – Dumitru C. Moruzi, Russian-born Romanian political figure and social novelist (died 1914)
- July 9 (June 27 O.S.) – Ivan Vazov, Bulgarian poet, novelist and playwright (died 1921)
- July 18 – Rose Hartwick Thorpe, American poet and author (died 1939)
- July 25 – Lydia J. Newcomb Comings, American author, educator, lecturer (died 1946)
- August 5 – Guy de Maupassant, French novelist and short story writer (died 1893)
- August 10 – Ella M. S. Marble, American physician (died 1929)
- August 30 – Marcelo H. del Pilar, Filipino writer, journalist and reformist leader (died 1896)
- September 2 – Eugene Field, American poet and essayist (died 1895)
- September 6 – Marion Howard Brazier, American journalist (died 1935)
- October 26 – Grigore Tocilescu, Romanian historian, archaeologist, epigrapher and folkorist, author of many books on ancient Dacia (died 1909)
- November 5 – Ella Wheeler Wilcox, American writer and poet (died 1919)
- November 13 – Robert Louis Stevenson, Scottish novelist, poet and travel writer (died 1894)
- December 23 – Louise Reed Stowell, American scientist, author (died 1932)
- Unknown date – Annie Armitt, English novelist and poet (died 1933)

== Deaths ==
- January 20 – Adam Oehlenschläger, Danish poet and dramatist (born 1779)
- April 7 – William Lisle Bowles, English poet and critic (born 1762)
- April 23 – William Wordsworth, English poet (born 1770)
- May 24 – Jane Porter, Scottish novelist and dramatist (born 1776)
- May 31 – Giuseppe Giusti, Italian poet (born 1809)
- July 6 – Alexander Jamieson, Scottish textbook writer, schoolmaster and rhetorician (born 1782)
- July 14 – August Neander, German theologian (born 1789)
- July 19 – Margaret Fuller, American journalist and critic (presumed drowned, born 1810)
- August 18 – Honoré de Balzac, French novelist (heart condition, born 1799)
- August 22 – Nikolaus Lenau (Nikolaus Franz Niembsch Edler von Strehlenau), Austrian poet (insanity, born 1802)
- November 4 – Gustav Schwab, German writer and publisher (born 1792)
- November 10 – Lumley Skeffington, English playwright and fop (born 1771)
- December 4 – Robert Gilfillan, Scottish poet (born 1798)
- December 24 – Frédéric Bastiat, French political philosopher (tuberculosis; born 1801)
- December 29 – William Hamilton Maxwell, Scots-Irish novelist (born 1792)

== Awards ==
- Chancellor's Gold Medal – Julian Fane, "Monody on the death of Adelaide, the Queen Dowager"
- Newdigate Prize – Frederick William Faber, "The Knights of St John"

== Sources ==
- Cronin, Vincent. The Romantic Way. Boston: Houghton Mifflin Company, 1966. OCLC 1298969.
- Maurois, André. Prometheus: The Life of Balzac. Trans. Norman Denny. New York: Carroll & Graf, 1965. ISBN 978-0-88184-023-0.
- Robb, Graham. Balzac: A Biography. New York: W. W. Norton & Company, 1994. ISBN 978-0-393-03679-4.
- Varma, Teja. "'No Escape to be Had, No Absolution to be Got': Divorce in the Lives and Novels of Charles Dickens and Caroline Norton". The Victorian Web.
