= Janów Sokólski =

Former shtetl in Poland

Coordinates: 53°28′N 23°14′E

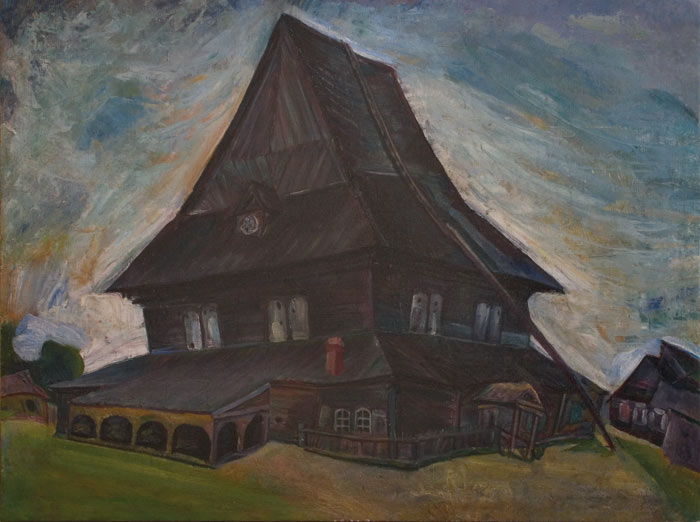
Issachar Ber Ryback - Synagogue in Janow Sokolski

Janów Sokólski (Yiddish: Janowa, Janov) was a stetl in Gmina Sokółka, Sokółka County, Poland, destroyed during German invasion of Poland. Currently only a Jewish cemetery exists. The cemetery and the surrounding agricultural land are the property of gmina The earliest known Jewish community in Janova is dated by 1720. The town was known for its wooden synagogue. (mid-1700s-1941)
