= Kultur Lige =

The Kultur Lige (Culture League) was a secular socialist Jewish organization established in Kiev in 1918, whose aim was to promote Yiddish language literature, theater and culture. The league organized various activities, including theater performances, poetry recitals, and concerts in Yiddish with the aim of disseminating Jewish art in Eastern Europe and Russia. Among some notable members of the organization were the scenic designer Boris Aronson (who later worked on Broadway), the artist and architect El Lissitzky, the writer David Bergelson, the sculptor Joseph Chaikov, the writer Peretz Markish, the poet David Hofstein, musicologist Moisei Beregovsky, and artist Issachar Ber Ryback. Bergelson, Markish and Hofstein were later executed on Joseph Stalin's orders during the Night of the Murdered Poets, in 1952.

Artists like Ryback and Lissitzky who were members of the group tried to develop a distinctively Jewish form of modernism in which abstract forms would be used as a means of expressing and disseminating popular culture.

The manifesto of the group, published in November 1919, stated:

"The goal of the Kulturlige is to assist in creating a new Yiddish secular culture in the Yiddish language, in Jewish national forms, with the living forces of the broad Jewish masses, in the spirit of the working man and in harmony with their ideals of the future."

It also listed the "three pillars" of the Kultur Lige as Yiddish education for the people, Yiddish literature, and Jewish art.

In 1919 members of the group, Victor Alter and Henryk Berlewi, organized a major exhibition of Polish-Jewish art in Białystok under the name "First Exhibition of Jewish Painting and Sculpture". The exhibition was targeted at the Yiddish speaking Jewish community, as well as the Polish workers of the city. During the same year, the organization helped to sponsor sixty three Yiddish schools, fifty four libraries and many other cultural and educational institutions.

In 1920 the Kiev branch of the organization was taken over by the Bolsheviks and the Jewish section of the Soviet Communist party, Yevsektsiya, and subjected to the bureaucracy of the Soviet state. Its printing presses were taken away, it was denied paper for publishing and its central committee was forcefully disbanded. As a result, the Warsaw branch became the main center for the organization.

Afterward, the remains of the Kultur Lige in the Soviet Union continued under the auspices of the Yevsektsiya as a publishing house, mostly focusing on Yiddish textbooks for children. In Poland, the League established offices in other cities such as Wilno and Łódź. In 1924, it began to issue the Literarishe Bleter magazine (based on the Polish Wiadomości Literackie) (Literary News), which became the main forum for discussions by the Yiddish intelligentsia on subjects of art, literature and theater.
