= Issachar Ber Ryback =

Ukrainian-French Jewish painter (1897–1935)

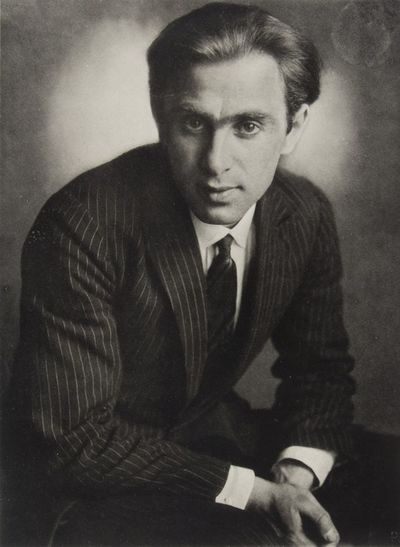
- Born: February 2, 1897; Yelisavetgrad, Russian Empire
- Died: December 22, 1935 (aged 38); Paris, France
- Occupation: Artist

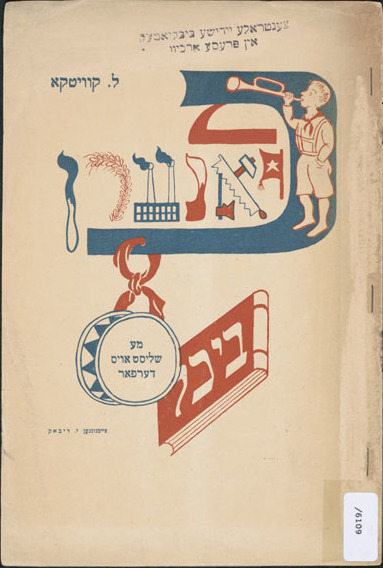
Illustration by Ryback for the book Me shlisṭ oys derfar by Leib Kwitko (USSR, 1922)

Issachar Ber Ryback, also Riback (Іссахар-Бер Рибак; 2 February 1897, in Yelisavetgrad, Russian Empire (today Kropyvnytskyi, Ukraine) – 22 December 1935, in Paris) was a Jewish-Ukrainian-French painter.

== Life ==
Ryback attended the art school in Kyiv until 1916. He joined a progressive group of painters and was influenced by advocates of a modern Jewish literature such as David Bergelson and David Hofstein. The painters Alexander Bogomazov and Alexandra Exter were in Kyiv at the time, and they taught him in 1913. In 1916 El Lissitzky and Ryback were given the task to make Jewish art memorials of schtetls from Ukraine and Belarus. When he participated in an exhibition of Jewish paintings and sculptures in Moscow the spring 1917, his works were especially recommended.

During the October Revolution in 1917, he took part in multiple activities to redefine avantgarde Yiddish culture, e.g., he was a member of Kultur Lige in Kiev. Later he went to Moscow. After his father was killed by Petliura's soldiers in the pogroms in Ukraine, he fled in April 1921 to Kaunas and in October 1921 he obtained a visa for Germany. He was in Berlin until 1924.

He was a member of the Novembergruppe and exhibited his Cubist pictures at both the Berliner Secession and the Juryfreien Kunstausstellung.

He also illustrated three small Yiddish fairy tale books for Miriam Margolin. His Shtetl. Mayn Chorever Heym, a Gedekniss (Shtetl, My Destroyed Home. A memorial) was published in 1923 by Schwellen-Verlag. It is a collection of lithographs of his home town which was destroyed by pogroms. At the time the Jewish education organization World ORT was situated in Berlin and he made the design for its logo.

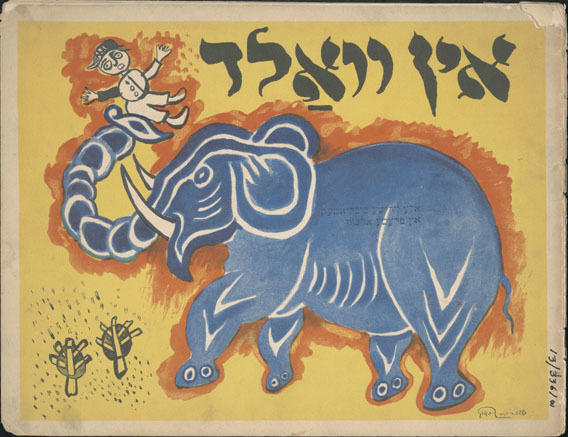
Title page designed by Ryback for the children's book In Vald by Leib Kwitko (Berlin, 1922)

In 1924 he tried to work in the Soviet Union by decorating scenes at Yiddish theaters.

In 1926 he emigrated to Paris and did not return to Russia.

In 1928 he had a solo exhibition in the "Galerie aux Quatre Chemins“ and in 1929 in the "Galerie L’Art Contemporain“. His style of painting had turned to the Expressionistic coloring of the School of Paris in the interwar period. Further exhibitions followed at galleries in The Hague, Rotterdam, Brussels and Antwerp. In 1935 he traveled to the opening of his exhibition in Cambridge. He did not live to see the retrospective exhibition in Paris organised by Georges Wildenstein.

Rybak was a contemporary of Jewish-Russian artists Natan Issajewitsch Altman, Boris Aronson and Marc Chagall, who transmitted the Jewish tradition in modern art.

Most of the works he left behind are in the Museum Ryback in Bat Yam in Israel, a part of the MoBY-Museums of Bat Yam complex.

== Gallery ==
Synagogues and towns
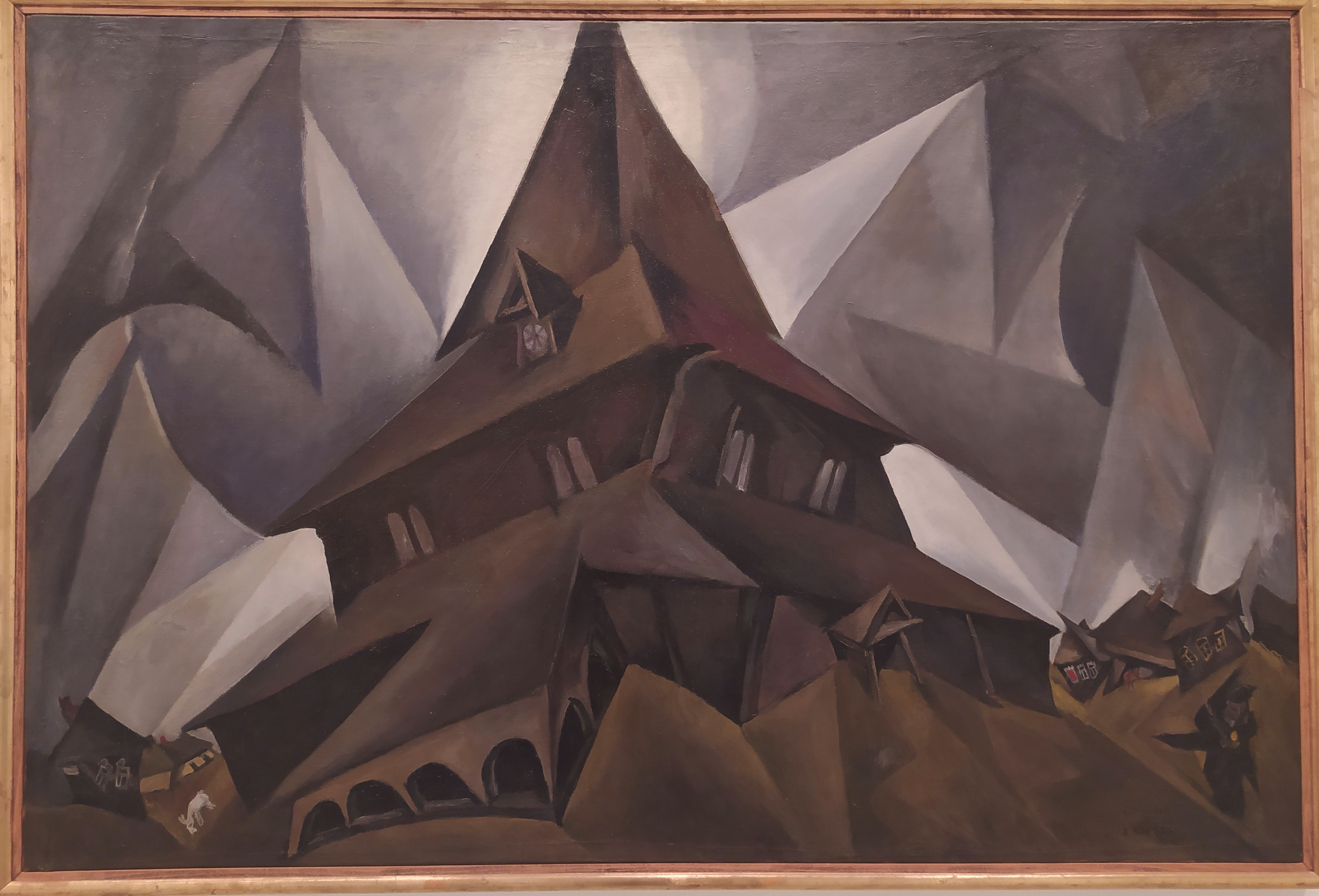
The Synagogue in Dubrouna (1917)

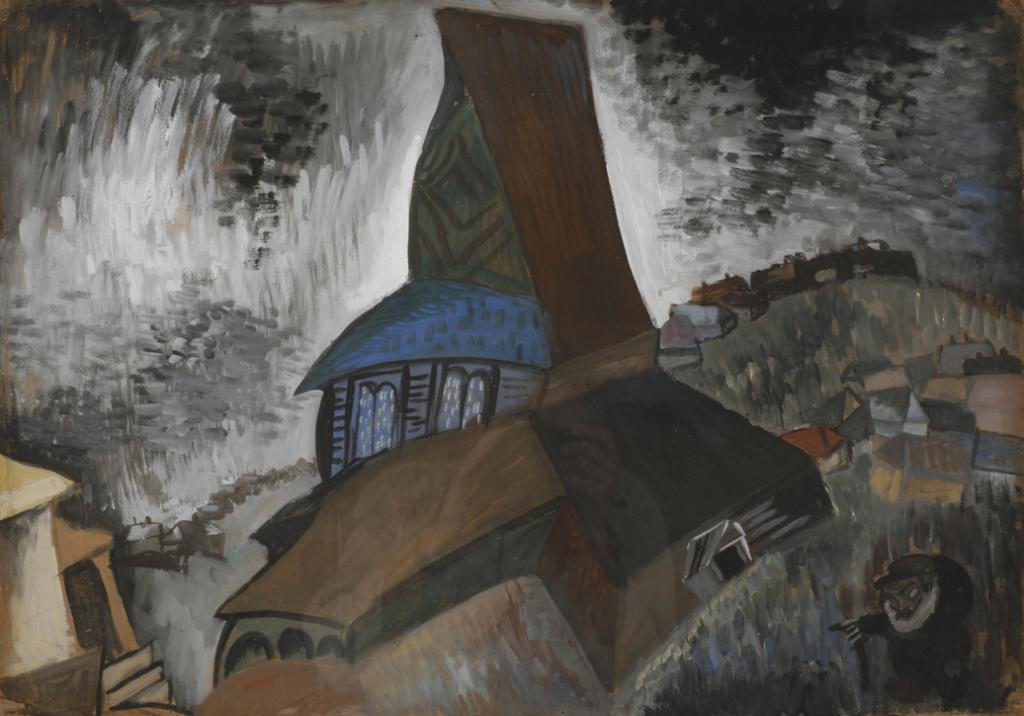
Old Synagogue

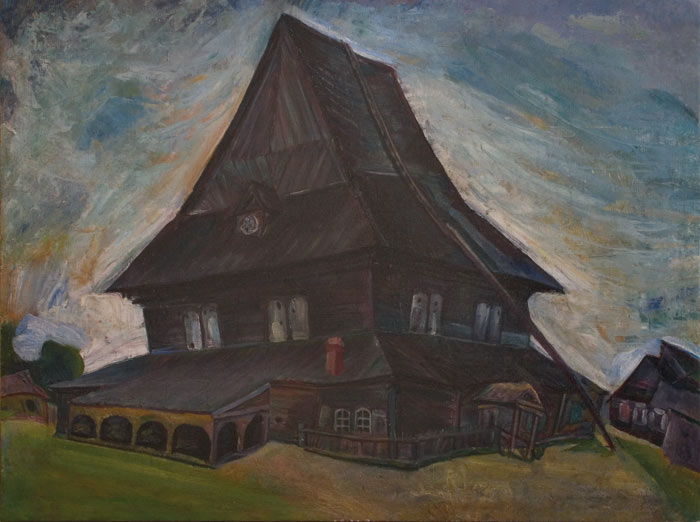
Synagogue in Janów Sokolski

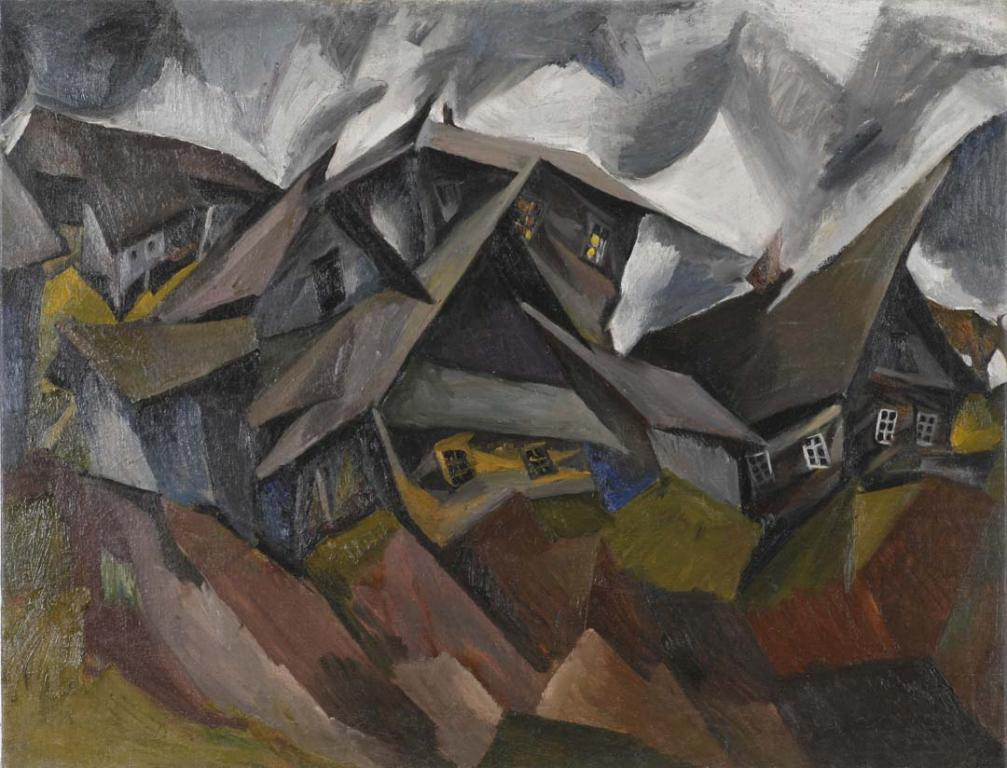
Houses in a small Town

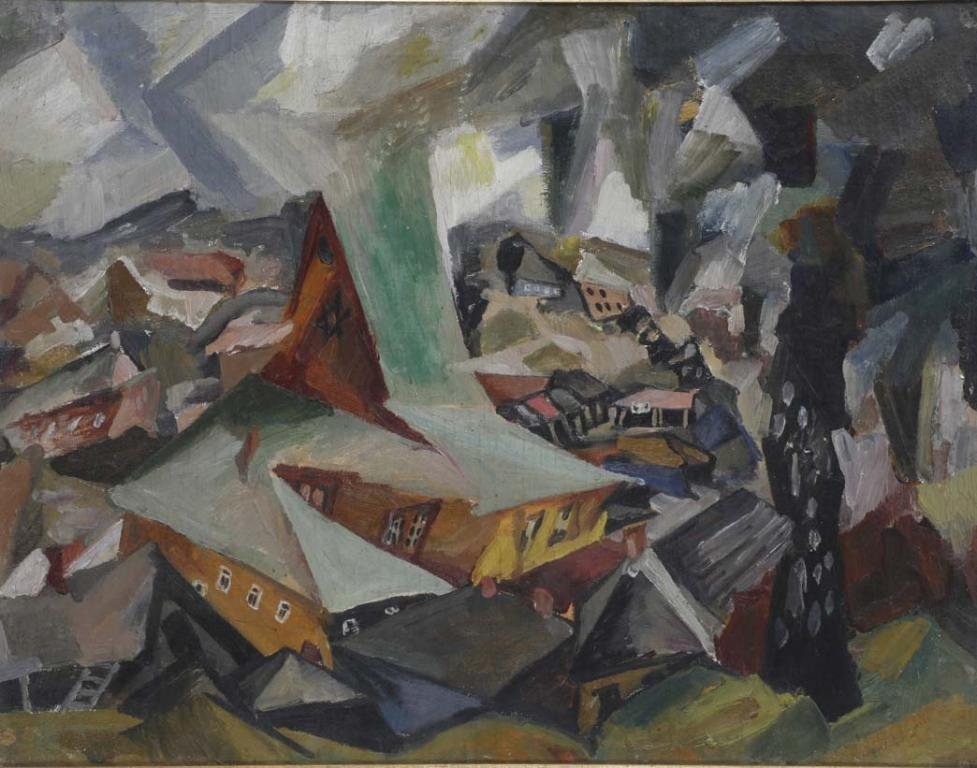
Small Town after a Pogrom

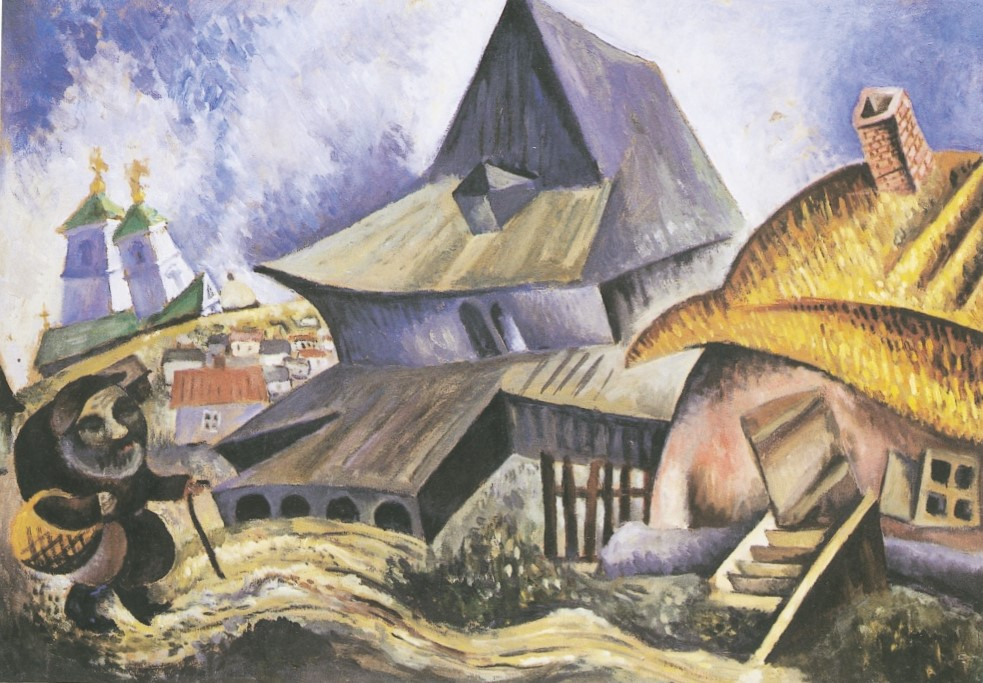
My village

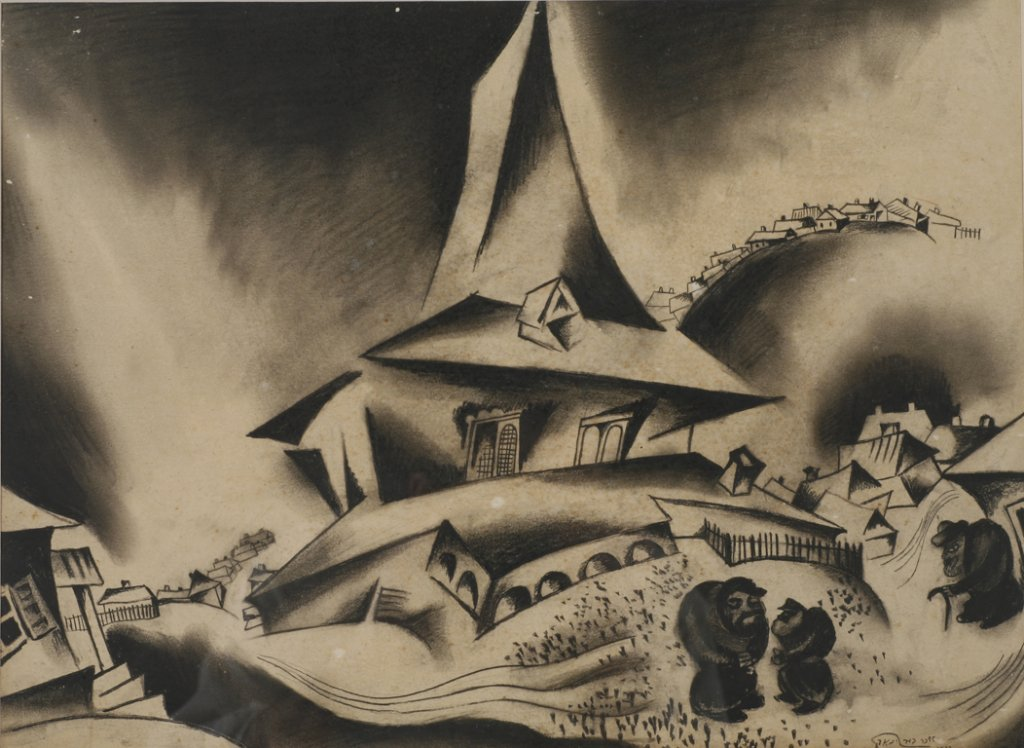
A Big Synagogue

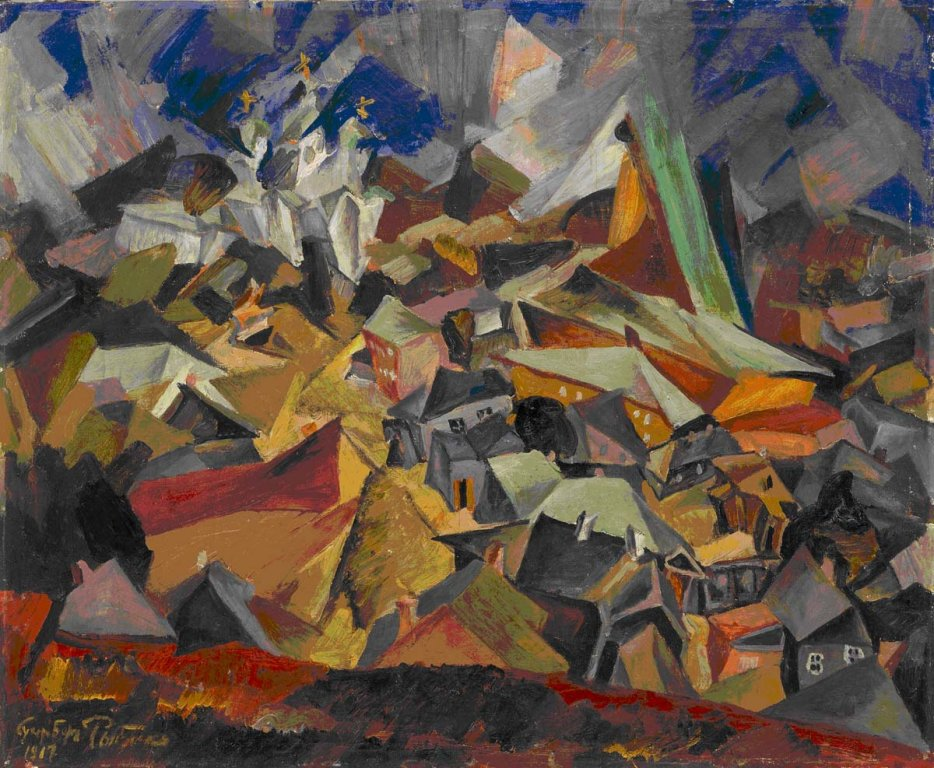
Town

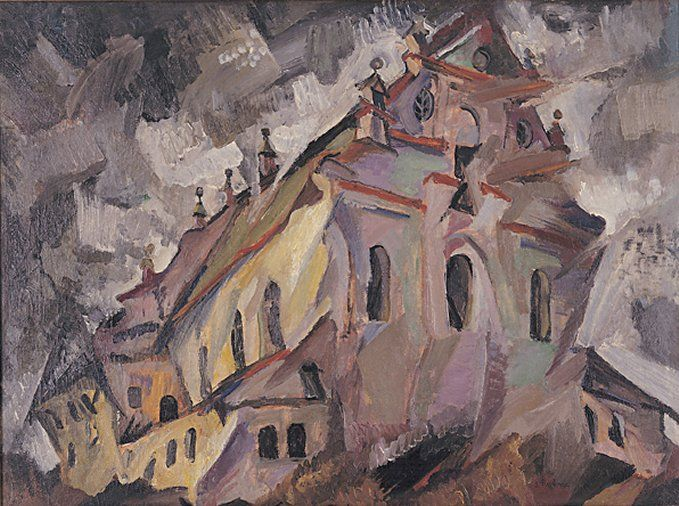
Shklow, Miashchanskaya Street, Synagogue
Scenes from shtetl life
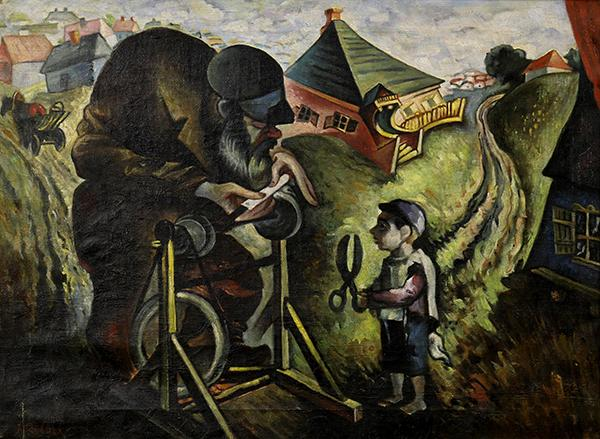
The Sharpener

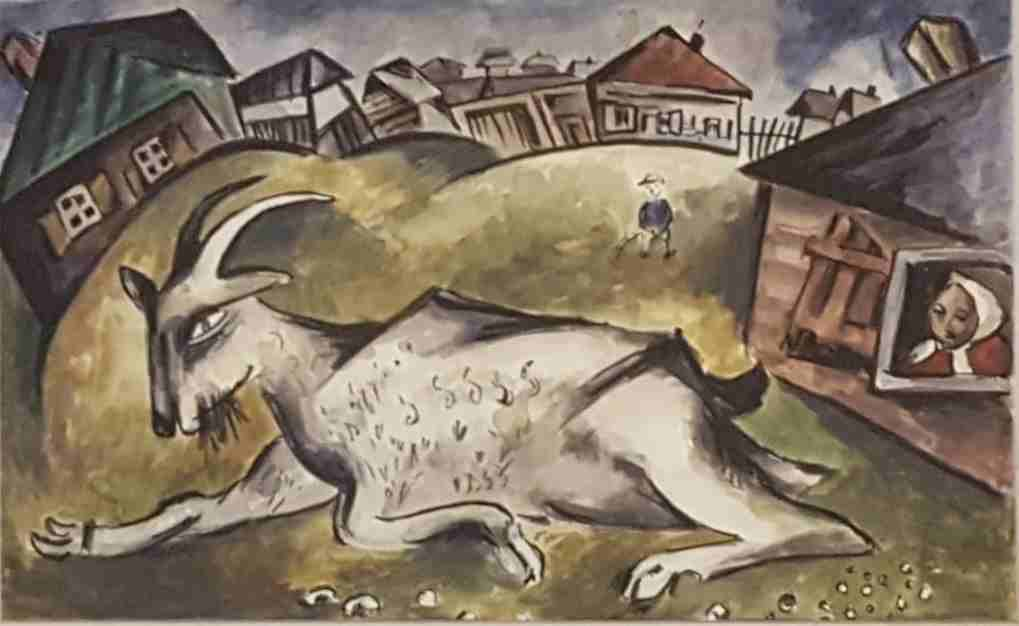
A Goat (1917)

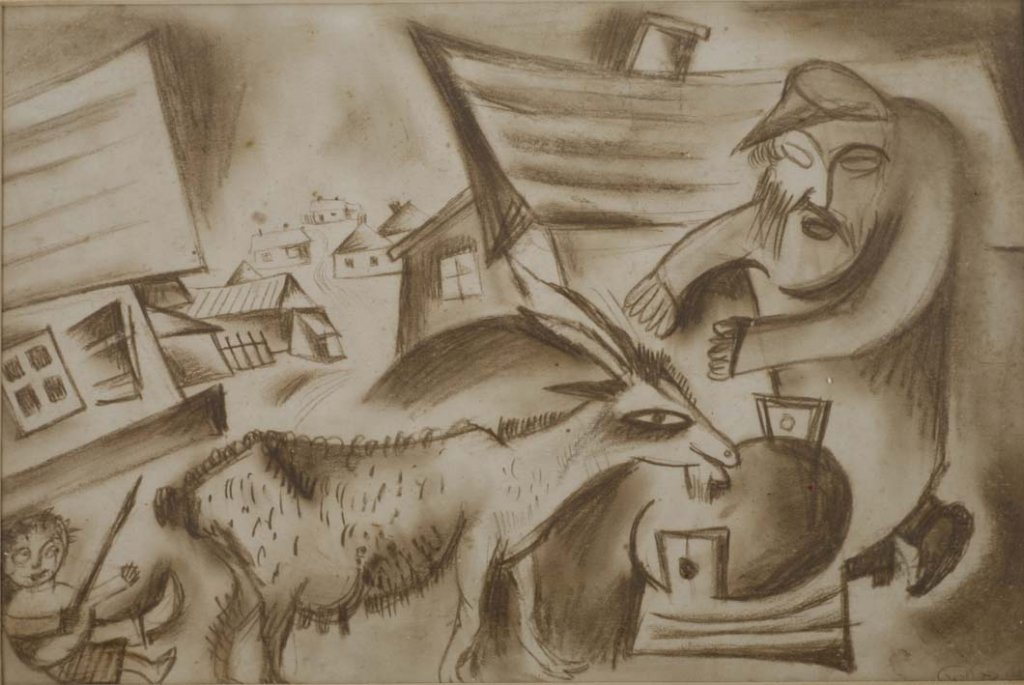
A Jew with a Goat

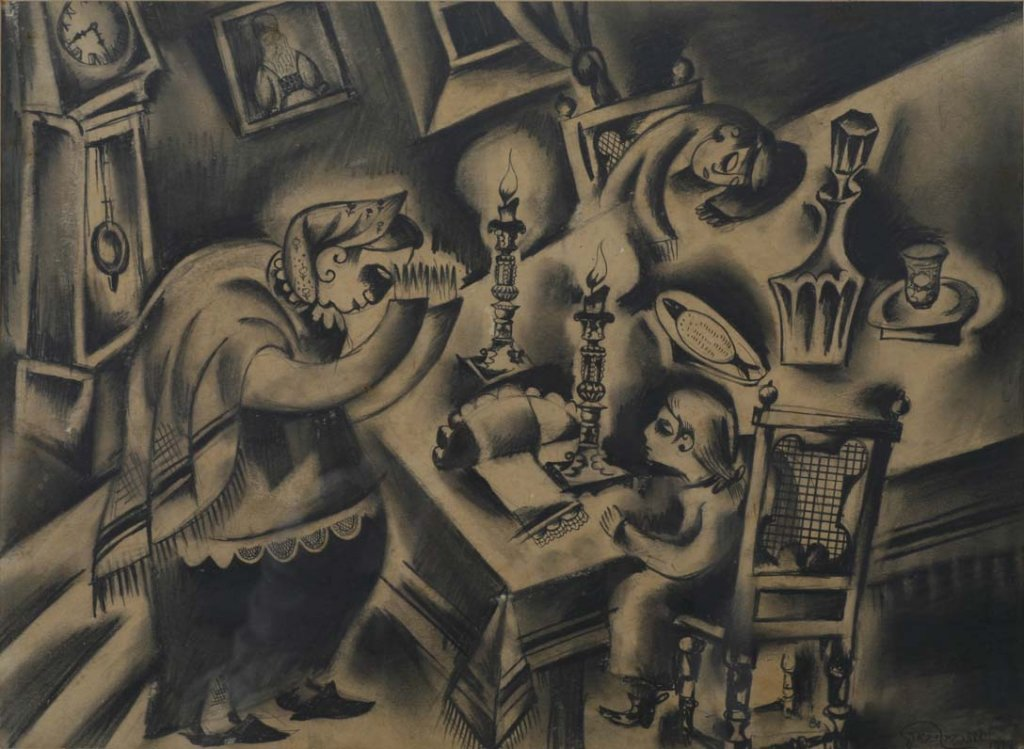
Blessing

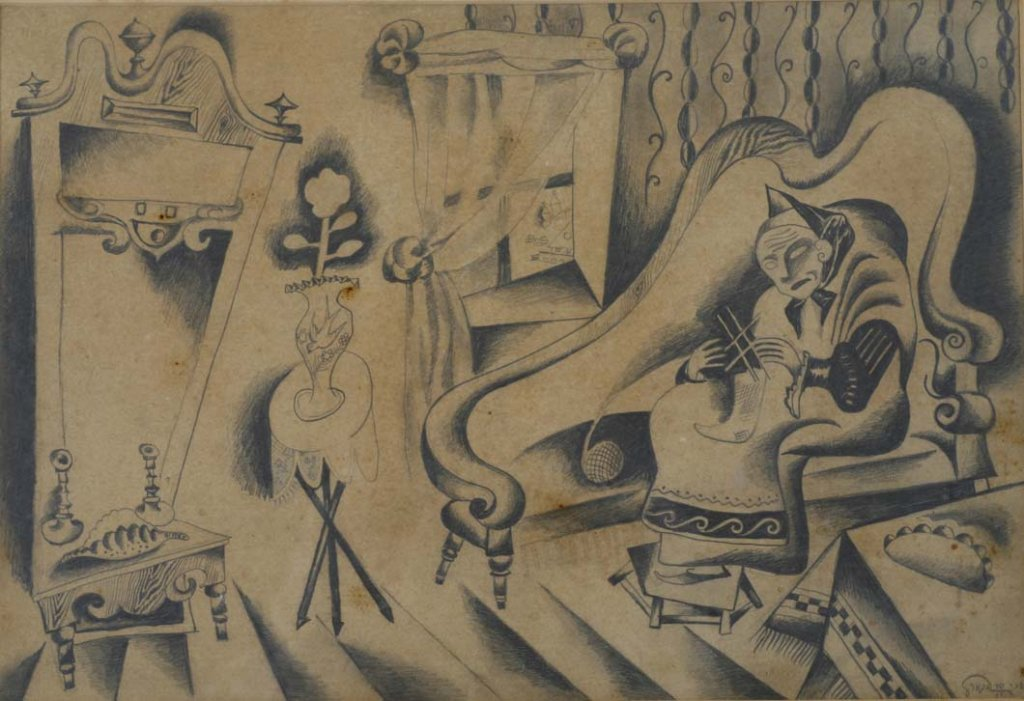
Interior with Knitting Woman

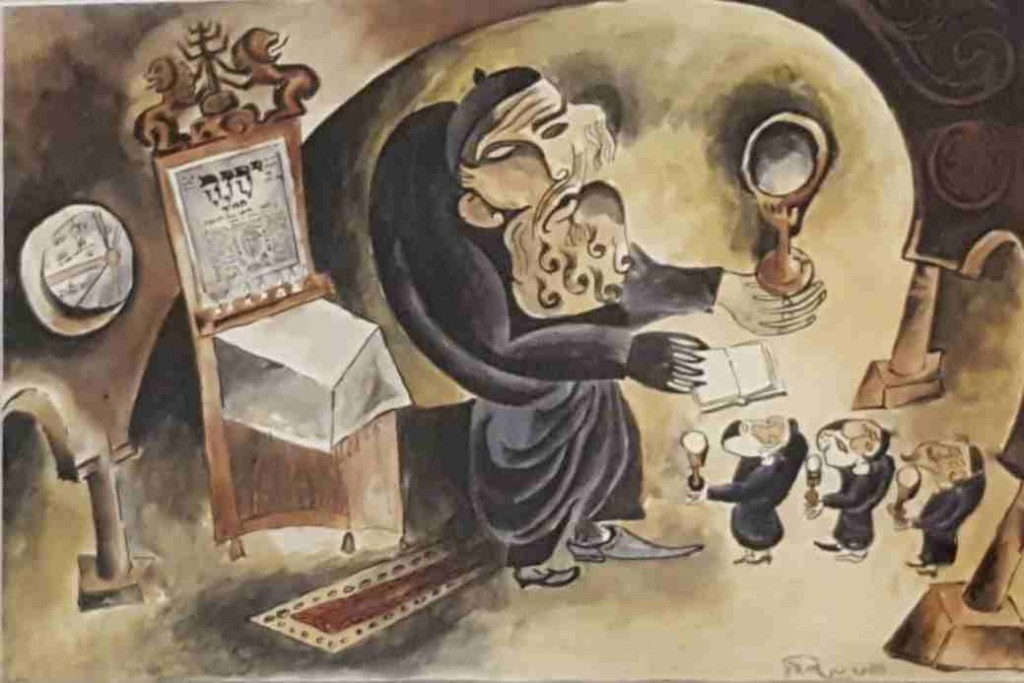
Interior with Red Carpet

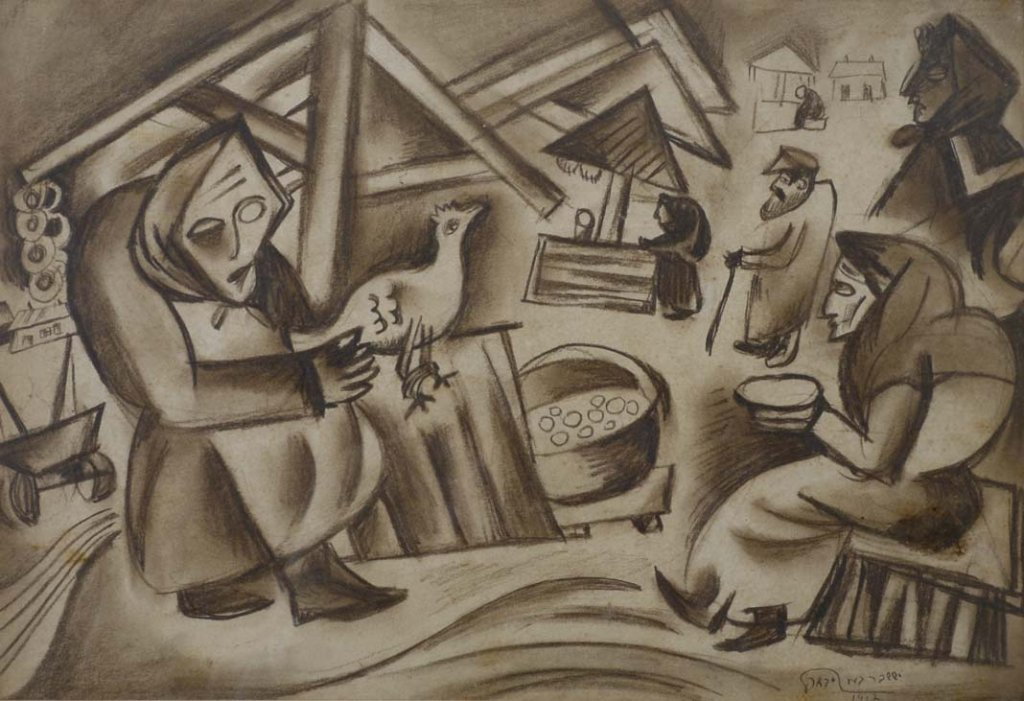
Market in a Small Town

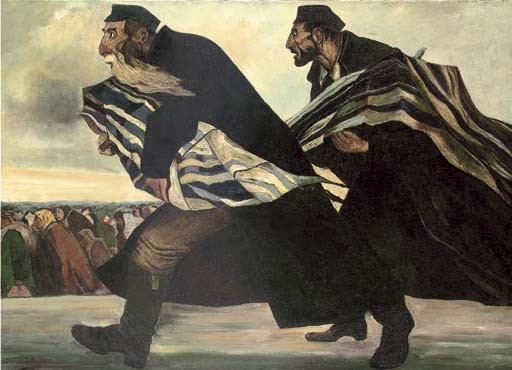
Pogrom

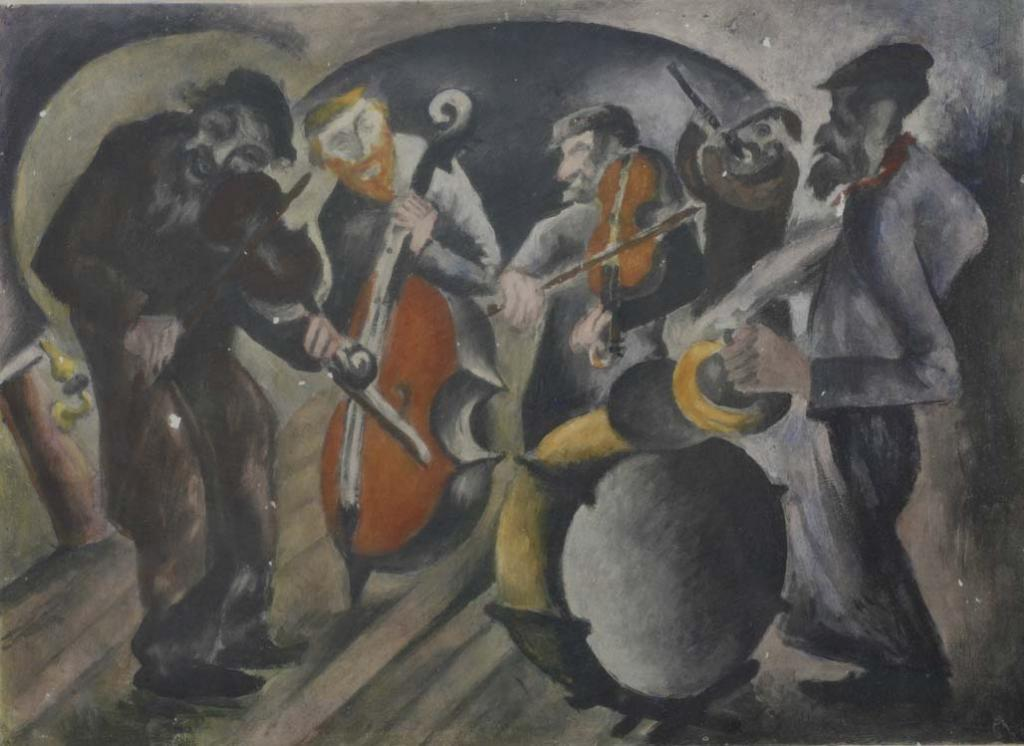
Musicians

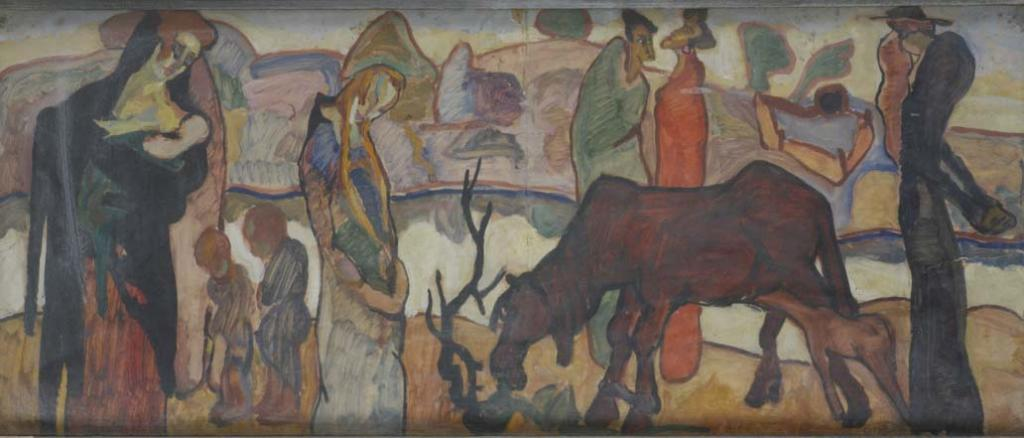
Near the River

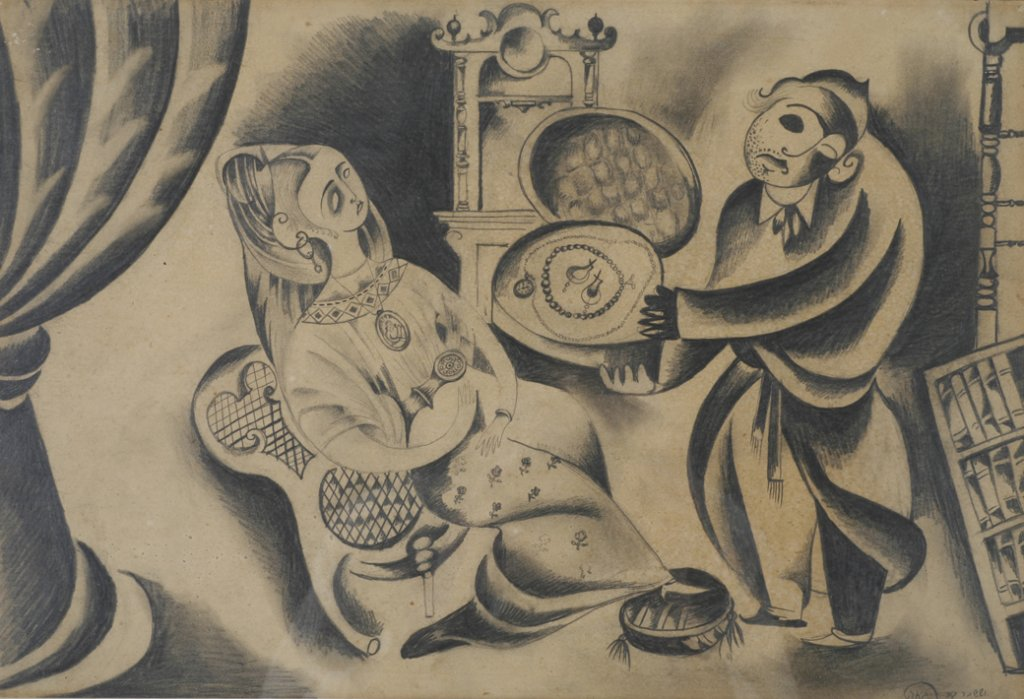
Offering a Present

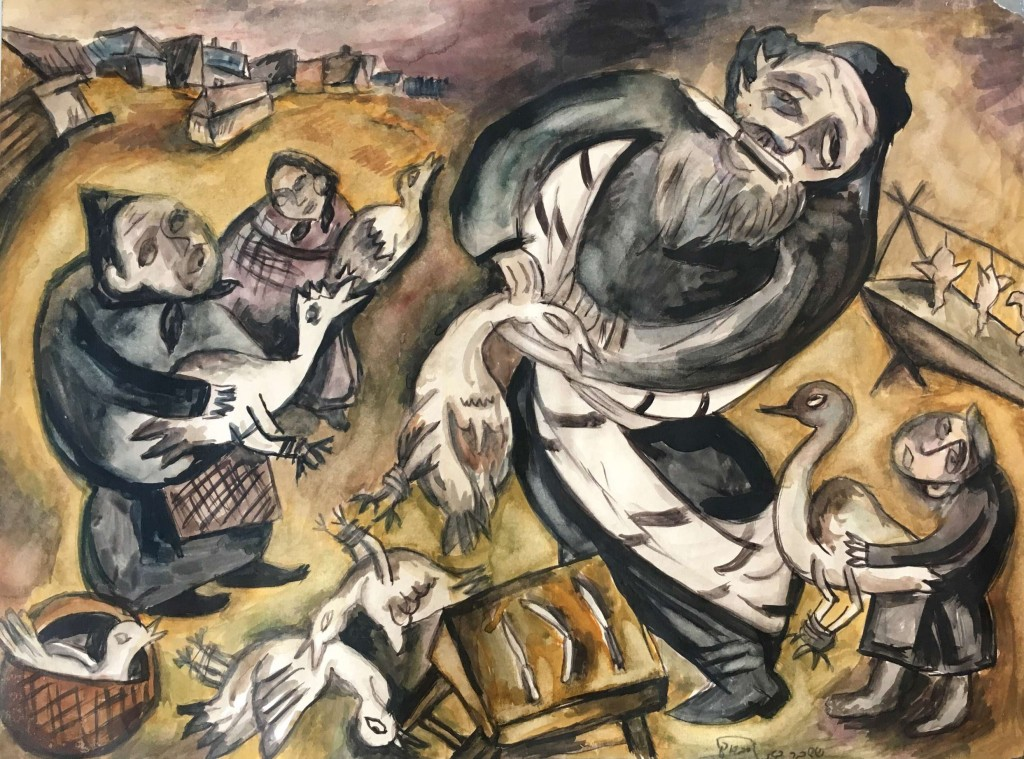
Reznik

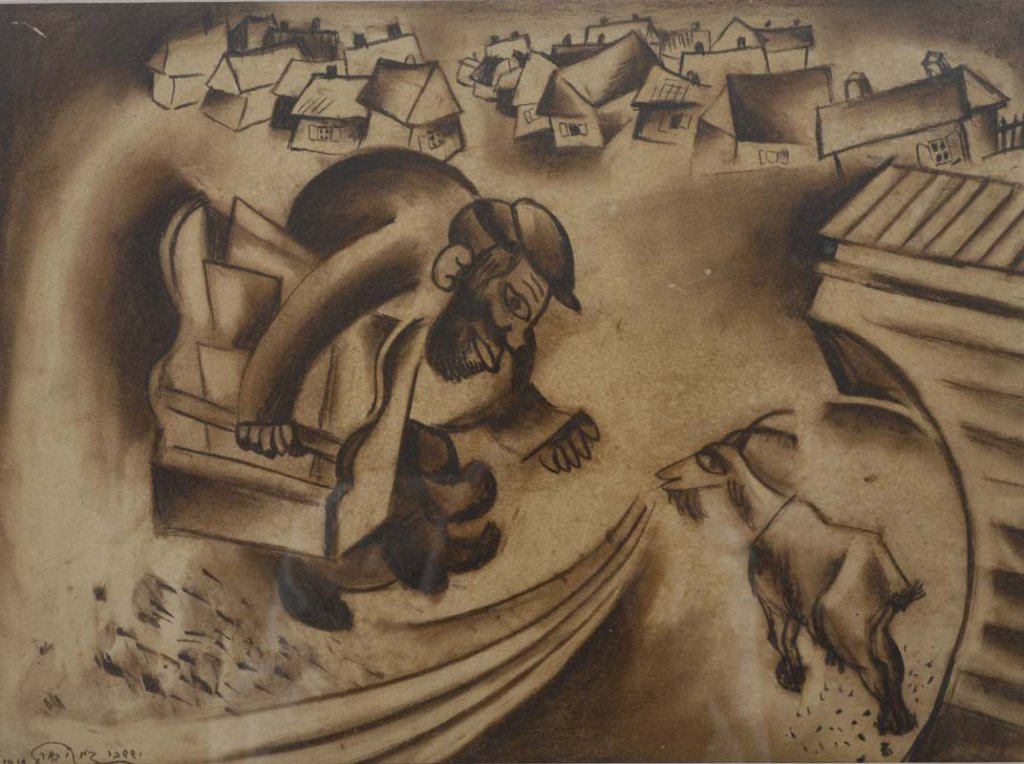
The Glazier

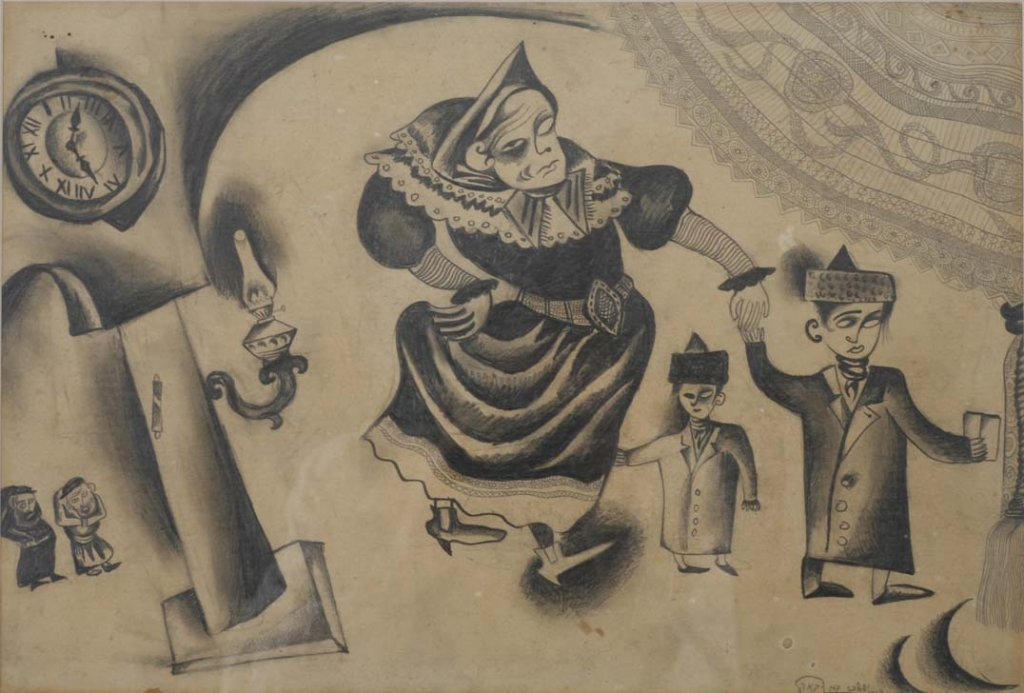
The Rabbi's Wife

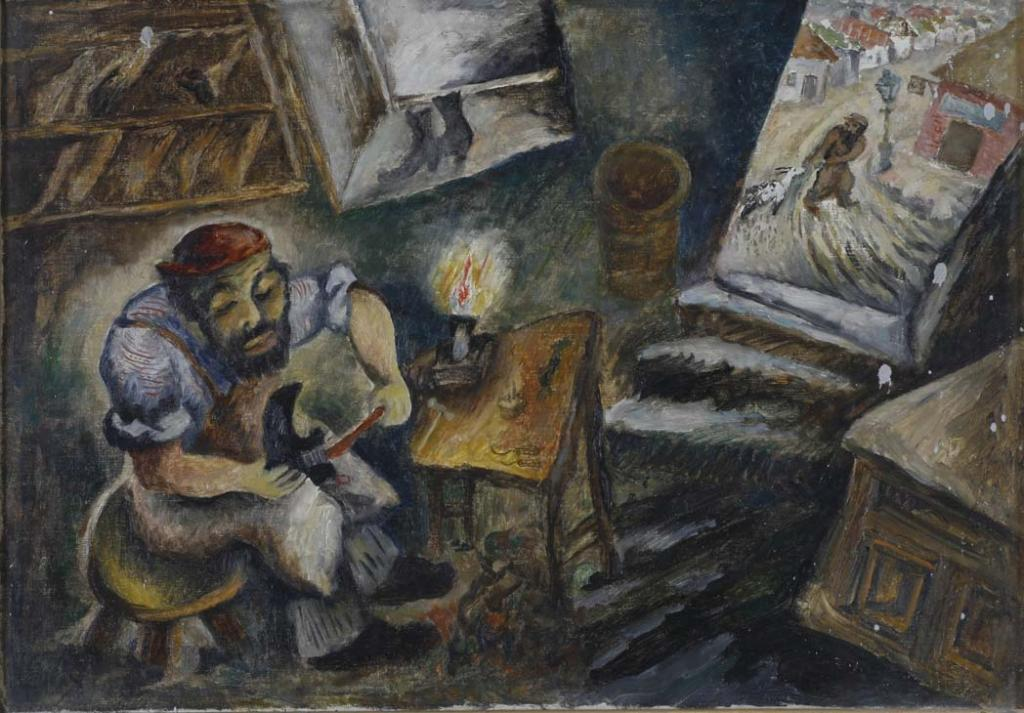
The Shoemaker

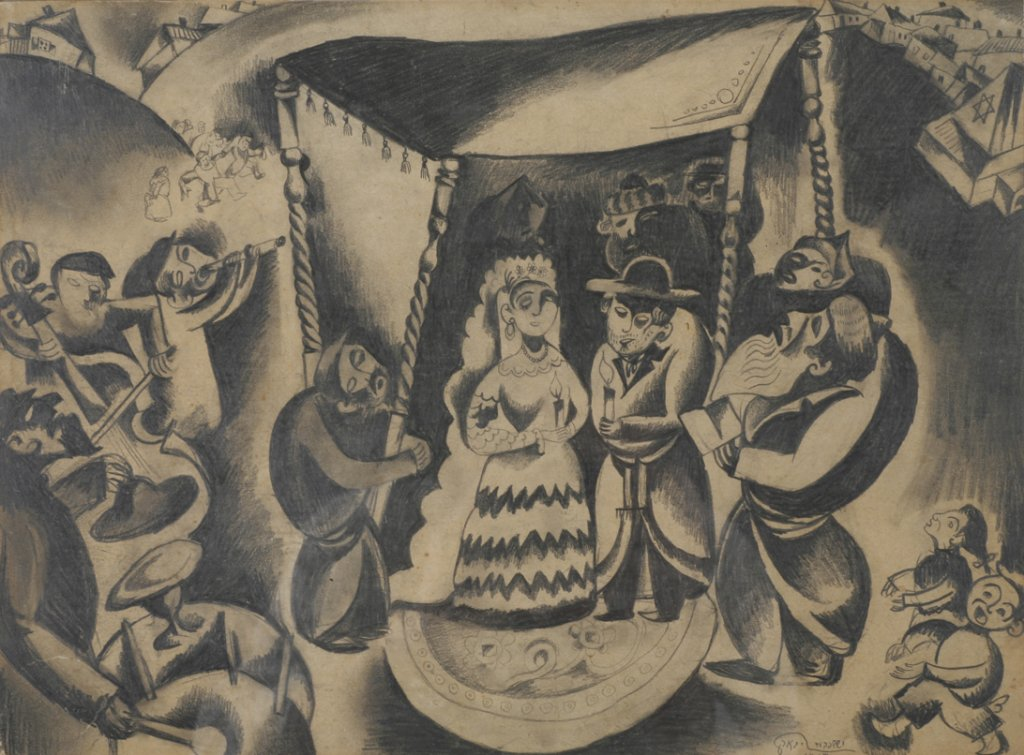
Wedding Ceremony
Women portraits
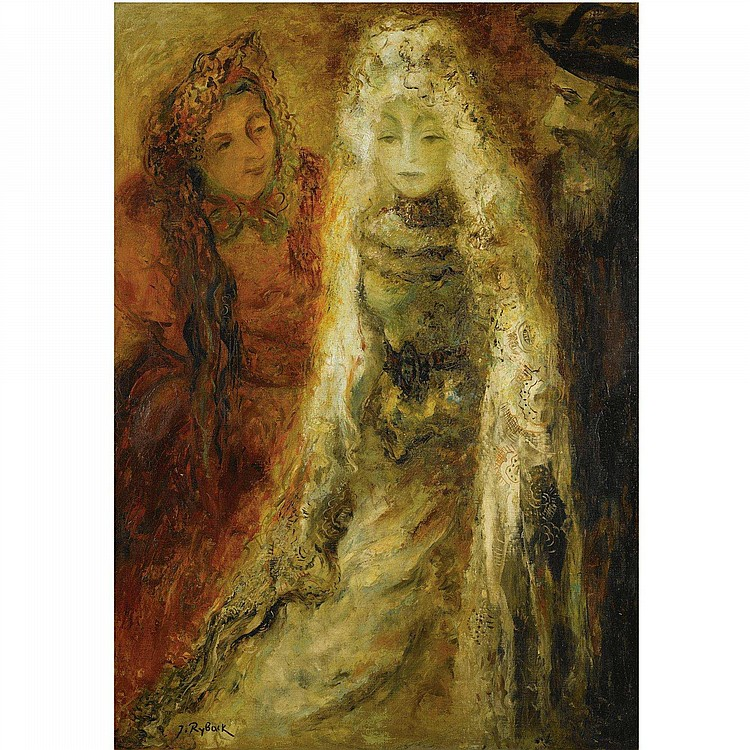
Fiancée

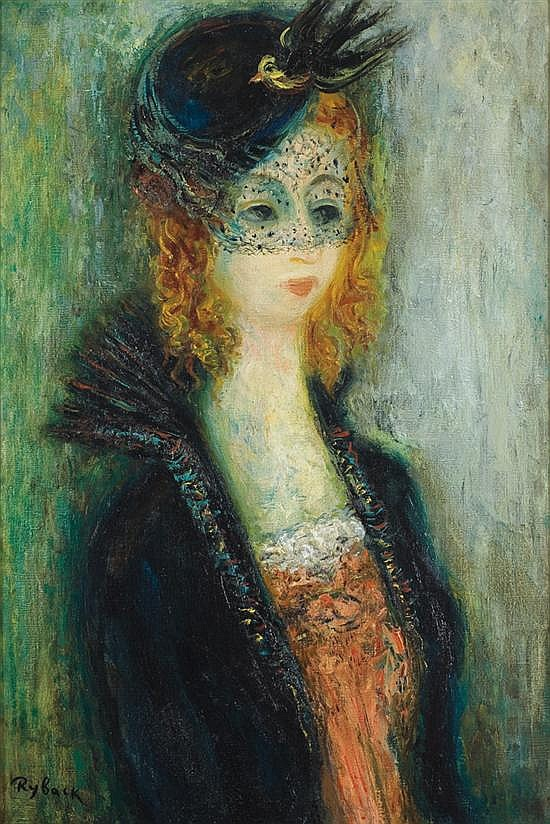
Romantic Portrait

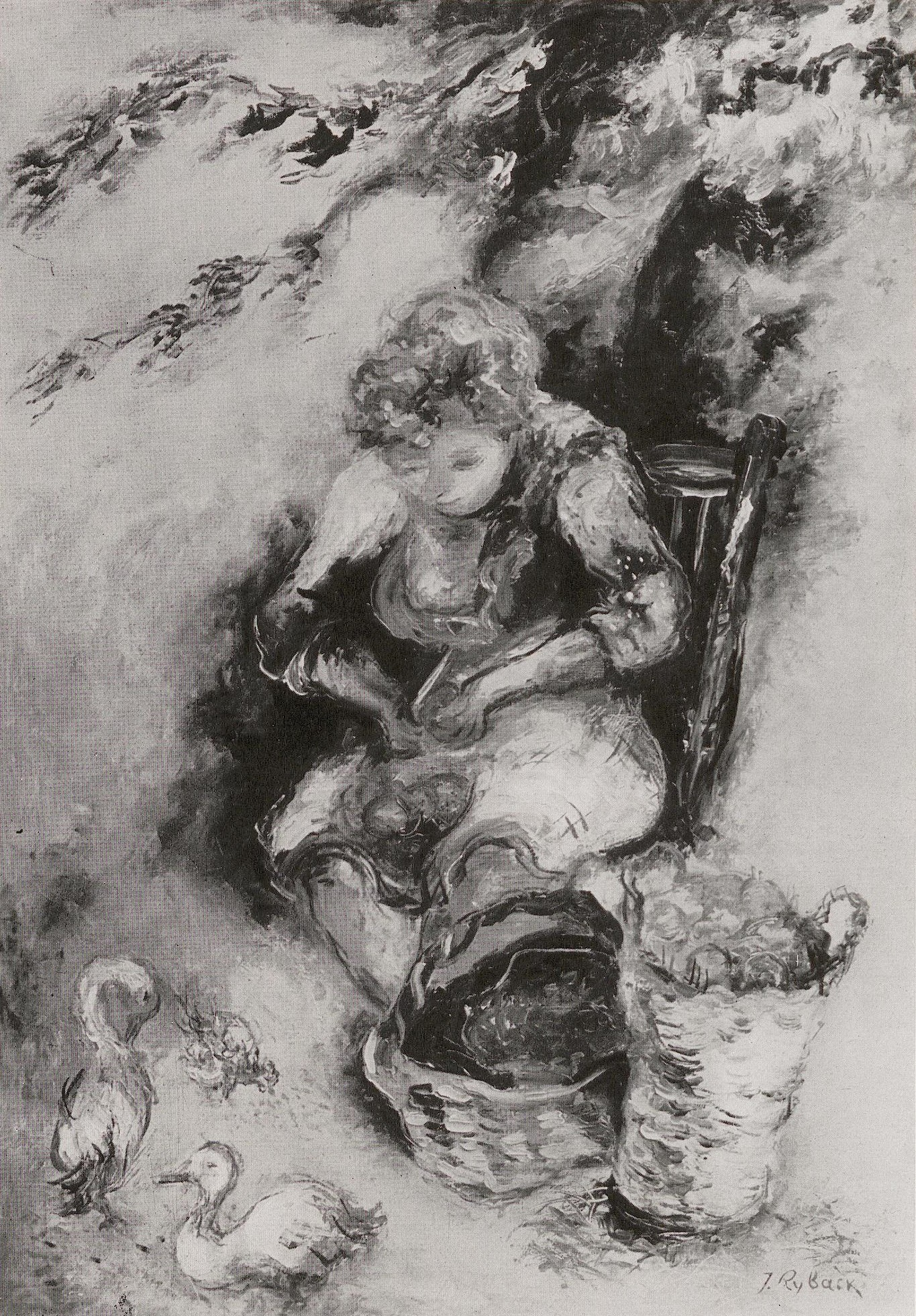
In the Shade

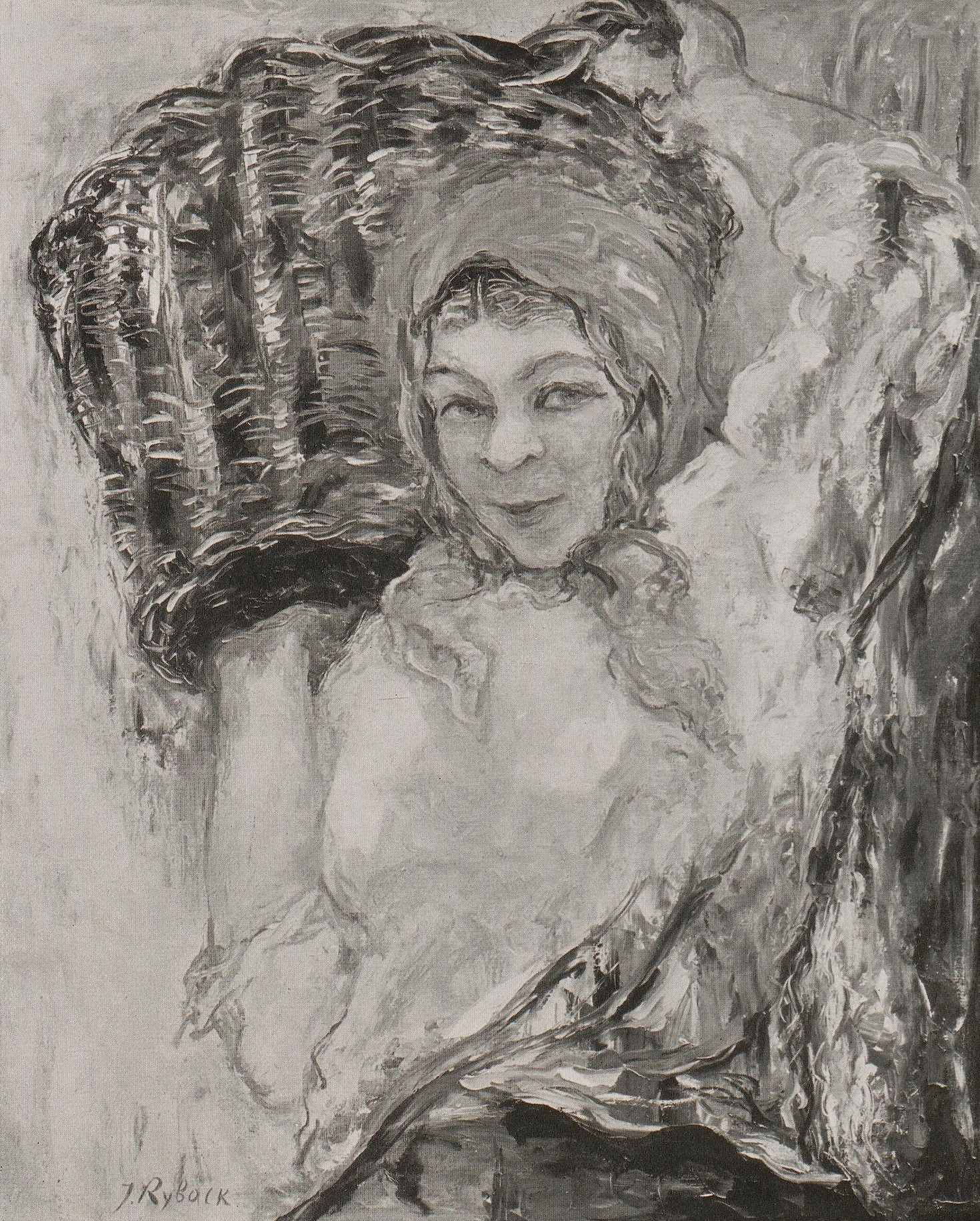
Russian Peasant Woman

== Selected publications ==
- Ausstellung. J. Ryback. Buch u. Kunstdruckerei Lutze und Vogt, Berlin 1923.
- A l'ombre du passe. Les Editions Graphiques, Paris 1932.
- Leib Kwitko: In Vald ("Im Wald"), Zeichnungen von Issachar Ryback, Schwellen Verlag, Berlin 1922. In Jiddisch und in deutscher Übersetzung enthalten in: David Bergelson, Lejb Kwitko, Peretz Markisch, Ber Smoliar: Der Galaganer Hahn: jiddische Kinderbücher aus Berlin; jiddisch und deutsch, Aus d. Jidd. übertr. und hrsg. von Andrej Jendrusch, Berlin: Ed. DODO, 2003 ISBN 3-934351-06-9
- Leib Kwitko: Voigelen ("Vögel"), Zeichnungen von Issachar Ryback, Schwellen Verlag, Berlin 1922. In Jiddisch und in deutscher Übersetzung enthalten in: David Bergelson, Lejb Kwitko, Peretz Markisch, Ber Smoliar: Der Galaganer Hahn: jiddische Kinderbücher aus Berlin; jiddisch und deutsch, Aus d. Jidd. übertr. und hrsg. von Andrej Jendrusch, Berlin: Ed. DODO, 2003 ISBN 3-934351-06-9

== Literature ==
- Salomon Wininger: Große jüdische National-Biographie. Kraus Reprint, Nendeln 1979, ISBN 3-262-01204-1 (Nachdr. d. Ausg. Czernowitz 1925). Band 5, S. 189
- Issesokher Ber Ribak: zayn lebn un shafn. Funm Komitet tsu fareybikn dem ondek fun Issesokher Ber Ribak, Paris 1937
- Zalmen Reyzen: Ryback Issakhar Ber. In: Lexikon fun der yiddisher literatur, presse un filologie. Band 4, Farlag fun B. Kletskin, Wilna 1929, S. 316–320
- Raymond Cogniat: I. Ryback. Ėditions L’Amitié Française, Paris 1934.
- Karl Schwarz: Jewish Artists of the 19h and 20h Centuries. New York 1949, S. 203–207
- Mané-Katz – Issachar Ryback: Connections. Mané-Katz Museum, Spring 1993. Haifa, 1993.
- KULTUR-LIGE Artistic Avant-Garde of the 1910s and the 1920s. 20 December 2007 – 20 January 2008, National Museum of Art of Ukraine
- Sigalit Meidler-Waks: Issachar Ber Ryback. Leben und Werk. Hentrich & Hentrich, Berlin 2019, ISBN 978-3-95565-311-8
