= The Burial Mound =

The Burial Mound (Kjæmpehøjen) was Henrik Ibsen's second play and his first play to be performed. It is a one-act verse drama, written in 1850 when Ibsen was 22 years old. The play was first performed at the Christiania Theater on 26 September 1850, under Ibsen's pseudonym Brynjolf Bjarme.

The play was re-written in 1854 for a new performance at "Det Norske Theater" in Bergen, where Ibsen at the time worked as a writer, producer and director.
