= Joseph Chaikov =

Soviet sculptor of Ukrainian Jewish origin

Joseph Moisevich Chaikov (Russian: Иосиф Моисеевич Чайков, also spelled, among other spellings, Tshaykov, Tchaikov, and Tchaikovsky; 1888 – 1979) was a Russian Imperial and Soviet Russian sculptor, graphic designer and teacher of Ukrainian Jewish descent.

== Biography ==
Born in Kiev (present-day Kyiv, Ukraine) and initially trained as an engraver, Chaikov studied in Paris in the years 1910 through 1914. In 1912 he co-founded a group of young Jewish artists called Mahmad, and published a Hebrew-language magazine with that name; in 1913 he participated in the Salon d'Automne.

He returned to Kiev in 1914. He was co-founder, along with El Lissitzky, Boris Aronson and others, of the Jewish socialist Kultur Lige in Kiev, led sculpture classes there, supervised a children's art studio and illustrated children's books, and in post-revolutionary Kiev focused on billboards and agitational propaganda. In 1921 he published the Yiddish-language book Skulptur, advocating avant-garde sculpture as a contribution to a new Jewish art. This book was also the first book on sculpture to be published in Yiddish.

Chaikov moved to Moscow to teach at Vkhutemas from 1923 to 1930, alongside fellow sculptors Boris Korolev and Vera Mukhina. All three designed and taught cubist sculpture in the distinctively Russian Cubo-Futurism style, radically geometric and highly dynamic. From 1929 Chaikov was the head of the Society of Russian Sculptors. In 1932, after the end of the period of artistic freedom, all of these cubists turned back to Socialist Realism and produced more classically styled work.

In the 1930s, his work was prominently shown at the two Soviet world's fair pavilions, for the 1937 Paris Exposition and the 1939 New York World's Fair. His work in Paris was an extensive frieze of nine-foot figures, the People of the USSR, carved on two steles flanking the entrance to the pavilion. Fragments of the Paris work were unearthed in rural France in the 2000s, after having been presented to the French labor union after the fair, relocated to a holiday château, broken up by pro-Nazi youth during the occupation, and buried for 50 years.

Chaikov continued to work in a variety of genres, techniques and scales. He was named an Honored Artist of the USSR in 1959, and his work is in the permanent collection of MOMA. He died in Moscow. On the grave of Chaikov and his wife at the Donskoye Cemetery in Moscow is a tombstone designed by Chaikov, with his self-portrait and his wife's portrait.

== Major works ==
- People of the USSR – friezes on steles flanking the entrance to the Soviet Pavilion at the 1937 Paris Exposition, for architect Boris Iofan (recently rediscovered)
- Bas reliefs for the Soviet Pavilion at the 1939 New York World's Fair, for architect Iofan
- The golden Friendship of the Nations fountain at the All-Russia Exhibition Centre, Moscow, circa 1954 (with fellow sculptors Z. Bazhenova, L. Bazhenova, A. Teneta, and Z. Rileeva)
