= Critical and Historical Essays (Macaulay) =

1843 book by Thomas Babington Macaulay

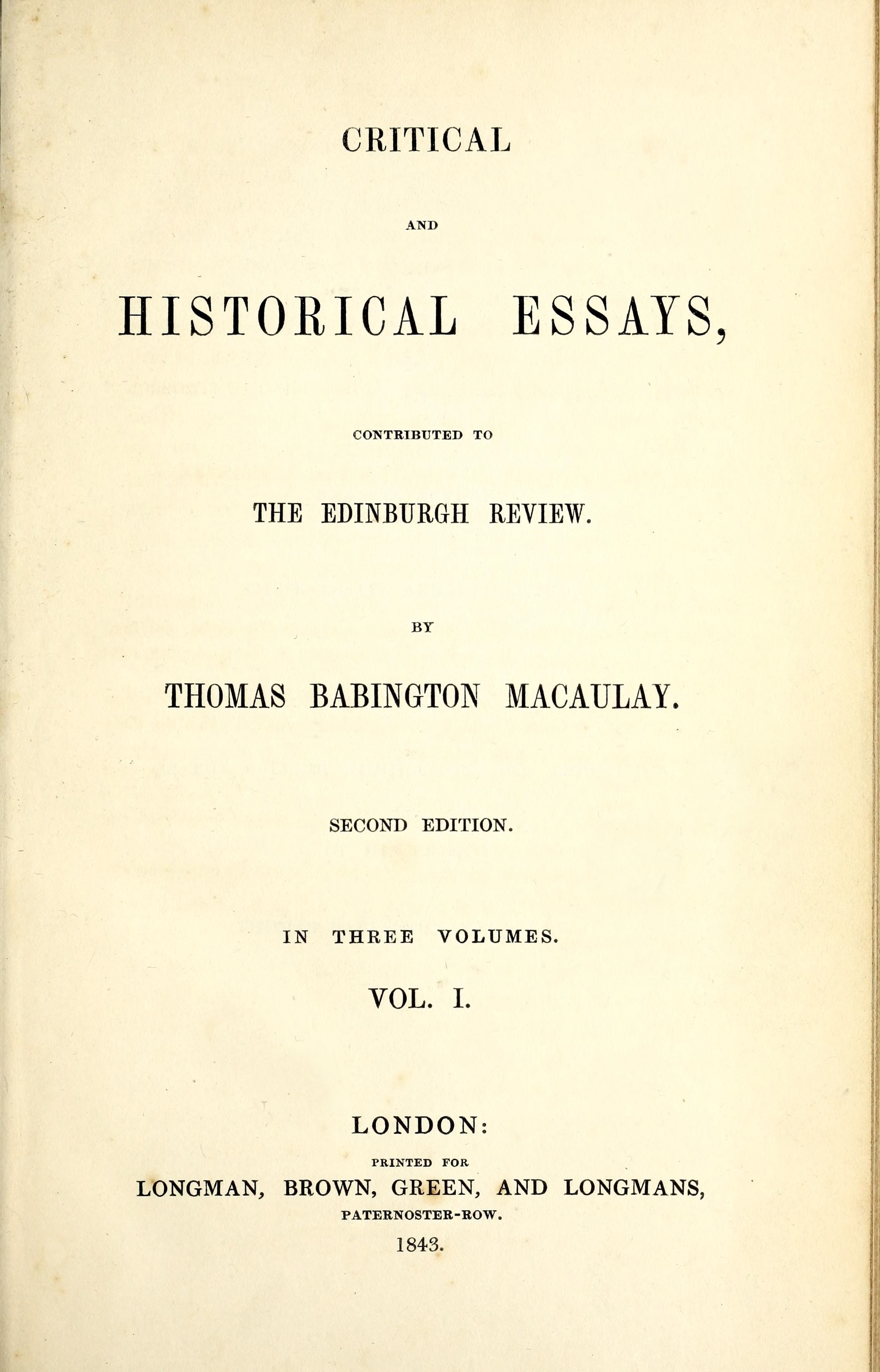
Title page of the 1843 second edition

Critical and Historical Essays: Contributed to the Edinburgh Review (1843) is a collection of articles by Thomas Babington Macaulay, later Lord Macaulay. They have been acclaimed for their readability, but criticized for their inflexible attachment to the attitudes of the Whig school of history.

== Contents ==
The essays first appeared in the following issues of the Edinburgh Review:

- Milton, August 1825
- Machiavelli, March 1827
- Hallam, September 1828
- Southey's Colloquies, January 1830
- Mr. Robert Montgomery, April 1830
- Civil Disabilities of the Jews, January 1831
- Moore's Life of Lord Byron, June 1831
- Samuel Johnson (Croker's Boswell), September 1831
- John Bunyan (Pilgrim's Progress), December 1831
- John Hampden, December 1831
- Burleigh and His Times, April 1832
- War of the Succession in Spain, January 1833
- Horace Walpole, October 1833
- William Pitt, Earl of Chatham, January 1834
- Sir James Mackintosh, July 1835
- Francis Bacon, July 1837
- Sir William Temple, October 1838
- Gladstone on Church and State, April 1839
- Lord Clive, January 1840
- Von Ranke, October 1840
- Leigh Hunt (Comic Dramatists), January 1841
- Lord Holland, July 1841
- Warren Hastings, October 1841
- Frederic the Great, April 1842
- Madame D'Arblay, January 1843
- The Life and Writings of Addison, July 1843
- The Earl of Chatham, October 1844

== Composition and publication ==
Macaulay's first essays were contributed to Knight's Quarterly Magazine, but in January 1825 the Edinburgh Review published an article of his on West Indian slavery and in August of the same year an essay on Milton which made his name. Over the next 20 years he became one of their most regular and most popular reviewers, and his success in this line helped to promote his rise in politics. In 1843 he was persuaded to collect his reviews in book form, and the Critical and Historical Essays were duly published by Longman in three volumes. Macaulay restricted the collection to his contributions to the Edinburgh Review, and left out some of these also, especially those which he thought were of ephemeral interest or which personally attacked former political enemies.

== Reception ==
Critical and Historical Essays was from the first a successful undertaking, reaching a seventh reprinting by 1849, and it was soon being read all over the English-speaking world. One 19th century traveller in Australia reported that the books he found there were for the most part copies of the Bible, Shakespeare, and Macaulay's Essays. At the end of the 19th century George Saintsbury gave the Essays high praise, though only as broad-brush sketches:

On any subject which Macaulay has touched, his survey is unsurpassable for giving a first bird's-eye view, and for creating interest in the matter…You need not – you had much better not – pin your faith on his details, but his Pisgah sights are admirable.

Saintsbury's contemporary the historian Frederic Harrison credited Macaulay's influence with ensuring that "the best journals and periodicals of our day are written in a style so clear, so direct, so resonant." More recently the scholar Angus Ross judged that the popularity of the Essays was founded on Macaulay's "firm and unqualified belief in his own strong opinions; a large stock of miscellaneous information; a brilliant and slashing style; and considerable insensitivity." Another contemporary critic speaks for many when he sets off Macaulay's "rapid, sparkling, transparent, utterly lucid" style against the prejudice and inaccuracy he brought to his advocacy of the Whig view of history.
