= Skulptur =

1921 Yiddish language book

Skulptur (Yiddish: סקולפּטור, 'Sculpture') is a 1921 Yiddish language short book written by Joseph Chaikov. The book was the first in Yiddish on sculpture.

In Skulptur, Chaikov advocates avant-garde sculpture as a contribution to a new Jewish art. Skulptur was published by Melukhe Farlag in Kiev and contains 15 pages.
