= The Book of All Power =

1921 novel by Edgar Wallace

- Author: Edgar Wallace
- Language: English
- Genre: Thriller
- Publisher: Ward Lock
- Publication date: 1921
- Publication place: United Kingdom
- Media type: Print

The Book of All Power is a 1921 thriller novel by the British writer Edgar Wallace. It is an adventure story set around the time of the Russian Revolution of 1917.

== Plot ==
Malcolm Hay is a young man in London about to become an engineer for a Ukrainian-English oil company in the period before the First World War. The novel is set between the period 1914 to 1919. The Chairman of the Ukrainian Oil Company suggests that he meet Israel Kensky, a wealthy and influential elderly Jewish Russian man, before departing. In London, Hay becomes embroiled in machinations and intrigues involving the Romanov monarchy. The Grand Duke Yaroslav, the Prince Serganoff, Kensky's daughter Sophia, Boolba, American gangster Cherry Bim, and the Grand-Duchess Irene Yaroslav become entangled in plots, conspiracies, and assassination plans.

Serganoff, the Chief of the St. Petersburg Police, attempts to blackmail Irene into marrying him. He does this by arranging a police raid on the Silver Lion where the conspirators meet. The conspirators are known as the Foreign Friends of Freedom. Serganoff abducts Irene but is shot dead by Bim. Irene avoids arrest.

Hay travels to Kiev in June, 1914 where he again encounters Kensky, who gives him a book, The Book of All-Power, that can allegedly turn men into puppets willing to do one's will. Hay also happens to meet Grand-Duchess Irene Yaroslav, a beautiful young Russian woman who values Israel Kensky. Irene becomes an unwitting part of a plot by an ambitious and ruthless Russian prince, Serganoff, and recrosses paths with the American gunman named Cherry Bim.

Several years later, in 1919, during the Russian Revolution and civil war, Hay again encounters Irene, Kensky, and Bim, in very different circumstances. The Czarist regime has been overthrown by the Bolsheviks led by Vladimir Lenin and Leon Trotsky. Hay is imprisoned as an enemy of the Revolution. Irene's former butler Boolba, who has joined the Bolsheviks, is now a person of some importance in Moscow, while Irene is a servant whom Boolba terrorizes. Entrusted with Kensky's coveted Book of All-Power, they must try to escape Russia before they are executed.

Hay, Bim, and Irene are able to escape from Boolba and his men. Bim shoots the blind Boolba dead as they flee to Poland aboard a train. Bim saved the Book of All-Power which he reveals contains English thousand pound notes.

== Publishing history ==
The novel was published by Ward, Lock & Co. in London in 1921. The first edition had an illustrated cover featuring the character Boolba, who is blind.

== Bibliography ==
- Clark, Neil. Stranger than Fiction: The Life of Edgar Wallace, the Man Who Created King Kong. Stroud, UK: The History Press, 2015.
