= Eduardo Asquerino =

Spanish politician, journalist, author and poet

Eduardo Asquerino (1826–1881) was a Spanish politician, journalist, writer and poet. He was the brother of Eusebio Asquerino.
