= Eusebio Asquerino =

Spanish poet and playwright

Eusebio Asquerino (1822–1892) was a Spanish poet and playwright of the romantic era.

His book, Poesías ("Poems", 1870), has a style influenced by José de Espronceda and José Zorilla and some of his work, such as A Lincoln ("To Lincoln", 1865) or El obrero ("The Worker", 1869) reveal progressive leanings.

His plays, written in collaboration with his brother Eduardo, include Doña Urraca (1865), La judía de Toledo ("The Jewess of Toledo", 1843), Casada, vírgen y mártir ("Casada, virgin and martyr", 1843), Españoles sobre todo ("Spaniards Above All" 1844) and Los tesoros del rey ("Treasures of the King", 1850).

== See also ==
- Eduardo Asquerino

== Bibliography ==
- Navas Ruíz, Ricardo, El Romanticismo español, 3rd ed. (Madrid: Cátedra, 1982)
