= Lillian Rozell Messenger =

American poet

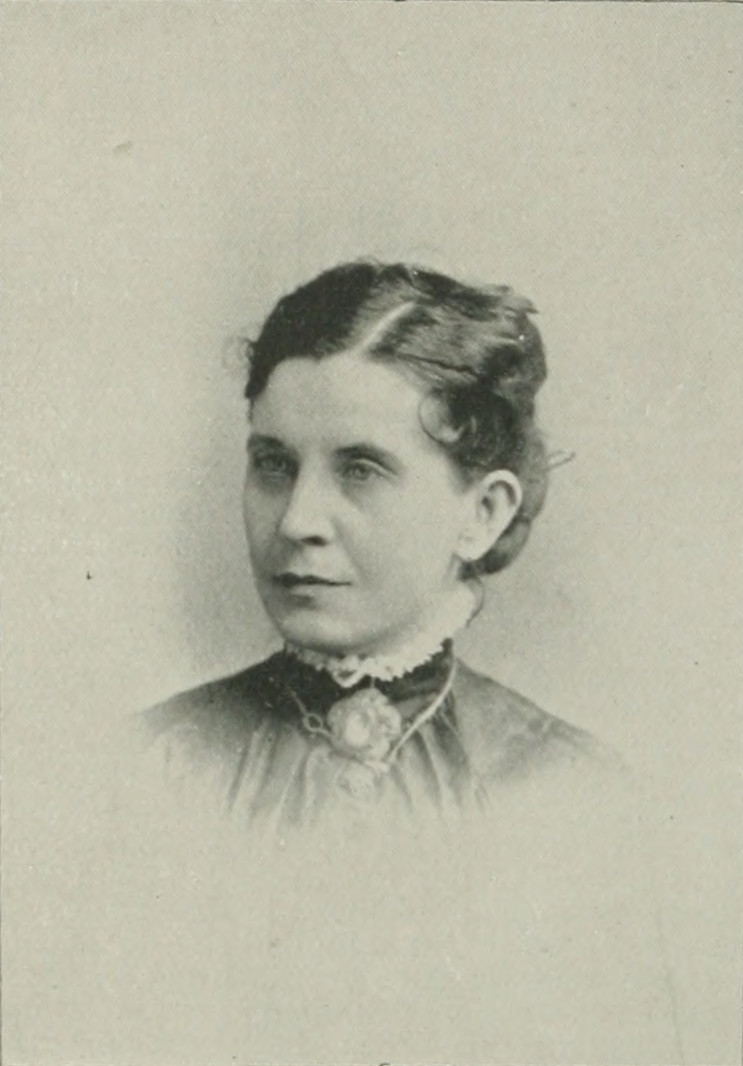
- Photo in A Woman of the Century
- Born: Lillian T. Rozell c. 1843 or c. 1853; Kentucky, U.S.
- Died: October 1, 1921
- Education: Forest Hill Seminary
- Occupation: Poet
- Spouse: North Allen Messenger (m. 1861)
- Children: 1 son
- Writing career
- Pen name: Zena Clifton
- Language: English

Lillian Rozell Messenger (née, Rozell; pen name, Zena Clifton; c. 1843 or 1853 – October 1, 1921) was an American poet from Kentucky. Among her first acknowledged poems were those brought out in a volume entitled, Threads of fate, 1872. Other volumes included Fragments from an old inn, 1885; The Vision of gold, 1886; and The Southern Cross, 1891. "Columbus" was read by Governor John Wesley Hoyt of Wyoming Territory during the patriotic celebration at the Woman's Building, World's Columbian Exposition in Chicago, 1893. In the heart of America, was read at the Cotton States and International Exposition, in Atlanta, 1895. Messenger contributed many poems to the Louisville Journal, Memphis papers, and the New York Home Journal. Her most ambitious poems were lengthy, narrative ones, with themes such as "Charlotte Corday" and "Penelope, the Wife of Ulysses". Messenger was one of the charter members of the Daughters of the American Revolution (DAR).

== Early life and education ==
Lillian T. Rozell was born in Kentucky (Milburn; or Millersburg or Ballard County are recorded) in 1843, 1844, or 1853. Her parents, Dr. Francis Overton and Caroline (Cole) Rozell, were Virginians. The father was a physician who was fond of poetry and music. Her paternal grandfather came from Nice, France, during the Napoleonic Wars and settled in Virginia. Her maternal ancestors were of English descent. All of her family were of a melancholy, sensitive, musical temperament; and Messenger was often and suddenly the victim of depressing melancholy. There were at least three siblings, including a sister, Virginia, and brothers, George and John.

Messenger moved in early life to Arkansas When she was a young child, she delighted in oratory, in climbing hills, and imitating speakers she had heard, in either prose or verse. When not roaming, she loved to fly a kite and to shoot a bow and arrow. From these early years, she was a poet. From reading poetry, she began to write it herself at an early age.

The study of astronomy and natural philosophy dispelled so many fond illusions concerning the mystery of the clouds, that she almost regretted knowledge. Her early education was varied, and her country life made her familiar with nature. Her father died while she was in college. Her education occurred at Forest Hill Seminary, near Memphis, Tennessee, from which she graduated in 1861. It was here, after her father's death, that her poetry first attracted public attention.

Not returning to school after the father's death, she started writing her first verses, the subject being "Night." She was sixteen years old when her first poem was published.

== Career ==
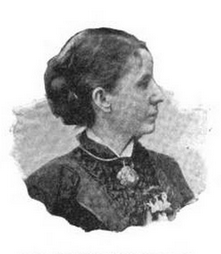
Lillian Rozell Messenger

In the heart of America, 1896

The heroine of the Hudson, 1906

Martha Sawyer Gielow, 1914

While still a school girl, she began her literary career, being encouraged and introduced by M. C. Galloway, Solon Borland, and Geo. D. Prentice. Colonel M. C. Gallaway was Messenger's "Fidus Achates." Her earliest poetry appeared in the Memphis Avalanche, under the nom de plume of "Zena Clifton," but after gaining confidence, she began writing under her own signature.

In 1861, in Pine Bluff, Arkansas, she married North Allen Messenger, a native of Tuscumbia, Alabama, an editor. Their wedded life was brief, only lasting four years, when the husband died. During the American Civil War, when the Federal troops plundered Tuscumbia, they took a journal of manuscripts, principally lyrics, belonging to Messenger. General Dodge tried to recover it, but did not succeed.

For four years, she resided at Tuscumbia, devoting her life to rearing her son, North Overton, and to an active literary career. She removed to Arkansas in 1868, and was the first woman elected to membership in the State press association. Later, she removed to Washington, D.C., where for more than 30 years, she was engaged in general literary work.

Fragments from an Old Inn (New York, G. P. Putnam's Sons) was a collection of prose and poetry, supposed to embody the heart's history of a beautiful, sad woman whom the author met at an old inn. The prose consisted of short paragraphs, generally embracing a single thought; the poems were brief, with such titles as "Old loves. An old story newly told," " A picture," "Autumn," "Disappointment," and so forth. The heroine of the Hudson (and other poems) (Richmond, Virginia, The Hermitage Press, 1906) was dedicated to the National DAR society. Of The Vision of Gold, it was said that there was difficulty in detecting the meaning of her rhapsodies, as they were tangled meshes of rhetorical extravagances. The Southern cross and other poems (1891) included much blank verse. In reviewing it, the Brooklyn Daily Eagle stated that "Hippomennes, or Love's Sacrifice", the longest piece of it, abounded in strong expressions throughout its periods, stronger than congruous in many cases, a kind of mixed strength in the metaphors.

There were several principal poetical works, including "Disappointment," "Importuning," and "Halloween". "Columbus; or, It Was Morning" was first read on July 4, 1893, before the Woman's Building Congresses of the World's Columbian Exposition. Messenger was also a successful dramatic reader.

== Personal life ==
She was one of the charter members of the DAR, and belonged to other patriotic and literary organizations. Music and painting were her favored recreations.

Lillian Rozell Messenger died in Washington, D.C., on October 1, 1921.

== Selected works ==
- 1873, Threads of Fate
- 1885, Fragments from an Old Inn
- 1886, The Vision of Gold and Other Poems
- 1891, The Southern cross and other poems
- 1896, In the heart of America (Richmond, VA, J. L. Hill Company)
- 1906, The Heroine of the Hudson: (and Other Poems)
- 1914, Martha Sawyer Gielow ... A brief resumé of her achievements as author, dramatic reader, and founder of the Southern Industrial Educational Association,
