= Emma Churchman Hewitt =

American author and journalist

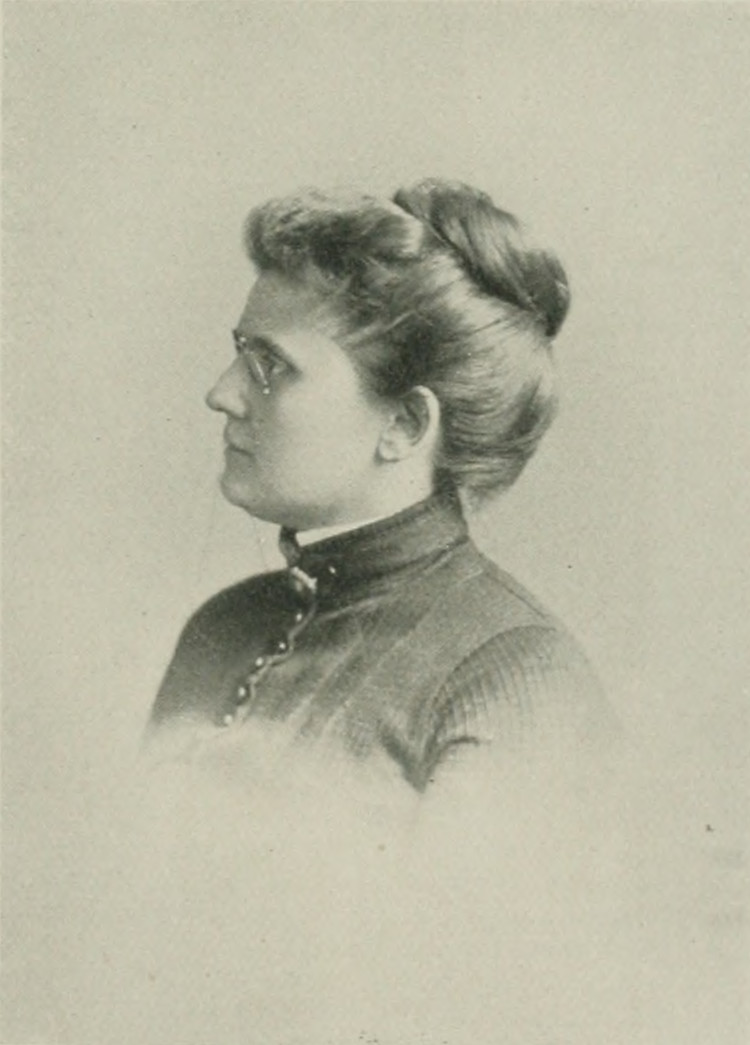
- Photo in A Woman of the Century
- Born: Emma Churchman; February 1, 1850; New Orleans, Louisiana, U.S.
- Died: 1921 (aged 70–71)
- Resting place: Woodlands Cemetery, Philadelphia, Pennsylvania, U.S.
- Education: Miss Churchman's private school
- Occupations: author, journalist
- Spouse: Francis King Hewitt (d. 1898)
- Writing career
- Language: English

Emma Churchman Hewitt (née, Churchman; February 1, 1850 – 1921) was an American author and journalist. She served as associate editor of Ladies' Home Journal for four years; later of Home Magazine in Washington, D.C., and Leisure Hours in Philadelphia. She was also on staff at the Philadelphia (daily) Call. Later, Hewitt was engaged in general literature. She served as president of the Philadelphia Women's Press Association; and was the chairman of the commission on sanitation of the Philadelphia Civic Club. Hewitt was the author of Ease In Conversation, 1887; Hints to Ballad Singers, 18S9; The Little Denvers, 1902; and joint author of Queen of the Home, 1889. She made her residence at 4105 Chester Avenue, Philadelphia.

== Early life and education ==
Emma Churchman was born in New Orleans, Louisiana, February 1, 1850. Her parents were John and Lydia (Starr) Churchman. At three years of age, she moved north with her parents, who settled on a farm in Rahway, New Jersey, afterward moving to Burlington, New Jersey, and later to Camden, New Jersey, where she resided until she moved to West Philadelphia, Pennsylvania. She was a direct descendant of John Churchman, who was a prominent member of Friends.

Hewitt was a graduate of Miss Churchman's private school, in Philadelphia. She was a fluent French scholar, with a knowledge of several other modern languages. She began to write short stories at such an early age that it was said she was "born with a pen in her hand."

== Career ==
In 1884, she became a journalist and engaged with the "Daily Evening Reporter" of Burlington, where she labored until its change of management. In 1885, at the solicitation of the publisher of the Ladies' Home Journal, she began a series of articles with the unique title "Scribbler's Letters to Gustavus Adolphus". The next year, she received a call from the same publisher to the associate-editorship of the journal, which position she filled for four years. Notwithstanding her work while occupying the editor's chair, she contributed regularly sketches, short stories and articles on domestic topics to at least a dozen other periodicals. Her "Kase in Conversation" first appeared in the Ladies' Home Journal under the title of "Mildred's Conversation Class." These articles were published in book form (Philadelphia, 1887), and the volume, entitled "Ease in Conversation," went into a third edition, and her "Hints to Ballad Singers" (Philadelphia, 1889) had an extended sale. Her chief literary work was the "Queen of Home," (Philadelphia, 1889) treating in an exhaustive and masterly manner subjects of household interest from attic to cellar. She contributed from time to time to the Philadelphia Press, the Christian-at-Work, the Sunday-School Times, the Weekly Wisconsin, the Housekeeper, the Ladies' Home Journal, Babyhood, the Home Guard, Golden Days, Our Girls and Boys, Our Young Men, Wide Awake, Munyoti's Illustrated World, Lippincott's Magazine, and a number of others.

She was a regular contributor to several English home magazines and completed a series of papers on household topics for a London periodical. After severing her connection with the Ladies' Home Journal, she accepted a position on the editorial staff of the Home Magazine, published in Washington, D.C., which she was obliged to resign on account of the death of her sister, which compelled her to live in Philadelphia. She then connected with Leisure Hours, a monthly publication in that city.

== Personal life ==
She married Francis King Hewitt (1849–1898). They had a son and a daughter. She died in 1921, and was buried in Woodlands Cemetery, Philadelphia.

== Selected works ==
- Hints to ballad singers ..., 1889
- Queen of home : her reign from infancy to age, from attic to cellar : twelve departments treating of home occupations, nursery, home training, home amusements, social relations, entertainments, library, dress, occupations for women : including papers by eminent authorities on home decorations, infancy, and the sick-room, 1889
- The three little Denvers, 1902
- Ease in conversation; or, hints to the ungrammatical, 1907
- Duryeas' cook book : one hundred and eighty excellent recipes showing the value of Duryeas' cornstarch in the making of thing good to eat, 1909
- How to Train Children, 1909
- How to live on a small income, 1909
- Karo cook book : being one hundred and twenty practical recipes for the use of Karo syrup, 1910
- What a cook ought to know about cornstarch, 1910
