= 1919 in literature =

This article contains information about the literary events and publications of 1919.

== Events ==
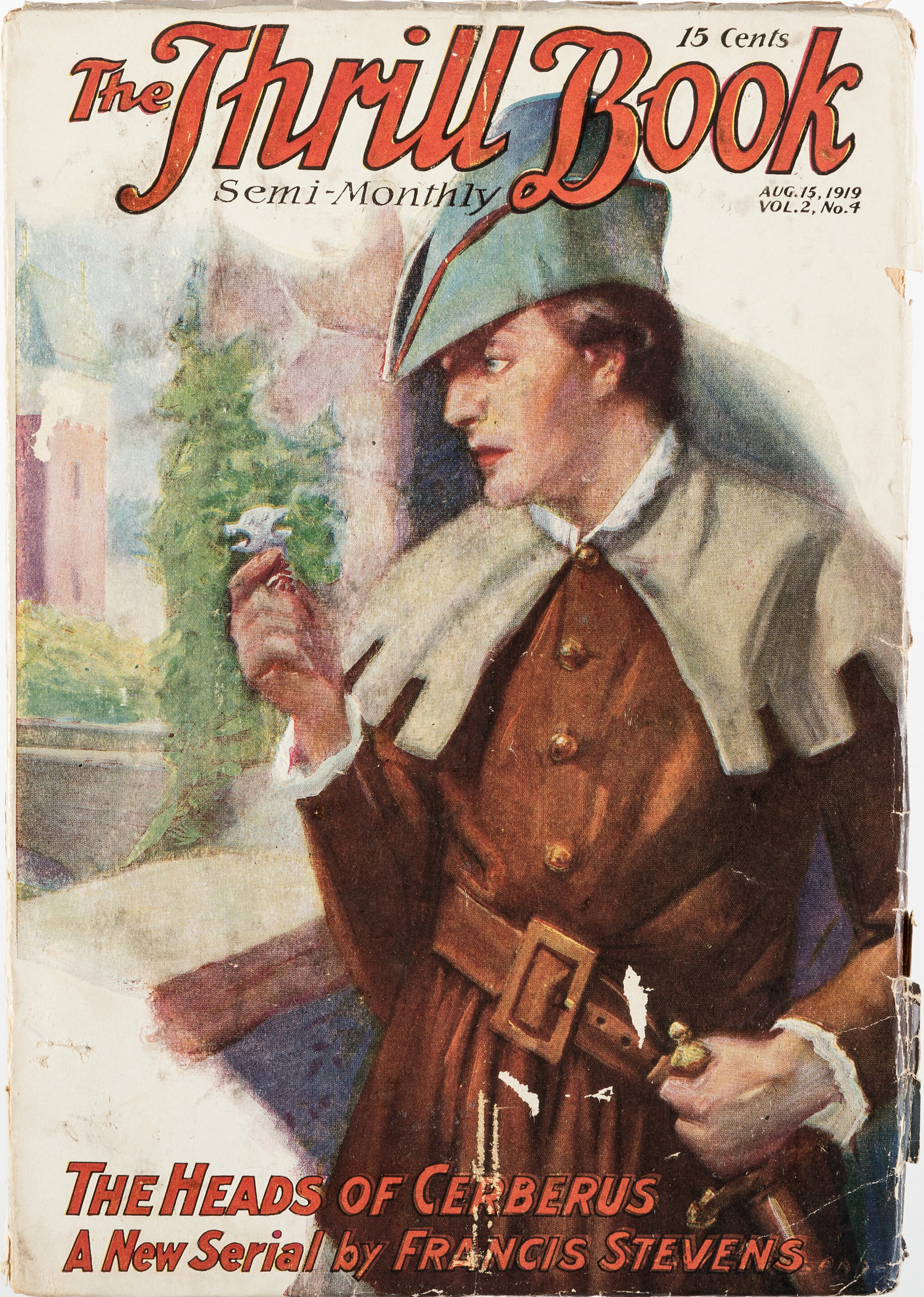
Cover of the August 15, 1919 issue of The Thrill Book; artwork by Sidney H. Riesenberg

- February – Richmal Crompton's anarchic English schoolboy William Brown is introduced in the first published Just William story, "Rice-Mould", in Home magazine.
- March 1 – October 15 – The publication runs of the American pulp magazine The Thrill Book are oriented towards the fantasy genre or science fiction. It includes the serialization of The Heads of Cerberus, written by Gertrude Barrows Bennett as Francis Stevens, with its early thematic use of an alternate time-track, or parallel worlds.
- March – The diaries up to the end of 1917 from the English naturalist W. N. P. Barbellion (Bruce Frederick Cummings) are published as The Journal of a Disappointed Man in London by Chatto & Windus. This treats his resignation to the disease multiple sclerosis, of which he will die on October 22, aged 30, at Gerrards Cross.
- March 28 – Two paintings by E. E. Cummings appear in an exhibition of the New York Society of Independent Artists.
- April 2 – Vladimir Nabokov leaves Russia with his family.
- April 7 – The anarchist writers Gustav Landauer and Erich Mühsam play leading roles in creating the Bavarian Soviet Republic. They are later joined by the essayist and debt relief advocate Silvio Gesell. Taken over by the Communist Party of Germany, the republic is eventually crushed by the Freikorps; Landauer is killed in prison (May 2). Combatants on the Freikorps side include Ernst Kantorowicz, later famous as a historian.
- April and October – The English writers Vera Brittain and Winifred Holtby return after war service to complete their degree courses at Somerville College, Oxford .
- June – The Algonquin Round Table of writers, critics, actors and wits led by Alexander Woollcott first meets at the Algonquin Hotel in New York City.
- July 29 – Alfred Harcourt and Donald Brace set up the publishing company Harcourt, Brace & Howe in New York City.
- August 29 – The State Library (Valsts Bibliotēka) of Latvia, predecessor of the National Library, is founded in Riga based on the collection of its first chief librarian, Jānis Misiņš.
- October 28 – Arthur Ransome leaves Russia with his future wife Evgenia Petrovna Shelepina, previously Trotsky's secretary, carrying a diplomatic message for Estonia.
- November – The literary monthly The London Mercury is launched with J. C. Squire as editor.
- November 19 – An American expatriate, Sylvia Beach, opens the Shakespeare and Company bookstore in Paris.
- November 29 – The Großes Schauspielhaus opens as a theater in Berlin, with an interior designed by Hans Poelzig. It begins with the director Max Reinhardt's production of the Oresteia.
- December – T. E. Lawrence loses most of the manuscript of Seven Pillars of Wisdom while changing trains at Reading in England en route from the Paris Peace Conference to Oxford.
- unknown dates
  - Concetta Brincat (as 'Cornelia Melitesi') writes Il-Familja de Valereux jew Louis Mitluf Ġewwa l-Bosk ("The de Valereux Family, or, Louis Lost in the Woods"), the first known novel by a woman in the Maltese language, although it will not be published until 2025.
  - The column "By the Way" and the pen name Beachcomber in the London newspaper the Daily Express are taken over by D. B. Wyndham Lewis as a humorous feature.
  - Singer House in Petrograd (Russian Soviet Federative Socialist Republic) is allocated to the Petrograd State Publishing House, quickly becoming the city's largest bookstore. It will be known subsequently as Дом Книги (Dom knigi, "The House of Books").

== New books ==
=== Fiction ===
- Ryūnosuke Akutagawa (芥川 龍之介) – "Dragon: the Old Potter's Tale" (龍, Ryū, published in Akutagawa Ryūnosuke zenshū)
- Sherwood Anderson – Winesburg, Ohio
- Daisy Ashford – The Young Visiters (written in 1890 aged nine)
- Pio Baroja – Caesar or Nothing
- Max Beerbohm – Seven Men (short stories)
- André Breton and Philippe Soupault – Les Champs Magnétiques (first book to use techniques of surrealist automatism)
- James Branch Cabell – Jurgen, A Comedy of Justice
- Henry de Montherlant – Songe (Dream)
- Ronald Firbank – Valmouth
- Gilbert Frankau – Peter Jackson, Cigar Merchant: a romance of married life
- Philip Gibbs – The Street of Adventure
- André Gide – La Symphonie pastorale
- A. P. Herbert – The Secret Battle
- Joseph Hergesheimer
  - Linda Condon
  - Java Head
- Hermann Hesse (as Emil Sinclair) – Demian
- E. M. Hull – The Sheik
- Jerome K. Jerome – All Roads Lead to Calvary
- Franz Kafka – "In the Penal Colony" ("In der Strafkolonie")
- Halldór Laxness – "Barn náttúrunnar"
- Jack London – On the Makaloa Mat
- Compton Mackenzie
  - Poor Relations
  - Sylvia and Michael
- Thomas Mann – Herr und Hund (A Man and his Dog)
- W. Somerset Maugham – The Moon and Sixpence
- Christopher Morley – The Haunted Bookshop
- Seumas O'Kelly (died 1918) – The Golden Barque and The Weaver's Grave (novellas)
- Baroness Orczy
  - His Majesty's Well-beloved
  - The League of the Scarlet Pimpernel
- Premchand – Seva Sadan
- Marcel Proust
  - À l'Ombre des jeunes filles en fleurs (In the Shadow of Young Girls in Flower or Within a Budding Grove), vol. 2 of À la recherche du temps perdu
  - Pastiches et mélanges
- Romain Rolland
  - Colas Breugnon
  - Les Précurseurs (The Forerunners)
- Henry De Vere Stacpoole – The Beach of Dreams
- Ivan Tavčar – Visoška kronika (The Visoko Chronicle, novella)
- Edgar Wallace – The Green Rust
- Mary Augusta Ward
  - Fields of Victory
  - Helena
- Anna Elisabet Weirauch – The Scorpion (Der Skorpion) (vol. 1)
- George McLeod Winsor – Station X
- P. G. Wodehouse – My Man Jeeves (collection)
- Virginia Woolf – Night and Day
- Francis Brett Young – The Young Physician

=== Children and young people ===
- L. Frank Baum – The Magic of Oz
- Edgar Rice Burroughs – Jungle Tales of Tarzan
- Christine Chaundler – Ronald's Burglar
- Grace May North – Adele Doring of the Sunnyside Club (first in the Adele Doring series)
- Else Ury – Nesthäkchen's Teenage Years
- Hugh Walpole – Jeremy

=== Drama ===
- Ramón del Valle-Inclán – Divine Words (Divinas palabras)
- Edward Salisbury Field – Wedding Bells
- John Galsworthy – The First and the Last
- Susan Glaspell – Bernice
- Harley Granville-Barker – The Secret Life
- Ian Hay – Tilly of Bloomsbury
- Robert Hichens – The Voice from the Minaret
- Avery Hopwood – The Gold Diggers
- Karl Kraus – The Last Days of Mankind (Die letzten Tage der Menschheit)
- Kwee Tek Hoay – Allah jang Palsoe (The False God)
- Else Lasker-Schüler – Die Wupper (The (river) Wupper; first performed, written 1908)
- H. F. Maltby – A Temporary Gentleman
- W. Somerset Maugham – Caesar's Wife
- A. A. Milne
  - The Camberley Triangle
  - Mr. Pim Passes By
- Louis N. Parker – Summertime
- Liviu Rebreanu – The Quadrille
- Ernst Toller – Transformation

=== Poetry ===
- E. J. Brady – The House of the Winds
- Uri Zvi Greenberg – In tsaytns roysh (In the tumult of the times, verse and prose)
- Siegfried Sassoon – The War Poems of Siegfried Sassoon
- August Stramm (killed in action 1915) – Tropfblut
- Giuseppe Ungaretti
  - Allegria di naufragi (The Joy of Shipwrecks)
  - La guerra (The War)
- Louis Untermeyer (ed.) – Modern American Poetry

=== Non-fiction ===
- Henri Bergson – L'Energie spirituelle: essais et conférences (Spiritual Energy: Essays and Lectures)
- Francis P. Duffy with Joyce Kilmer – Father Duffy's Story: A Tale of Humor and Heroism, Of Life and Death with the Fighting Sixty-Ninth
- Johan Huizinga – The Waning of the Middle Ages (Herfsttij der Middeleeuwen)
- William Inge – Outspoken Essays (first series)
- John Maynard Keynes – The Economic Consequences of the Peace
- Karl Kraus – Weltgericht (Last Judgment)
- Dorothy Lawrence – Sapper Dorothy Lawrence: The Only English Woman Soldier (autobiography)
- H. L. Mencken – The American Language
- Arthur Ransome – Six Weeks in Russia 1919
- John Reed – Ten Days That Shook the World
- Carl Sandburg – The Chicago Race Riots, July 1919
- Ruth Elizabeth Spence — Prohibition in Canada: A Memorial to Francis Stephens Spence
- Prof. William Strunk, Jr. – The Elements of Style
- H. G. Wells – The Outline of History (publication of first installment, November 22)
- Arthur Graeme West (killed on active service 1917) – The Diary of a Dead Officer
- Frances Garnet Wolseley, 2nd Viscountess Wolseley – Gardens, their Form and Design

== Births ==
- January 1 – J. D. Salinger, American novelist (died 2010)
- January 7 – Robert Duncan, American poet (died 1988)
- January 10 – Ugo Sansonetti, Italian writer and masters athlete (died 2019)
- January 20 – Silva Kaputikyan, Armenian poet (died 2006)
- January 24 – Juan Eduardo Zúñiga, Spanish fiction writer, literary scholar and translator (died 2020)
- January 25 – Edwin Newman, American writer and journalist (died 2010)
- January 29 – N. F. Simpson, English absurdist playwright (died 2011)
- February 14 – Miroslav Zikmund, Czech adventurer, travel writer and film director (died 2021)
- March 18 – G. E. M. Anscombe, Irish-born English analytic philosopher (died 2001)
- March 24
  - Lawrence Ferlinghetti, American beat poet, writer, publisher, painter, socialist activist and bookseller (died 2021)
  - Robert Heilbroner, American economic philosopher (died 2005)
  - Graciela Palau de Nemes, Cuban-born literary critic (died 2019)
- April 15 – Emyr Humphreys, Welsh novelist and poet (died 2020)
- April 24 – Mihu Dragomir, Romanian poet, journalist and short story writer (died 1964)
- May 7 – Robert H. Adleman, American novelist and historian (died 1995)
- May 16 – John Robinson, English Bible scholar, religious writer and bishop (died 1983)
- May 17 – Merle Miller, American biographer and screenwriter (died 1986)
- June 6 – Helen Forrester (June Bhatia), English memoirist and novelist (died 2011)
- June 8 – Władysław Siemaszko, Polish publicist, lawyer and writer (died 2025)
- June 27 – Jaswant Singh Kanwal, Punjabi novelist (died 2020)
- June 28 – Ion Dezideriu Sîrbu, Romanian philosopher, novelist and dramatist (died 1989)
- July 9 – Denys Rhodes, Irish-born novelist (died 1981)
- July 15 – Iris Murdoch, Irish-born novelist (died 1999)
- July 23
  - Davis Grubb, American novelist and short story writer (died 1980)
  - Héctor Germán Oesterheld, Argentine comic book writer (forced disappearance c.1977)
- July 31 – Primo Levi, Italian novelist and memoirist (died 1987)
- August 1 – Stanley Middleton, English novelist (died 2009)
- August 4 – Michel Déon, French writer (died 2016)
- August 31 – Amrita Pritam, Punjabi poet and novelist (died 2005)
- September 13
  - Mary Midgley, English philosopher (died 2018)
  - George Weidenfeld, Viennese-born English publisher (died 2016)
- September 23 – Tōta Kaneko, Japanese writer (died 2018)
- September 26 – Matilde Camus, Spanish poet (died 2012)
- October 22 – Doris Lessing, Persian-born English novelist (died 2013)
- November 18 – Jocelyn Brando, American actress and writer (died 2005)
- November 23 – P. F. Strawson, English philosopher (died 2006)
- November 26 – Frederik Pohl, American science fiction author (died 2013)
- November 29 – Frank Kermode, Manx-born literary critic (died 2010)
- December 6 – Paul de Man, Belgian-born literary critic (died 1983)
- December 17
  - Charlotte Jay, Australian suspense writer (died 1996)
  - Es'kia Mphahlele, South African writer (died 2008)

== Deaths ==
- January 2 – Eliza Putnam Heaton, American journalist and editor (born 1860)
- January 4 – Matilda Betham-Edwards, English novelist, poet and travel writer (born 1836)
- January 11 – Kazimierz Zalewski, Polish dramatist, critic and publisher (born 1849)
- January 15 – Rosa Luxemburg, Polish-born German revolutionary socialist (assassinated, born 1871)
- January 31 – Paul Lindau, German dramatist (born 1839)
- February 24 – Mary Ann Maitland, Scottish-born Canadian author (born 1839)
- February 26 – Anne Thackeray Ritchie, English novelist and essayist (born 1837)
- May 2 – Gustav Landauer, German philosopher and revolutionary (murdered, born 1870)
- May 6 – L. Frank Baum, children's writer (stroke, born 1856)
- May 10 – Ferdinando Fontana, Italian journalist, dramatist, and poet (born 1850)
- May 17 – Guido von List, Viennese poet, dramatist, and occultist (born 1848)
- May 30 – Barbu Nemțeanu, Romanian poet and translator (tuberculosis, born 1887)
- June 14 – Weedon Grossmith, English writer, actor and playwright (born 1854)
- June 19 – Petre P. Carp, Romanian politician, polemicist, and translator (born 1837)
- June 23 – Kolachalam Srinivasa Rao, Indian dramatist (born 1854)
- July 8 – John Fox, Jr., American novelist and short story writer (pneumonia, born 1862)
- August 6 – Ada Langworthy Collier, American author (born 1843)
- August 10 – Cynthia Morgan St. John, American Wordsworthian, book collector, and author (pneumonia, born 1852)
- August 11 – Andrew Carnegie, Scottish American industrialist and writer (pneumonia, born 1835)
- September 12 – Leonid Andreyev, Russian dramatist, novelist and short-story writer (heart failure, born 1871)
- October 22 – W. N. P. Barbellion (Bruce Frederick Cummings), English naturalist and diarist (multiple sclerosis, born 1889)
- October 30 – Ella Wheeler Wilcox, American author and poet (born 1850)
- November 3 – Abraham Valdelomar, Peruvian poet, essayist and dramatist (accidental fall, born 1888)
- November 20 – Jane Lippitt Patterson, American writer and editor (born 1829)
- December 19 – Alice Moore McComas, American author, editor, lecturer and reformer (born 1850)

== Awards ==
- James Tait Black Memorial Prize for fiction (first award): Hugh Walpole, The Secret City
- James Tait Black Memorial Prize for biography (first award): Henry Festing Jones, Samuel Butler, Author of Erewhon (1835–1902) – A Memoir
- Nobel Prize for Literature: Carl Spitteler
- Prix Goncourt: Marcel Proust, A l'ombre des jeunes filles en fleurs
- Pulitzer Prize for Biography or Autobiography: Henry Brooks Adams, The Education of Henry Adams
- Pulitzer Prize for Drama: no award given
- Pulitzer Prize for Poetry: Margaret Widdemer, Old Road to Paradise and Carl Sandburg, Corn Huskers
- Pulitzer Prize for the Novel: Booth Tarkington, The Magnificent Ambersons

== In literature ==
- Opening of J. G. Farrell's novel Troubles (1970)

== Sources ==
- Bleiler, Richard (1991). The Annotated Index to The Thrill Book. Mercer Island, Washington: Starmont House, Inc. ISBN 1-55742-205-2. ISSN 0738-0127.
