= Shevchenko Days =

Cultural holiday in Ukraine

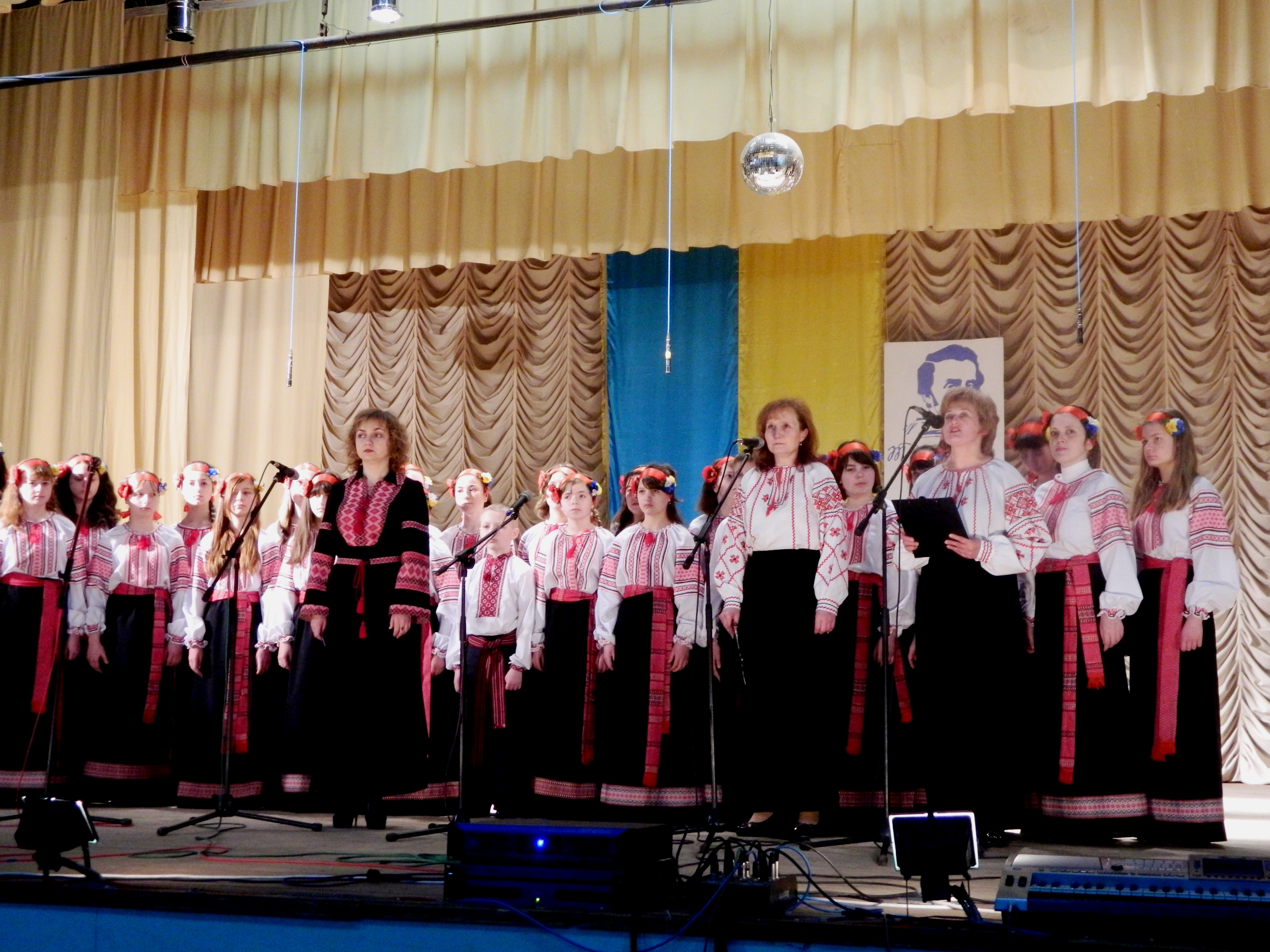
- A memorial concert dedicated to Taras Shevchenko's 200th anniversary in Mlyniv
- Observed by: Ukrainians
- Type: Cultural
- Significance: Birth and death anniversaries of Taras Shevchenko
- Celebrations: recitation of works by Shevchenko, teaching of classes on Shevchenko
- Date: 9–10 March; 22 May (historic alternative date)

The Shevchenko Days (Ukrainian: Шевченківські дні, romanized: Shevchenkivski dni, lit. 'days of Shevchenko') are an unofficial holiday in Ukraine, commemorating the anniversary of poet and activist Taras Shevchenko's birth and death. Lasting from 9 March into the following day, the Shevchenko Days are typically commemorated by public readings of Shevchenko's literary works and teaching of classes on Shevchenko. The holiday was formalized as a national celebration under the Ukrainian People's Republic, and later retained this status in the Ukrainian Soviet Socialist Republic and modern-day Ukraine.

== Background ==
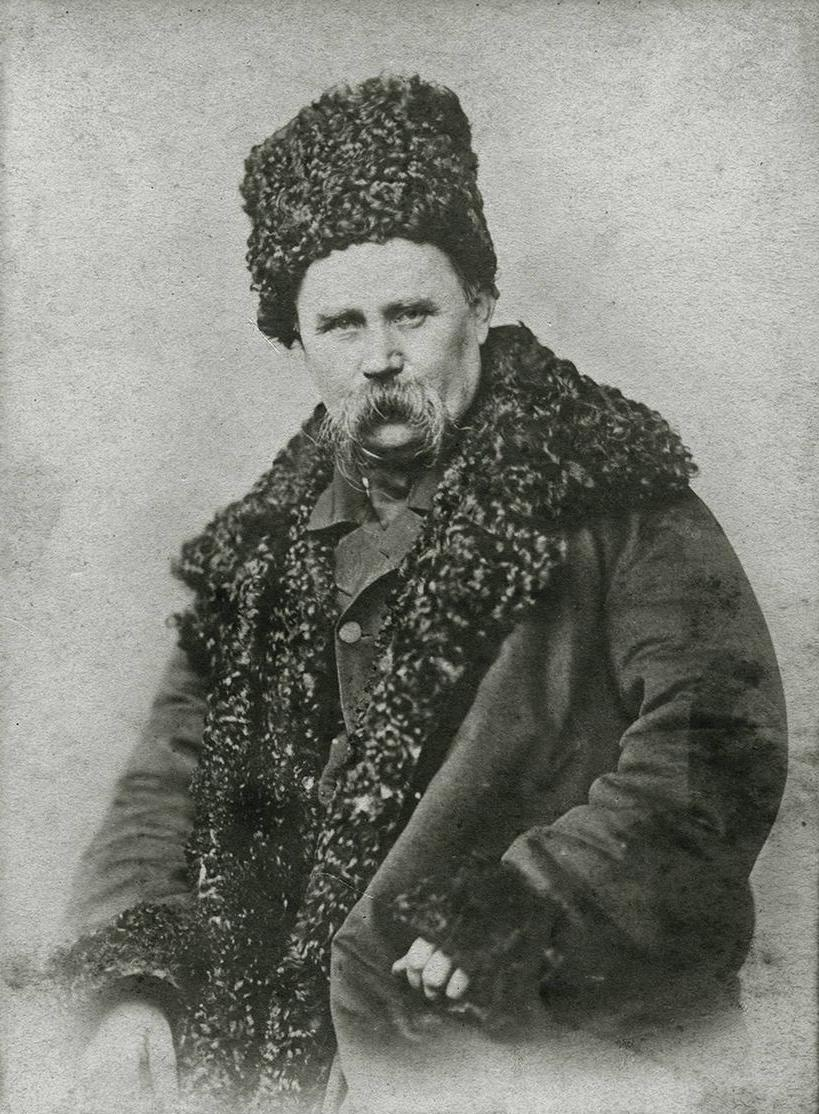
Taras Shevchenko

Taras Shevchenko (1814–1861) was a Ukrainian Romantic poet, writer, artist and activist whose career flourished under the Russian Empire. Shevchenko played a significant role in the development of Ukrainian culture in the face of Russification, and since his death he has been recognised as Ukraine's national poet. Shevchenko's influence on Ukrainian culture has been described by University of Cambridge professor Rory Finnin as "perhaps only second to Shakespeare" among writers globally, while Ukrainian literary historian Yurii Boiko-Blokhin wrote in 1955 that Shevchenko, distinctly among writers, was a symbol of Ukraine's "national essence" to an extent unsurpassed in Europe except by Homer in Greece and Virgil in the Roman Empire.

== History ==
=== Early years ===
Following the reburial of Shevchenko's remains on Chernecha Hill in Kaniv on 22 May 1861, the site became a point of annual pilgrimage by Ukrainian cultural activists, including members of the Taras Brotherhood, who gathered there in the summer of 1891. Initially, the poet's memory would be celebrated both in March, when he was born and died, and in May, on the anniversary of his burial. Already before the First World War, the celebration of Shevchenko Days was popularized by members of inteligentsia on both sides of the Zbruch river, which divided Ukrainian-populated lands ruled by the Russian and Austrian Empires. Starting from 1886, Shevchenko Days were annually celebrated at the Lviv Academic Gymnasium.

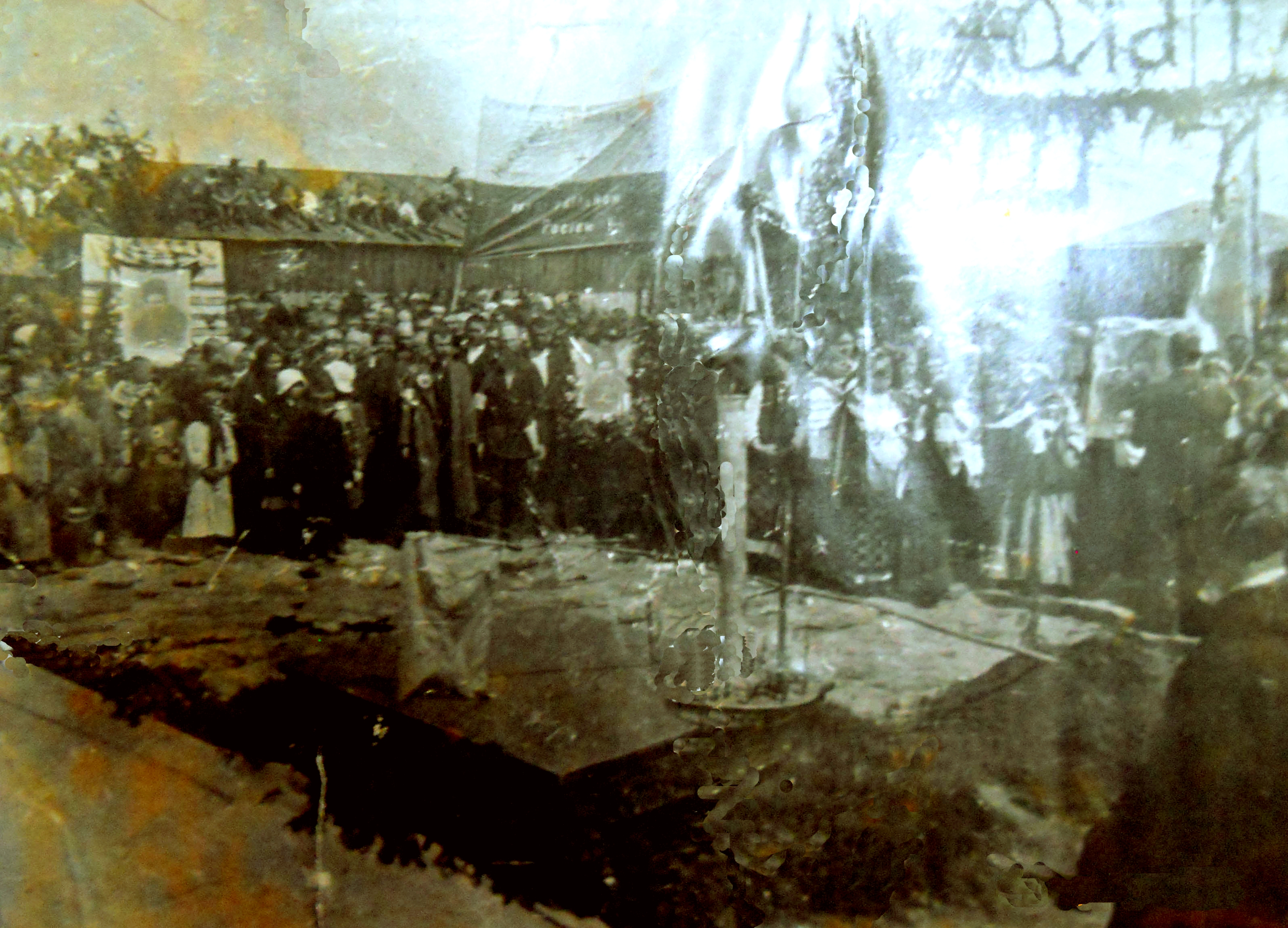
An early celebration of Shevchenko Days in Havrontsi, 1917

Shevchenko's centenary in March 1914 took place under pressure from Russian imperial authorities and nationalist circles, with students and theology professors being banned from taking part in the event by the Ministry of Education and Most Holy Synod. Numerous participants of the festivities were detained by the police in Kyiv.

Commemoration of the Shevchenko Days as an official holiday began in 1918, under the Ukrainian People's Republic. At a 6 March [O.S. 21 February] 1918 meeting of the Council of People's Ministers chaired by Prime Minister Vsevolod Holubovych it was decided that 11 March would be a state holiday honouring Shevchenko. According to the directive, all government institutions were to be closed, all schools were to hold classes only involving Shevchenko during the holiday, government institutions were to be decorated with flags, and a performance at the Kyiv Opera House was to be conducted on a yearly basis. The celebration was named the "Holiday of Shevchenko" (Ukrainian: Шевченківське свято, romanized: Shevchenkivske sviato).

=== Under the Soviet rule ===
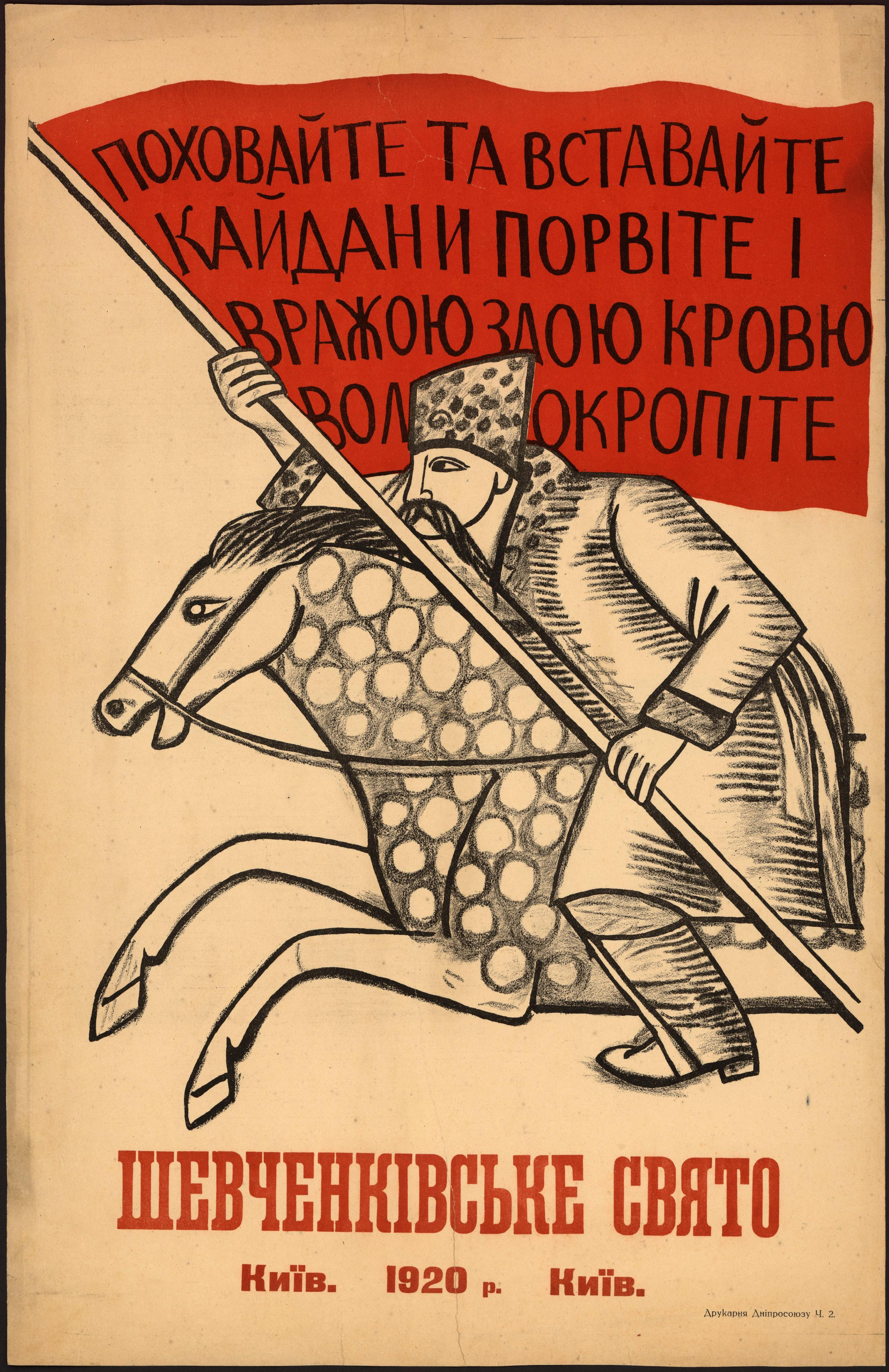
A 1920 poster dedicated to Shevchenko Days created by Mykhailo Boychuk in Soviet Ukraine

A year after the Ukrainian People's Republic proclaimed Shevchenko Day to be a holiday, the Ukrainian Soviet Socialist Republic did the same. Many provisions in the Soviet Ukrainian decree were similar to that of the Ukrainian People's Republic, including classes only involving Shevchenko. The Ukrainian SSR celebrated the holiday with a literary exhibition on the Khreshchatyk.

After the Ukrainian–Soviet War and the establishment of the Soviet Union the Shevchenko Days continued to be celebrated in Ukraine. From 1938 to 1964 the Soviet government participated in celebrations, with particular attention devoted to 150th anniversary of Shevchenko's birth in 1964.

Ukrainian Soviet dissidents also frequently used the Shevchenko Days to express their support of Ukrainian culture and separateness from Russia. Viacheslav Chornovil's time as a Soviet dissident began with a speech at Kyiv Hydroelectric Power Plant during the 1964 Shevchenko Days celebrations, when he attributed to Shevchenko the belief that "every system built on the oppression of man by man, on contempt for human dignity and inalienable human rights, on the suppression of free, human thoughts, on the oppression of one nation by another nation, and in whatever new form it may hide – it is against human nature, and must be destroyed."

In order to separate their celebrations from official state commemorations which took place on 9 March, dissidents would commemorate the poet on 22 May, the day of Shevchenko's burial. Such celebrations were tightly controlled by Soviet KGB, which would attempt to disrupt the events and detain their participants. One of such arrests in May 1967 led to a mass public protest in front of the Central Committee building in Kyiv. Many of Shevchenko's poetic lines would be employed as mottos of the anti-Soviet liberation movement.

In 1973 another unsanctioned celebration of Shevchenko Days by students was disrupted by the KGB at Lviv University. According to The Ukrainian Herald, between 1972 and 1974 public commemorations of Shevchenko were prohibited by Soviet Ukrainian authorities, with only formal memorial events by government loyalists being permitted.

=== Outside of Soviet Ukraine ===
Ukrainian Canadians celebrating Shevchenko Days in 1938

In Eastern Galicia under the Polish rule, Shevchenko Days served as an important event in life of the Ukrainian community. In some cases, ethnic Poles and Jews would attend the celebrations along with Ukrainians.

Following the defeat of the Ukrainian People's Republic in the Ukrainian–Soviet War the Ukrainian diaspora continued to celebrate the Shevchenko Days, including Ukrainian soldiers interned in Poland and Czechoslovakia. In 1922 a concert dedicated to the 64th anniversary of Shevchenko's death was celebrated by members of the Ukrainian Prosvita society in Zagreb. Shevchenko Days have also been traditionally celebrated by Ukrainian emigrants in Canada.

After the Second World War, the tradition was also introduced by members of the Ukrainian diaspora in Kraków, Poland. Ukrainians residing in displaced persons camps following the end of the war would likewise organize the celebration of Shevchenko Days.

A post stamp dedicated to Shevchenko's 200th anniversary in 2014

== Commemorations in present-day Ukraine ==
Since the 1989–1991 Ukrainian revolution that brought Ukraine independence from the Soviet Union, the Shevchenko Days have received official support as a cultural holiday. The tradition of schoolchildren reciting Shevchenko's works in schools, performed under the Ukrainian People's Republic, has been revived and remains popular. Shevchenko is also recited at events and in the Verkhovna Rada (parliament of Ukraine) during the holiday.

9 March, the anniversary of Shevchenko's birth, also serves as the date on which Shevchenko National Prize is awarded by the President of Ukraine. Some Ukrainian political parties have scheduled their political demonstrations for Shevchenko Days in order to mobilize patriotic supporters.

== See also ==
- Public holidays in Ukraine
- Burns day
