= Michel de Tarnowski =

French painter

- Born: 20 April 1870; France, Nice
- Died: May 1946
- Education: Jules Dalou, Alexandre Falguière
- Children: Françoise de Tarnowsky

Michel de Tarnowski (pol. Michał Tarnowski, en. Michel de Tarnowsky; April 20, 1870 – May 1946) was a French sculptor of Polish descent.

== Biography ==
de Tarnowski was born in Nice. He was the eldest son of five children of Michel Wasilienitch de Tarnowsky, a doctor who emigrated from Russia to Germany and then to France, and settled in Nice, where he married in 1869 with a young American painter Juliana Oakley. The younger Michel studied at École Nationale des Arts Décoratifs in Villa Arson in Nice and in Paris, where his masters were Julesa Dalou and J.A. Falguière’a. In 1894-1902 he exhibited at Salon des artistes français, (he won médaille vermeille in 1899), and on the World Exhibition (distinctions at the exhibition in 1895 and 1900). In 1902-1910 he was a professor of sculpture at the New York University Institute of Fine Arts. Michael made a number of private persons' busts and exhibited in Madison Square Garden in 1903. He returned to France in 1910. After return he made among others sculptures on fronton of prefecture of Nice, and March 23, 1912 he signed contract with hotel Negresco in Nice. During World War I he was Military interpreter at British Army in France, and reward him Military Cross and Legion of Honour. In the latter part of World War I he made several sculptures for monuments of deceaseds of communes of Nice: (Cimiez), Moirans, Cannes i Sainte-Menehould. Circa 1939 he stopped every activity in result of blindness, and died in 1946. The street in Nice was named: Rue Michel de Tarnowski.

== More known works ==
- Bust of a child ( Buste d'enfant , Amiens, Musée de Picardie);
- Statue of Paul Déroulède ( Monument à Paul Déroulède , 1921, stone; Nice);
- Two friends ( Les deux Amis , colored plaster, 1901, Nice,);
- Surprise ( Surprise, (1910, marble, Nicea,);
- Marie Bashkirtseff , (1914, plaster, project of the monument, Nice).
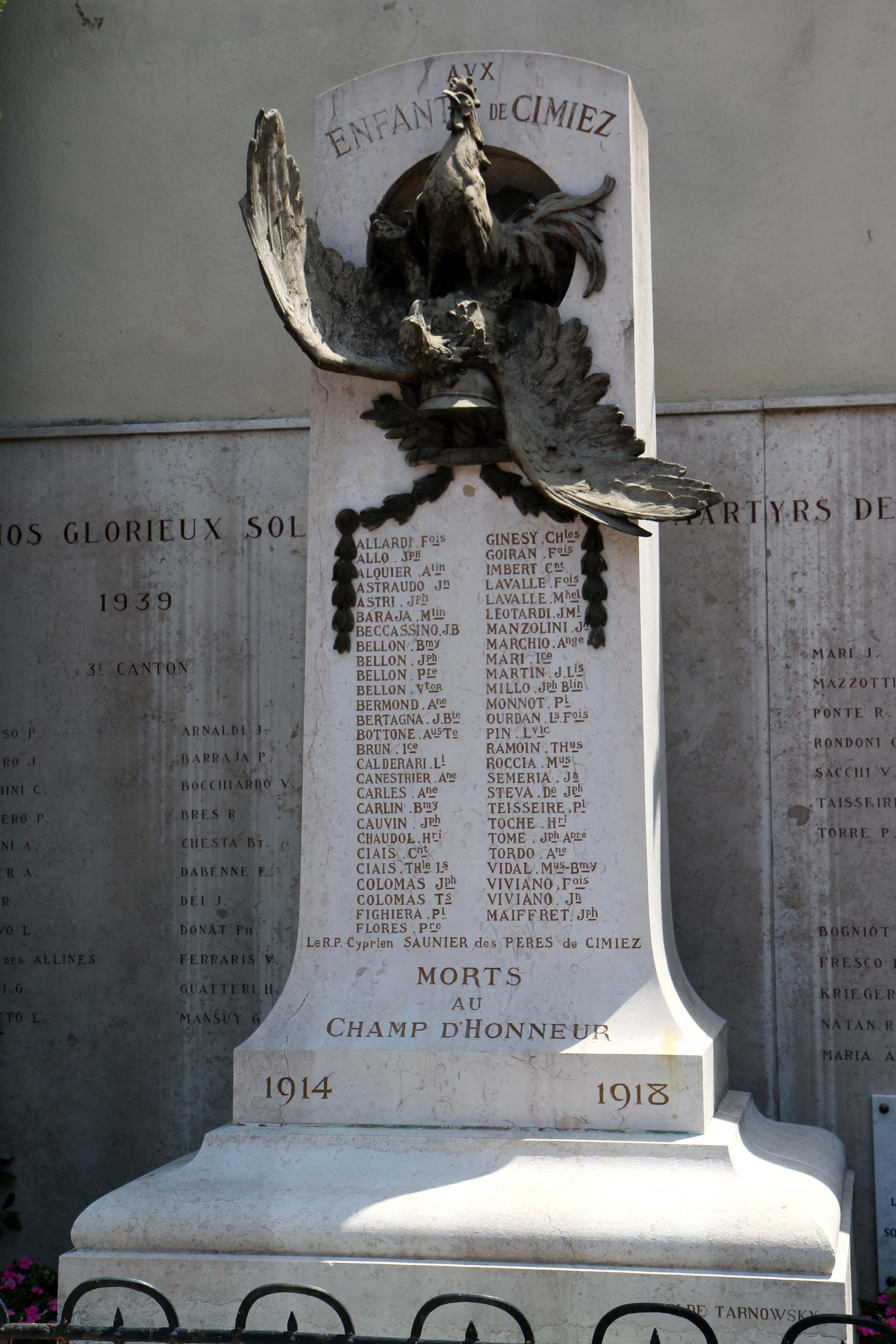
Monuments of the Deads in Cimiez ( Monument aux morts de Cimiez )

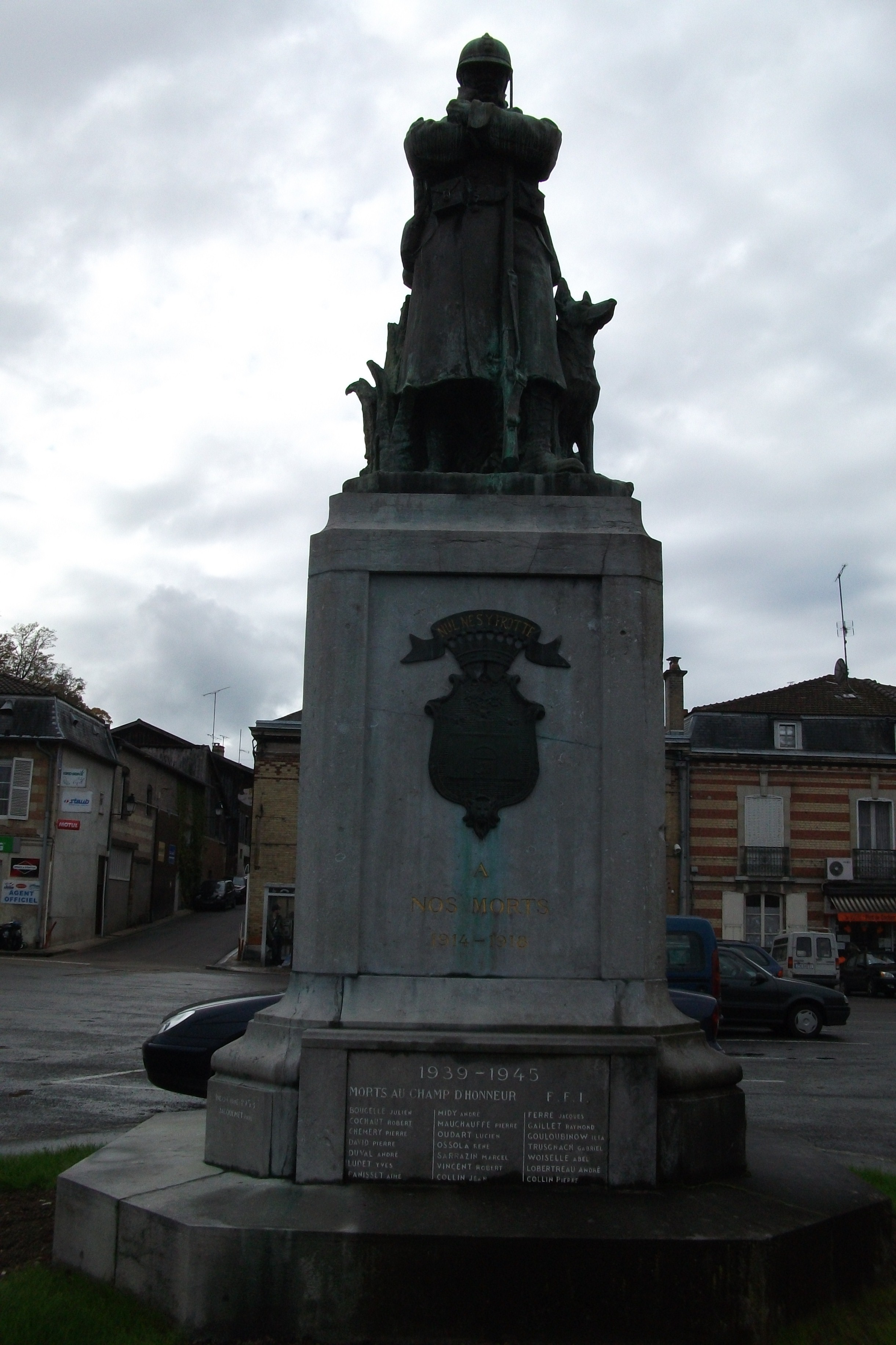
Monuments of the Deaths in Sainte-Menehould ( Monument aux morts de Sainte-Menehould , ok. 1880)

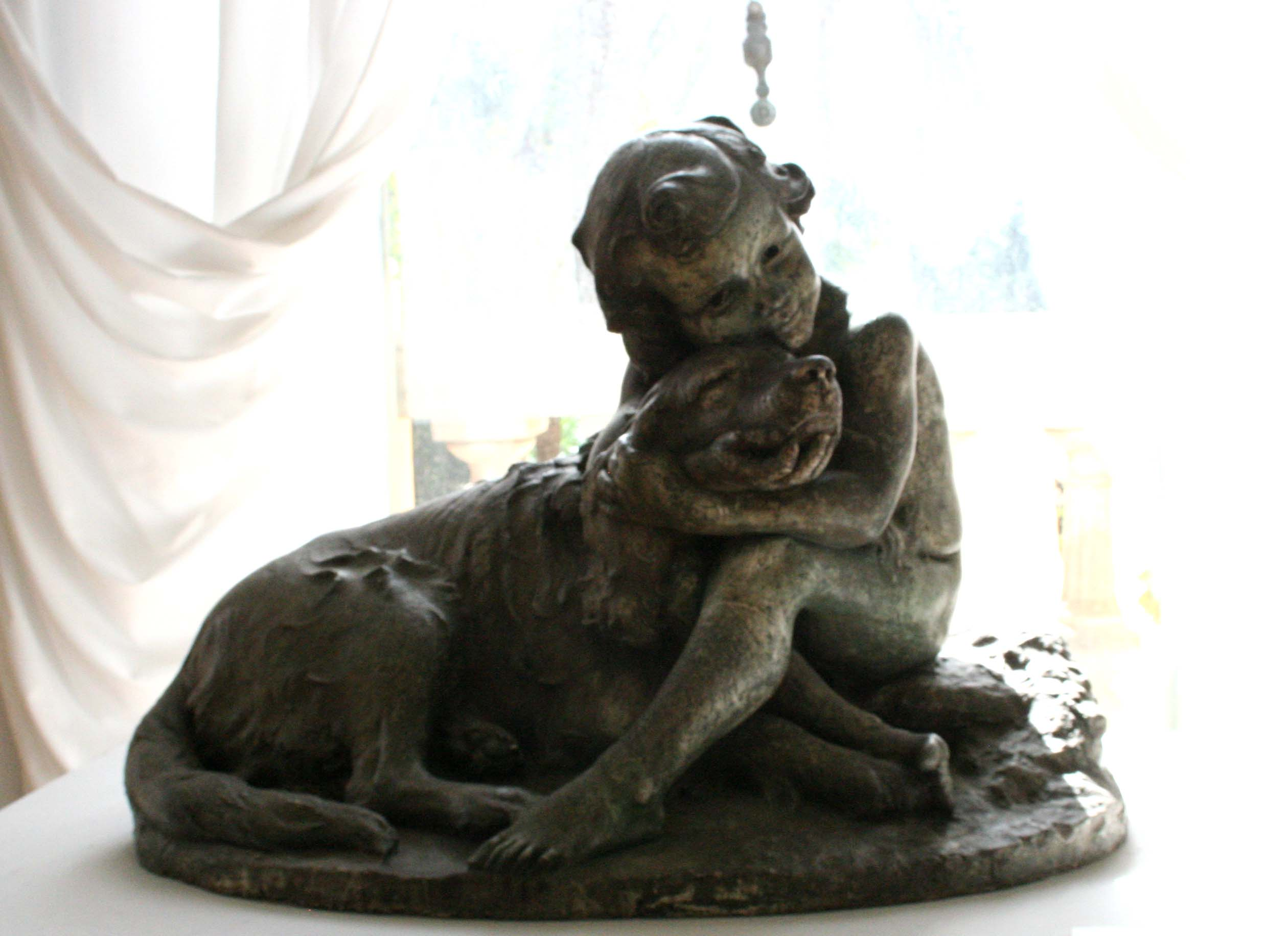
Two friends ( Les deux Amis )

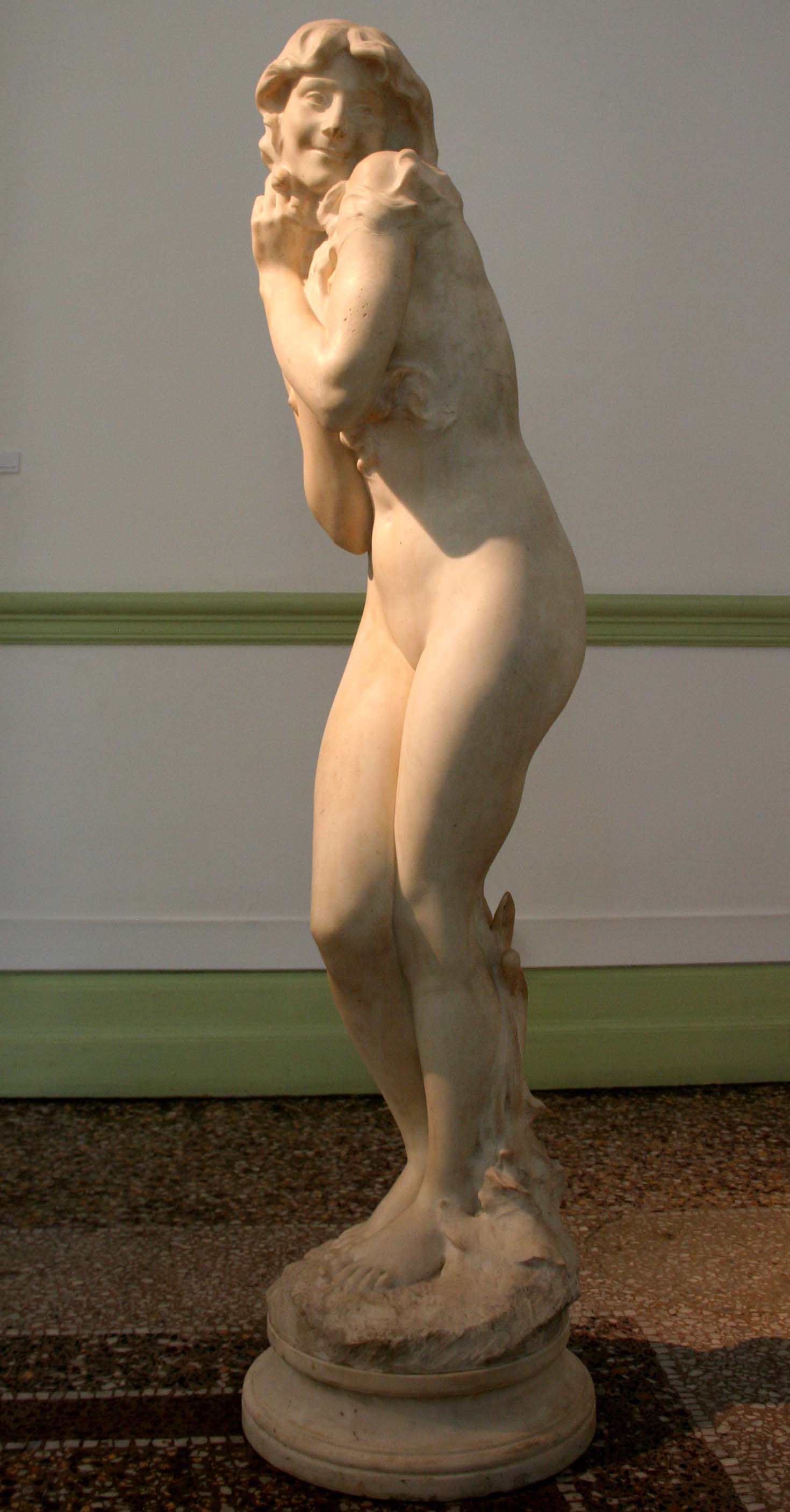
Surprise ( La Surprise )

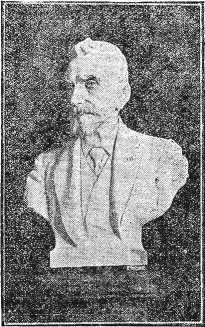
Joseph Durandy

== See also ==
- Villa La Belle Époque
