= Station X =

Station X may refer to:

- Station X, 1919 novel by George McLeod Winsor
- Station X, code name for a codebreaking site at Bletchley Park during World War II
- Station X (UK TV series), a 1999 UK TV documentary about code-breaking at Bletchley Park
- Station X (Canadian TV series), a 2005 animated series about six young people produced by Teletoon
