= Villa La Belle Époque =

Historic mansion in Nice, Alpes-Maritimes, France

Coordinates: 43.6970°N 7.2578°E

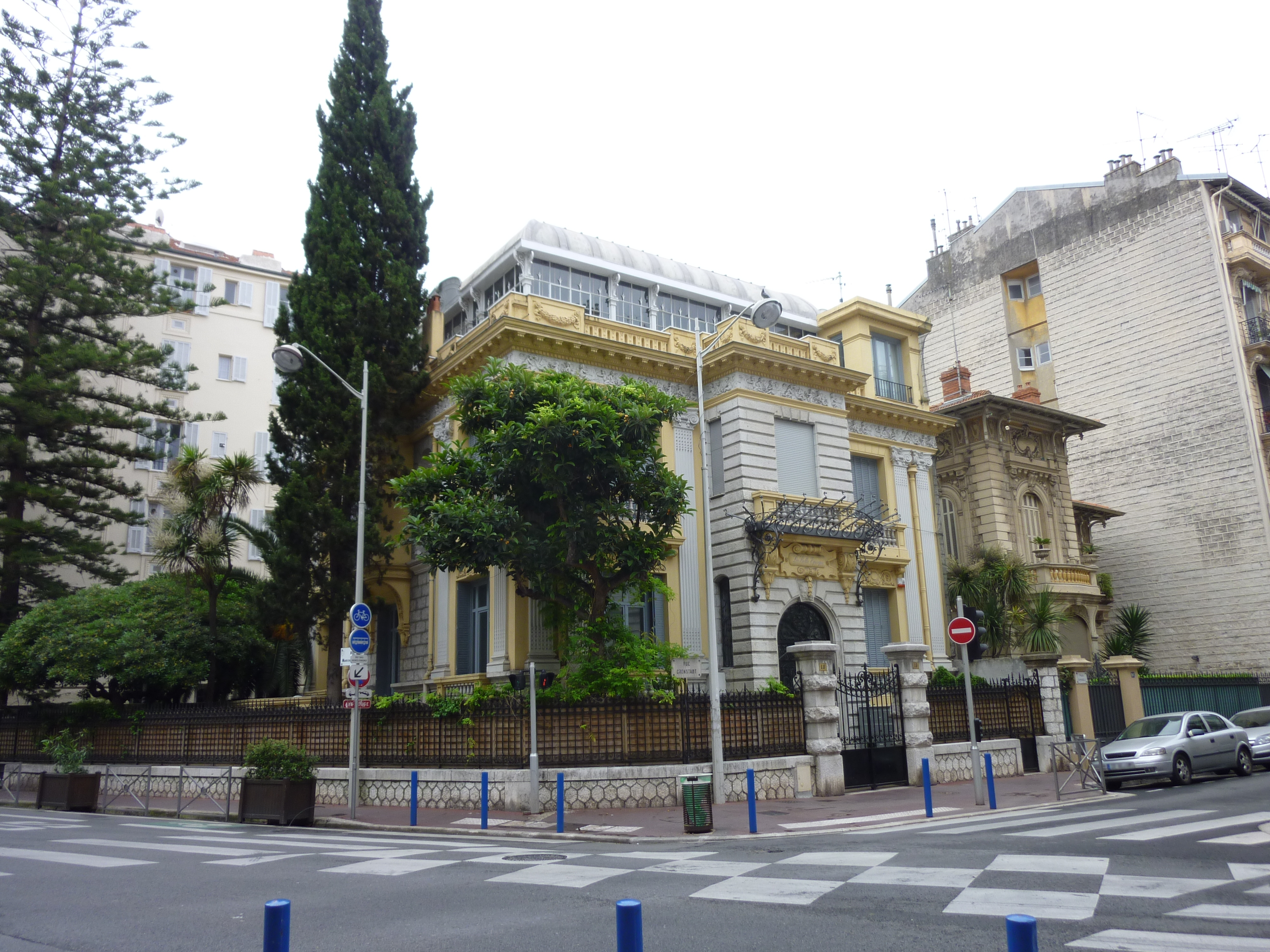
Villa La Belle Époque.

Villa La Belle Époque is a historic mansion in Nice, Alpes-Maritimes, France. It was built from 1909 to 1911 for Mr Enos. It was designed by architect Jean-Baptiste Blanchi, with additional gilded decorations designed by Michel de Tarnowski. It has been listed as an official national monument since October 23, 1992.
