= Collingwood Collegiate Institute =

Location
- 6 Cameron Street; Collingwood, Ontario, L9Y 2J2; Canada; 44.4872°N 80.2157°W

Information
- Funding type: Public
- Founded: 1858
- School board: Simcoe County District School Board
- Superintendent: Kelly Lalonde
- Area trustee: Julie Rose
- School number: 902551
- Principal: Daniel Macdonald
- Grades: 9-12
- Enrollment: 1500 (2025)
- Colors: Black & Gold
- Team name: Collingwood Collegiate Fighting Owls
- Website: cci.scdsb.on.ca

Collingwood Collegiate Institute (known as CCI) is a public secondary school (grades 9–12) located in Collingwood, Ontario, Canada. It currently has an enrollment of about 1,500 students and employs over 90 teachers and staff. CCI currently has the largest student population within the county. The principal is Daniel Macdonald. The school is administered by the Simcoe County District School Board (SCDSB).

The school offers a wide range of courses and activities such as English arts, math, physical education & technology. CCI also has a fair selection of sport teams such as football, rugby & hockey. Students that attend CCI come from Collingwood, Wasaga Beach, Blue Mountain and Clearview Township (Nottawa, Duntroon, Singhampton).

The superintendent of Area F, which includes the school, is Kelly Lalonde.

== Feeder schools ==
The school’s feeder schools are mostly in Collingwood but a few are in nearby Clearview, Ontario and Wasaga Beach.

=== In Collingwood ===
- Admiral Collingwood Elementary School - opened in 1981 on the original site of Collingwood CI (demolished in 2005 and now Monaco condominiums) and relocated in 2003.
- Birchview Dunes Elementary School opened in 2008
- Cameron Street Public School opened in 1967
- Connaught Public School opened in 1903 as East Ward on Napier Street before remaining in 1911, and moved in 1961 on Peel Street with old site now as Duke Lofts.
- Mountain View Public School opened in the 1971

=== Clearview ===
- Nottawa Elementary School opened in 1998

=== Wasaga Beach ===
- Wasaga Beach Public School opened in 2024
- Worseley Elementary School opened in 1956 as Oxbow Park and renamed in 1994.

== Notable people ==
- Ruth Elizabeth Spence (1890-1982) - Collingwood Collegiate Institute teacher, 1914-15

== See also ==
- Education in Ontario
- List of secondary schools in Ontario
