= Ruth Elizabeth Spence =

Ruth Elizabeth Spence (née, Spence; after marriage, Arndt; 1890–1982) was a Canadian teacher and historian of Prohibition. She was the co-founder of South Africa's nursery school movement, and served as President of the South African Nursery School Association.

== Early life and education ==
Ruth Elizabeth Spence was born in Toronto, Canada, on June 2, 1890. Spence came from a family of temperance workers. Her father was Francis Stephens Spence, who was one of the pioneer leaders in the Prohibition movement in Canada. Her mother was Sarah Violet (née Norris).

She was educated at Jarvis Collegiate Institute, Harbord Collegiate Institute, Toronto, and the University of Toronto (B.A., 1913). She received her Ph.D. (1924) from Columbia University where she studied under John Dewey. The title of her Ph.D. dissertation was, Education as Growth: Its Significance for the Secondary Schools of Ontario.

== Career ==
She was a teacher in the Collingwood Collegiate Institute, Collingwood, Ontario (1914–15); at Jarvis Collegiate Institute, Toronto (1915–19), and served as secretary of the Student Christian Movement of Canada, University of Toronto (1919–21).

She was the author of Prohibition in Canada: A Memorial to Francis Stephens Spence, a comprehensive history of the Prohibition moveement in the Dominion, wvritten as a memorial to her father, and published by the Dominion Alliance (Toronto, 1919). She was a delegate of the Alliance to the Fifteenth International Congress Against Alcoholism, held at Washington, D.C., in 1920, and she addressed that body on "The Movement Against Alcoholism in the Dominion of Canada".

In 1975, she received an honorary degree from the University of South Africa.

== Personal life ==
While she was a student at Columbia University, she met fellow student Ernst Arndt, future economist and Deputy Governor of the South African Reserve Bank. His father was Rev. J. Arndt of Bloemfontein, South Africa. They married on August 6, 1926, in South Africa.

The couple had a son David and a daughter Wenonah.

== Death and legacy ==
Ruby Elizabeth Spence Arndt died in Pretoria, South Africa, on September 8, 1982.

The Ruth Arndt Early Learning Centre in Pretoria is named in her honour.

== Selected works ==
- Education as Growth, 1925 (text, via Hathitrust)
- John Dewey's Philosophy of Education, 1929 (text)
- Prohibition in Canada: A Memorial to Francis Stephens Spence, 1919 (text, via Internet Archive)
