= Prohibition in Canada: A Memorial to Francis Stephens Spence =

- Author: Ruth Elizabeth Spence
- Language: English
- Subject: prohibition in Canada
- Genre: history
- Publisher: Ontario Branch of the Dominion Alliance
- Publication date: 1919
- Publication place: Toronto, Canada
- Media type: print
- Pages: 624
- ISBN: 9780428979638

Prohibition in Canada: A Memorial to Francis Stephens Spence is an academic, non-fiction book by Ruth Elizabeth Spence, which documented the history of prohibition in Canada. It was published by the Ontario Branch of the Dominion Alliance, in Toronto, in 1919, two years after the death of her father Francis Stephens Spence, whom she quoted liberally. The 624 page book includes appendices and an index.

== Background ==
The 624 page book was written by Ruth E. Spence, with a Foreword by John Redpath Dougall, and liberal quotes by F. S. Spence. Section XIII was compiled by Myrtle Flumerfelt.

== Overview ==
This history of the struggle against the evils of liquors and against the liquor traffic carries the reader back to the earliest days of settlement, the difficulties at once experienced as early as 1629 due to the exchange of fire-water for furs. Brandy became "the chief source of profit in the English, French and Indian fur trade in spite of the express prohibition of the governors and the strong opposition of the church." Bishop François de Laval and the Jesuit missionaries from the beginning undertook to prevent the natives from intoxication, but for time being unsuccessfully. Later, the indigenous people were the first people of Canada to receive legal protection against the liquor traffic.

Undertaken as a memorial to Francis Spence who, for many years before his death in 1917, was perhaps the most influential leader in the Canadian temperance movement, the volume traces the history not only of the movement, but that of the various organizations which had part in it. As in the United States, Canada's temperance reform in the nineteenth century began with the question of personal use, first abstinence from spirituous liquors, later entire abstinence from all alcoholic beverages. "Not only historically but logically," Mr. Spence is quoted as saying, "the temperance movement in its personal aspect lies behind the prohibition propaganda."

The influence of the Maine law movement in the middle of the century made itself felt in the Maritime Provinces and in Canada but secured no permanent foothold. The demand for prohibition, however, never ceased and through all the intervening years has lain behind Canadian legislation which, for fifty years, was along local option lines. Never losing sight of the ultimate goal of complete prohibition, the temperance organizations worked local option for all there was in it. Meanwhile temperance instruction was introduced into the public schools, a general public sentiment favorable to sobriety steadily increased. The Dominion Alliance for the Total Suppression of the Liquor Traffic, which became the center of the forces working for legislation against the traffic grew out of a convention called by sixteen members of the House of Commons, and declared from the beginning its intention to use its efforts in such ways as will "best promote the suppression, the sale and use of intoxicating liquors throughout the Dominion."

The story of the struggle of the various provinces toward prohibition is interestingly told. Prince Edward Island came under complete provincial prohibition in 1902, Nova Scotia in 1916, New Brunswick in 1917; Ontario came under prohibition in 1916, confirming it by a heavy vote, October, 1919, taken after the soldiers' return; Manitoba adopted prohibition by popular vote in 1916; Saskatchewan went under prohibition in 1917; Alberta in 1916; British Columbia in 1917; Yukon Territory by Order in Council, 1918. During the World War I, Dominion orders-in-council (1917-18) practically stopped the manufacture of intoxicating liquor for beverage purposes, transportation or delivery of such liquors into provinces prohibiting their sale; importation of intoxicating liquors into Canada. These provisions were made effective during the war and for twelve months after the conclusion of peace.

The volume preserved the history of the movement in Canada. About seventy-five pages were devoted to brief summaries of the status of the prohibition question throughout the world.

== Chapters ==
- I. The Movement and the Man
- II. Early History
- III. Organizations
- IV. Maine Law Period
- V. Scott Act Period
- VI. Political Action
- VII. royal Commission of 1892
- VIII. Provincial Plebiscite Period
- IX. Dominion Plebiscite
- X. Provincial Action
- XI. Provincial Prohibition
- XII. Dominion Prohibition
- XIII. World Progress
