= Marie Bashkirtseff =

Artist (1858–1884)

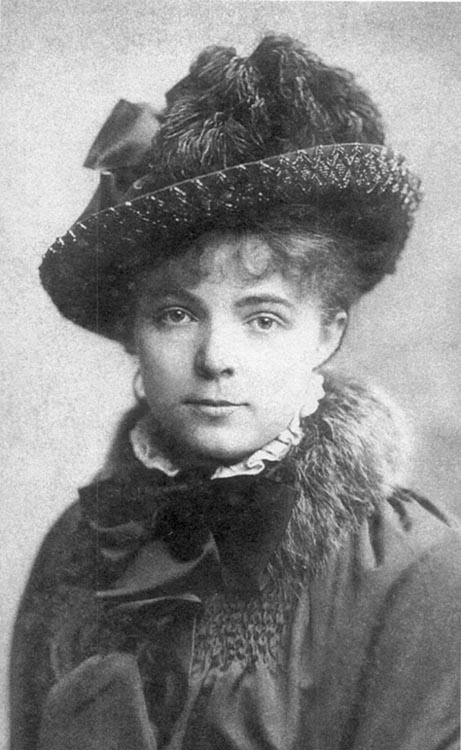
- Bashkirtseff, 1878
- Born: Maria Konstantinovna Bashkirtseva; 12 November 1858; Gavrontsi, Poltava Governorate, Russian Empire (now Ukraine)
- Died: 31 October 1884 (aged 25); Paris, France
- Resting place: Cimetière de Passy, Paris, France
- Occupations: Diarist, painter, sculptor
- Known for: Journals and paintings
- Notable work: The Journal of Marie Bashkirtseff

Signature
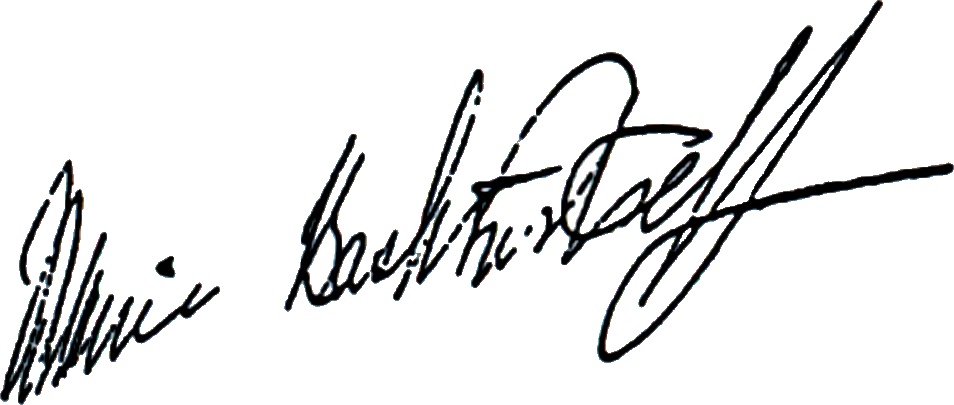

Marie Bashkirtseff, born Maria Konstantinovna Bashkirtseva (Russian: Мария Константиновна Башкирцева; 24 November [O.S. 12 November] 1858 – 31 October 1884), was an émigré artist who was born into a noble family on their estate near the city of Poltava. She lived and worked in Paris, and died at the age of 25.

== Life and painting career ==
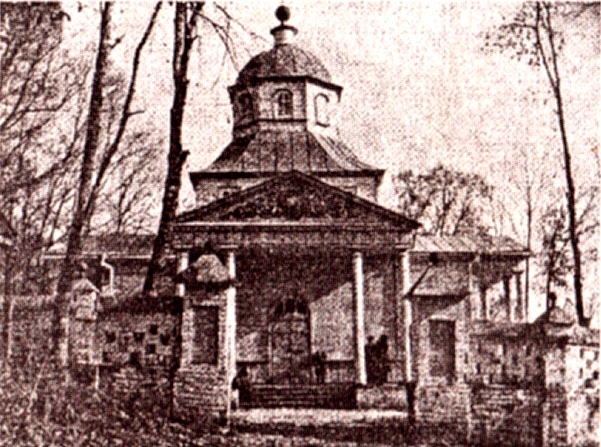
Church of the Nativity of St. John the Baptist, where Maria was christened

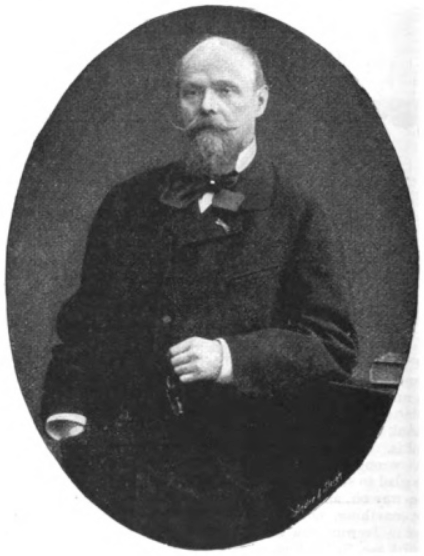
Mary's father, Konstantin Pavlovich

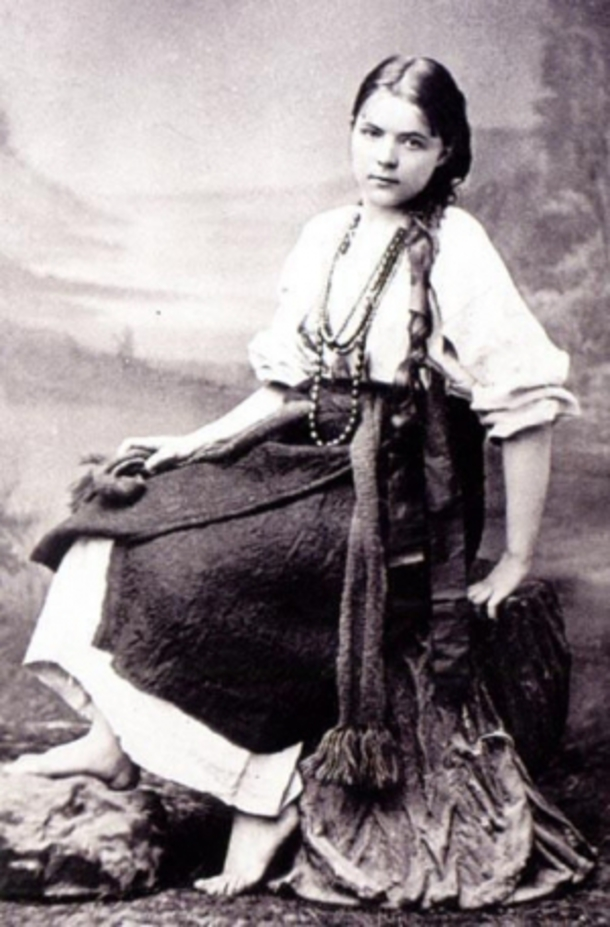
Maria Bashkirtseva in a folk costume

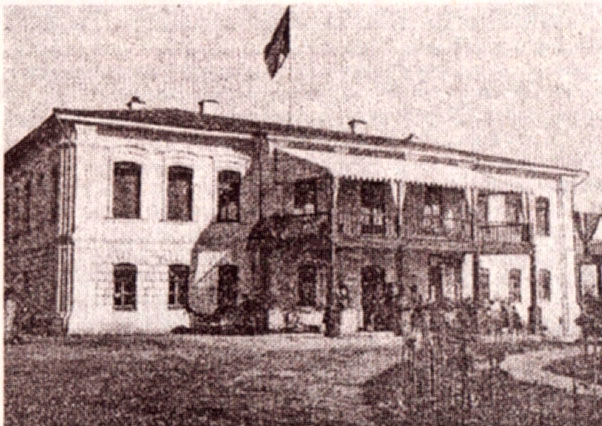
The house of Bashkirtseffs in Gavrontsi

Bashkirtseff was born in Gavrontsi (Havrontsi) near Poltava, Russian Empire (present-day Ukraine), to a wealthy noble family. Her father was a local marshal of nobility, Konstantin Pavlovich Bashkirtsev. Her mother Maria Stepanovna Babanina (1833—1920) also belonged to Russian nobles. Her parents separated when she was 12. As a result, she grew up mostly abroad, traveling with her mother throughout most of Europe, with longer spells in Germany and on the Riviera, until the family settled in Paris. Educated privately and with early musical talent, she lost her chance at a career as a singer when illness destroyed her voice. She then determined to become an artist, and she studied painting in France at the Robert-Fleury studio and at the Académie Julian.

The Académie, as one of the few establishments that accepted female students, attracted young women from all over Europe and the United States. Fellow students at the Académie included Anna Bilińska and especially Louise Breslau, whom Bashkirtseff viewed as her only real rival. Bashkirtseff would go on to produce a remarkable, if fairly conventional, body of work in her short lifetime, exhibiting at the Paris Salon as early as 1880 and every year thereafter until her death (except 1883). In 1884, she exhibited a portrait of Paris slum children entitled The Meeting and a pastel portrait of her cousin, for which she received an honorable mention.

Bashkirtseff's best-known works are The Meeting (now in the Musée d'Orsay, Paris) and her 1881 In the Studio, a portrait of her fellow artists at work. Although a large number of Bashkirtseff's works were destroyed by the Nazis during World War II, at least 60 survive. In 2000, a U.S. touring exhibition entitled "Overcoming All the Obstacles: The Women of Academy Julian" featured works by Bashkirtseff and her schoolmates.

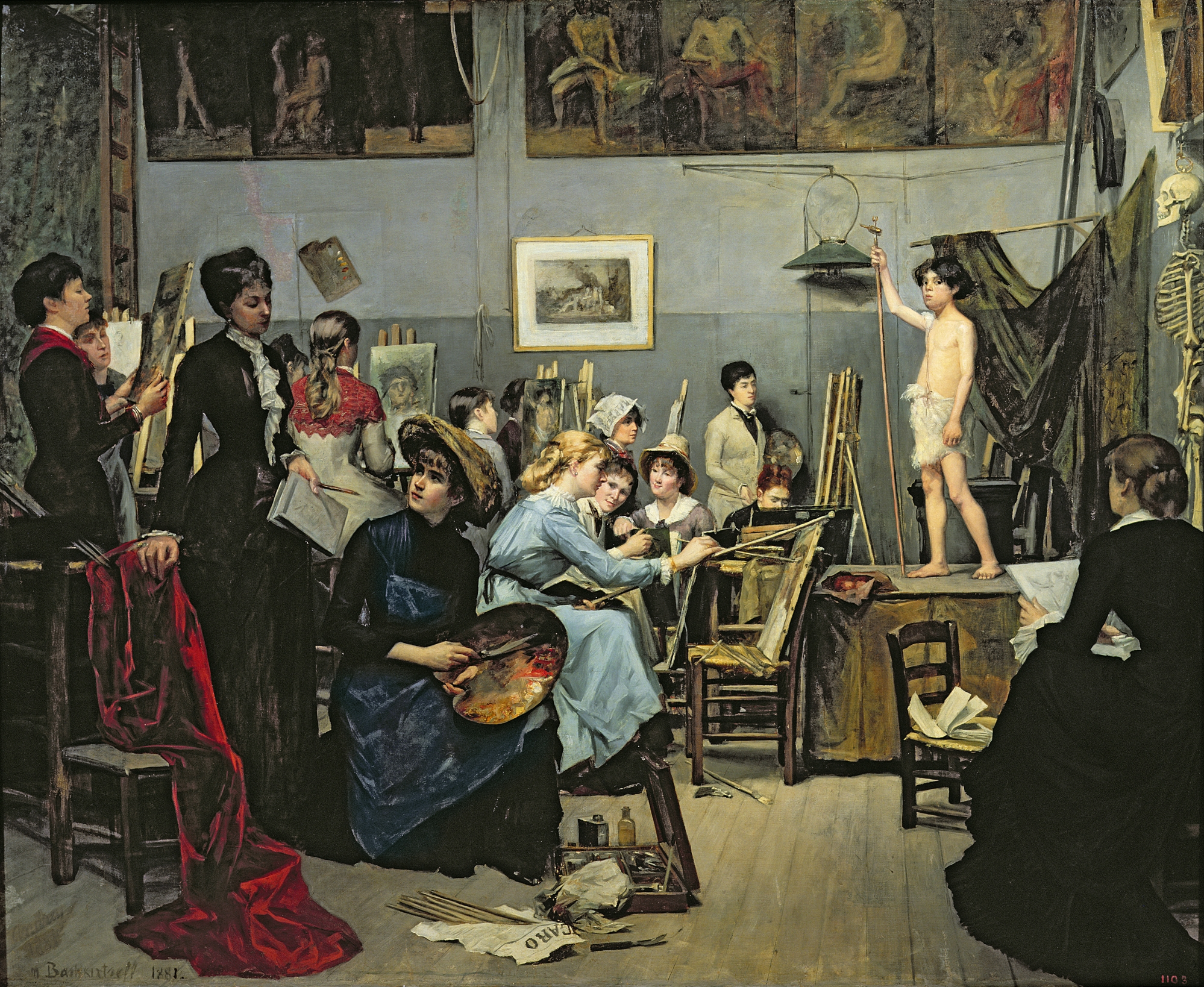
In the Studio by Marie Bashkirtseff (1881), who portrays herself as the central figure seated in the foreground

As a painter, Bashkirtseff took her cue from her friend Jules Bastien-Lepage's admiration for realism and naturalism. Where Bastien-Lepage had found his inspiration in nature, Bashkirtseff turned to the urban scene, writing, "I say nothing of the fields because Bastien-Lepage reigns over them as a sovereign; but the streets, however, have not yet had their... Bastien." By unlucky chance, both artists succumbed prematurely to chronic illness in the same year, and the later pages of Bashkirtseff's journal record her visits to the dying painter.

Dying of tuberculosis at the age of 25, Bashkirtseff lived just long enough to emerge as an intellectual in Paris in the 1880s. She wrote several articles for Hubertine Auclert's feminist newspaper La Citoyenne in 1881 under the nom de plume "Pauline Orrel." One of her most-quoted sayings is "Let us love dogs, let us love only dogs! Men and cats are unworthy creatures."

Bashkirtseff died in Paris in 1884, and she is buried in Cimetière de Passy, Paris. Her great friend Prince Bojidar Karageorgevitch was present at her deathbed. Her monument is a full-sized artist's studio that has been declared a historic monument by the government of France. Marie Bashkirtseff was included in the 2018 exhibition Women in Paris 1850-1900.

== Diary ==
From approximately the age of 13, Bashkirtseff kept a journal, and it is probably for this that she is most famous today. It has been called "a strikingly modern psychological self-portrait of a young, gifted mind", and her urgent prose, which occasionally breaks out into dialogue, remains extremely readable. She was multilingual and despite her self-involvement, was a keen observer with an acute ear for hypocrisy, so that her journal also offers a near-novelistic account of the late nineteenth century European bourgeoisie. A consistent theme throughout her journal is her deep desire to achieve fame, inflected by her increasing fear that her intermittent illnesses might turn out to be tuberculosis. In a prefatory section written toward the end of her life, in which she recounts her family history, she writes, "If I do not die young I hope to live as great artist; but if I die young, I intend to have my journal, which cannot fail to be interesting, published." Similarly: "When I am dead, my life, which appears to me a remarkable one, will be read. (The only thing wanting is that it should have been different)." In effect, the first half of Bashkirtseff's journal is a coming-of-age story while the second is an account of heroic suffering.

Bashkirtseff's journal was first published in 1887, and was only the second diary by a woman published in France to that date. It was an immediate success, not least because its cosmopolitan confessional style was a marked departure from the contemplative, mystical diaries of the writer Eugénie de Guérin that had been published in 1862. An English translation appeared two years later under the title Marie Bashkirtseff: The Journal of a Young Artist 1860–1884. Translated by Mary J. Serrano, it was heavily abridged and bowdlerized, her relatives seeing to it that a good deal of material they considered unflattering to the family was removed.

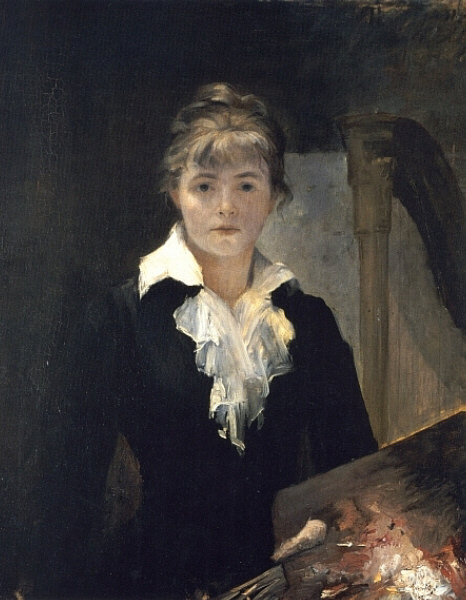
Self-portrait with a Palette, 1880

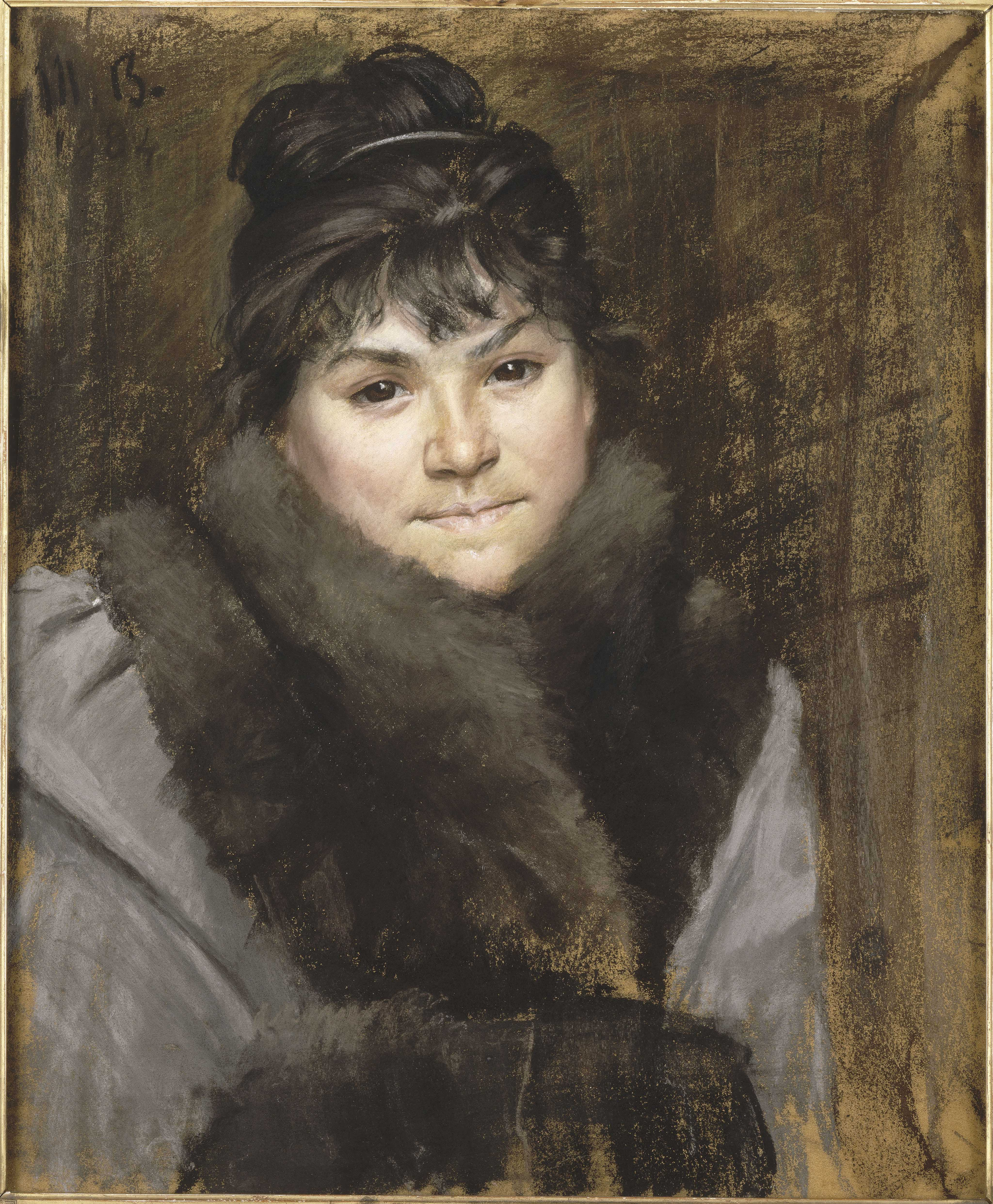
Marie Bashkirtseff - portrait of Mme X

British Prime Minister William Gladstone referred to her journal as "a book without a parallel", and another early admirer was George Bernard Shaw. The late nineteenth century English novelist George Gissing read the original French version over eight days in June 1890. It remained popular, eventually spinning off both plays and movies based on her life story, including The Affairs of Maupassant, directed by Henry Koster and released in the United States in 1938. Her diary was cited as an inspiration by the American writer Mary MacLane, whose own shockingly confessional diary was written a bare generation later, and it was mentioned as a model by later writers who became known for their diaries, including Pierre Louÿs, Katherine Mansfield, W.N.P. Barbellion, and Anaïs Nin.

Her letters, consisting of her correspondence with the writer Guy de Maupassant (which she had begun under an assumed name) were first published in 1891.

Until recently the accepted date of Bashkirtseff's birth was 11 November [23 November New Style], 1860. After the discovery of the original manuscript of Bashkirtseff's journal in the Bibliothèque nationale de France, however, it was found that her journal had been abridged and censored by her family in its first editions. Her date of birth (1858 not 1860) was falsified by her mother to make Bashkirtseff appear even more precocious. An unabridged edition of the complete journal, based on the original manuscript, has been published in French in 16 volumes, and excerpts from the years 1873–1876 have been translated into English under the title I Am the Most Interesting Book of All (see editions listed below).

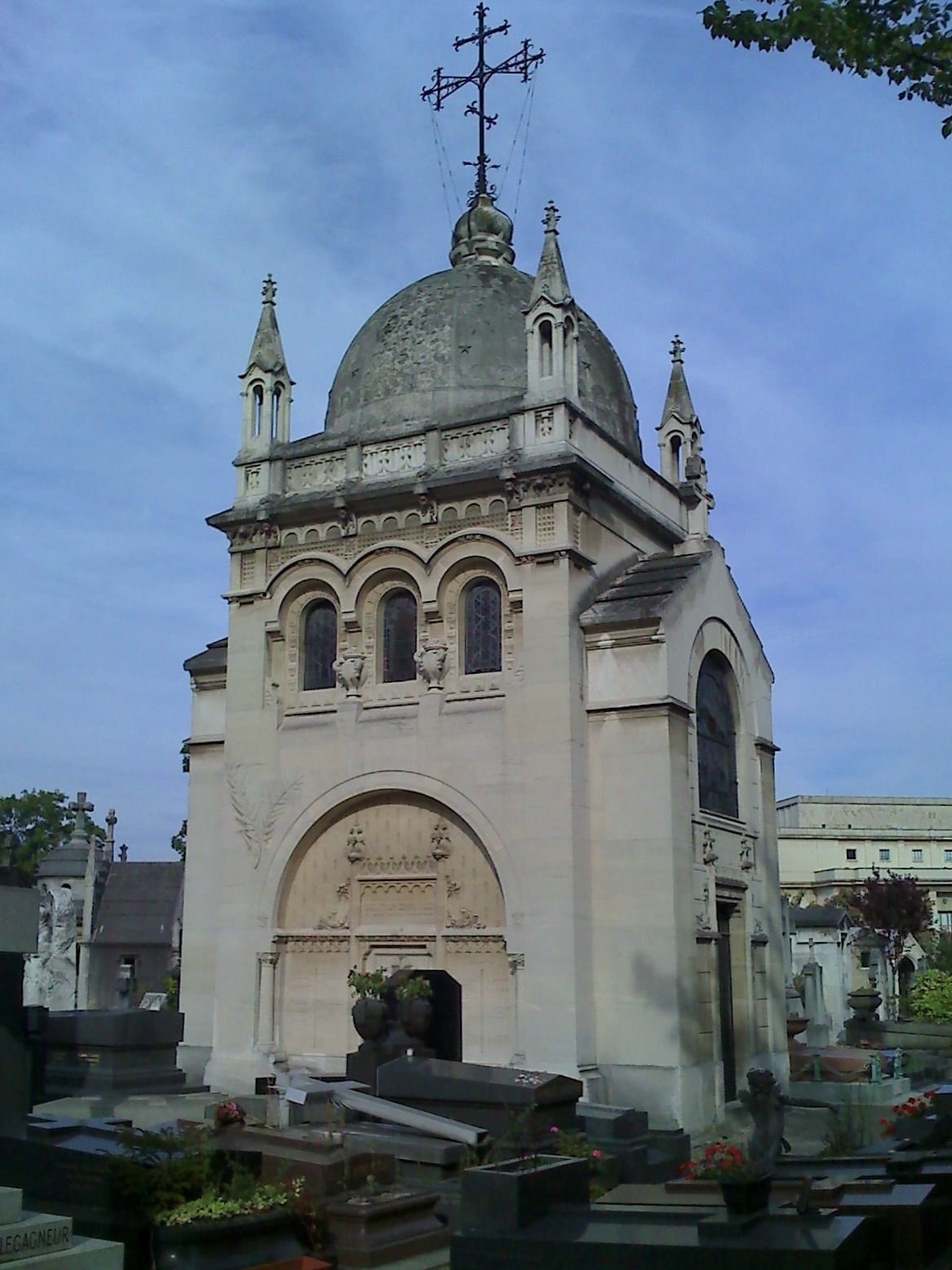
Marie Bashkirtseff's grave, Passy Cemetery, Paris

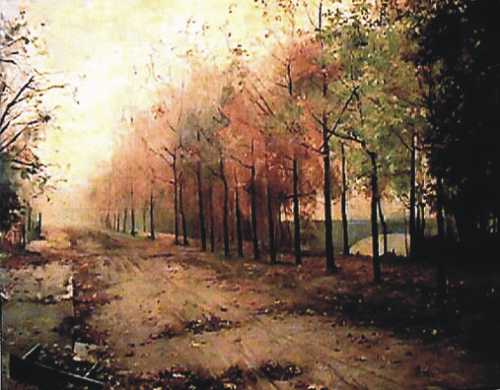
Autumn, 1883

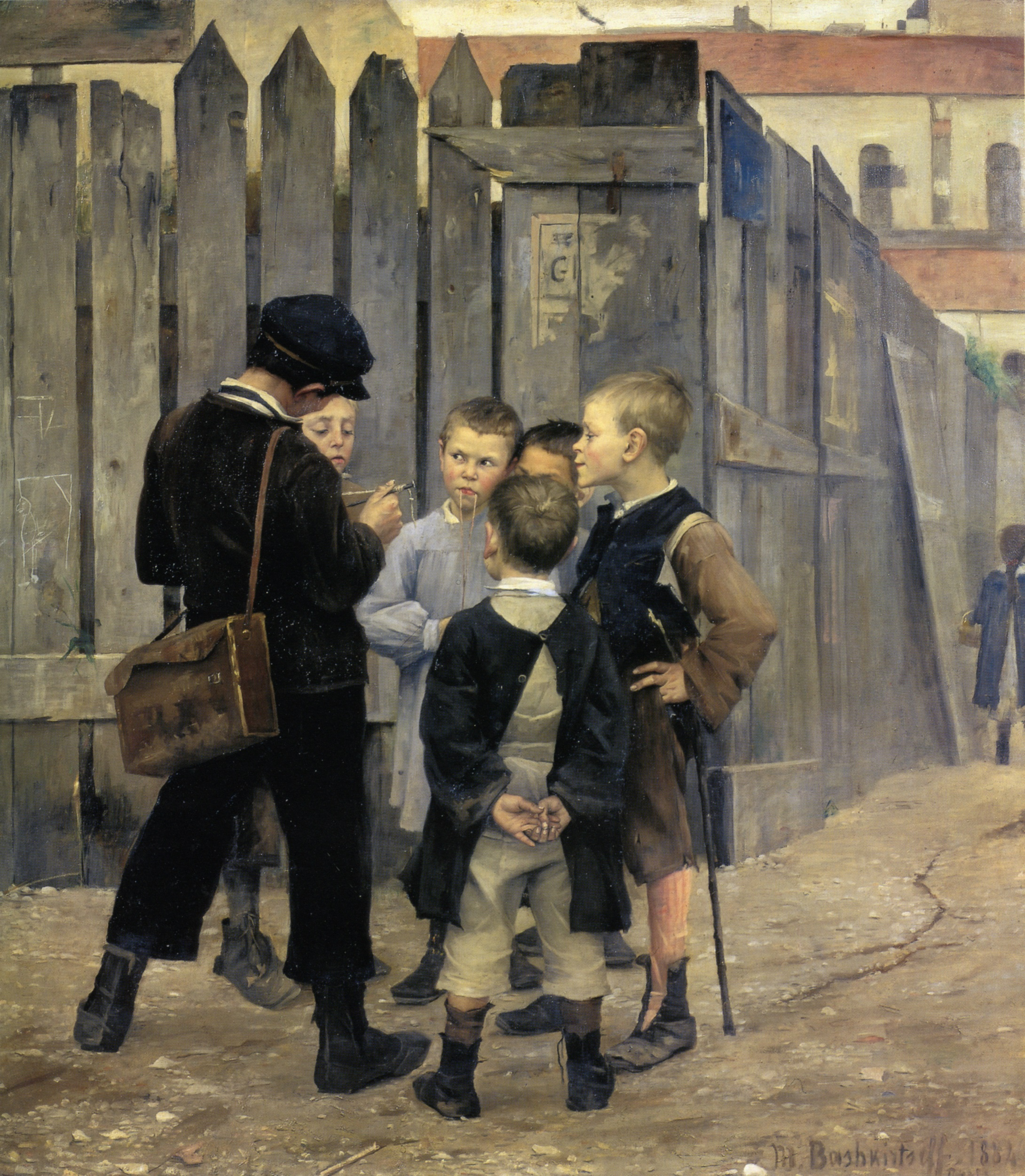
The Meeting, 1884

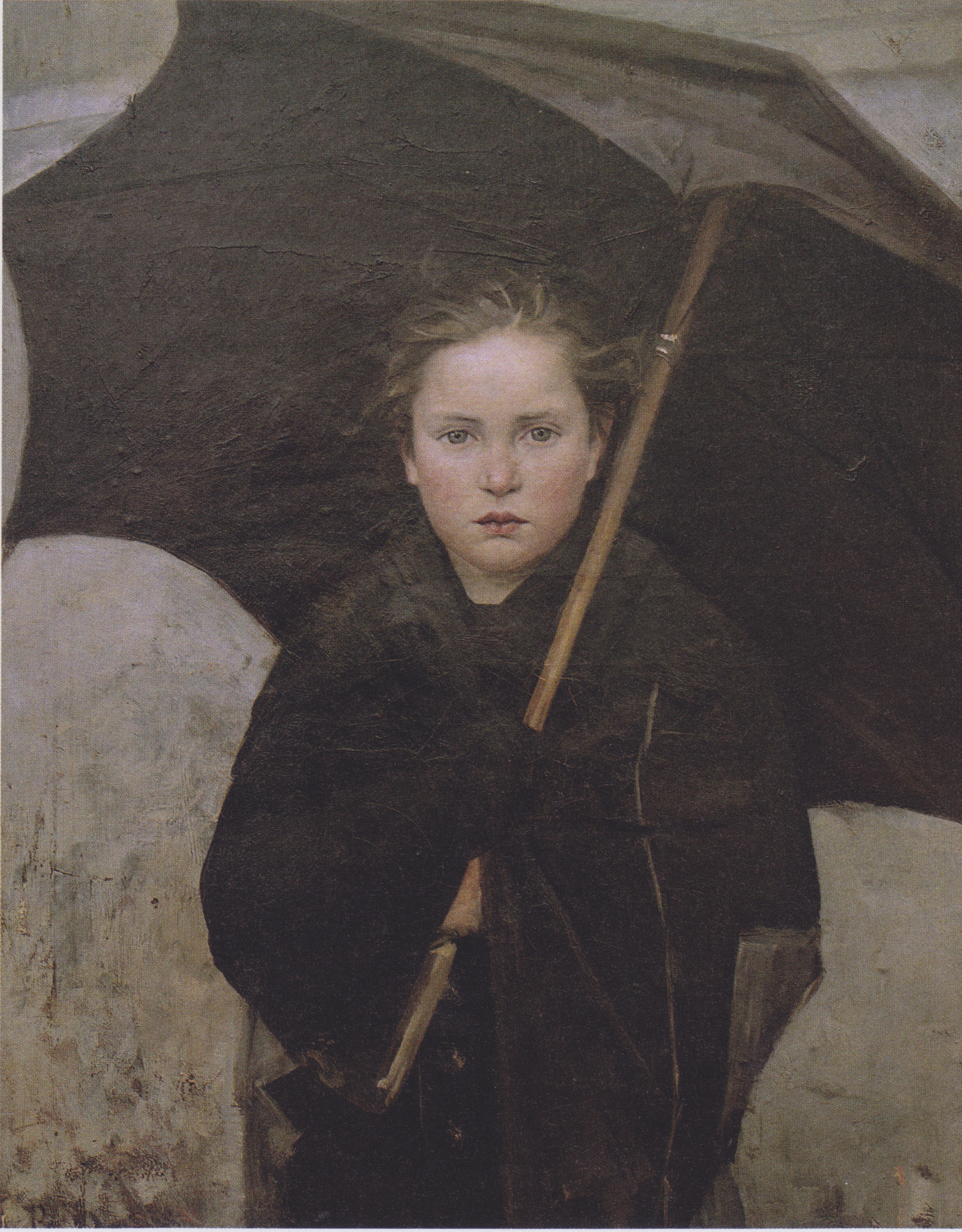
The Umbrella, 1883

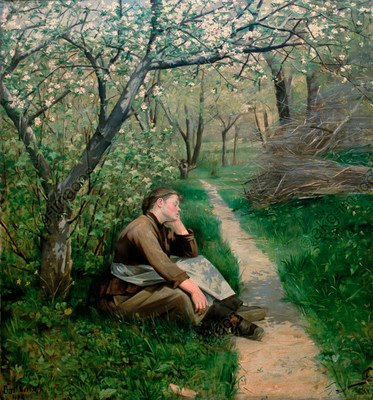
Spring, c. 1884

=== Editions ===
- The Journal of Marie Bashkirtseff: I Am the Most Interesting Book of All (Volume I) and Lust for Glory (Volume II). English Translation by Katherine Kernberger. E-book version: ISBN 978-1-62652-076-9, Publisher: Fonthill Press, 2013.
- Mon journal. Texte intégral. Volumes I-XVI (complete text of the journal, transcribed by Ginette Apostolescu). Paris: Montesson (5 rue Jean-Claude-Bézanier, 78360 ). Cercle des amis de Marie Bashkirtseff, 2005. ISBN 2-9518398-5-5. (in French)
- I Am the Most Interesting Book of All: The Diary of Marie Bashkirtseff Vol 1. English translation by Phyllis Howard Kernberger and Katherine Kernberger. ISBN 0-8118-0224-8, ISBN 978-0-8118-0224-6, Publisher: Chronicle Books, 1997.
- Journal of Marie Bashkirtseff. Translated by A.D. Hall and G.B. Heckel. New York: Rand, McNally, 1890. (Title page state: "The only complete English edition").
- The Journal of Marie Bashkirtseff. Translated, with an introduction, by Mathilde Blind. 2 volumes. London, 1890.
- Marie Bashkirtseff: The Journal of a Young Artist 1860–1884. English translation by Mary J. Serrano. New York: Cassell, 1889.
- Journal de Marie Bashkirtseff, avec un portrait. 2 volumes, 1887. (in French)
