= The Journal of a Disappointed Man =

Journal entries by Bruce Cummings

- Title page for The Journal of a Disappointed Man (1919)
- Author: W.N.P. Barbellion
- Language: English
- Genre: Diary
- Publication date: March 1919

The Journal of a Disappointed Man is the first volume of published journal entries by English naturalist and diarist Bruce Frederick Cummings, writing under the pen name W. N. P. Barbellion.

== Production ==
The Journal of a Disappointed Man was described by its author as "a study in the nude". The book was originally optioned by Collins, who eventually rejected the book because they feared the "lack of morals" shown by Barbellion would damage their reputation. An editor's note at the very end of the book claims Barbellion died on 31 December 1917, but Cummings in fact lived for nearly two more years.

The first edition bore a preface by H.G. Wells, which led some reviewers to believe the journal was a work of fiction by Wells himself; Wells publicly denied this but the true identity of "Barbellion" was not known by the public until after Cummings' death.

== Reception ==
After its publication, The Journal of a Disappointed Man became the best known personal account of multiple sclerosis. It was variously regarded "with undisguised contempt, damned as immoral, or acclaimed a work of genius, hailed as a masterpiece." The strong early sales and the admiration received by the book are largely forgotten by the wider reading public today, but the book has been frequently reprinted in paperback and is regarded as a minor classic of English literature. It has been likened to the best work of other writers like Franz Kafka and James Joyce.
