= Juan Eduardo Zúñiga =

Spanish writer and literary critic (1919–2020)

- Born: 24 January 1919
- Died: 24 February 2020 (aged 101)

Juan Eduardo Zúñiga Amaro (24 January 1919 – 24 February 2020) was a Spanish writer, Slavonic scholar, Portuguese scholar, literary critic and translator.

== Works ==
=== Narrative ===
- Inútiles totales [Totally useless] (1951), novel
- El coral y las aguas [The coral and the waters] (1962), novel
- El último día del mundo [The last day of the world] (1992), novel
- Misterios de las noches y los días [Mysteries of the nights and days] (1992), short stories
- Flores de plomo [Lead flowers] (1999), historical novel
- La trilogía de la Guerra Civil [The Spanish Civil War trilogy] (1980–2003), short stories, published together without a title at Cátedra publishers in 2007, and with the reviewed title and two additional stories at Galaxia Gutenberg in 2011 (summing up a total of 35 stories).
  - Largo noviembre de Madrid [Long November in Madrid] (1980), short stories
  - La tierra será un paraíso [The earth will be a paradise] (1989), short stories
  - Capital de la gloria [Glory capital] (2003), short stories
- Brillan monedas oxidadas [Rusty coins shine] (2010), short stories

=== Essays ===
- Hungría y Rumania en el Danubio; las luchas históricas en Transilvania y Besarabia [Hungary and Romania on the Danube; the historic fights in Transylvania and Bessarabia], Madrid, Editorial Pace [1944?].
- La historia y la política de Bulgaria [The history and politics of Bulgaria], Madrid: Pace, 1945.
- Los artículos sociales de Mariano José de Larra [The social articles of Mariano José de Larra], Madrid: Taurus, 1963 (anthology).
- El anillo de Pushkin. Lectura romántica de escritores y paisajes rusos [Pushkin's ring: romantic reading of Russian writers and landscapes], Barcelona: Bruguera, 1983; re-edited in Madrid: Alfaguara, 1992.
- Sofía [Sofia], 1990, travel writings.
- Las inciertas pasiones de Iván Turgueniev [The uncertain passions of Ivan Turgenev], 1999 (published before with the title Los imposibles afectos de Iván Turgueniev: ensayo biográfico [The impossible effects of Ivan Turgenev: biographical essays], Madrid: Editora Nacional, 1977).
- Desde los bosques nevados: memoria de escritores rusos [From the snowy woods: memory of Russian writers], 2010.
- "Foreword" to Anton Pavlovich Chekhov, Cuentos completos [Complete stories], Madrid: Aguilar, 1962.
