= Havrontsi =

Rural locality in Poltava Oblast, Ukraine

Havrontsi Гавронці
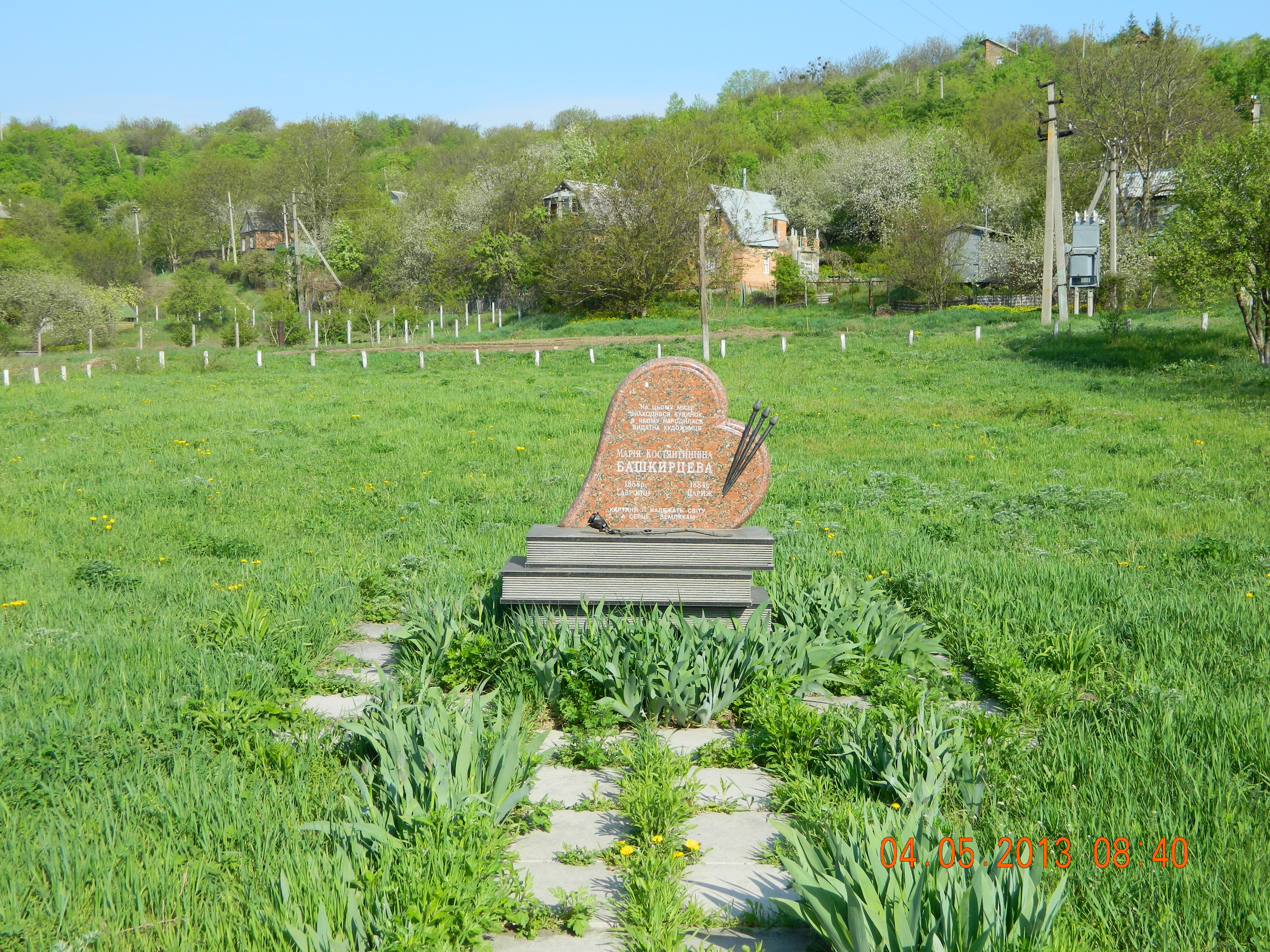
- Memorial sign on the place of Marie Bashkirtseff manor in Havrontsi

- Location in Poltava Oblast
- Coordinates: 49°43′26″N 34°35′09″E
- Country: Ukraine
- Oblast: Poltava Oblast
- Raion: Poltava Raion
- Hromada: Dykanka settlement hromada
- Time zone: UTC+2 (EET)
  - Summer (DST): UTC+3 (EEST)
- Postal code: 38541

Havrontsi (Ukrainian: Гавронці) is a village in the Dykanka settlement hromada of the Poltava Raion of Poltava Oblast in Ukraine.

== History ==
In 1690, a comrade of the Poltava regiment, Leontii Haivoronskyi, received a royal charter for the village of Havrontsi.

On 19 July 2020, as a result of the administrative-territorial reform and liquidation of the Dykanka Raion, the village became part of the Poltava Raion.

== Notable residents ==
- Marie Bashkirtseff (Mariia Bashkyrtseva; 1858–1884), French painter and writer of Ukrainian origin
