= W. N. P. Barbellion =

English diarist (1889–1919)

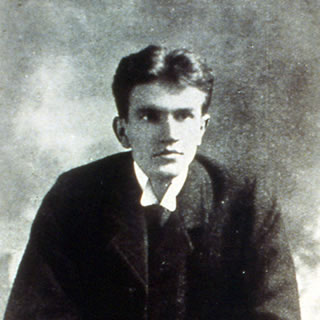
- Born: Bruce Frederick Cummings; 7 September 1889; Barnstaple, Devon, England
- Died: 22 October 1919 (aged 30); Camden Cottage, Gerrards Cross, Buckinghamshire, England
- Occupation: Diarist
- Spouse: Winifred Eleanor Benger
- Children: 1
- Parent(s): John Cummings; Maria Cummings
- Writing career
- Pen name: Wilhelm Nero Pilate Barbellion
- Notable work: The Journal of a Disappointed Man (1919)

Wilhelm Nero Pilate Barbellion was the pen name of Bruce Frederick Cummings (7 September 1889 – 22 October 1919), an English diarist who was responsible for The Journal of a Disappointed Man. Ronald Blythe called it "among the most moving diaries ever created".

== Early life and education ==
Cummings was born in Barnstaple 16 Cross Street on 7 September 1889, the youngest child of John and Maria Cummings. He was a naturalist at heart and ended up working at the British Museum's Department of Natural History in London. Having begun his journal at the age of thirteen, Cummings continued to record his observations there – gradually moving from dry scientific notes to a more personal, literary style. Despite an obvious passion for the subject from an early age, Cummings, upon the advice of others, followed his father and Brother (Arthur John) into the world of journalism, which he hated, as he often mentioned in his diary. His literary ambitions changed course in 1914 upon reading the journal of the Russian painter Marie Bashkirtseff, in whom he recognised a kindred spirit. In his 15 January 1915 entry he indicated that he intended his Journal to be published: "Then all in God’s good time I intend getting a volume ready for publication."

== Army rejection ==
Cummings' life changed forever when he was called to enlist in the British Army to fight in World War I in November 1915. He had consulted his doctor before taking the regulation medical prior to enlisting, and his doctor had given him a sealed, confidential letter to present to the medical officer at the recruitment center. Cummings did not know what was contained in the letter, but in the event it was not needed; the medical officer rejected Cummings as unfit for active duty after the most cursory of medical examinations. Hurt, Cummings decided to open the letter on his way back home to see what had been inside, and was staggered to learn that his doctor had diagnosed him with multiple sclerosis, and that he almost certainly had less than five years to live.

The news changed Cummings profoundly, and his journal became much more intense and personal as a result. He had married Winifred Eleanor Benger (aka Eleanor Abbey after her second marriage to Edwin Abbey) shortly before discovering his illness in 1915, and had a daughter, Penelope, in October 1916, but was later moved to discover that his wife had been informed of his condition long before he himself knew his fate, and his efforts to spare the feelings of his family had been in vain since they had known his condition even before he had.

== Publication of the diaries and final years ==
His diaries up to the winter of 1917, which he revised and corrected prior to publication, were eventually published in March 1919 under the title The Journal of a Disappointed Man. He chose the pseudonym "W. N. P. Barbellion" to protect the identities of his family and friends; he chose the forenames "Wilhelm", "Nero" and "Pilate" as his examples of the most wretched men ever to have lived. The first edition bore a preface by H. G. Wells, which led some reviewers to believe the journal was a work of fiction by Wells himself; Wells publicly denied this but the true identity of "Barbellion" was not known by the public until after Cummings' death.

The Journal of a Disappointed Man, filled with frank and keen observation, unique philosophy and personal resignation, was described by its author as "a study in the nude". The book received both adulatory and scathing reviews; Collins, having originally optioned the book, eventually rejected it because they feared the "lack of morals" shown by Barbellion would damage their reputation. An editor's note at the very end of the book claims Barbellion died on 31 December 1917, but Cummings in fact lived for nearly two more years. He died on 22 October 1919 at home in Camden Cottage, Gerrards Cross, Buckinghamshire, having recently approved the proofs of a second short volume of memoirs, Enjoying Life and Other Literary Remains; a third brief volume of his very last entries, A Last Diary, appeared in 1920. His identity was made public through his obituaries in various newspapers, at which point his brother Henry R. Cummings gave a newspaper interview providing details of the life of "Barbellion".

The strong early sales and the admiration received by The Journal of a Disappointed Man are largely forgotten by the wider reading public today, but the book has been frequently reprinted in paperback and is regarded as a classic of English literature. It has been likened to the best work of other writers, including Franz Kafka and James Joyce.

Barbellion sums up his life in one of the last entries in The Journal of a Disappointed Man: "I am only twenty-eight, but I have telescoped into those few years a tolerably long life: I have loved and married, and have a family; I have wept and enjoyed, struggled and overcome, and when the hour comes I shall be content to die."

Concerning death, Barbellion wrote:

To me the honour is sufficient of belonging to the universe – such a great universe, and so grand a scheme of things. Not even Death can rob me of that honour. For nothing can alter the fact that I have lived; I have been I, if for ever so short a time. And when I am dead, the matter which composes my body is indestructible—and eternal, so that come what may to my 'Soul,' my dust will always be going on, each separate atom of me playing its separate part – I shall still have some sort of a finger in the pie. When I am dead, you can boil me, burn me, drown me, scatter me – but you cannot destroy me: my little atoms would merely deride such heavy vengeance. Death can do no more than kill you.
