= George McLeod Winsor =

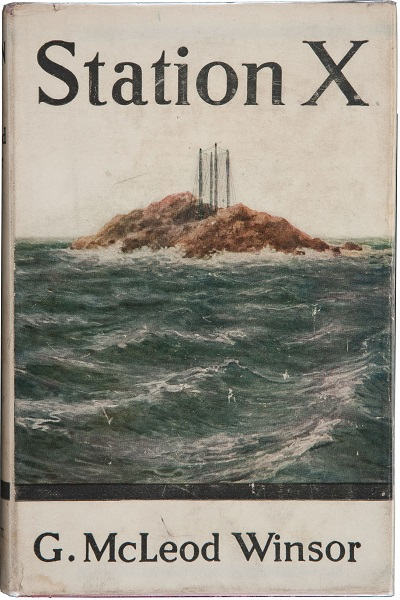
Station x - George McLeod Winsor

George McLeod Winsor (1856, Gateshead - 27 July 1939, Isleworth, Middlesex) was a British writer of fantastic fiction and mysteries. Published under the name 'G. McLeod Winsor'.

His novel Station X (1919) is a novel of the radio age and was noted by H.P. Lovecraft as a "semi-classic" in his 1934 essay “Some Notes on Interplanetary Fiction”. The novel narrates a psychic invasion of the Earth from Mars, told much in the manner of Jules Verne. It was later reprinted as a serial in Amazing magazine in 1926, to reader acclaim. Noted author van Vogt singled it out as a key work in the famous Arkham Sampler survey of 1948, but others on the panel did not share his opinion.

His The Mysterious Disappearances (1926), re-titled Vanishing Men in 1927, is a series of locked-room type mystery stories, including that of a mad scientist who develops a levitation device with which to kidnap his victims.

A final book was Once Bitten (1930), a lively murder mystery involving a military man who finds he has a doppelganger.
