= Dominion Alliance for the Total Suppression of the Liquor Traffic =

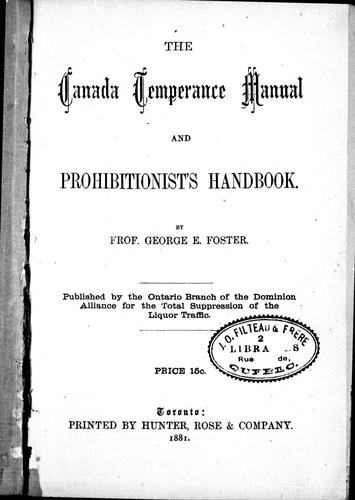
- The Canada Temperance Manual and Prohibitionist's Handbook (1881), published by the Dominion Alliance
- Abbreviation: Dominion Alliance
- Formation: 1877
- Dissolved: 1920s
- Purpose: Prohibition of alcohol sales
- Region served: Canada
- Members: Largely Protestant anglophone
- Official language: English

The Dominion Alliance for the Total Suppression of the Liquor Traffic was an organization established in 1877 in Canada that lobbied for prohibition of alcohol. Membership was largely Protestant and Anglophone. The Dominion Alliance faced passive resistance from politicians concerned about the views of their constituents, particularly in Quebec, but had some success at the local level. Sale of alcohol was prohibited provincially and then nationally during World War I (1914–18). After the war the national and provincial temperance laws were repealed and the Dominion Alliance faded into irrelevance.

== Foundation ==
The first temperance societies in Canada were founded in 1827, led by Protestant revivalist denominations. In 1875 a general convention of organizations working for suppression of the liquor traffic in eastern Canada recommended formation of a Dominion Prohibitory Council, representing all of Canada. The council met in Ottawa in 1876 and decided to found the Dominion Alliance for the Total Suppression of the Liquor Traffic, which was established the next year. The Dominion Alliance lobbied for temperance legislation, as a counterpart to the Woman's Christian Temperance Union (WCTU). The provincial organizations became branches of the Dominion Alliance, which was governed nationally by the Council of the Dominion Alliance. The objective was "the immediate prohibition of the liquor traffic", but the Dominion Alliance supported any legislation that moved towards that goal.

The Dominion Alliance was incorporated in 1887. In 1901 the Privy Council ruled that federal legislation applied to manufacture and import of intoxicating liquor, but the retail trade was regulated provincially. The Dominion Alliance then oriented its efforts on the provincial branches, which became relatively independent.

== Membership ==
The Dominion Alliance was active across Canada, but was anti-Catholic, racist and sometimes anti-Semitic, which limited its effectiveness. Members included mainly English-speaking Protestant organizations such as WCTU and YMCA branches, Salvation Army Corps and Baptist Young People's Unions. Until 1907 the organization was guided by its secretary, Francis Stephens Spence, who was its secretary and sole full-time employee.

Spence lost credibility with the radical Advanced Prohibitions of the Dominion Alliance when he supported Oliver Mowat's government in Ontario, and Mowat avoided passing a prohibition law on constitutional grounds. In 1907 Spence's brother, the Reverend Ben Spence, succeeded Francis Spence as secretary of the Ontario branch.

== Activities ==
The Dominion alliance produced books, pamphlets and flyers, organized meetings and backed temperance laws at all levels of government. The alliance prepared a draft bill that was submitted to the government in 1878. After a number of amendments this became the Canada Temperance Act. Under this act local governments were given right to hold votes on temperance and if successful to ban the sale of alcohol. The Dominion Alliance managed to have various liquor laws enacted at the local and provincial levels.

In 1892 the Dominion Alliance persuaded the Conservative federal government to set up a Royal Commission on the Liquor Traffic. The commission eventually published a report that favored licensing laws over prohibition. In 1898 the Dominion Alliance forced Wilfrid Laurier, the Liberal prime minister, to hold a plebiscite on prohibition. Laurier was reluctant to make liquor a major issue since it was not supported by all members of his weak coalition of French and English supporters. As Laurier had suspected, the plebiscite showed that anglophones and rural people supported prohibition, while francophones, immigrants and urban people did not. Laurier used low turn-out to justify inaction.

In 1900 Prince Edward Island outlawed retail sale of alcohol in the province. In 1902 George William Ross, a member of the Dominion Alliance and premier of Ontario, passed legislation banning sale of alcohol subject to ratification by a large majority in a referendum. A majority voted in favor in the referendum, but Ross did not consider the majority was large enough and did not pass the legislation. He was expelled from the Dominion Alliance in 1903. Spence helped direct initiatives at the local level in Ontario, gaining support for the prohibitionist policies of Ross's successor James Whitney. In 1906 la Ligue Anti-alcoölique was founded as a French-language counterpart of the Dominion Alliance. Most Francophone Catholics considered prohibition to be an extreme measure. The Ligue proposed legal restrictions but not total prohibition.

In 1915 the Dominion Alliance began working with the federal and Ontario governments to treat prohibition as a part of the war effort. All provinces apart from Quebec banned the sale of alcohol in 1915 and 1916. The War Measures Act of 1917 included National Prohibition. The War Measures Act expired in 1918 and prohibition ended in Quebec, but not elsewhere. The federal bans on manufacture and sale of alcohol were dropped soon after the war ended, and in the 1920s most provinces replaced prohibition laws with laws regulating sale of alcohol. Prince Edward Island was again the exception, and did not repeal prohibition until 1948. The alliance became seen as an outdated Victorian group, and disintegrated. In 1924 the Ontario Branch of the Dominion Alliance was renamed the Ontario Prohibition Union. The Canadian Temperance Federation and the Ontario Temperance Federation finally ceased activity in 1967.

== Sources ==
- Decarie, Graeme (2013-07-23). "Temperance Movement". Canadian Encyclopedia. Historica Canada.
- Dupré, Ruth; Vencatachellum, Désiré (March 2005). "Canadians and Prohibition: An Analysis of the 1898 Referendum" (PDF). HEC Montréal.
- Wallace, W. Stewart (1948). "The Dominion Alliance". The Encyclopedia of Canada. Vol. II. Toronto: University Associates of Canada.
- Warsh, Cheryl Krasnick (2013-08-27). "Dominion Alliance for the Total Suppression of the Liquor Traffic". Alcohol and Drugs in North America: A Historical Encyclopedia: 2 volumes. ABC-CLIO. ISBN 978-1-59884-479-5.
