= The Snow Queen =

1844 fairy tale by Hans Christian Andersen

- Short story by Hans Christian Andersen
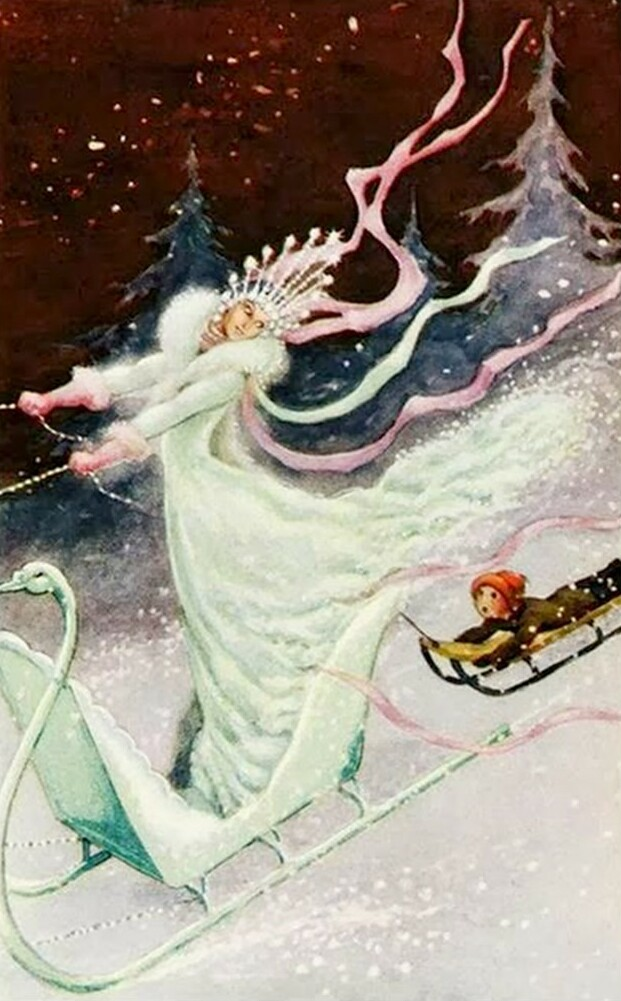
- "The Snow Queen" illustration by Rudolf Koivu

Text available at Wikisource
- Original title: Snedronningen
- Country: Denmark
- Language: Danish
- Genre: Fairy tale

Publication
- Published in: New Fairy Tales. First Volume. Second Collection (Nye Eventyr. Første Bind. Anden Samling)
- Publication type: Fairy tale collection
- Publication date: 21 December 1844

External videos
- Snezhnaya Koroleva [The Snow Queen] [USSR] [1957] on You Channel - English Subtittles
- The Snow Queen (Russian: Снежная королева, Snezhnaya koroleva) is a 1957 Soviet animated film directed by Lev Atamanov. It was produced at the Soyuzmultfilm studio in Moscow and is based on the story of the same name by Hans Christian Andersen. on YouTube

"The Snow Queen" (Danish: Snedronningen) is an 1844 original fairy tale by Danish author Hans Christian Andersen. It was first published 21 December 1844 in New Fairy Tales. First Volume. Second Collection (Nye Eventyr. Første Bind. Anden Samling). The story centers on the struggle between good and evil as experienced by Gerda and her friend, Kai. The Snow Queen is written in a novel-styled narrative and divided into seven chapters, unlike Andersen's other stories.

The story is one of Andersen's longest and most highly acclaimed stories. It is regularly included in selected tales and collections of his work and is frequently reprinted in illustrated storybook editions for children.

== Story ==
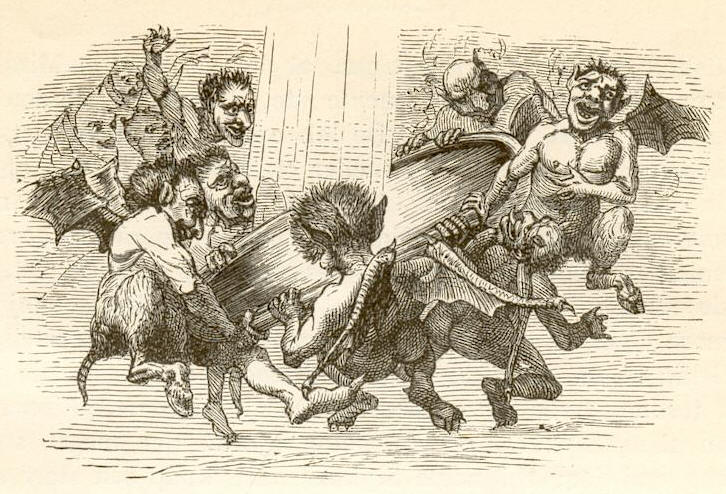
Vilhelm Pedersen illustration.

=== A mirror and its fragments ===
The devil, in the form of a troll, has made a magic mirror that distorts the appearance of everything that it reflects. The mirror does not reflect the good and beautiful aspects of people and things but magnifies their bad and ugly aspects. The troll's minions take the mirror all over the world to distort everything, then carry it up to Heaven to mock God and the Angels. As they approach Heaven, the mirror trembles and falls, shattering into billions of pieces. Some become windowpanes, some spectacles, and some get stuck in people's hearts and eyes, giving them a cold and bitter disposition. The troll laughs himself sore at his mischief.

=== Kai and Gerda ===
Vilhelm Pedersen illustration

Years later, a little boy called Kai (often spelled "Kay" or "Kaj" in translations) and a little girl Gerda live next door to each other in the garrets of buildings with adjoining roofs in a large city. They could get from one's home to the other's just by stepping over the gutters of each building. The two families grow vegetables and roses in window boxes placed on the gutters. Gerda and Kai have a window box garden to play in, and they become devoted to each other as playmates, and as close as if they were siblings.

Gerda's grandmother tells the children about the Snow Queen, who is ruler over the "snow bees"—snowflakes that look like bees. As bees have a queen, so do the snow bees, and she is seen where the snowflakes cluster the most. Looking out of his frosted window one winter, Kai sees the Snow Queen, who beckons him to come with her. Kai draws back in fear from the window.

By the following spring, Gerda has learned a song that she sings to Kai: Roses flower in the vale; there we hear Child Jesus' tale! Because roses adorn the window box garden, the sight of roses always reminds Gerda of her love for Kai.

On a summer day, splinters of the troll's mirror get into Kai's heart and eye. Kai becomes cruel and aggressive. He destroys their window-box garden, he makes fun of Gerda's grandmother, and he no longer cares about Gerda, since everyone now appears bad and ugly to him. When winter comes again, the only things he finds no fault in are snowflakes, which he studies through a magnifying glass. Kai goes out with his sled to play in the snowy market square and hitches it to a sleigh driven by a mysterious robed figure. The sleigh drives through the town gate, going faster and faster through the countryside, then stops, and the driver reveals herself to be the Snow Queen. She kisses Kai to numb him from the cold, and again to make him forget about Gerda and his family. They then fly together in the sleigh up into the clouds.

=== The magician woman's garden ===
The people of the city conclude that Kai died in the nearby river. When spring arrives, Gerda goes to the river and offers it her favorite red shoes if the river will return Kai. The shoes wash back to shore, so she climbs into a nearby boat to throw them out farther. The boat is unmoored, drifts away from the shore and becomes caught in the current.

Gerda drifts until she reaches the home of an old woman, who pulls her to shore with her crooked staff. The woman is a sorceress and wants Gerda to stay with her forever, so she causes Gerda to forget Kai, and causes all the roses in her garden to sink beneath the earth, since she knows that the sight of them will remind Gerda of her friend. The woman lets Gerda play in her flower garden day after day, where all of the flowers are in bloom, until one day she notices a rose on the woman's hat. She remembers Kai and begins to cry, and her tears raise one of the rose bushes from the ground. The roses assure her that Kai is not dead, since they could see all of the dead while they were underground. Gerda questions the other flowers; each sings its own song, but none have anything to say about Kai. Gerda flees the garden and discovers that autumn has arrived while she was there.

=== The prince and the princess ===
Gerda meets a crow, who tells her that he might have seen Kai. He explains that a clever princess in the land decided that she should marry as soon as she could find a man good for conversation. For two days men met the princess in hopes of marrying her, but upon meeting her they were tongue-tied. On the third day, a small fellow with shabby clothes walked confidently into the palace and won over the princess by listening to her. Gerda sneaks into the palace with the crow but finds that the prince is not Kai after all. She is offered hospitality in the palace, but instead asks for a horse, carriage and boots so she can continue looking for Kai.

=== The little robber girl ===
While traveling in the carriage Gerda is captured by robbers. Her life is spared when a little robber girl demands to have Gerda as a playmate. They ride together to the robbers' castle, where the girl's pet doves tell Gerda that they saw Kai when he was carried away by the Snow Queen in the direction of Lapland. The captive reindeer Bae tells her that he knows how to get to Lapland since it is his home.

=== The Lapp woman and Finn woman ===
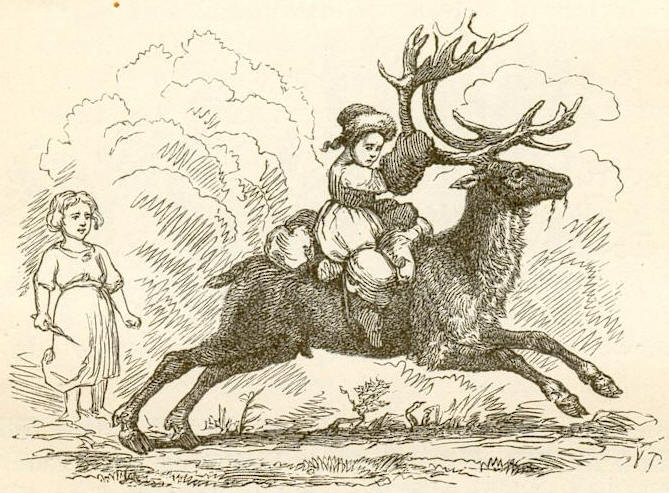
Vilhelm Pedersen illustration

The robber girl frees Gerda and the reindeer to travel north to the Snow Queen's palace. They make two stops: first at the Lapp woman's home and then at the Finn woman's home. The Finn woman tells the reindeer that the secret of Gerda's unique power to save Kai is in her sweet and innocent child's heart:

"I can give her no greater power than she has already," said the woman; "don't you see how strong that is? How men and animals are obliged to serve her, and how well she has got through the world, barefooted as she is. She cannot receive any power from me greater than she now has, which consists in her own purity and innocence of heart. If she cannot herself obtain access to the Snow Queen, and remove the glass fragments from little Kai, we can do nothing to help her..."

=== In the Snow Queen's palace ===
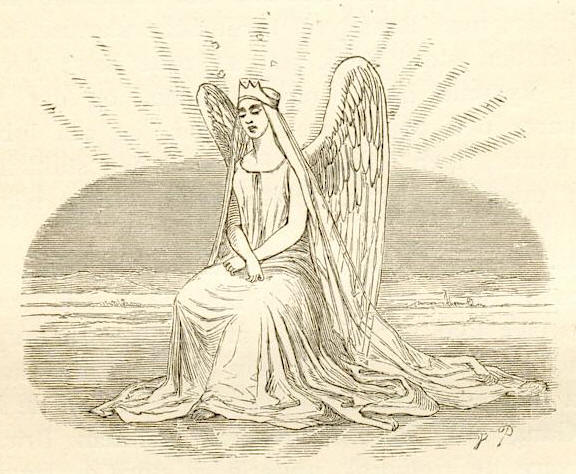
Vilhelm Pedersen illustration

When Gerda reaches the Snow Queen's palace, she is halted by the snowflakes guarding it. She prays the Lord's Prayer, which causes her breath to take the shape of angels, who resist the snowflakes and allow Gerda to enter the palace. Gerda finds Kai alone and almost immobile on a frozen lake, which the Snow Queen calls the "Mirror of Reason", on which her throne sits. Kai is engaged in the task that the Snow Queen gave him: he must use pieces of ice like a Chinese puzzle to form characters and words. If he is able to form the word that the Snow Queen told him to spell, she will release him from her power and give him a pair of skates.

Gerda runs up to Kai and kisses him, and he is saved by the power of her love: Gerda weeps warm tears on him, melting his heart and burning away the mirror splinter in it. As a result, Kai bursts into tears, which dislodges the splinter from his eye, and becomes cheerful and healthy again. He remembers Gerda, and the two dance around so joyously that the splinters of ice that Kai had been playing with are caught up into the dance. When they tire of dancing the splinters fall down to spell "eternity," the very word Kai was trying to spell. Kai and Gerda leave the Snow Queen's domain with the help of the reindeer, the Finn woman, and the Lapp woman. They meet the robber girl, and from there they walk back to their home. Kai and Gerda find that everything at home is the same, and that it is they who have changed; they are now grown up, and are also delighted to see that it is summertime.

At the end, the grandmother reads a passage from the Bible:

"Unless you become like children, you are not entering God's kingdom." (Matthew 18:3).

== Characters ==
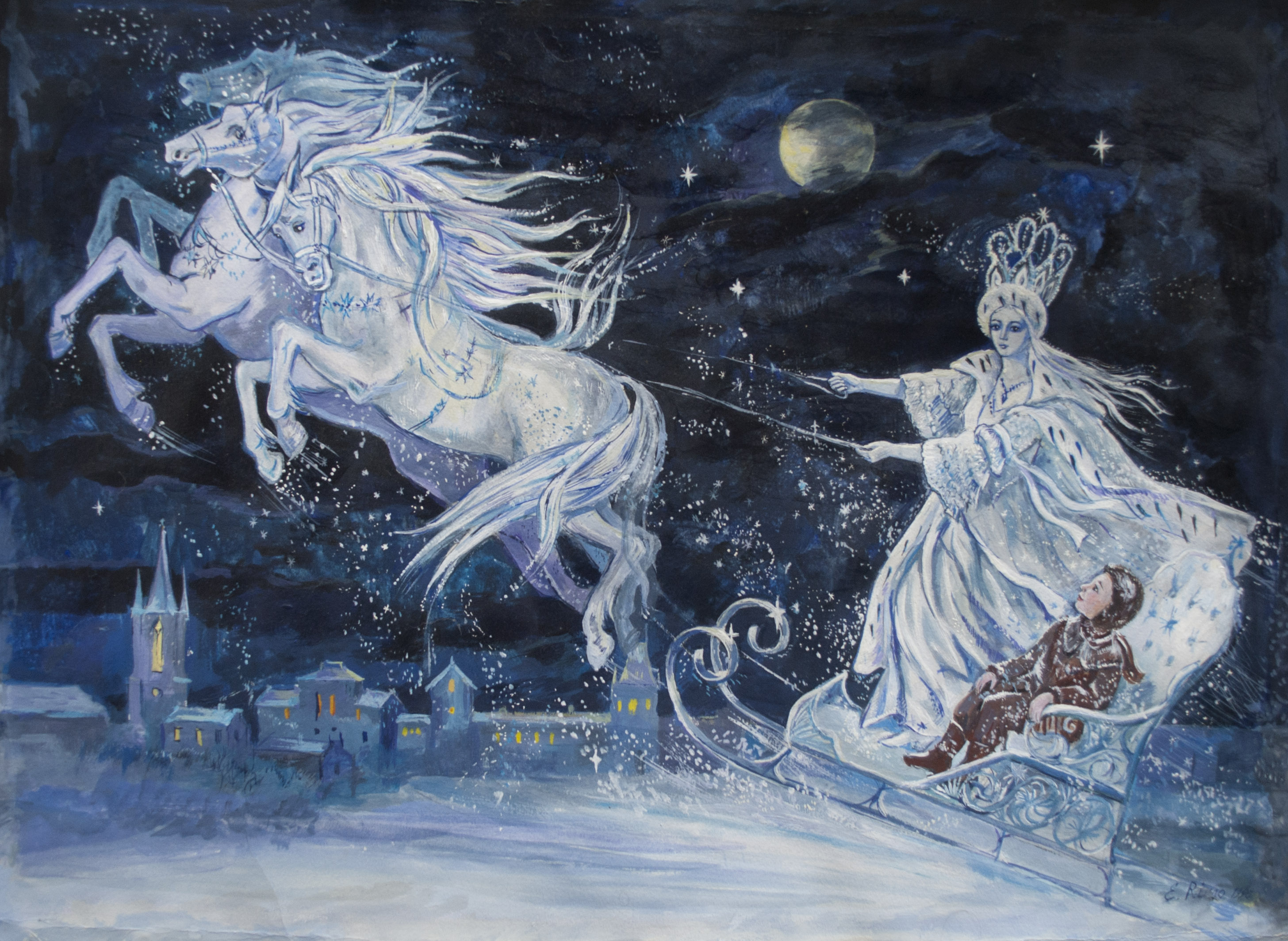
Elena Ringo illustration.

- Gerda (English: /ˈɡɜːrdə/), a little girl who succeeds in finding her friend Kai and saving him from the Snow Queen.
- Kai (English: /kaɪ/) in Danish and Norwegian (often spelled Kay or Kaj in other European languages including English), a little boy who lives in a large city, in the garret of a building across the street from the home of Gerda, his playmate, whom he loves dearly. He falls victim to the splinters of the troll-mirror and the blandishments of the Snow Queen.
- The Snow Queen (Snedronningen), the queen of the snowflakes or "snow-bees", who travels throughout the world with the snow. Her palace and gardens are in the lands of permafrost, specifically Spitsbergen. She takes Kai back to this palace after he has fallen victim to the splinters of the troll-mirror. She promises to free Kai if he can spell "eternity" with the pieces of ice in her palace.
- The Troll (Trolden) or the Devil (Djævlen), who makes an evil mirror that distorts reality and later shatters to infect people with its splinters that distort sight and freeze hearts. Some English translations of "The Snow Queen" translate this character as the "sprite" or the "hobgoblin".
- The Grandmother (Bedstemoderen), Gerda's grandmother, who tells Kai and Gerda the legend of the Snow Queen.
- The Old Lady who Knew Magic (den gamle Kone der kunne Trolddom), who maintains a cottage on the river, with a garden that is permanently in summer. She seeks to keep Gerda with her, but Gerda's thought of roses (the flower most favoured by herself and Kai) awakens her from the old woman's enchantment.
- The Crow (Kragen), who thinks that the new prince of his land is Kai.
- The Tame Crow (den tamme Krage), who is the mate of the field crow and has the run of the princess's palace. She lets Gerda into the royal bedchamber in her search for Kai.
- The Princess (Prinsessen), who desires a prince-consort as intelligent as she, and who finds Gerda in her palace. She helps Gerda in her search for Kai by giving her warm, rich clothing, servants, and a golden coach.
- The Prince (Prinsen), formerly a poor young man, who comes to the palace and passes the test set by the princess to become prince.
- The Old Robber Woman (den gamle Røverkælling), the only woman among the robbers who capture Gerda as she travels through their region in a golden coach.
- The Little Robber Girl (den lille Røverpige), daughter of the robber hag. She takes Gerda as a playmate, whereupon her captive doves and reindeer Bae tell Gerda that Kai is with the Snow Queen. The Robber Girl then helps Gerda continue her journey to find Kai.
- Bae (English: /beɪ/; Bæ), the reindeer who carries Gerda to the Snow Queen's palace.
- The Lappish Woman (Lappekonen), who provides shelter to Gerda and Kai, and writes a message on a dried cod fish to the Finnish Woman further on the way to the Snow Queen's gardens.
- The Finnish Woman (Finnekonen), who lives just two miles away from the Snow Queen's gardens and palace. She knows the secret of Gerda's power to save Kai.

== Background ==
Andersen met Swedish opera singer Jenny Lind in 1840 and became infatuated with her, but she was not interested in him romantically (although the two became friends). According to Carole Rosen, Andersen was inspired to model the icy-hearted Snow Queen on Lind after she rejected him as a suitor.

== Adaptations ==
=== Theatrical films ===
- The Snow Queen (1957), a Soviet animated film by film studio Soyuzmultfilm and directed by Lev Atamanov, later dubbed by Universal Studios with the voices of Sandra Dee as Gerda, Tommy Kirk as Kay and introduced by Art Linkletter. In the 1990s, the film was redubbed again, this time featuring the voices of Kathleen Turner, Mickey Rooney, Kirsten Dunst and Laura San Giacomo.
- The Snow Queen (1967), a live-action adaptation from the Soviet Union, directed by Gennadi Kazansky.
- Lumikuningatar (1986), a Finnish live-action adaptation.
- The Snow Queen (1995), a British animated adaptation, directed by Martin Gates and featuring the voices of Helen Mirren (as the title character), David Jason, Hugh Laurie, Rik Mayall, and Imelda Staunton. This adaptation deviates significantly from the original fairy tale. A sequel, titled The Snow Queen's Revenge, was released the following year.
- Marko Raat's Lumekuninganna (2010) takes the story to contemporary time and motivates the character inspired by Kai with love towards an older dying woman.
- The Snow Queen, a CG-animated feature film adaptation produced by Russian studio Wizart Animation, Bazelevs Company, and Inlay Film which was released theatrically in Russia on 31 December 2012, internationally on 3 January 2013, and was released in U.S. theaters on 11 October 2013 and U.S. DVD on 26 November 2013. Four theatrical sequels were also released: The Snow Queen 2: The Snow King, The Snow Queen 3: Fire and Ice, The Snow Queen: Mirrorlands and The Snow Queen & The Princess.
- The Mystery of Snow Queen (Tayna snezhnoy korolevy) (2015), Russian film directed by Natalya Bondarchuk.

=== Television ===
- Die Schneekönigin (1964), West German TV movie directed by Wolfgang Spier.
- Hans Christian Andersen Stories (1971) is a Japanese anime series by Mushi Productions and Zuiyo Enterprises and aired on Fuji TV. The 50th and 51st episodes are an adaptation in two parts of the story.
- The Snow Queen (1976), a live-action/animated TV movie released by BBC Enterprises (before restructured as BBC Worldwide), produced by Ian Keill and directed by Andrew Gosling.
- The Snow Queen, a Skating Ballet (1983), choreographed by John Curry and Jean-Pierre Bonnefoux; starring Curry, Janet Lynn, Toller Cranston, Dorothy Hamill and Sandra Bezic and aired on PBS.
- Manga Fairy Tales of the World (1977) is a Japanese anime TV series that features a half-hour episode adaptation of the story.
- Faerie Tale Theatre (1985), a television anthology produced by Shelley Duvall, has a one-hour live-action adaptation starring Melissa Gilbert as Gerda, Lance Kerwin as Kay, and Lee Remick as the Snow Queen.
- Tayna snezhnoy korolevy (The Secret of the Snow Queen) (1986), another live-action adaptation from the Soviet Union, featuring Alisa Freindlich as the Snow Queen.
- The Snow Queen (1992), an American animated TV short, narrated by Sigourney Weaver.
- Happily Ever After: Fairy Tales for Every Child (1997), an animated television anthology series, has an Inuk-influenced retelling featuring Eartha Kitt as the title character. In this version, the Snow Queen is impaled by a flying icicle.
- Snedronningen (2000), a Danish live-action television short adaptation, directed by Jacob Jørgensen and Kristof Kuncewicz.
- Snow Queen (2002), a television movie by Hallmark, directed by David Wu and starring Bridget Fonda, Jeremy Guilbaut, Chelsea Hobbs, Robert Wisden, and Wanda Cannon.
- The Fairytaler (alternately titled as Tales from H.C. Andersen), a Danish animated television anthology, has a two-part half-hour adaptation directed by Jorgen Lerdam in 2003.
- The Snow Queen (2005), a BBC television adaptation utilising effects, merging live-action and computer-generated art. Featuring songs by Paul K. Joyce and starring Juliet Stevenson and the voice of Patrick Stewart, the film was adapted from a 2003 operatic concert held at the Barbican Arts Centre.
- The Snow Queen (雪の女王) (2005–2006), a Japanese anime TV series, produced by NHK and animated by TMS Entertainment.
- Koscherfilm has been working on its own adaptation of The Snow Queen based on the children's book Gerda and Kai-The Snow Queen Book. Richard Koscher announced the script still looks for the right studio and it was released on Christmas 2012.
- Die Schneekönigin (2014), German TV movie directed by Karola Hattop.

=== Novels ===
- The Snow Queen (1980), a science fiction version by Joan D. Vinge
- The Snow Queen (2000), a speculative fiction version by Eileen Kernaghan

=== Video games ===
- A text adventure, The Snow Queen, was released by Mosaic Publishing for the ZX Spectrum and Commodore 64 home computers in 1985.
- Rise of the Snow Queen, the 3rd installment of the Dark Parables Hidden Object PC computer game, is based on both The Snow Queen, & the Snow White fairytale.
- In a game by Project Moon, Lobotomy Corporation, one of the "Abnormalities" in the game is based on the Snow Queen fairytale.
- In Revelations: Persona, one of the optional routes is called "Snow Queen's Quest", which involves rescuing one of the protagonist's teachers who has been possessed by the Snow Queen by collecting shards of the Demon Mirror, a clear reference to the broken mirror.

=== Operas ===
- The children's opera История Кая и Герды (The Story of Kai and Gerda) was written in 1980 by Russian composer Sergei Petrovich Banevich, (libretto by Tatiana Kalinina). It premiered at the Mariinsky Theatre (then Kirov Theatre) on 24 December 1980.
- The children's opera The Snow Queen was premiered in 1993 in Toronto as part of the Milk Festival. This is a 60-minute version of the story by Canadian composer John Greer and English librettist Jeremy James Taylor. It was commissioned and premiered by the Canadian Children's Opera Company, and subsequently performed by them in 2001 and 2019. They also toured the work to the Netherlands and Germany in the summer of 2001.
- The opera La Regina delle Nevi was written in 2010 by Italian composer Pierangelo Valtinoni (Libretto by Paolo Madron) and premiered at the Komische Oper Berlin on 24 October 2010. The opera has since been translated into English, German, Spanish and Swedish and has been performed in numerous countries.
- A family opera "Snödrottningen" in one act with prologue and 13 scenes is composed during 2013-2016 by Swedish composer Benjamin Staern (Libretto by Anelia Kadieva Jonsson) to be premiered at the Malmö Opera on 17 December 2016.
- The Snow Queen, a chamber opera for radio or stage based on Andersen's story, composed by David Ward and libretto by Kevin Ireland.
- Snedronningen (The Snow Queen) is a free adaptation by the composer Hans Abrahamsen which premiered at the Danish Opera House on 13 October 2019 and received its first performance in English at the National Theater in Munich on 21 December 2019.

=== Stage plays and musicals ===
The story has been adapted into numerous stage plays and musicals, notably including:

- In 1969 Josef Weinberger produced "The Snow Queen", a Musical Play in Two Acts. Based on the story by Hans Andersen, Book and Lyrics by Winifred Palmer, Musical Score adapted by King Palmer from the Music of Edvard Grieg. The author altered Hans Andersens' hero 'Kay' to 'Karl'.
- A rock musical adaptation entitled "The Snow Queen: A New Musical". was produced by San Jose Repertory Theatre in December 2013, with music by Haddon Kime, book by Rick Lombardo and Kirsten Brandt, and lyrics by Kime, Brandt, and Lombardo. This adaptation received positive reviews, after also being produced at the 2014 New York Musical Theatre Festival.
- An adaptation written by Preston Lane that uses Appalachian culture to tell the story premiered at Triad Stage in 2013.
- Another adaptation of "The Snow Queen" made its world premiere at the Hippodrome State Theatre in Gainesville, FL in November 2015. This adaptation was written and directed by Charlie Mitchell, with original songs by Mitchell and Brian Mercer.
- "The Snow Queen" was adapted as a radio play by Garrison Keillor, released on 2 September 2010
- "The Snow Queen" by Missoula children's theatre played in several locations including Estevan and Humboldt.
- "The Snow Queen" was adapted as an audiobook by Jennifer Charles, released by Ojet Records on 23 December 2020
- An adaptation of the "Snow Queen" by Morna Young, drawing on Celtic mythology and set in late 19th Century Scotland, was staged at the Lyceum Theatre, Edinburgh, from 23 November to 31 December 2023.

=== Dance productions ===
- The first full-length ballet production of The Snow Queen was choreographed and produced by Aerin Holt and California Contemporary Ballet in December 1998 with an original score by Randall Michael Tobin. The ballet ran for 16 consecutive Decembers from 1998 to 2013. In December 2017 The Snow Queen Ballet returns for three performances in celebration of the 20th anniversary of California Contemporary Ballet.
- An Off-Broadway dance theater adaptation of The Snow Queen was choreographed and produced by Angela Jones and Noel MacDuffie in 1999 with an original score by John LaSala. The soundtrack was released as an album on TownHall Records in 2000.
- On 11 October 2007, the English National Ballet premiered a three-act version of The Snow Queen, choreographed by Michael Corder with a score drawn from the music of Sergei Prokofiev's The Stone Flower, arranged by Julian Philips.
- On 23 November 2012, the Finnish National Ballet premiered a two-act version of The Snow Queen, choreographed by Kenneth Greve, music by Tuomas Kantelinen.
- On 22 March 2016, the Grand Theatre, Poznań premiered a two-act version of The Snow Queen, directed by Anna Niedźwiedź, music by Gabriel Kaczmarek.
- On 8 April 2017, the Eugene Ballet (OR) premiered a new full-length ballet, The Snow Queen, choreographed by Toni Pimble with original music by Kenji Bunch. The music was released on the Innova Records label to great acclaim.
- Scottish Ballet staged a full-length Snow Queen ballet in two acts, choreographed by Christopher Hampson and Ashley Page, to a score arranged from music by Nikolai Rimsky-Korsakov in 2018; filmed by BBC television in 2019, rebroadcast 2020. The scenario borrows elements, such as the Snow Queen's sister, the wolves and the splintering palace, from the Walt Disney movie Frozen.

== Inspired works ==
=== Literature ===
- The Lion, the Witch, and the Wardrobe (1950): It is possible that the White Witch from C. S. Lewis's novel may be inspired by the Snow Queen, as she turned Narnia into a snow-covered land, is also depicted as wearing a white fur coat and first appears riding in a sleigh, and kidnapped a boy.
- French artist Stéphane Blanquet illustrated a version of the Snow Queen published in France in 2010 by Gallimard Jeunesse (ISBN 9782070641154)
- Ophelia and the Marvelous Boy by Karen Foxleen is a children's book set in modern times featuring the Snow Queen and other elements from the fairy tale.

=== Film and television ===
- The 1982 Soviet movie Tears Were Falling is centered around a respectable family man get a shard of the troll's mirror in his eye. The change in his personality caused by that ruins his life to the point of a suicide attempt.
- A first-season episode of A Different World, "Rudy and the Snow Queen" (1987), involves the character of Whitley Gilbert (Jasmine Guy) retelling the story of the Snow Queen to The Cosby Show's Rudy Huxtable (Keshia Knight-Pulliam), who has become so admiring of Whitley that she is ignoring Denise (Lisa Bonet), the older sister that Rudy came to visit. In Whitley's version of the tale, Kai is Gerda's little sister, and Rudy envisions Whitley as the beautiful queen. The crossover episode also includes a cameo appearance by the creator of both series, Bill Cosby, in character as Dr. Heathcliff Huxtable.
- The song Schneekönigin (Snow Queen), by the German folk metal group Subway to Sally, tells of the Snow Queen coming to get the narrator, presumably Kai, to bring him back to her land of ice and silence.
- The Snow Queen appears in the Flint the Time Detective episode "Nightcap". Flint Hammerhead's group and Petra Fina's group were brought into the dreams of Hans Christian Anderson by the titular Time Shifter and encounter the Snow Queen among Anderson's creation.
- Barbie in the Pink Shoes (2013) is the twenty-fourth film in the Barbie film series and features the Snow Queen as the primary antagonist.
- Walt Disney Animation Studios' 2013 animated film Frozen was loosely inspired by The Snow Queen. It was originally intended to be a direct adaptation of Andersen's story in early development before being changed into a more original story.
- In the television series Once Upon a Time (2011–2018), the first half of its fourth season is inspired by the fairy tale, drawing elements from it as well as from Frozen. The Snow Queen is named Ingrid (portrayed by Elizabeth Mitchell), who is the long-lost aunt of Elsa (Georgina Haig) and Anna (Elizabeth Lail), characters originated from Frozen, with similar powers; Ingrid's "Spell of Shattered Sight", a central element of the storyline, is inspired by the magic mirror of the original tale.
- Lucile Hadžihalilović's film The Ice Tower was inspired by The Snow Queen, starring Marion Cotillard portraying an actress who is playing the title character in a film adaptation of the novel.
