= The Snow Queen (2012 film) =

- Theatrical release poster
- Directed by: Vladlen Barbe; Maxim Sveshnikov
- Written by: Vladlen Barbe; Vadim Sveshnikov; Maxim Sveshnikov
- Based on: The Snow Queen by Hans Christian Andersen
- Produced by: Timur Bekmambetov; Alexander Ligaiy; Yuri Moskvin; Sergey Rapoport; Olga Sinelshchikova
- Starring: Anna Shurochkina; Ivan Okhlobystin; Yuri Stoyanov; Lyudmila Artemyeva; Dmitry Nagiev; Ramilya Iskander; Galina Tyunina; Olga Shorokhova; Mikhail Tikhonov; Olga Zubkova; Anna Ardova; Liza Arzamasova
- Edited by: Jonathan Abelardo; Vitaliy Konovalov; Anton Maslennikov; Mark Mercado; Ivan Titov; Denis Vakulenko
- Music by: Brainstorm; Mark Willott
- Animation by: Alexey Zamyslov; Alexey Lyamkin; Artur Mirzoyan
- Production companies: Wizart Animation; InlayFilm; Bazelevs Company
- Distributed by: Bazelevs Distribution; CCS Media
- Release date: 31 December 2012 (Russia)
- Running time: 74 minutes
- Country: Russia
- Language: Russian
- Budget: $7 million
- Box office: $13.5 million

The Snow Queen (Russian: Снежная королева, romanized: Snezhnaya koroleva, lit. 'The Snow Queen') is a 2012 Russian animated fantasy adventure film directed by Vladlen Barbe and Maxim Sveshnikov. The film is a based on the 1844 fairy tale of the same name by Hans Christian Andersen. Set after the Snow Queen invoked the spell of eternal winter, the film follows the story of Gerda who sets out on an improbable frigid journey up North to save her brother Kai.

The Snow Queen was one of the most anticipated projects of the Russian film industry in 2012. Inspirational evaluation of The Snow Queen at international film markets set its stage for international distribution. The film was released on 31 December 2012 in Russia. In the United States, it was released on 11 October 2013. After receiving generally positive reviews from critics, an Annecy International Animated Film Festival review noted the film's ambition is reminiscent of the golden age of Russian animation. The film also achieved significant commercial success, with the total box office amounting to $13.6 million, nearly doubling its $7 million budget. The film became a milestone in the history of Russian animation as it received accolades from Moscow Film Festival and Zelenograd International Youth Film Festival.

A sequel, The Snow Queen 2, was released in 2014.

== Plot ==
The Snow Queen covered the world in ice. Only Master Vegard stands in her way, whose mirrors reflect not only appearances but also souls. One day the polar wind takes away Vegard and his wife Una, but they hide their children Gerda and Kai. Years later, the Snow Queen's servile troll Orm (who can shape shift into a black weasel) locates Kai, who is deemed Vegard's successor, at the orphanage St. Peter's Kids Shelter. At the orphanage Gerda sews mittens. After a tangle between both siblings and Orm, Kai is abducted by the North Wind, a polar cold spell that can only be invoked by the Snow Queen. The polar vortex shuttles Kai to the Snow Queen's palace. Gerda embarks on a journey with Orm and her pet white weasel Luta across the icy lands to rescue her brother.

They first enter a garden dome run by an old lady who seems nice, but her true intentions are to drug and enslave Gerda to grow and sell flowers. Orm and Luta catch wind of the scheme and thwart it. The lady sends out her carnivorous plant, Ivy, but the trio make their escape. Meanwhile, in the ice palace, Kai arrives and the Snow Queen leads him to her throne room. The Queen's mirror, after examining Kai, reveals that Master Vegard has two heirs. Kai tries to hide the truth, but the Snow Queen reads it in his heart and sees Kai's painting of Gerda.

Gerda thanks Orm for saving her life and they begin to warm up to each other. Then the three stumble into Imana's caves, the birthplace of trolls. Orm briefs about how the trolls' age of peace was tainted by the Snow Queen and turned their clans to fight each other, until only the cowardly Orm survived, and the souls of the trolls remained trapped in Lake Gao. While Gerda and Luta look around, Orm is contacted by the Snow Queen with orders to bring Gerda to her. Orm helps Gerda and Luta cross the evil Lake Gao, and Gerda avoids its curse, much to Orm's amazement.

Outside the cave, the trio encounter a king on a royal hunt. The king tries to hunt Orm (in weasel form) and Luta, but he bumps into a tree. The trio are escorted to the king's castle. The king has had a trouble in which his children have literally half-shares in his property after the Snow Queen split the castle in half and Queen Anself was lost. The king takes Gerda as his prisoner, until she shows compassion for her brother. The king and his children have an argument and start a fire, but Gerda saves them. As a reward the trio are given a sleigh for their journey.

The trio are captured by pirates and taken to their ship, but Gerda is able to persuade them to let them continue their quest, and the captain's daughter gives them a reindeer for the journey. Meanwhile, in the Snow Queen's ice palace, Kai is frozen by the Snow Queen. Gerda meets the Lady of Lapland in a tent, who recounts the Snow Queen's origin. As a girl, Irma, who had a gift of magic, was ostracized and went to Imana's caves where her ill wish upon the people, granted by the Lake Gao, turned her into the Snow Queen. The Lady of Lapland grants the trio a snow boat and sends them to the Snow Queen. The palace of the Snow Queen is located in Spitsbergen.

Orm tries to protect Gerda and make her change her mind, but Gerda is dead set on saving her brother. At the Kingdom of Eternal Frost, Gerda finds her brother frozen. Then the Snow Queen appears. Orm turns down his reward to be free and beseeches the queen to spare Gerda. Since the queen will not listen to reason, Orm ceases to serve her. The Queen summons ice trolls and giants, but Orm transforms into a polar bear to defeat the monsters and allow Gerda to reach the throne room. Both Orm and Luta are cornered by the North Wind.

Gerda finds the queen's mirror and walks through it, entering the mirror realm. The Snow Queen tries to freeze her heart but, guided by the spirits of her family, she regains hope and retaliates with the magic mirror. The Snow Queen's curse is finally broken, Irma is transformed back and Gerda banishes the evil curse from returning. Irma revives Kai, Orm turns back into a troll, Luta wakes him up and the eternal winter is finally ended. With that Gerda, Kai, Orm, Irma and Luta all set off home. Gerda and Orm finally accept each other as best friends.

During the end credits, there are scenes showing the lives of people they met throughout their journey after the Snow Queen's defeat and started living happily.

== Cast ==
Character	Russian voice	English voice	Description
Gerda	Nyusha	Jessica Straus	The main heroine from The Snow Queen. She's a brave, kind and honest girl with a strong will. Growing up in an orphanage, she is always quick to embark on any adventure and has a warm perceptive heart.
Orm / Troll	Ivan Okhlobystin	Doug Erholtz	Orm is a very ordinary troll. Despite not seen at "troll" standards, Orm's strengths are not physical. His true merits lie elsewhere, namely in cunning and savviness.
Snow Queen	Galina Tyunina	Cindy Robinson	The ruler of an icy palace in the Laplands. The Queen has the power to invoke polar winds that turn the lands into a winter land.
Kai	Ramilya Iskander	Marin Miller	Gerda's brother. A dreamer, artist and poet. He is willing to help alongside Alfida and Gerda. Kai is the only one remaining in the world with artisan knowledge of Master Vegard's soul mirror.
Luta	Erin Fitzgerald	Erin Fitzgerald	Luta is a white ferret. She is Orm's true friend conscience and most agile character. She will risk her life for Orm at a moment's notice, but is also quick to point at all of wrongdoings. Luta always wins in arguments with Orm.
Daughter (Alfida)	Liza Arzamasova	Wendee Lee	A true pirate. Alfida is strong, authoritative, and determined-but she has a kind heart, and an acute sense of justice.
Shopkeeper	Olga Shorokhova	Wendee Lee	
Flower Lady	Lyudmila Artemyeva	Wendee Lee	
Lapp Woman	Anna Ardova	Wendee Lee	
Housemaster	Dmitry Nagiyev	Kirk Thornton	
Una	Olga Zubkova	Erin Fitzgerald	
Princess	Olga Zubkova	Erin Fitzgerald	
Prince	Mikhail Tikhonov	Christopher Corey Smith	
Master Vegard	Mikhail Tikhonov	Christopher Corey Smith	A mirror craftsman who can construct mirrors that reflect souls. Vegard is the father of Kai and Gerda.

Other English dub voices:

- Doug Erholtz as King, Robbers
- Kirk Thornton as Servant, Red Head, Robbers
- Cindy Robinson as Robber Hag
- Erin Fitzgerald as Mirror, Lake Gao
- Christopher Corey Smith as Robbers

== Concept ==
=== Early history ===
The Danish author Hans Andersen's collection of fairy tales compiled first in Fairy Tales Told for Children. First Collection. First Booklet (1838) has had tremendous influence on Russian culture that spans over two centuries. Russia already had its own Snow Maiden or Snegurochka that is similar to the character the Snow Queen in Andersen's fairy tale. Snegurochka is depicted as the helper to Ded Moroz, the legendary holiday gift-bringer. Today, Andersen's plots are being transmitted into new media such animation, live-action films, computer games and digital spaces.

Critics such as InterMedia have found Andersen's tales befitting in the cultural landscape of Russia because of its "archetypal proximity of the fairy tale of Andersen to the Russian mentality." The eponymous character the Snow Queen was written by Andersen as a ruler of the Laplands that includes the northern regions of Scandinavia, Finland and the Kola Peninsula in Russia.

The fairy tales was interpreted into Russian for the first time by writers and poets Innokentij Annenski, Marina Tsvetaeva, and Boris Pasternak. In 1894, two St. Petersburg publishing houses, almost simultaneously, published Andersen's collected works in new high-quality translations. The first was Illustrated Fairy Tales: The Complete Collection in Six Volumes translated by B. D. Porozovskaya (publishing house F. Pavlenkov) and the four-volume Collected Works translated by A. and P. Hansen (typolithography of S. M. Nikolaev). Hans Christian Andersen writings later influenced the works of Russian authors Dostoevsky and Tolstoy. By the turn of the twentieth century, interest in Scandinavian literature from Sweden, Norway and especially Denmark became part of the cultural interaction of Russia.

In the Soviet Union era, Anna and Peter Hansen's translated version was the most popular, albeit edited and refined to fit the commissar's guidelines that gave a new interpretation to The Snow Queen. The period after the revolution and into the Soviet Union is considered the moment when Andersen become part of the Russian cultural space. Andersen became "our foreign author", as the fairy tales were influential in inspiring playwright Evgeny Schwartz to stage children's play The Snow Queen in 1938. The stage play premiered in Slovakia theaters in 1989. A 1967 live action Russian film The Snow Queen and a 1986 Moscow Studio Ekran musical The Secret of the Snow Queen also was released.

=== Recent history ===
By the second half of the twentieth century the cinematograph began adapting individual stories from Andersen's canon. One of the adaptations was the animated Soyuzmultfilm film The Snow Queen in 1957. In dedication to the 200th anniversary of Hans Christian Andersen during March 2005 at the Maly Theater of Russia, Mr. Lars Vissing, the CEO of the Andersen Foundation noted Hans Christian is very well known in Russia and the attitude towards him is "passionate."

Initially, InlayFilm had at first plans to adapt Peter Pan. However, producers of the project Sergey Rapoport states, "We took this step consciously", reminding themselves The Snow Queen by Andersen is a well known fairy tale by the audiences of Russia and Europe. Inspired by the classic 1957 film as well as the fairy tale, Wizart Animation undertook a new animated version with a completely different animation style. They viewed the fairy tale with the same integrity as Shakespeare's Hamlet and was eager to extrapolate the story line by Andersen to depict previously unrecorded characters.

However, the studio faithfully followed the source material. The characters of the film - the Lapp woman, little robber girl, the prince, and the princess are all derived from Hans Christian Andersen's story. They used 3D stereoscopy animation to revive the fairy tale eventually exhibiting the film, The Snow Queen. The atmosphere of this Snow Queen film is decidedly more comical and was targeted for the family audience. The film was produced at the Voronezh animation studio in 3D for $7 million with over 1,000 special effects. "We have been working at it for three years. The story is classic, although there are new heroes", Dmitry Kchrustaliov reported.

== Production ==
=== Development ===
“[The Snow Queen] has modern dynamics. It will be a big adventure with friendship, love, chases, fights, characters’ evolutions and magic. You will see the change of elements—from winter to summer, from fire to water. Moreover, it is one of the first stories about the Snow Queen where we allocated stories of minor heroes. So you can find new ones and know better the story of the Snow Queen—why she's willing to destroy creation and freeze people's hearts."

— Director Maxim Sveshnikov on the qualities of the film

The concept of an Hans Andersen fairy tale film was sprouted ever since 2007, when Wizart Animation was founded. Until 2012, the studio's parent company was InlayFilm with the main production site of the studio located in Voronezh, and some divisions located in Moscow. However news of a Disney production of the same name initially made the studio prioritize on other projects putting the film in the shelves.

In 2010, the production for The Snow Queen restarted that lasted over 3 years. They were planning to release the film in the New Year at the turn of 2012–2013. The studio started the production noting they reduced its production time while increasing the personnel and technological process.

The studio were honored to work again from the source material of 1957 movie by Lev Atmanov and Andersen's fairy tale. The cartoon was the directorial debut of Maxim Sveshnikov, who previously worked on the scripts of animated films such as Dobrinya and The Dragon. Initially Maxim Sveshnikov was script writer who became more fascinated with the progress of the writing. The writer became convinced the script can be turned into a film that could be entertaining content for the audience. Thereafter the producers agreed to give Sveshnikov the director role. The movie was also co-directed by Vladlen Barbe who has previously adapted Soviet Union's own The Snow Queen animated film in 1991. The Disney co-production narrated by Sigourney Weaver was part of the Stories to Remember series of children's animated films.

The exclusive first poster of the film released on 12 June 2011 by lnlayFilm featuring the eponymous character Gerda ready to summit the spiral palace of the Snow Queen in Spitsbergen.

Producer Timur Bekmambetov of the Bazelevs Company along with InlayFilm agreed to produce the film. Bekmambetov's animation credits includes 9. Bazelev Company's experience in producing commercial features enabled the film to enter on a worldwide scale. Bekmambetov said, "As to The Snow Queen when we first saw the project we immediately felt its great potential and decided to step in as co-producers." Aleksey Tsitsilin was cinematographer. The Snow Queen completed production on 22 October 2012. The date coincided with the anniversary date of 22 October 1957, the day The Snow Queen by Lev Atamanov was released in the Soviet Union.

Russian artists Nyusha voiced the heroine Gerda, and Ivan Okhlobystin (Interns) voiced the troll Orm. Troll Orm fit the voice of Okhlobystin perfectly who was invited to the voice studio without any finalized conclusions beforehand. Supporting ensemble voice cast included Galina Tyunina (ru) as Snow Queen, Ramilya Iskander (ru) as Kai, Erin Fitzgerald as Luta, Dmitry Nagiyev as Housemaster, Yuri Stoyano as King, Olga Shorokhova as shopkeeper, Lyudmila Artemyeva (ru) as Flower Lady, Mikhail Tikhonov as Prince, Olga Zubkova (ru) as Una, Anna Ardova (ru) as Lapp woman and Liza Arzamasova as Alfida.

There was no blind audition except that which was used for a few actors. Instead the quality of work determined the casting. Ivan Okhlobystin fit the character Orm who gave "so much energy, humor, and some sparkling acting impromptu." Lyudmila Artemyeva who voiced the flower girl was well received by the public as well by Artemyeva herself who stated, "How did I do that? This is probably my brightest role." Dmitry Nagiyev as Housemaster gave a short cameo. Nyusha gave the role of Gerda as noted by the creators of the film a "bundle of energy and lively reactions." The voice cast by Galina Tyunina for the Snow Queen "is incomparable! Her words are bone-chilling!" according to the creators of the film. A review noted the high quality Russian language voice cast.

The English cast was picked by René Veilleux. Jessica Straus who has over 200 credits in games, animation, and anime voiced Gerda. Doug Erholtz was picked as Orm, Cindy Robinson as Snow Queen, Marin Miller as Kai and Dee Bradley Baker as Luta. On 20 November 2013, the PRL Studio In Poland, recorded a dubbing for the film. Alfida the pirate was voiced by Małgorzata Socha, Maciek Rock as Prince, and Arkadiusz Jakubik as troll Orm. For the Latvian cast, actresses who took part in production included Laila Kirmuška (lv) while the Snow Queen was spoken by Riga Theatre actress Sandra Zvīgule (lv). Latvian actors included Gints Grāvelis (lv) and Uldis Anže (lv).

The cast for the Korean release included actress Park Bo Young as Gerda and comedian Lee Soo-geun as troll Orm. According to Zum of Korea, Park Bo-Young "brought the character's charm to life with a lovely voice" while Lee Soo-geun "overpowered the atmosphere with his distinctively jovial voice" for troll Orm. Mother of actor Cha Tae-hyun, Choe Soo-min, voiced the Snow Queen, while Jang Gwang, a voice actor played the King and Housemaster. The movie was one of the most anticipated projects to come out of Russia in 2012.

=== Adaptation from source material ===
The Sveshnikov brothers script writers mostly followed the abridged Soviet Union fairy tale of The Snow Queen used by many other directors such as Soyuzmultfilm animator Atamanov and playwright Schwartz. Maxim Sveshnikov was very emotional when he saw the Soyuzmultfilm film for the first time. He tried to convey the same emotional qualities to the script of the 2012 film. The research for the script included the animated, live-action features, and TV series of The Snow Queen brand. However, the script tried to be a unique dynamic take from the rest of the stories.

Sveshnikov explains, "We tried to keep the spirit of the fairy tale, the spirit of family values by Andersen." However, to relate the Soviet classic to modern audience, the team used a combination of modern technology with traditional animation to evoke the "magic atmosphere" of the original to create a new adaptation. From the script perspective, the writers who couldn't completely follow the 1957 film or Andersen's fairy tale because both had religious undertones and was decidedly targeted for an historical era.

The writers read both the original Andersen's translation considered the "adult" version and post-Soviet Union version considered the "nursery" version. The script integrated the narration portion from the nursery version and the mirror of the trolls and the trolls themselves from the "adult" version. Together with additional input in comedic schemes they were able to achieve an educational content material.

The project is dedicated to the family and is a family film. The audience of the film is as stated by the creators of the film: "Of course, first of all for their loved ones, for parents and relatives who live all over the world, for the family you love. It's so nice to get feedback from them, these are the simple things that bring joy and give energy for further work."

By the final edit of the script, many events had to be refined. Gerda and Kai become sister and brother rather than neighbors. The robbers from Andersen's story become pirates for the film. The script did keep the concept of the magic mirror intact. However the mirror of the devil that reflects evil from Andersen's fairy tale was completely changed to the magic mirror of Master Vegard that reflects souls. The difference was added to highlight the conflict between the characters of Master Vegard who is described as an artisan wizard and The Snow Queen. Another difference from the source material is the character troll will kidnap Kai, instead of the character the Snow Queen. The concept of a wind that seeks its enemies called the North Wind became one of the main antagonists of the story. Gerda is characterized as a spirited, pugnacious girl who fights for justice in contrast to the moral, upright Gerda found in Andersen's fairy tale. Kai the brother from the fairy tale is depicted as a talented artist in the film.

The script tried to concretize the character Snow Queen with the characterization meant to convey a universal antagonist appeal that explains to the audience why "her heart is so cold." However, they added time loop flashback sequence for the character that will define the benevolent beginnings of the Snow Queen as Little Irma. A review stated, "The creators do not adhere to Andersen slavishly, but remain faithful to him at least in the basics."

The director also remarked, the film will elaborate on rarely explored elements of the 19th century fairy tale that previous film adaptations missed. A classic example of renewing forgotten characters is the troll Orm, who was forgotten by the directors of many previous TV and film versions of the winter tale, and yet Andersen had it. According to Reuters, the erstwhile troll from Andersen's tale depicted as an arch villain and an associate to the Snow Queen with dark undertones was completely converted into a harmless creature. Just like animated films, the troll became a comedic relief character as well as the accompanying character, weasel Luta.

=== Themes ===
The film's motto was, "Cold can freeze your heart, love can set you free." The concept of love and empathy is encompassed in the motif object, the mirror of Master Vegard. The character Snow Queen's demands to track down Gerda and the children of the Master through a secondary character troll Orm disguised as a black ferret contributes to new themes of illusion and friend or foe concept. The themes of family values, friendship and selflessness is explored through the character Gerda's quest. The film explores the effects of deception, lies, betrayal and cynicism. The concept of the character Gerda's willpower to combat the society of the Snow Queen and help save the world from the prejudice against artists echoes the theme of tolerance and the role that books and literature play in a free and informed society.

The film evokes the stories of Charles Dickens such as Oliver Twist, as orphanage street children confront the Snow Queen at the ice palace that also evokes rags-to-riches, underdog theme. The theme of self-belief is used to explore the actions of Gerda that helps her gain inner strength, fight evil and win. The theme is primarily described in Gerda's confrontation with the Snow Queen. Gerda and Kai living as orphans was a completely new take from Andersen's tale, yet the idea parallels Andersen's own lifetime. Andersen who was the son of a shoemaker was born to a poor family. He was orphaned at an early age. Nevertheless, Andersen had keen insight in literature that was developed to create critically acclaimed works in genres of fairy tales.

The fundamental theme of childish innocence is explicated in the film. The flashback of the Snow Queen as the character Irma allowed the audience to see the symbolic growth of Gerda as a human being in her Arctic pilgrimage as opposed to the de-growth of the Snow Queen back to her child form in the finale. The climax is intended to explain the qualities of a good heart and the beneficial effects of being children.

=== Animation ===
Concept art for the film before final rendering

One of the animation directors of the film was Alexander Dorogov. Acclaimed artist Artur Mirzoyan was also part of the team. Wizart Animation's main advantages is its work on 3D stereoscopy. For a report by Rossiyskaya Gazeta, the animation studio in the city center is described like a fairy tale with an elevator traveling into the creative departments. Yuri Moskvin noted that the studio innovated in many animation methods despite the context they were living in. Russian CG industry was still developing at that time. The workforce was built from the grounds up as there was no animation school to recruit new animators. The film presented challenges because it had the most effects done in a Russian CG film during that time period. Vladimir Nikolaev noted the film is not pseudo-3D, but produced simultaneously in real-time multiple camera shots. For every 12 seconds there is a special effect. An in-house research and development team helped the studio's Maya-based tool set. The most difficult part of the animation was the editing and deciding what take that will go into animation.

Animators were present in many departments including backgrounds, textures, cloth movement dynamics. Animation technology included operating, lighting and sound engineering. The animator's novelties included fish frozen in icebergs, robbers from Andersen's fairy tale turning to pirates living on an icebreaker brig and the intricate details of the items at the merchant shop.

=== Soundtrack ===
Mark Willott, an Emmy winning composer from UK joined with Wizart Animation to compose the soundtrack for the film. The theme song "We Will Never be Apart" is sung in English in the closing credits of the film with vocals by Phil Gwynne. The official soundtrack was heard in trailers 1 and 3. A Russian music video for the film was made and performed by singer Nyusha that was titled "This is New Year."

Latvian band Brainstorm performed the main track called "Shine Clear" that became the theme song in the animated film. The song was composed with animation and was played at the finale of the film. The verses were written by Riga poet Sergey Timofeev (ru). Their song got translated into English titled "Flashlight" sung by Scottish band Travis with lead voice by Fran Healy. The song premiered internationally. Henry Huo performed the title track for the film in China.

== Release ==
=== Theatrical ===
==== Domestic ====
The first trailer was released on 27 June 2011, the second trailer on 3 February 2012, the third trailer on 27 February 2012, and the fourth and official trailer on 25 October 2012. The Russian promotional trailer was released on 7 December 2012. The official poster was presented in October 2012. The official English trailer was released on Deadline Hollywood and YouTube.

The Snow Queen was first presented for international buyers at the AFM (American Film Market) in November 2011. Olga Sinelshchikova, Business Development Director, explained, "At the AFM, we received very positive feedback from buyers from over 20 territories, including USA, Canada, Germany, Italy, South Korea and China, among others. Due to this fact, we decided to produce a version for international distribution, so this past January we successfully completed the English dubbing with Los Angeles-based production company Verité Films. The dubbing was recorded at Salami Studios with established, veteran animation actors – Cindy Robinson, Doug Erholtz, Kirk Thornton, and Wendee Lee – who have more than 200 animated projects in their portfolio. The Snow Queen is now more than ever an international project." The AFM screening, which took place on 1 November, at 9 am at the AMC Theater on the Third Street Promenade in Santa Monica, California, was the first time that buyers got a chance to see the complete film. On 15 October 2012, excerpts from the film was screened at a new program in Moscow called Red Square Screenings.

On 27 November 2012 at the 89th Russian International Film Market, The Snow Queen was presented. Timur Bekmambetov and Ivan Okhlobystin held a press conference at the Moscow Film Market on 13 December 2012. On 24 December 2012 in Voronezh, Russia, Ivan Okhlobystin and other actors presented a special premiere of The Snow Queen in 3D at the cinema, Spartak. In December, The Committee of Culture and the Trade Union and the Committee of the State Duma organized its first 3D picture show for children at the Duma assembly in Russia. A significant advertising campaign was launched before the film premiered. There was advertising for outdoors, TV and radio. A pre-premiere screening was held at the RIA Novosti Moscow press center. The film had a wide release in Russia on 31 December 2012. Cobaka enlisted the film as one of the highlights of the New Year rentals.

==== Film festivals ====
The Snow Queen had a 2013 presentation at the Berlin International Film Festival. There the film received appraisals from Brazil, South Korea, Israel, Indonesia, and the Middle East for distribution. Rights to the film was gone to CCS Media for South Korea, MT Entertainment for Indonesia, PlayArte (pt) for Brazil, Film House for Israel, Shooting Stars for the Middle East, Big Sales for Baltic states and Aurora Distribution for Ukraine.

The film found appeal to distributors at the 67th Cannes International Film Festival in France. On 25 April 2013, Cartoon Brew has announced that it will be presented at the Annecy International Animated Film Festival in June 2013. On 22 May 2013 at the Cannes Film Festival, it was confirmed that Vertical Entertainment will provide the U.S. distribution. It competed at the IX International Animated Films Festival in Varna, Bulgaria. The film participated at the Czech Republic Zlín Film Festival.

The Snow Queen was one of the animated features selected to be screened at the Tromsø Children's Film Festival in May 2013 hosted by Norway. Wizart Animation presented the film in Denmark, the homeland of Andersen, at the Buster Copenhagen International Film Festival for Children & Youth. The forum started on 5 September 2015. Originally, there was only one screening, but the organizers had to add four more sessions as the Danes showed renewed interest. It was presented at the Asia Pacific Film Festival in November 2013. In September 2013, it was presented at the Gijón International Film Festival in Spain. In December 2013 the film was nominated for best animated feature film at the Fairy Tale Film Festival in Moscow competing alongside Frozen. The film later won the Grand Prix prize of the section.

==== Worldwide release ====
A special pre-release was arranged in Riga, Latvia on 27 December 2012. In Korea, it was released on 7 February 2013. In Lithuania, it was released on 22 February 2013. On the same day, distributor company PlayArte (pt) released the film in Brazil in over 200 screens. In Israel, it was released on 7 March 2013. In Indonesia, it was released on 13 March 2013. In France, it was released on the fall of 2013 under Universal Studios. In Poland, it was released on 26 December 2013. Due to rules of the cinema industry and the context of the time period of 2013, in the United States the film did not have the chance to release in theaters. However it managed to release in video on demand on 11 October 2013 and in DVD on 28 January 2014.

After its 2012 premier, The Snow Queen continued to open to new territories. The film premiered theatrically or on home entertainment in seventeen countries till the end of 2015, that include Canada, South Africa, Belgium, and Luxembourg. The Snow Queen became the first Russian animated film to get a wide release in China. It released to 3,400 screens on 31 July 2015. On 30 October 2015, The Snow Queen released in South Africa. For the first time in the history of Russian animation, a project was voiced in Afrikaans. Composer band Brainstorm's Flashlight theme song for the film was localized in Afrikaans. Local star cast for South Africa included South African actress Heidi Mollentze.

=== Home media ===
The Snow Queen, was released on DVD, Blu-ray and Real 3D Blu-ray in Russia by musical company Misteriya Zvuka on 31 January 2013. It was released on VOD on Thursday, 10 October 2013. The film was released on DVD in the United States on 28 January 2014 by Universal Pictures Home Entertainment. Worldwide, over 100,000 DVDs and Blu-rays have been sold as of January 2014.

On 23 December 2019, the film was second in audience rankings as it aired in France 2. Three million viewers or 14.6% of the prime-time viewers saw the film.

== Reception ==
=== Box office ===
On 6 January 2013, The Snow Queen at the Russian box office made only $5.16 million in the first week. But on 31 January 2013, it was considered a box office success as it had drawn 1.3 million viewers. On 1 February 2013, it grossed $8.8 million. Preliminary results of the New Year holiday box office collections in Russia which was the highest from any of the previous years showed The Snow Queen at seventh place. Only The Three Bogatyrs on Distant Shores was the other animation movie to top the list at second place before The Hobbit. The results of a record year in 2012 for animated films in Russia was noted by a review as an "indicator of the recovery of society. The increased attendance of cartoons in cinemas means that Russians are choosing family holidays and that they have more and more children to spend time with."

In total, the film collected 233 million rubles (~$7.7 million) in Russia. On 7 February 2013, the film released in South Korea. According to the results of the first weekend in Korea, the cartoon took the fifth place in the local rating of collections, earning $540 thousand on 311 screens and even managed to surpass the results of the Pixar cartoon Monsters University ($337 thousand on 173 screens). On 15 February 2013 in Korea, it grossed $1.5 million at the box office. The film also grossed $1 million in Brazil. As of November 2013, the total box office ratio was 78.87% for Russia and the rest of the countries – 21.13%. In total, The Snow Queen made $14 million at the box office. The profit was twice the budget.

=== Critical response ===
The film received negative reviews abroad, holding an approval rating of 0% on review aggregator website Rotten Tomatoes, based on 8 reviews, and an average rating of 3.9/10. JM Willis reviewed that he liked the characters in The Snow Queen: "The animation, story and score is enough to help this film stand on its own." A review from The Village Voice said, "A Russian animated adaptation of Hans Christian Andersen's fairy tale, Snow Queen proves both visually cruddy and narratively muddled."

Mike McGranaghan for The Aisle Seat commented that "there's nothing inherently wrong with Snow Queen. It's a pleasant enough movie with some nice visuals... That said, the problem faced by the movie is that, while it's not bad, it's also simply not good enough." In particular the review took issue with the plot structure stating "the story is kind of disjointed... These moments feel more like a set of ideas than an actual plot, however. Never are they substantially integrated into the main idea of the movie", concluding finally that "Compared to [big name American animated films], Snow Queen is an also-ran."

A RogerEbert review stated: "The message gets muddled with plot strands going every which way, though the real culprit is some awkward animation." Review at Movie Mom stated the film was lackluster by stating, "The vocal performances are uninspired and uninvolving. And the one effect that works, a 360 degree swoop-around, is relentlessly overused. The script is muddled and dull." Common Sense Media stated, "As for the story's plotline, it's a bit muddled and confusing, but at least Gerda the protagonist is sweet -- if not very confident. Gerda's desire to save her brother Kay is the movie's biggest redeeming factor."

Jennie Kermode for Eye for Film complimented the film's appropriateness for children, remarking that the film's "esoteric scenarios may not make much sense to adults but they're conveyed with a sincerity that kids will find appealing." Oscar award expert for The Hollywood Reporter shortlisted the film for the best Oscars animated feature.

Brazilian review by Alisson Oliveira from Reuters, noted the film starkly contrasts from past Snow Queen adaptations by stating: "Unlike the animations of recent times The Frozen Kingdom is not a comedy, but an adventure in a fable tone." A Lithuanian review from Alfa.lt remarked at the exhibition of the female characters. A German review from Kinderfilmwelt states "if you feel like an entertaining adventure and want to put yourself in a pleasant winter mood with great, snowy landscapes and lots of sleet, this is the right place!"

Polish review Kultura Poznan by Sylwia Klimek was surprised by how Wizart Animation adapted Andersen's fairy tale: "It turns out that Andersen - without profanities - can be shown in 3D." The review compared the film to a video game: "It's a modern, three-dimensional, glamorous film. Using the latest advances in technique, and from Andersen's fairy tales, drawing only those passages that allow the whole resource to be made interesting. It is like a good computer game: dynamic three-dimensional images, interesting graphical solutions, saturated colors, expressive characters." The audience reaction for the Polish review was positive as the children's themselves are jubilant after the ending: "And after the screening, they clap loudly. It's quite a challenge to create an animation today that children will react to that way."

However, Nikita Krasnoglazov of Vesti Segodnya with a rating of four stars did not think the film was a game but instead a poetic "synthesis of genres." The three year work put into this exhibition drew from many facets of film making including the voice cast, the poetic verses of the song and the special effects of the animation. The Snow Queen received 85% of positive reviews from critics, adults and children in Russia. Maria Tereshchenko review for Kino Teatr commented, "The winter world through which Gerda and the Troll travel is absolutely fascinating with its computer-generated glamorous beauty (however, small islands of summer are also good, for example, in the magic garden), the interiors are pleasing to the eye, the Queen's palace with strange ice goblins is perfectly invented." Lora Mjolsness of KinoKultura Russian cinema reviews stated: "The new film also supports the original tale's message about the strength of a child, albeit in a different way. In The Snow Queen Gerda is certainly able to stand up for herself, yet her personality is different. Her power is based on physical force, on her wit, and on her determination. Her heart is not as innocent and she appears older and more street wise on her quest." An Annecy review gave the film four stars. The review as well as a review from Spain remarked the production is reminiscent of the golden age of Russian animation:

"Visually, despite a texture of characters it is not really successful and 3D not always completed. The set is still very beautiful for a Russian production. Ambition is present both in the setting and in the realization. However, the ambition of a country with few animation productions is to be welcomed despite a time of fame in the 50s and 60s."

=== Accolades ===
Award	Date of ceremony	Category	Recipient(s)	Result	Ref(s)
Suzdalfest	23 February 2013	Full-Meter Animated Feature Film	The Snow Queen	Nominated	(Note: For the first time in the history of the Open Russian Festival of Animated Film also known as Suzdalfest, the animation category was split into "Full-Meter" section denoting a rise in film submissions despite only five nominations in contention that included The Snow Queen.)
International Animated Film Festival WFAF (Varna)	11 September 2013	Feature Film	The Snow Queen	Nominated	
Gijón International Film Festival	18 September 2013	Enfants Terribles	The Snow Queen	Nominated	
Moscow Film Festival (Grand Prix)	2013	Animated Feature Film	The Snow Queen	Won	
Zelenograd International Youth Film Festival (Reflection)	11 October 2013	Animated Film	Vladlen Barbe; Maxim Sveshnikov	Won	
Fairy Tale Film Festival (Grand Prix)	8 December 2013	Animated Feature Film	The Snow Queen	Won	
International Festival of Arts of the Silk Road Countries (Xin Guang Award)	27 September 2016	Original Animation	The Snow Queen	Won	
Multimir	2018	Best Licensed Product Based On Russian Animation	The Snow Queen	Won	

=== Comparison between Wizart's The Snow Queen and Disney's Frozen ===
==== Reviews ====
There was increased attention from the media both domestically and internationally for a potential clash in the box office between Walt Disney Animation Studios feature Frozen and The Snow Queen due to the fact that both are remakes of Andersen's classic 19th century fairy tale The Snow Queen and the films were ready for debut around 2012/2013. Initially, Wizart's project was delayed. Sergei Rapoport the producer for the film recalled, "At a time we were developing several projects that could be launched at once. We had information that Disney was planning to start working on its The Snow Queen. Then this project was frozen." However, InlayFilm, the co-producer studio for the film had the ambitions to restart the animation in the summer of 2010.

Wizart's The Snow Queen was released on 31 December 2012. Disney's Frozen was released on 19 November 2013. The Snow Queen released to theaters in 2012, one year earlier than Frozen. When Disney revealed their film will be titled Frozen, the prospects for an international release were lowered. However, according to representatives of Bazelevs, the film was received with open negotiations by international distributors.

After theatrical release, many reviewers also drew comparisons between it and Frozen, with one commentator for IndieWire remarking "The cold war with Russia is back - but this time it's over our Frozen flick versus their Frozen flick." Bleeding Cool stated, "Before Disney's Frozen, A Russian Snow Queen." The marketing for the film revealed The Snow Queen was a possible inspiration for Disney's Frozen as it stated, "Discover the magical story which inspired 'Frozen'." Film Press review from Slovakia initially thought, "Surely the Russians have imitated Disney's Ice Kingdom." However, upon further analysis, "the reality is different, almost the opposite: the digitally animated long-form film, inspired by the fairy tale of Hans Christian Andersen, began shooting in Russia in 2009, and premiered three years later." On 24 December 2019, French television news website Toutelatele evaluated the box office of the two films in the year of 2013. Initially The Snow Queen had numerous small screen broadcasts, but quickly moved to video-on-demand. Frozen "stifled the Russian version" at the French box office.

Reviews by Annecy and others have emphasized The Snow Queen is genuine and has no connection with the creative process of Frozen. In an interview, Yuri Moskvin, the producer for The Snow Queen stated when the studio knew about the Frozen, they did not stop production, because coincidentally, both studios revived their projects in 2012. The producer claimed they are completely different films, with different budgets and experiences of creation.

Critics praised The Snow Queen for its faithful plot with quality animation despite a small budget. The Snow Queen was produced for around seven million dollars, or around 1/25 the cost of Frozen. Cartoon Brew as well as The National from UAE stated The Snow Queen is a candid depiction of Andersen's fairy tale.

== Legacy ==
=== Sequels ===
The film has been able to be seen in over 75 countries in its final global distribution. Komsomolskaya Pravda put the film into the top seven holiday cartoons to watch. The favorable outcomes of the film can be attributed to its low maintenance cost as well as the enthusiasm from the creators and animators of the film. In 2019, the legacy of The Snow Queen continued as Voronezh, the animation studio's native hometown will decorate outdoor venues with keynote art objects originating from the film. The keynote art object will be "Kai and Gerda" proposed for the new square "Energy."

The concept of a theatrical sequel titled The Snow Queen 2: The Snow King was set for release in 2014. The sequel tells about how Kai and Gerda help Orm the troll save his people from the Snow King. The voice cast for Snow Queen 2 included Sean Bean as General Arrog, Sharlto Copley, as troll Orm, Bella Thorne as Gerda, and Isabelle Fuhrman as Alfida. It grossed $15.5 million at the box office.

A third installment, titled The Snow Queen 3: Fire and Ice, was released on 29 December 2016. The film met with critical and commercial success. The film set a record for Russian animated ventures abroad and has since inspired a fourth installment, titled The Snow Queen: Mirrorlands released on 1 January 2019 in Russia. The film was noteworthy for its acceptance in film festivals as well as international collaboration. Today, The Snow Queen animated tetralogy series has managed to be released to over 150 countries and has been translated into 30 languages.

== See also ==
- The Snow Queen (1957)
- Frozen (2013 film)
