= The Snow Queen 2 =

- Theatrical release poster
- Directed by: Aleksey Tsitsilin
- Written by: Aleksey Tsitsilin; Vladimir Nikolayev; Roman Nepomnyashchiy; Alexey Zamyslov
- Produced by: Timur Bekmambetov; Yuri Moskvin; Vladimir Nikolayev; Diana Yurinova
- Starring: Ivan Okhlobystin; Garik Kharlamov; Nyusha; Valeryia Nikolaeva; Fyodor Dobronravov; Olga Zubkova; Mikhail Tikhonov; Galina Tyunina; Anna Khilkevich; Ramilya Iskander
- Edited by: Aleksey Tsitsilin
- Music by: Mark Willott
- Production companies: Wizart Animation; Bazelevs Company
- Distributed by: Bazelevs Distribution
- Release dates: 12 December 2014 (United Kingdom); 1 January 2015 (Russia)
- Running time: 76 minutes
- Country: Russia
- Language: Russian
- Budget: $6.5 million
- Box office: $15.6 million

The Snow Queen 2 (Russian: Снежная королева 2: Перезаморозка, romanized: Snezhnaya koroleva 2: Perezamorozka, lit. 'The Snow Queen 2: Re-Freezing'), is a 2014 Russian animated fantasy comedy film directed by Aleksey Tsitsilin. It is the sequel to The Snow Queen (2012). The film follows the story of troll Orm who gets mired again in lies and financial irresponsibility after he sees a reflection while working as a miner. The vainglorious troll Orm gets a chance to become a hero again when the Troll King Arrog proclaims the decree that whoever rescues his royal family trapped at the palace of the Snow Queen will receive a grand prize.

Development began in 2014, as the writers signed up for a sequel in response to the rousing reception of The Snow Queen. The animation focused on improving the animation quality of the film from its predecessor.

The Snow Queen 2 was released theatrically in Russia on 1 January 2015, with an international pre-release during November and December 2014 in the United States and the United Kingdom. It became the first Russian film to top weekend box office in a European country. The film was noted for its good humor, bright characters, and epic battles.

A sequel, The Snow Queen 3: Fire and Ice, was released in 2016.

== Plot ==
A year after the Snow Queen was defeated by Gerda, Orm the anteater-like troll has thawed out the rest of his kind and now lives with his grandmother Rosa and Gerda's pet white ferret Luta, works in the troll village as a miner. Orm takes an oath at Lake Gao never to tell another lie and from that moment his reflection comes to life and starts manipulating him into doing the wrong things, including lying.

Upon being fired from his job after insulting the knight Arrog and facing eviction from his cottage, Orm is manipulated by his reflection into donning armor so he can take part in a competition to decide who will marry Princess Maribel. In order to impress the Princess and her uncle, the King, Orm lies about defeating the Snow Queen. However, Gerda, who had arrived at the village with her brother Kai and friend Alfida, overhear Orm's lies, leading to an argument between the two that culminates in Gerda leaving.

Later, as Orm and Rosa are moving into the King's palace, the King says he feels as if he has seen Rosa before, to which she asks if she has changed that much over the years. Suddenly the North Wind appears and abducts Princess Maribel, causing the King to decree that whoever rescues her will marry her. Orm, joined by Arrog and the other warriors, set off to rescue the Princess, but Orm reluctantly abandons the others and arrives at Gerda's village, only to discover that her mirror has been stolen. Orm then sends Gerda a message asking her to meet him at the Black Cliffs. En route, Gerda, Kai and Alfida meet the trolls, who reveal that Orm had abandoned the troop. Gerda, disillusioned with Orm, sails off with the others, tearfully abandoning Orm at the cliffs.

A distraught Orm is manipulated by his, now blue and frosty, reflection into pulling him into the real world, upon which he freezes the ocean, trapping Gerda and the others. After a confrontation between the two, Orm's reflection, referring to himself as the 'Snow King', reveals that the more he grows in power, the more Orm weakens and becomes invisible. The Snow King then unleashes his army and overwhelms Orm's friends, encasing them all in ice. Orm tries to warn Gerda but she can't see, hear or touch him and the Snow King tricks her into thinking he is the real Orm and freezes her, and Luta, then traps Orm in the mirror realm. Orm, while trapped, realizes that the Snow King was born from his lies, and manages to free himself by loudly confessing to his lies, thawing out Gerda and the Snow King's other victims, while at the same time reverting the Snow King back to his normal reflection.

In the end, Orm is taken back to the troll village but instead of being punished he is hailed a hero. Rosa marries the King, and Orm gets his cottage back and rekindles his friendship with Gerda. Arrog marries the Princess and have children, as seen during the end credits.

== Cast ==
| Character | Russian Actor | English Actor |
|---|---|---|
| Orm, Snow King | Ivan Okhlobystin | Sharlto Copley |
| Arrog | Garik Kharlamov | Sean Bean |
| Gerda | Nyusha | Bella Thorne |
| Alfida | Valeriya Nikolayeva | Isabelle Fuhrman |
| Luta | Dee Bradley Baker | Dee Bradley Baker |
| Rahat | Shura Bi-2 | Pat Fraley |
| Troll King | Fyodor Dobronravov | Jeff Bennett |
| Grandma | Olga Zubkova | Candi Milo |
| Boss | Mikhail Tikhonov | James Connor |
| Guards | Aleksey Likhnitskiy; Roman Yunusov | JB Blanc; Nick Tate |
| Snow Queen | Galina Tyunina | Cindy Robinson |
| Maribel | Anna Khilkevich | Sara Cravens |
| Young Orm | Olga Shorokhova | Tyler Merna |
| Eric | Diomid Vinogradov | Larry Cedar |
| Lokum | Lyova Bi-2 | Bill Chott |
| Kai | Ramilya Iskander | Miles Hoff |

== Production ==
=== Development ===
"The Snow Queen" was originally conceived as an international project with the appropriate high level of animation and the more satisfying is the high demand, which we celebrate at the largest film markets around the world. Like the original fairy tale by Andersen which served as the starting point for our film, its story is universal and is understandable to audiences all around the globe.

— Timur Bekmambetov

After The Snow Queen, the producers and the creative team of Wizart Animation decided to continue the story. The breakthrough moment of the original film persuaded the writers to start writing the sequel. The Russian 3D CG sequel was produced by Timur Bekmambetov. The director's chair in the new project was taken by Aleksey Tsitsilin, who worked as the director of photography in the first installment. The scriptwriters continued the themes of the first film. They were inspired by the classic fairy tale by Hans Christian Andersen and focused on presenting a captivating follow-up plot to the original film. Aleksey Tsitsilin, producer Vladimir Nikolaev, art director Alexey Zamyslov with participation of Timur Bekmambetov and Roman Nepomnyashchiy wrote the script for the sequel. Diana Yurinova, Wizart Animation's international distribution manager as well as producer sold the film to international markets in China. The film was signed into contract for distribution across many countries at the Cannes film festival in 2014 while its peer Frozen film was breaking box office records.

The film took an innovative turn from the prequel by emphasizing the character development of the character Orm the troll instead of the character Gerda. After the release of the first film, the audience was amazed by the character troll Orm. Taking the audience consensus into account, the sequel developed the side-character to new levels. Previously the character Orm was depicted as the creator of a magic mirror. In this film, the scriptwriters presented Orm as a main character who must pay off the debts such as foreclosure and mortgages. However an opportunity to save Princess Maribel causes the troll to commit deceptions leading to the development of themes of corruption and the consequences of telling lies. The writers instilled elements of tragedy without losing the plot's comedy framework.

The writers used an orb as the motif object that drives forward the plot's conflict. The use of the orb's reflection and its subsequent mysterious whispering in Orm's imagination depict the effects of alter ego which was chosen as an allegory to Plato's Ring of Gyges or Tolkien's One Ring. A review from Russia found the film has parallels to The Lord of the Rings. The similarity occurs when characters Gerda and Orm finally reach the palace of the Snow Queen that is similar in story line to the character Frodo seeking to overcome his identity crisis by journeying to the volcano at Mordor in The Lord of the Rings. The themes of truth and friendship are highlighted in the film that will serve as a factor in regaining character Orm's consciousness. The film also was inspired by the victory of the Russian Olympic bobsleigh team at the 2014 Sochi Winter Olympics.

The Russian cast included Ivan Okhlobystin who voiced Orm and Snow King. Russian singer Nyusha (Anna Shurochkina) voiced Gerda. Pirate girl Alfida was based on Andersen's nameless little Robber Girl. Wizart opened a competition to all Russian residents for a chance to be cast as the voice actor for the character Alfida. Out of the 150 contestant submissions, St. Petersburg accountant - Valeria Nikolaeva was chosen as the voice cast for Alfida. Actor Garik Kharlamov (ru) voiced the Troll King Arrog.

Popular Brazilian actors Larissa Manoela (Carrossel) voiced Gerda and João Côrtes voiced Orm. Portuguese voice artists include singer Ana Malhoa, TV host and actor Júlio Isidro, and actress and mother of Cristiano Ronaldo - Dolores Aveiro.

Work on the second feature progressed at an international level. Ned Lott was announced as voice director and casting who has animation credits including Zambezia, Khumba, and the English version of Ernest and Celestine. At the Toronto International Film Festival, the voice cast was announced for the English version of the film. International stars took part in the dubbing including Sean Bean (The Lord of the Rings) as Arrog, Sharlto Copley (District 9) as Orm, Bella Thorne (Blended) as Gerda, and Isabelle Fuhrman (Hunger Games) as Alfida.

On 5 November 2014, Wizart presented the English-version of the film at the American Film Market. Promotional activities in Russia started on 6 December 2014 as the Snow Queen, an ice rink inspired by the film opened near Triumphal Arch of Moscow. Singer Peter Nalitch and the band Nogu Svelo! performed at the opening.

=== Animation ===
The main characters become even more realistic in animation than they were in the prequel. The wool dynamics is utilized by physics, converging animation to science. Vladimir Nikolaev, producer for the film states, "All our wool is dynamic, that is, it is crushed by clothes, it is crushed by fabrics. It interacts with all objects that the trolls touch, that is, this is all honest physics - this is not animation." The character "North Wind" consists of nearly 80 million particle pixels. The most complex scene was animating the fish that splashed out of the waterfall. With over 25 layers of effects, the tests and production of that scene took three weeks. For all the materials and calculation of special effects, a server of 200 terabytes was needed. It would have taken 997 years to produce this cartoon if it had been produced on a single computer.

In the second installment, new animation innovations were introduced that weren't present in the prequel. The characters have the new opportunity to raise their eyebrows; to move in different flexible ways allowing them to express a new set of emotions. The film also feature more special effects as evident in the polar battles with a Troll army. The animators refined lighting and shooting systems that added a subtle layer to the film.

Director Aleksey Tsitsilin remarked the film script was a product and contribution by the residents of Voronezh, the city in south Russia where Wizart Animation is located. Even some of the settings like the tall clock tower is inspired by the southern railway at Voronezh. In terms of character design, drawing the protagonists required a concerted effort from the animators more so than drawing the antagonists. There were over hundred modifications before reaching a final picture. The process of English-language voice-over caused some of the humor to be misinterpreted. The Valley of the Trolls was inspired by the water channels featured in a map of Venice. The Troll king's palace was built in the style of Italian architecture. The cast recording was done at the studio in Moscow.

=== Soundtrack ===
Mark Willott composed the original score and songs of the film. British band Butterfly Stone provided vocals for the theme song "Find Yourself." The soundtrack includes two songs performed by the Belarusian-Russian band Bi-2 who also were voice cast for the characters Rahat and Lokum. Bella Thorne who voiced Gerda performed the main song “Diamond." Chosun Entertainment says the song is "cheerful and addictive melody." A localized version of the song was also released in Bulgaria performed by Eurovision nominee Yoanna Dragneva (bg).

The Korean girl band SISTAR gave voice to the main theme song rendered for the South Korean audience. Starship Entertainment employed singers Soyou to create the album: Diamond (The Snow Queen 2 OST). The Korean boy band Boyfriend gave voice to the main theme song "Find Yourself." Chilean actress and singer, Denise Rosenthal also provided voice to the theme song. The music is featured as OST Snow Queen 2/La Reina de las Nieves. The official soundtrack “Maak My Dag” for the African release was performed by Ghoema Music Awards singer Leah from South Africa. The film also included the Russian patriotic march Farewell of Slavianka in its soundtrack.

== Release ==
=== Theatrical ===
A pre-release in UK, US and South Korea was followed by the main premiere in Russia. The UK premiere of The Snow Queen 2: Magic of the Ice Mirror was released on 25 October 2014 at Vue Cinemas. The US release was in Los Angeles on 6 November 2014. A few days later, the Golden Globe Award of the Association of Foreign Journalists nominated the film for the Golden Globe Awards. The South Korean release was in December 2014 distributed by Cinema Republic. On 26 December 2014, the Lithuanian premiere started.

In the turn of the New Year 2015, the film was released throughout Russia. The film was simultaneously seen by residents of the CIS countries, Great Britain, Poland, South Korea, Israel, the Baltic States, Malaysia, Thailand, the countries of the former Yugoslavia and the Middle East. With Timur Bekmambetov's support, the sequel released in the film screens of thirty five countries.

At the 2014 Cannes, distribution manager Diana Yurinova negotiated with Feng Yi of Flame Node company, to give The Snow Queen 2 an entry way into the selective quota-based box office in China. Yurinova states, "This deal is significant for both Wizart Animation and the Russian film industry as a whole since distribution of a Russian animated film in China is unusual." The film managed to release in China with the widest release on record at that time. At the festival, Bollywood Films signed deals with Wizart Animation for theatrical distribution in Pakistan, making it the first time a Russian film has been released theatrically in the country.

Distributors Shooting Stars acquired rights for the Middle East premiere and released it to the cinemas of United Arab Emirates, Qatar, Oman, Iran, Kuwait, Iraq, Syria, Jordan, Egypt, Saudi Arabia and Bahrain. The Snow Queen 2 premiered globally as it was slated to release next spring in 2016 throughout Turkey, Israel, Australia, New Zealand, Japan, Malaysia, Indonesia and Japan.

On 1 March 2015, Wizart organized a special screening of the animated film on the oldest Russian Antarctic station named Mirny. The polar explorers of the Russian Antarctic Expedition (RAE) got the opportunity to see the DVD version of the film. On 18 July 2015, for the first time The Snow Queen 2 premiered in Japan. Katsuhira Yamaguchi of One Piece was one of the voice actors for the release.

The animated film was presented at the international market of audiovisual content MIPCOM, held from 5 to 8, October 2015 in Cannes. The event coincided with its nomination for the Asia Pacific Screen Awards, considered as the Asian Oscars. The film launched in France in DVD under a contract with Universal in conjunction with KLM. On 12 November 2015, the film broadcast in 350 screens in Brazil. Since that date in Brazil more than 280 thousand viewers have watched The Snow Queen 2. The audience view is thrice as much as The Snow Queen audience in 2013 taking into account that the first installment headed to 179 screens only.

The film released in the winter of 2015 in Spain, Bulgaria, Czech Republic and Italy. There were screenings in Vietnam, Romania and Hungary. For the first time, Russian animation was shown in Bolivia in January 2016. The film also premiered in the Philippines. Following Bolivia the film was slated for release to Latin American countries of Chile, Peru and Ecuador. On 19 September 2016, the animation team released a Chinese poster. After the release of the trailers in China, Guangming noted the film is a "tribute to Andersen classic." The film was released in China on 31 December 2016.

As part of the MIPTV international TV market, held in Cannes from 4 April 2016, Wizart Animation announced the conclusion of a contract with one of the world's largest TV broadcasters – Discovery Network Latin America that allowed the film to air in Spanish.

== Reception ==
=== Box office ===
The 3D toon motion film picture was a winter blockbuster. In the pre-release at South Korea, the film attained $1.3 million in just two days after the release on 24 December 2014. After the New Year, the total box office in South Korea was $3 million. The performance made South Korea, one of the most "prosperous" territories in the geography of international sales of Wizart Animation. In Russia, the film received 60 million rubles by 13 January 2015. The film took seventh place in the highest grossing Russian rental box office for 2015 with over 301.8 million rubles. In January 2015, it was reported that The Snow Queen 2 earned $5 million at the international box office. Two million viewers saw the film with the most popular area being from South Korea where it drew 602.6 thousand viewers.

A box office record was set when the film was released in Europe. The film became the first Russian film to top weekend box office in a European country, namely Slovakia. The film was released in Slovakia in December 2015. The only other time the record was set was in 2005 at the release of international hit Night Watch. During the second week of its release there was a 395.5% increase in screens.

According to box office analysts Box Office Mojo, The Snow Queen 2 grossed $37,266 in Slovakia, topping local film Vánocní Kamenák (cs), English-language French 3D animation The Little Prince, Hollywood Bridge of Spies and 3D animation The Good Dinosaur. The record set in 2015 created a new precedent that Russian animation is finding international appeal. The final estimates show the film grossed $4.5 million in Russia. By the end of 8 January 2017, the film attained $4.67 million in China. Since September 2018, the film attained a position at the top ten box office in Portugal. The rental registered a double rate of increases in the box office. There the picture was shown in fifty cities whose premiere bypassed such films as Mission Impossible and Ant-Man and the Wasp. The film collected a net box office of $15.5 million from domestic and foreign markets. The film was one of trends in the Russian film industry in the foreign markets in 2015. In total The Snow Queen franchise has sold to 130 countries to date with a total international box office of $30 million.

=== Critical response ===
The film received mixed-to-positive reviews from critics, although they agreed that it was suitable for audiences of all ages due to its story and animation. A critical film review by The Guardian stated, "There's a frenetic, eye-popping quality to the visuals that forestalls the kind of emotional engagement Disney can offer, but there is some entertainment to be had here." A review from Savette says: "The Snow Queen 2 is Pirates of the Caribbean on ice. You will soon be drawn into the story of lies, deceit and how telling the truth can save the day and possibly save the kingdom. He learns that friendship is the most important thing in life."

Special effects magazine RENDER highlighted key strengths of the film including its special effects, 3D effects, atmosphere, chase scenes and moral story line giving a total of nine out of ten stars. Russian website Allbestmovies gave the film six out of ten stars. KinoKultura noted, "The commercial potential and universal appeal of the Andersen brand cannot be overestimated." Film.ru's review accepted that although the 1957 The Snow Queen adaptation still is the best, The Snow Queen 2 is a "solid sweeping canvas." The review stated the climax battle between trolls, pirates, and ice monsters does not reach the level of The Battle of the Five Armies, but is still comparable. The review also highlighted the sequel's animation: "noticeably stronger computer animation than in the first 'Queen', beautiful and diverse virtual scenery, [and] decent voice-over of all the characters." The review also pointed out how the movie could improve on developing its side characters, emphasizing Gerda's quest alongside Orm and accentuating music.

A review from Evening Moscow (ru) commented that the winter film stands apart from other films by stating the movie has "lot of humor and warmth, which is so lacking in frosty winter days", finding the movie's highlight is not its animation but its message: "But the main thing is not even the stunning beauty of the picture, but the fact that there is the same message of good that has always been in Soviet cartoons."

German review from Film-rezensionen had a mixed review. The review highlighted the film is not without its faults: "There is no longer even a snow queen who could lend the film its title." However, the review did find that the film had improved from its predecessor cinematographically: "The final fight was worth seeing, dramatically as well as visually. Anyway, the Russian animation studio Wizart Animation (completely out of the woods) has significantly polished the look this time. With the blockbuster colleagues from the West, the sequel still can't take up. But it does at least make enough that you can also look at it as a critical observer." German review from Moviebreak stated the users should not judge the film by its cover, because what is in store is a "charming, rather entertaining as easy-going Russian animation." The review concluded by stating, "The Snow Queen 2 turns out to be an entertaining and beautiful fairy tale; at second glance, which might swings into the moral club too much, but always remains humorous and pleasantly cheerful. The film is rather something for our little ones, but also the parents should not get away without a little smile."

Reviews from China were positive toward the film. 2nd by 2nd review states the highlight of the animation is "the world of ice and snow" which has a "different aesthetic than Disney movies, it may be due to Russians more exposure to the ice and snow." Furthermore, the "kernel" of the film is about lies to the point where the children will say "I know to be honest, I can not lie to others." Sina Entertainment Review recalls the audience reaction for the film, "At the same time, the role of the film is also vivid, fresh and full. Almost every character allows the audience to find their own figure, making people feel as if they are in the film, naturally inspired."

A Quebec review remarked the humor with the Grandmother was "well-balanced." The story's explication of "the consequences of the destruction of the power of the Snow Queen on Orm and his entourage" is an "excellent extension of the first film, since it strives to flesh out its own mythology." Emil Calinescu from Romania stated it is "an educational film, with a moralizing message much more obvious than in the case of the first."

=== Accolades ===
| Award | Date of ceremony | Category | Recipient(s) | Result | Ref(s) |
|---|---|---|---|---|---|
| International Children's Film Festival | 2015 | Feature Animation | Timur Bekmambetov; Yuri Moskvin; Vladimir Nikolaev; Diana Yurinova | Won | |
| Nika Award | 3 March 2015 | Animated Film | The Snow Queen 2 | Nominated | |
| Expotoons International Animation Festival | 3 September 2015 | Feature Films | The Snow Queen 2 | Nominated | |
| Suzdalfest | March 2016 | Best Feature Film | The Snow Queen 2 | Won | |
| Amsterdam Film Festival Van Gogh Award | May 2016 | Animation | Aleksey Tsitsilin | Won | |
| Prague Independent Film Festival (PIFF) | August 2016 | Animated Film | The Snow Queen 2 | Won | |
| Asia Pacific Screen Awards | 26 November 2016 | Best Animated Film | The Snow Queen 2 | Nominated | |

== Sequels ==
The sequel bought instant recognition to The Snow Queen brand, as the combined geographical coverage of the series reached 130 countries with many localization added. A third installment, The Snow Queen 3: Fire and Ice was released on 29 December 2016 officially making The Snow Queen series into a trilogy. Hollywood Reporter remarked, that Russian animation ventures are getting a foothold abroad compared to last decade and is considered a resurgent sector in the Russian film industry. In 2018, the fourth installment, The Snow Queen: Mirrorlands was released. The film was received with highest standards at film festivals.

== See also ==
- History of Russian animation
