= Mikhail Yuryevich Tikhonov =

Russian actor

- Born: Moscow, RSFSR, USSR
- Occupation: Actor
- Years active: 1991–present

Mikhail Yuryevich Tikhonov (Russian: Михаил Юрьевич Тихонов) is a Russian actor who contributes to dubbing characters that appear in movies, cartoons, anime, video games and more. He dubs characters that appear in notable TV shows such as Chris McClean in Total Drama, Nick Dean and Hugh Neutron in The Adventures of Jimmy Neutron: Boy Genius and more.

== Biography ==
Tikhonov was born in Moscow, RSFSR, Soviet Union. He entered the film industry during his youth years while the Soviet Union still existed. In 2009, he graduated from the Gerasimov Institute of Cinematography.

== Filmography ==
=== Acting ===
- Iron Curtain-1994
- Web-1992
- Anna Karamazoff

== Russian language dubbing ==
=== Animation ===
- Chris McClean in Total Drama
- Hugh Neutron and Nick Dean in The Adventures of Jimmy Neutron: Boy Genius
- Sunny Bridges in Class of 3000
- Cedric and Matt in W.I.T.C.H.
- Max in Max & Co
- Lexington and Puck in Gargoyles (REN TV edition)
- Professor James Moriarty in Tom and Jerry Meet Sherlock Holmes
- The Joker in "The Batman" (2004), "The Batman vs Dracula" and "The Dark Knight Returns"
- Hal Jordan in Green Lantern: The Animated Series and Batman: The Brave and the Bold
- Andy Larkin in What's with Andy? (season 1)
- Donatello and Mikey in TMNT (2003-2009)
- Sonic the Hedgehog in Sonic X (season 1)
- Sonic the Hedgehog in Sonic OVA
- Human Torch in Fantastic Four: World's Greatest Heroes
- Young Tod in The Fox and the Hound
- Jackie Chan and Valmont in Jackie Chan Adventures (4 & 5 seasons)
- Bill Cipher and Old Man McGucket in Gravity Falls
- Yakko Warner in Animaniacs (Pythagor dubbing, 2014)
- Prince/Master Vegard in The Snow Queen
- Boss in The Snow Queen 2
- Hippie in The Snow Queen 3: Fire and Ice
- Sam I-Am in Green Eggs and Ham (TV series)
- Vegard in The Snow Queen: Mirrorlands

=== Anime ===
- Osamu Dazai in Bungo Stray Dogs
- Yuuichi Katagiri in Tomodachi Game

=== Live action ===
- Peter Shepherd in Jumanji (played by Bradley Pierce)
- Mike Newton in The Twilight Saga: Eclipse (played by Michael Welch)
- Detective Lester Ybarra in Changeling (played by Michael Kelly)
- Marty in Kick-Ass (played by Clark Duke)
- Coach Barker in Avalon High (played by Craig Hall)
- Ice-Man in X-Men franchise (played by Shawn Ashmore)
- Dean Winchester in Supernatural (played by Jensen Ackles)
- Mysterio in Spider-Man: Far From Home (played by Jake Gyllenhaal)

=== Video games ===
- Ratonhnhaké:ton in Assassin's Creed III
- Riddler in Batman: Arkham Asylum
- Suhadi Sadono in Tom Clancy's Splinter Cell: Pandora Tomorrow
- Valerian Mengsk in StarCraft II: Wings of Liberty

== Work as dubbing director ==
- American Pop
- Medicopter 117 (Season 1-3)
- Sonic X
- Hi Hi Puffy AmiYumi
- Class of 3000
- Kick Buttowski: Suburban Daredevil
- Avalon High
- Gravity Falls
- La La Land
