= Laurie Hymes =

American voice actress

- Occupation: Voice actress
- Years active: 2016–present
- Website: lauriehymes.com

Laurie Hymes is an American voice actress known for voicing Lillie in the Pokémon anime, Yu-Gi-Oh!: The Dark Side of Dimensions (2016), Liz and the Blue Bird (2018), Yu-Gi-Oh! Arc-V, Regal Academy (2016) and Lupin III: The First.

== Filmography ==
=== Television ===
Year	Show	Character	Notes
2013–2016	Alisa Knows What to Do!	Alisa	24 episodes
2014–present	Pokémon	Lillie, Pelipper, Plusle	162 episodes
2016	Regal Academy	Vicky Broomstick	50 episodes
2016–2022	Be-be-Bears	Sonya	? episodes
2017	Yu-Gi-Oh! Arc-V	Saya Sasayama	3 episodes
2017–2019	Captain Kracken And His Crew	Sue	? episodes
2018–2019	Polly Pocket Celebrates the Holidays	Shani	19 episodes
2019	Apollo's Tall Tales	Wendy	6 episodes
2019–2020	Caillou's New Adventures	Caillou, Leo	90 episodes
2019–2024	Boy Girl Dog Cat Mouse Cheese	Additional voices	? episodes
2020, 2026	Johnny Test: The Lost Web Series	Susan Test, Mary Test	15 episodes
2021	Transformers: Cyberverse	Swoop	2 episodes

=== Film ===
- Pokémon the Movie: Volcanion and the Mechanical Marvel (2016) - Raleigh
- Yu-Gi-Oh!: The Dark Side of Dimensions (2016) - Sera
- The Snow Queen 3: Fire and Ice (2016) - Gerda
- Fantastic Journey to OZ (2017) - Squirrel
- Liz and the Blue Bird (2018) - Mizore Yoroizuka
- Pokémon the Movie: The Power of Us (2018) - Kelly
- Lupin III: The First (2019) - Laetitia
- The Snow Queen: Mirrorlands (2020) - Gerda
- Mavka:The Forest Song - Mavka
