= The Snow Queen and the Princess =

- Theatrical release poster
- Directed by: Andrey Korenkov; Aleksey Tsitsilin
- Written by: Andrey Korenkov; Vladimir Nikolayev; Aleksey Tsitsilin; Alexey Zamyslov
- Starring: Lina Ivanova; Polina Voychenko; Yuri Romanov; Maria Shustrovna; Svetlana Kuznetsova; Konstantin Panchenko; Andrey Tenetko
- Production company: Wizart Animation
- Distributed by: Cinema Fund
- Release dates: 11 November 2022 (Turkey); 16 February 2023 (Russia)
- Running time: 75 minutes
- Country: Russia
- Language: Russian
- Budget: $3 million

The Snow Queen and the Princess (Russian: Снежная королева: Разморозка, romanized: Snezhnaya koroleva: Razmorozka, lit. 'The Snow Queen: Defrosting') is a 2022 Russian animated fantasy adventure film directed by Andrey Korenkov and Alexey Tsitsilin. It is the sequel to The Snow Queen: Mirrorlands (2018).

The film was released in Russia on February 16, 2023, and digitally released on March 30.

== Filming group ==
- The director — Andrey Korenkov, Alexey Tsitsilin
- Producers — Sergey Selyanova, Vladimir Nikolaev
- Screenplay writers — Andrey Korenkov, Vladimir Nikolaev, Alexey Tsitsilin, Alexey Zamyslov

== Cast ==
- Polina Voychenko — Ila
- Maria Shustrovna — Alfida
- Lina ivanova — Gerda
- Yuri Romanov — Kai
- Konstantin Panchenko — Rollan
- Svetlana Kuznetsova — Snow Queen
- Andrey Tenetko — Dukh severa

== Marketing and sales ==
A trailer for The Snow Queen and the Princess was first published online in late December 2022. The fifth film was released on 16 February 2023, and was later released digitally on 30 March 2023.

== Box office ==
"Snow Queen: Frost" was originally released without advertising support, unlike previous films, so the fifth part was unsuccessful in the rental, having collected only 262 million rubles, under a budget of 179 million. During the first weekend, the film collected only 49 million rubles, becoming the least profitable in the entire series.

== Reviews ==
The Snow Queen and the Princess, at the start, received a negative reception due to the plot and script. But now estimates are more positive. The film received a score of 70/100 based on 1 review.
