= Ramilya Iskander =

Russian actress (born 1977)

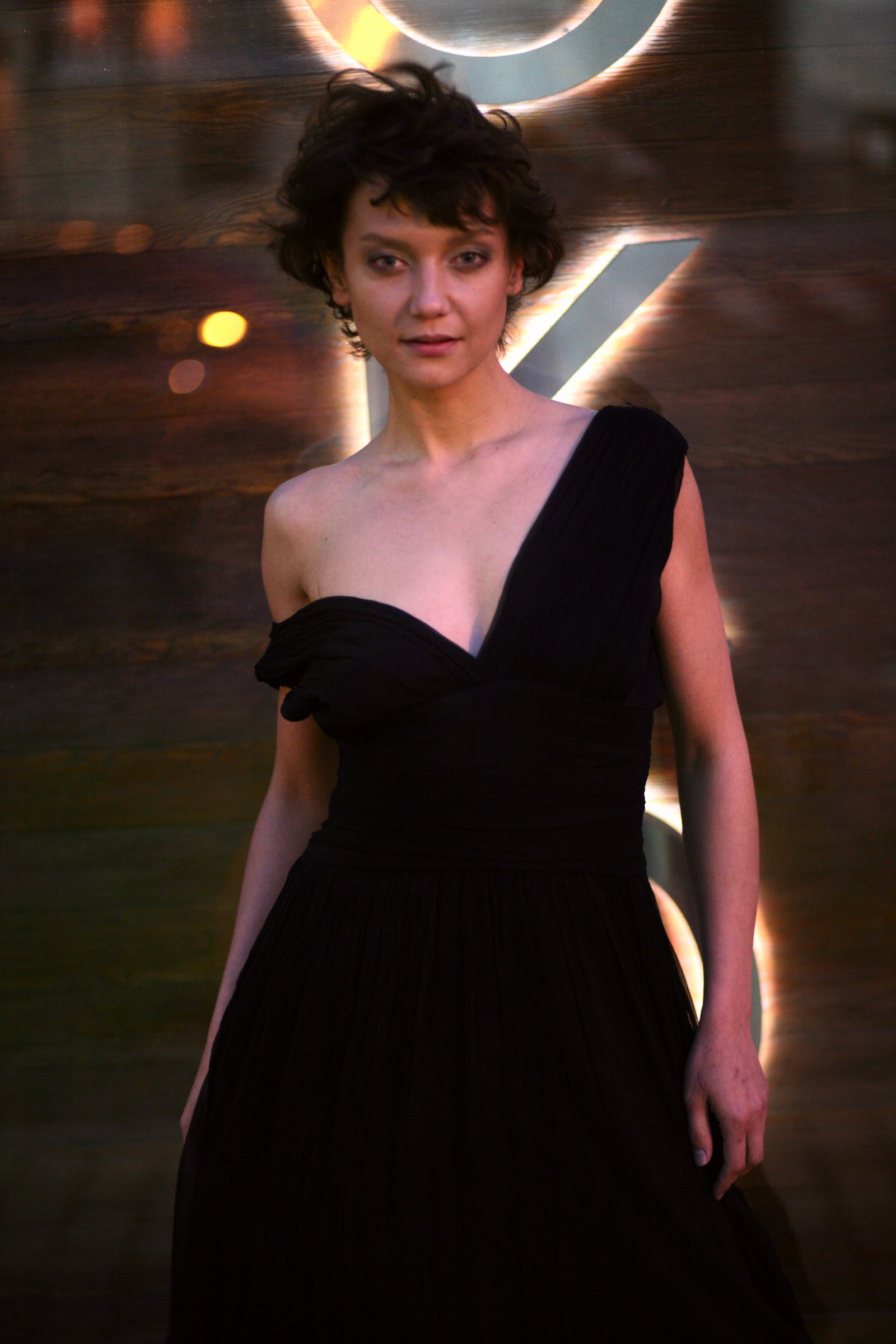
- Born: 24 June 1977 (age 48); Kunashak, Russian SFSR, Soviet Union
- Occupation: Actress

Ramilya Rifovna Iskander (Russian: Рамиля Рифовна Искандер, Tatar: Рамилә Риф кызы Хисамова, romanized: Ramilə Rif kızı Xisamova; born 24 June 1977) is a Russian actress and former model who has acted mainly in theatre and television series. Since 2003, she has been a member of the regular cast of the Russian Academic Youth Theatre (RAMT) in Moscow.

== Early life ==
Iskander was born in the village of Kunashak, near the city of Chelyabinsk. She is an ethnic Tatar. Her father was an engineer and her mother was a teacher. Iskander was part of her school choir, where she was a solo singer. At the instance of her father, she studied economics at university for some time, but secretly applied for courses at the Chelyabinsk State Institute of Culture to study acting.

== Career ==
Iskander graduated in 1999 and began her acting career at the Chelyabinsk Youth Theatre. In 2002, Iskander moved to Moscow, where she initially starred in the Stanislavski and Nemirovich-Danchenko Theatre. The following year, she moved to the Russian Academic Youth Theatre, known as RAMT. She has been awarded the Moscow City Theater Prize 2013 and the Golden Lyre 2010, among others. In addition to her theatrical work, Iskander has acted in television series and commercials, as well as a voice actress in animations and dubbing of foreign language films. Her first film role was in the detective series Operativy Psevdonim (Russian: Оперативный псевдоним) in 2005. Her most significant film role to date is the female lead in the film Tsar (Царь, 2009) directed by Pavel Lungin, in which she starred Maria Temryukovna, the wife of Tsar Ivan the Terrible.

== Personal life ==
Iskander gave birth to her first son in August 2013.

=== Arrest ===
In 2023, Iskander was arrested after police found almost 2 kilograms (4.4 lb) of mephedrone hidden in the door of her car. They also found a "white powdery substance" on the lid of a food container that contained amphetamine and 50 grams (1.8 oz) of cocaine. She had purchased 2.6 kilograms (5.7 lb) of mephedrone and gave some to her friend to take to Penza, and kept the rest. On February 15, she listed 300 grams (11 oz) of mephedrone for sale online. Her accomplices, Yaroslav Shalev and Vladimir Kholkin, were arrested as well. They were all charged under Section 5 of Article 228.1 of the Criminal Code of Russia. The prosecution sought sentences of 8 years in a strict regime penal colony for Shalev and Kholkin, and 11 years in a general regime penal colony for Iskander. She pleaded guilty and was sentenced on 27 May 2024 to 6.5 years of imprisonment in a general regime corrective labor colony for attempted distribution of narcotics on a particularly large scale. Shalev and Kholkin were sentenced to 5 years in a strict regime penal colony and 5.5 years in a strict regime penal colony respectively.

According to unnamed friends of Iskander, she was in dire need of money because her mother had cancer and needed expensive treatment that Iskander could not afford and was also a single mother. Iskander had already sold her apartment, was asking friends for money and shelter, and took out loans. She did not use drugs herself. In February 2025, Iskander's father petitioned Vladimir Putin for a pardon.
