= The Snow Queen 3: Fire and Ice =

The Snow Queen 3
- Russian theatrical release poster
- Directed by: Aleksey Tsitsilin
- Written by: Aleksey Tsitsilin; Vladimir Nikolaev; Alexey Zamyslov; Andrey Korenkov
- Produced by: Yuri Moskvin; Vladimir Nikolayev
- Starring: Natalia Bystrova; Nikolay Bystrov; Filipp Lebedev; Olga Zubkova; Diomid Vinogradov; Olga Shorokhova; Vsevolod Kuznetsov; Irina Deriyenkova; Aleksandr Gruzdev
- Edited by: Robert Lence
- Music by: Fabrizio Mancinelli
- Production companies: Wizart Animation; 3Beep
- Distributed by: Universal Pictures
- Release date: 29 December 2016 (Russia)
- Running time: 89 minutes
- Country: Russia
- Language: Russian
- Budget: $6.3 million
- Box office: $24.6 million

The Snow Queen 3: Fire and Ice (Russian: Снежная королева 3: Огонь и лёд, romanized: Snezhnaya koroleva 3: Ogon i lyod) is a 2016 Russian animated fantasy adventure film directed by Aleksey Tsitsilin. It is the sequel to The Snow Queen 2 (2014). In the film, Gerda and her friends embark on a new journey to reunite her family.

Simultaneous release and promotional activities were planned during the theatrical distribution period. After trailers aired in November 2016, the film debuted in Russia on 29 December 2016. Thereafter, it was released in various European countries, as well as throughout Latin America over the years up to 2018. The film set a foreign box office record for a Russian animation film.

A sequel, The Snow Queen: Mirrorlands, was released in 2018.

== Plot ==
The film is about the importance of family and helping. Gerda still has an unfinished dream to find her parents who were once taken away from them by the North Wind and finally reunite the family. The tireless pirate Alfida, laughable anteater-like troll Orm, and his furry companion, weasel Luta will help her achieve the dream. Several years have passed since the events of the films The Snow Queen and The Snow Queen 2: Magic of the Ice Mirror. Kai and Gerda are national heroes and regularly tell the story of how they defeated the Snow Queen. Kai and Gerda are tired of wandering and go to visit Orm. Together with Alfida they journey to the land of the trolls. Orm introduce them to a cheerful guy named Rollan. He is a Spaniard, who is a researcher on urban legends.

The pirates, who are commanded by the Pirate Boss Lady, have robbed the bank of a small seaside town. Only one man resisted them who was nicknamed Rollan the Legend. Disarming him, the Pirate Boss Lady gave him the book "Legends of Trolls." Rollan spins tales of great grandeur and Gerda tugs along with her own version. Gerda states how she defeated the Snow Queen accidentally. This caused Kai to be distressed because they already made a pact, that they will never again reveal that story and boast about their past. Rollan gapes with astonishment at the truth while Kai quarrels and sails away with Alfida. Rollan comes back to his wits as he tells a real legend. Rollan tells Gerda the story of the Wishing Stone - an artifact that, according to legends, can fulfill any desire, and it is located in the forbidden caves under Lake Gao.

Thereafter they seek the artifact. They go into the forbidden troll caves. The pair fall into an underground chamber protected by robots. They escape the attacks and find their path to the resting place of the Wishing Stone. Only after reaching their destination, do they learn that the stone is composed of two magic parts: the Stone of Fire and Ice. Upon touching it, Gerda and Rollan are possessed by the spirits of the Snow Queen and the Fire King, gaining ice and fire powers respectively. Pursued by troll king Arrog's soldiers, the two flee out of the village while their newfound powers begin to wreak havoc on the surrounding environment. A distance away, Kai and Alfida notice the chaos and head back to make sure Gerda is safe.

Gerda and Rollan meet up with Orm, who informs them of a library with knowledge of troll legends. Gerda creates an ice train and they return to the troll village and enter the library, where they learn that they have been afflicted by a curse whereupon they will receive the powers of the Snow Queen and Fire King; however, by sunset, they will be consumed by their spirits entirely. To revoke the curse, they must return to the Wishing Stone and free themselves of the spirits. The two are caught by the troll shaman, who attempts to kill them, but he is stopped by Arrog, who trusts Gerda and allows her and Rollan entry into the Wishing Stone's chamber. The two make it to the Wishing Stone and Gerda relinquishes herself of the Snow Queen's spirit, but Rollan betrays her, revealing he deliberately brought about the curse in order to have the Fire King's power for himself. He leaves Gerda for dead and returns to the troll village, whereupon he is fully consumed by the Fire King, who goes on a rampage.

Kai and Alfida arrive in the village during the chaos. Kai frees Gerda, and the two reconcile. Gerda formulates a plan to drive the Fire King into the lake by bombarding it with barrels of ice, but they run out of ammunition as it is at the edge. As the Fire King attempts to kill Kai, Gerda mans the ice train and rams into the Fire King, sending them both plunging into the lake. Everyone mourns Gerda's supposed death, but she emerges unscathed. The trolls celebrate, and Gerda and Kai are awarded with a pile of gold from Arrog.

While sailing off with Alfida, Gerda and Kai are led to a frozen mountain by a miniature snow fairy created by the Snow Queen's magic, where the frozen bodies of Gerda and Kai's parents are secretly encased. The snow fairy thaws them out, and Gerda and Kai happily reunite with their parents.

== Cast ==
Character	Original	English
Gerda	Nataliya Bystrova	Laurie Hymes
Kai	Nikolay Bystrov	Jason Griffith
Rollan	Filipp Lebedev	Graham Halstead
Orm	Diomid Vinogradov	Billy Bob Thompson
Alfida	Olga Zubkova	Devin Bailey Griffin
Arrog	Vsevolod Kuznetsov	Scott Rayow
Maribel	Irina Deriyenkova	Lori Gardner
Shaman	Aleksandr Gruzdev	Marc Thompson
Grandma	Olga Shorokhova	Vanessa Johansson
Rahat	Oleg Novikov	Tom Wayland
Locum	Fill Savenkov	Marc Thompson
Hippie	Mikhail Tikhonov	Marc Thompson
Pirate Boss Lady	Olga Zubkova	Samara Nayemi
Troll Kids	Olga Zubkova; Olga Shorokhova	Lori Gardner; Eileen Stevens; Alyson Leigh Rosenfeld
Snow Queen	Katerina Afrikantova	Eileen Stevens
Luta	Dee Bradley Baker	Dee Bradley Baker

== Production ==
=== Development ===
With the impetus to sustain The Snow Queen series, Wizart Animation undertook a third installation. Production started with the first official poster premiering at 2015 Cannes Film Festival. The picture became one of the first Russian-Chinese co-production in film history as Beijing's Flame Node Entertainment became one of the producers of the film. The scriptwriters were Aleksey Tsitsilin, Vladimir Nikolaev, Alexey Zamyslov, and Andrey Korenkov. Robert Lence, an animator and story writer, who has previously served as one of the Beauty and the Beast, A Bug’s Life and Home on the Range writers for studios Walt Disney Studio, Pixar, and DreamWorks consulted with the script writing team. From initial snippets to the final version, about 53 variants of the plot development were written. The screenplay started to be written two years ago before the announcement of the film and after going through over fifty changes, it was completed only in 183 days. The most difficult part of the script writing experience was the episode where Gerda receives the Wishing Stone.

Director Aleksey Tsitsilin remarked Robert Lence's expertise in adapting the screenplay for the international audience. Robert Lence gave a positive feedback to the film. Lence says, "I’m really charmed with wonderful world of the Trolls that the authors have created. It brings a unique story to the animated film. 'Snow Queen' is a good message for kids – importance of families and friends combined with humor and fun. The characters realize how they really need each other, the true value of being a family."

The writers used the theme of adventure as a focal point of the plot. The artifact Wishing Stone will be the motif that drives the plot. The ancient artifact is depicted as a wish fulfillment object despite its side effects of unprecedented environmental change. When the characters wrest the Wishing Stone from its pedestal, climatic fire effects occur. This episode parallels media references to the many adventure suspense films of the 1900s such as Indiana Jones and the Raiders of the Lost Ark. The film is added into the historical fantasy category when the characters investigate the motif object's history in catacombs and libraries. The protagonists become fairy tale archaeologists. The writers also developed the message of kinship and family values.

The Russian voice cast included Nataliya Bystrova (ru) as Gerda. Diomid Vinogradov voiced Orm, Nikolay Bystrov voiced Kai, Filipp Lebedev voiced Rollan, and Olga Zubkova (ru) voiced Alfida. The English cast included Laurie Hymes as Gerda, Billy Bob Thompson as Orm, Jason Griffith as Kai, and Graham Halstead as Rollan.

During the American Film Market in November 2015, Wizart presented new materials for Fire and Ice. At the exhibition a new character Rollan was introduced, who is described as a collector of legends. At the AFM, Polish company Kino Świat (pl) committed for a wide release in Poland.

=== Animation ===
The animators continued their artistry in CGI animation for The Snow Queen: Fire and Ice. Artists went to Spain for inspiration. Over three hundred sketches of streets, buildings and the coast were made. However, the Scandinavian landscape from the original series was still present in the film. For visualization, a 3D model was made in the center of the animation studio. Designs of the panorama in the City of Trolls was inspired by a specific place on the Scandinavian Peninsula, the Ringedalsvatnet. There the iconic Norwegian rock formation Troll Tongue rock (Trolltunga) was chosen as a template for the film sets. A Gérardmer review stated, "the Trolls are a beautiful invention, a chimera between Rabbits and Moomins." The animation required eighteen hours of 2D animation. For 3D, the animators rendered about 55,000 images, far more than five thousand images required for The Snow Queen 2. The animation in terms of numbers included the depiction of around 1,342 original trees and 350 variations of the wardrobe of the three main human characters.

Animators introduced a new villain - the Fire King, a spider volcano which required the most effort in design. Other sophisticated designs included the underground lava chamber in Lake Gao. Before animation, the cues from the voice actor's expression served as a guide for later production. During the preparation of the animated film, five hours of acting were recorded. The emotions of the performers were based on the principles pioneered by social psychologist Paul Ekman. The juxtaposition of fire and ice was developed as a theme for the film. To design animated lava, specialists drew inspiration from over 23 hours of lava video.

A typical frame of the cartoon consists of forty to fifty working layers on which the light is exposed. The backgrounds and characters are correctly highlighted so that the color of the picture is transmitted to the viewer with maximum saturation. The setting Lake Gao in comparison required over 250 layers. Ice special effects such as the avalanche episode required in-depth memory. One second of the working video of an avalanche, after gluing all the frames and "collecting" all layers with light, required ten gigabytes. The pirates of Alfida were bought back from the sequel. The entire team of pirates characters were used to full capacity. The character Snow Queen would be developed with humor and the character weasel Luta would resume the animated gags.

=== Soundtrack ===
The original score was composed by Fabrizio Mancinelli who had worked on a number of projects such as Disney's Growing up with Nine Old Men (directed by Ted Thomas). The composer noted the score for the movie is one of his best works to date. The theme song was discovered by exploring a whistling tune during production. The music for the soundtrack was recorded by Budapest Scoring under the direction of Peter Pejtsik. The lyrics were written by singer, songwriter and guitarist Johnny Dav who has previously composed the music for TV series A Matter of Honor and Family Business. The Russian actress of musicals, Natalia Bystrova and the winner of “Musical Heart of Theater” performed the main song “Fire and Ice." Drew Ryniewicz of X-Factor also gave voice to the feature track. The Korean band WJSN / COSMIC GIRLS voiced the theme song rendered for the South Korean audience. Starship Entertainment's Yoo Yeon-jung and Dawon (singer) created the album: The Snow Queen 3 : Fire & Ice OST. Singer-songwriter Eve Ottino sung the theme song "Le feu et la glace" for the French release.

== Release ==
=== Theatrical ===
On 29 December 2016 the film was shown for the first time all across Russia and the Commonwealth of Independent States simultaneously. The trequel had a wide release in Russia, Estonia, Lithuania, Latvia, South Korea, Poland, Romania, Bulgaria, Cypress, the UAE and Turkey in the New Year holiday. It was also the biggest Russian animation of the year screening in just about every film theater in the country. Blitz released the third installment in Croatia, Slovenia, Bosnia and Herzegovina, Serbia, Montenegro, Macedonia, Kosovo and Albania.

On 1 January 2017, Wizart Animation organized a special screening on the oldest Russian Antarctic station named Mirny. The Russian Antarctic Expedition (RAE) members received a special cargo of New Year cards along with the DVD of the film. The members of the expedition were one of the first people to see the animated film and share their impressions from it.

International sales manager Anna Pokorskaya handled foreign distributions that gave the film a global trajectory. Pokorskaya remarked, despite a small budget, the film was highly received by distributors. In January 2017, the film was released in South Korea with over 450 screens. Afterwards, the film was presented to the European audience. Wizart concluded a deal with Universal Pictures Video France for distribution across France and the French-speaking territories in Europe and Africa. It was the first Russian animated feature ever released in French-speaking territories. Just before the release in France, it was nominated for out of competition selection at the Festival de Gérardmer in 2018. The film also released in Portugal through Cinemundo and Indonesia through PT.Satuvisi Abadi (Onevision Entertainment).

After widespread release in over fifty Europe and Asian markets, the film premiered globally across Oceania, the Americas, and Africa. In 2017 distributor Odin’s Eye released the film in Australia and New Zealand. The film released in Latin American territories after California Films picked up the distribution rights. The film was screened at the January 2017 USA Film Festival. In August 2018, the film released in select US theaters via Vertical Entertainment. It was the second Russian release in the US distribution of films in 2018 after Dislike film.

The film was distributed by Cinémas Guzzo for Canada in 2018. Japanese company the Klockworx Co., Ltd. (ja) agreed to distribute the film in 2018. Quebec-based distributor Cinémas Guzzo distributed the film in Canadian French-speaking market. The film released in South Africa, as well as neighboring nations Namibia, Zimbabwe and Lesotho with the release handled by Indigenous Film Distribution who previously partnered on the first two The Snow Queen films. The animation made its debut in China on 5 April 2018 as the release coincided with the national Qinming Festival. The distributor was Turbo Films who allocated 8000 screens for the film. In total the fantasy adventure has been sold to over 150 countries. Rai TV in Italy agreed to broadcast The Snow Queen series, including The Snow Queen 3: Fire and Ice.

== Reception ==
=== Box office ===
The winter family adventure film was an animation blockbuster. The initial budget estimates was of 360 million rubles (6.3 million dollars). After release of the film to domestic and international screens, records were set in Russia . In total in Russia the film took in $5.14 million from 1,170 cinema screens.

Wizart Animation announced that as of 8 April 2017, Russian Animation Day, The Snow Queen 3: Fire and Ice became the highest-grossing Russian film in foreign box office. The third installment, added $26,000 from just thirteen Canadian cinemas to its earnings, bringing its worldwide total (excluding Russia) to $20.28 million. The previous overseas box office record for a Russian film was Mongol (2007), a co-production of Russia, Germany and Kazakhstan which brought in $20.27 million outside Russia. In South Korea, the film attained the status of the best start of an independent animation studio in 2017 with a collection of $2.39 million.

According to the Press Service of Wizart Animation, preliminary results from five weeks in Bulgaria, demonstrated the film had the best start among independent animation studios in the last twenty years as it entered the top-ten box-office hits. The film was a box office hit in Poland. It went to the top charts at the box-office in the Czech Republic and Slovakia, as it released in 215 film theaters. The box-office resulted in 144 thousand euros. As noted by representatives of distribution company Cinemart, “these are the best numbers in the history of screenings of all the parts of the franchise in Czechia and Slovakia in the premier weekend." The film demonstrated great performance in Turkey. Released on 24 February 2017, within 253 theatrical screens, the film attracted more viewers than its prequels.

The cartoon became the highest-grossing Russian film in China earning $11.55 million (CN¥72.09M yuan) and slightly pulling ahead of Stalingrad (2013). The opening was $2.74 million (a record for Russian animation). Following the results of the first weekend starting from 5 April 2018, the third part of The Snow Queen took the third place in the top of the Chinese box-office. Due to the popular demand, the theatrical run of the Snow Queen 3 was officially extended by Chinese film regulators. The film stayed in the theaters until June 2018, coinciding with the National Children's Day. As a comparison, an average theatrical release in China generally lasts for about a month. Adding the overseas performance, the film had a total gross of $24.6 million. The film was awarded the "Blockbuster" recognition as the highest-grossing Russian film at the Western market in 2018, and occupies sixth in rankings of Kingsboro based on all animated films of all independent studios in the world, that were running in theaters in 2017-2018. The profit was four times the budget (rubles). Together with the rental in Russia, the cartoon earned about $30 million.

=== Critical response ===
The film received three stars from Common Sense Media. The critical review noted the film's representation of a positive role model and messages: "The characters learn the importance of standing by and protecting your family."

Russian reviews were positive toward the film. A critical review by Makzim Markov from Ridus gave the film four stars. Critical review by Film.ru commended, "An interesting and beautiful Russian fairy-tale cartoon comedy in which Gerda finds the magic of the Snow Queen. If the main Russian animated series on the domestic market is by St. Petersburg studio's "Melnitsa", then the best series for the foreign market is Snow Queen by the Voronezh studio Wizart Animation. This is a real extravaganza of bright colors and spectacular designs." Critical review at Izvestia remarked, "In the new film, children will again laugh at the Troll Orm, and their parents will be touched by the joy of their children."

Maria Tereschenko of Kino-Teatr found the film excellent in its presentation of family values by stating, "Snow Queen 3 continues the theme of 'family values' and loyalty to loved ones stated in the first two episodes. This is another story about how the heart of each of us can become a battleground of good and evil, and only the love of loved ones can save the heroes from rash actions or disastrous consequences." The film props received recognition as they were interesting too: "The creators pay attention to the costumes of the main characters, of which a lot was made for the film (indeed, Gerda's snow dress is beautiful), but even more, perhaps, the peculiar vehicles that appear in this franchise are striking. A beautiful carriage, a ship that rides on ice, a beautiful ice train... and at the hottest moment, Kai has to jump on ice floes floating in hot lava…"

The film received positive critical review from Mironova Anastasia of New Look Media who said: "An extremely positive and life-affirming cartoon, imbued with a mortal instructive sense of fighting evil and injustice, despite everything, teaches you to fight only with good deeds and deeds, never using evil and negativity in return. Decorated with incendiary and eccentric, but at the same time very kind and cute computer tricks created for the characteristics of each character, makes the cartoon "Fire and Ice" even more comical and exciting."

KinoKultura review by Natalie Kononenko stated: "It is strikingly beautiful. Wizart Studios started out making video games and a game based on this film is already available. As a result of this gaming background, Snow Queen is made in 3-D and it is gorgeous. The fire scenes are especially effective. Rollan with his burning hair and glowing suit is striking, as is Lake Gao, the forbidden lake of fire which Gerda and Rollan must cross. The fire-tossing scenes are vivid as are the scenes where Gerda makes ice formations."

French reviews such as Avoir-Alire noted: "It is a fantastic tale for young and old, staged in a world where trolls and humans come together. The characters are warm, endearing, and evolve in visually more complete settings than in the previous two opuses: the snowy landscapes, the small wooden houses where trolls live, the bluish night, recall the beautiful landscapes of Russia, but also of Northern Europe. The animation is also quite successful, enjoying a sharper graphics, less digital appearance, less artificial and therefore more authentic. The movements of the characters are fluid and well detailed. In short, the overall aesthetic is quite pleasant." Le Parisien remarked, "But the little ones will soon find their mark within the merry band of characters and their adventures in the Far North, more faithful to the original story than Frozen. Inevitably, we can't help but play the game of the seven differences, starting with those between the heroes, with here an evil Snow Queen and there the nice Elsa. There are trolls, a frozen kingdom, and values - love, friendship, fidelity, courage - advocated in both films. And the Russian version also has its heady little song, "Fire and Ice".

German reviews were positive toward the film with one review from Film-Rezensionen saying aside from the "lack of continuity therefore remains a weak point of the series", overall Wizart Animation is improving and setting precedents with each new installment. Moviebreak highlighted one weakness of the movie which was "its quite erratic narrative style and in some places a lack of character depth." Otherwise the movie is a perfect entertainer stating, "the film by director Aleksey Tsitsilin offers excellent entertainment. The action is good, the characters are humorous and the story, despite its jumpiness, is exciting and breathtaking. This along with a fabulously staged fantasy world, allows the film to be fun for young and old."

Sofahelden commended the movie is an apt continuation from the prequel: "The plot is an equally fitting sequel to the previous story as well as an independent, exciting, and adventurous journey that knows how to please, even if you don't know the previous parts."

=== Accolades ===
Award	Date of ceremony	Category	Recipient(s)	Result	Ref(s)
Calcutta International Cult Film Festival	November 2016	Best Animated Film	The Snow Queen 3: Fire and Ice	Runner-up	
Lahore International Children's Film Festival (LICFF)	6 December 2017	Feature Animation	The Snow Queen 3: Fire and Ice	Won	
Cartoons on the Bay	6 April 2017	Animated Feature Film	The Snow Queen 3: Fire and Ice	Nominated	
CICAF (China International Cartoon Animation Festival)	Spring 2018	Animation Feature	The Snow Queen 3: Fire and Ice	Nominated	
GUKIFF (Guro Kids International Film Festival)	2018	Animation	The Snow Queen 3: Fire and Ice	Won	
Suzdalfest	17 March 2018	Best Feature Film	Aleksey Tsitsilin	Won	
International Animated Film Festival WFAF (Varna-2018)	2018	Animation	The Snow Queen 3: Fire and Ice	Nominated	
Marbella International Film Festival	17 July 2018	Animation, Feature	Aleksey Tsitsilin	Nominated	
Xinguang Award International Animation Competition	28 September 2018	Best Animated Feature Film	Wizart Animation	Nominated	

== Sequel ==
A fourth installment, The Snow Queen: Mirrorlands, was released on 21 December 2018 in Poland and on 1 January 2019 in Russia. The film was also received in UK and Ireland on 7 August 2020. The film was packaged to the continent of North America in cable TV on 18 December 2020. The film was well received by critics noting its innovative plot and the studio Wizart Animation itself is continuing to develop their craftsmanship. Today The Snow Queen animated tetralogy series has managed to be released to over 150 countries and has been translated into 30 languages.

== See also ==
- List of animated feature films of 2016
