= Hans Christian Andersen bibliography =

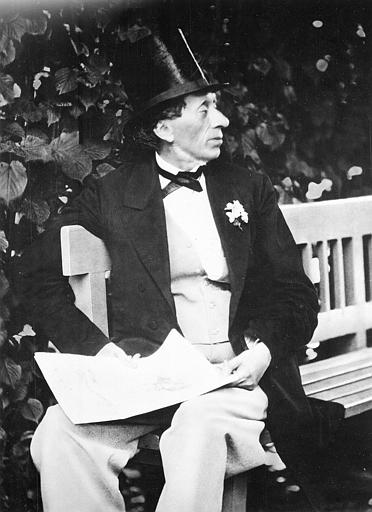
Hans Christian Andersen in the garden of "Roligheden" near Copenhagen, in 1869.

This is a list of published works by Hans Christian Andersen. The list has been supplemented with a few important posthumous editions of his works; the year given in each entry refers to the first Danish edition. They are all in the public domain because Andersen died over 100 years ago.

== Works by type ==
=== Novels ===
- The Improvisatore (Improvisatoren) (1835), C.A. Reitzel Publishers
- O. T. (1836), C.A. Reitzel Publishers
- Only a Fiddler (Kun en Spillemand) (1837), C.A. Reitzel Publishers
- The Two Baronesses (De to Baronesser) (1848), C.A. Reitzel Publishers
- To be or not to be? (At være eller ikke være) (1857)
- Lucky Peer (Lykke-Peer) (1870), C.A. Reitzel Publishers
- Sorøe Gang (1935), published posthumously, unfinished
- Fragmenter af en ufuldført historisk Roman (1935), published posthumously, unfinished
- Christian den Andens Dverg (1935), published posthumously, unfinished

=== Children's short stories ===
==== All short stories ====
A Picture Book without Pictures (Billedbog uden Billeder) series:

1. "First Evening" ("Første Aften") (1839)
2. "Second Evening" ("Anden Aften") (1839)
3. "Third Evening" ("Tredie Aften") (1839)
4. "Fourth Evening" ("Fjerde Aften") (1839)
5. "Fifth Evening" ("Femte Aften") (1839)
6. "Sixth Evening" ("Sjette Aften") (1839)
7. "Seventh Evening" ("Syvende Aften") (1839)
8. "Eighth Evening" ("Ottende Aften") (1839)
9. "Ninth Evening" ("Niende Aften") (1839)
10. "Tenth Evening" ("Tiende Aften") (1839)
11. "Eleventh Evening" ("Ellevte Aften") (1839)
12. "Twelfth Evening" ("Tolvte Aften") (1839)
13. "Thirteenth Evening" ("Trettende Aften") (1839)
14. "Fourteenth Evening" ("Fjortende Aften") (1839)
15. "Fifteenth Evening" ("Femtende Aften") (1839)
16. "Sixteenth Evening" ("Sextende Aften") (1839)
17. "Seventeenth Evening" ("Syttende Aften") (1839)
18. "Eighteenth Evening" ("Attende Aften") (1839)
19. "Nineteenth Evening" ("Nittende Aften") (1839)
20. "Twentieth Evening" ("Tyvende Aften") (1839)
21. "Twenty-first Evening" ("En og tyvende Aften") (1840)
22. "Twenty-second Evening" ("To og tyvende Aften" (1840)
23. "Twenty-third Evening" ("Tre og tyvende Aften") (1840)
24. "Twenty-fourth Evening" ("Fire og tyvende Aften") (1844)
25. "Twenty-fifth Evening" ("Fem og tyvende Aften" (1840)
26. "Twenty-sixth Evening" ("Sex og tyvende Aften") (1840)
27. "Twenty-seventh Evening" ("Syv og tyvende Aften") (1840)
28. "Twenty-eighth Evening" ("Otte og tyvende Aften") (1840)
29. "Twenty-ninth Evening" ("Ni og tyvende Aften") (1840)
30. "Thirtieth Evening" ("Tredivte Aften") (1840)
31. "Thirty-first Evening" ("Een og tredivte Aften") (1844)
32. "Thirty-second Evening" ("To og tredivte Aften") (1847)
33. "Thirty-third Evening" ("Tre og tredivte Aften") (1847)
34. "Den første Aften" (1943), published posthumously

==== Fairy tales and stories ====
Andersen had a "canon" of 156 stories he called "Eventyr og Historier" ("fairy tales and stories). They were numbered with an eventyrkode by Svend Juel Møller in his Bidrag til H.C. Andersens Bibliografi (Contributions to Hans Christian Andersen's Bibliography, 1966).

Eventyrkode	English language title	Danish language title	Date
1	The Tinderbox	Fyrtøiet	8 May 1835
2	Little Claus and Big Claus	Lille Claus og store Claus	8 May 1835
3	The Princess and the Pea	Prindsessen paa Ærten	8 May 1835
4	Little Ida's Flowers	Den lille Idas Blomster	8 May 1835
5	Thumbelina	Tommelise	16 December 1835
6	The Naughty Boy	Den uartige Dreng	16 December 1835
7	The Traveling Companion	Reisekammeraten	16 December 1835
8	The Little Mermaid	Den lille Havfrue	7 April 1837
9	The Emperor's New Clothes	Keiserens nye Klæder	7 April 1837
10	The Galoshes of Fortune	Lykkens Kalosker	19 May 1838
11	The Daisy	Gaaseurten	2 October 1838
12	The Steadfast Tin Soldier	Den standhaftige Tinsoldat	2 October 1838
13	The Wild Swans	De vilde Svaner	2 October 1838
14	The Rose Elf	Rosen-Alfen	19 May 1839
15	The Garden of Paradise	Paradisets Have	19 October 1839
16	The Flying Trunk	Den flyvende Kuffert	19 October 1839
17	The Storks	Storkene	19 October 1839
18	The Wicked Prince	Den onde Fyrste	October 1840
19	Ole Lukøje	Ole Lukøie	20 December 1841
20	The Swineherd	Svinedrengen	20 December 1841
21	The Buckwheat	Boghveden	20 December 1841
22	The Angel	Engelen	11 November 1843
23	The Nightingale	Nattergalen	11 November 1843
24	The Sweethearts;or, The Top and the Ball	Kjærestefolkene [Toppen og bolden]	11 November 1843
25	The Ugly Duckling	Den grimme Ælling	11 November 1843
26	The Fir Tree	Grantræet	21 December 1844
27	The Snow Queen	Sneedronningen	21 December 1844
28	The Elder-Tree Mother	Hyldemoer	December 1844
29	The Elf Mound	Elverhøi	7 April 1845
30	The Red Shoes	De røde Skoe	7 April 1845
31	The Jumpers	Springfyrene	7 April 1845
32	The Shepherdess and the Chimney-Sweep	Hyrdinden og Skorsteensfeieren	7 April 1845
33	Holger Danske	Holger Danske	7 April 1845
34	The Bell	Klokken	May 1845
35	Grandmother	Bedstemoder	5 October 1845
36	The Darning Needle	Stoppenaalen	December 1845
37	The Little Match Girl	Den lille Pige med Svovlstikkerne	December 1845
38	A View from Vartou's Window	Fra et Vindue i Vartou	December 1846
39	A Picture from the Ramparts	Et Billede fra Castelsvolden	December 1846
40	The Old Street Lamp	Den gamle Gadeløgte	6 April 1847
41	The Neighboring Families	Nabofamilierne	6 April 1847
42	Little Tuck	Lille Tuk	6 April 1847
43	The Shadow	Skyggen	6 April 1847
44	The Old House	Det gamle Huus	December 1847
45	The Drop of Water	Vanddraaben	December 1847
46	The Happy Family	Den lykkelige Familie	December 1847
47	The Story of a Mother	Historien om en Moder	December 1847
48	The Shirt Collar	Flipperne	December 1847
49	The Flax	Hørren	1848
50	The Phoenix Bird	Fugl Phønix	May 1850
51	There is a Difference	"Der er Forskjel"	November 1851
52	The World's Fairest Rose	Verdens deiligste Rose	November 1851
53	Thousands of Years from Now	Om Aartusinder	26 January 1852
54	The Swan's Nest	Svanereden	28 January 1852
55	The Old Tombstone	Den gamle Gravsteen	February 1852
56	The Story of the Year	Aarets Historie	5 April 1852
57	On Judgment Day	Paa den yderste Dag	5 April 1852
58	It's Quite True!	Det er ganske vist!	5 April 1852
59	A Good Humor	Et godt Humeur	5 April 1852
60	Heartache	Hjertesorg	30 November 1852
61	Everything in its Proper Place	"Alt paa sin rette Plads!"	30 November 1852
62	The Goblin and the Grocer	Nissen hos Spekhøkeren	30 November 1852
63	Under The Willow Tree	Under Piletræet	30 November 1852
64	Five Peas from a Pod	Fem fra en Ærtebælg	December 1852
65	She Was Good for Nothing	"Hun duede ikke"	December 1852
66	Two Maidens	To Jomfruer	November 1853
67	The Last Pearl	Den sidste Perle	February 1853
68	At the Uttermost Parts of the Sea	Ved det yderste Hav	December 1854
69	The Money Pig	Pengegrisen	December 1854
70	A Leaf from Heaven	Et Blad fra Himlen	February 1853
71	Clumsy Hans	Klods-Hans	30 April 1855
72	Ib and Little Christine	Ib og lille Christine	30 April 1855
73	The Thorny Road of Honor	"Ærens Tornevei"	December 1855
74	The Jewish Girl	Jødepigen	December 1855
75	A String of Pearls	Et stykke Perlesnor	December 1856
76	The Bell Deep	Klokkedybet	December 1856
77	The Bottle Neck	Flaskehalsen	December 1857
78	Soup on a Sausage Peg	Suppe paa en Pølsepind	2 March 1858
79	The Nightcap of the "Pebersvend"	Pebersvendens Nathue	2 March 1858
80	Something	"Noget"	2 March 1858
81	The Old Oak Tree's Last Dream	Det gamle Egetræes sidste Drøm	2 March 1858
82	The A-B-C Book	ABC-Bogen	2 March 1858
83	The Marsh King's Daughter	Dynd-Kongens Datter	15 May 1858
84	The Racers	Hurtigløberne	15 May 1858
85	The Stone of the Wise Man	De Vises Steen	December 1858
86	The Wind Tells about Valdemar Daae and His Daughters	Vinden fortæller om Valdemar Daae og hans Døttre	24 March 1859
87	The Girl Who Trod on the Loaf	Pigen, som traadte paa Brødet	24 March 1859
88	Ole, the Tower Keeper	Taarnvægteren Ole	24 March 1859
89	Anne Lisbeth	Anne Lisbeth	24 March 1859
90	Children's Prattle	Børnesnak	24 March 1859
91	The Child in the Grave	Barnet i Graven	December 1859
92	Pen and Inkstand	Pen og Blækhuus	9 December 1859
93	The Farmyard Cock and the Weathercock	Gaardhanen og Veirhanen	9 December 1859
94	"Beautiful"	"Deilig!"	9 December 1859
95	A Story from the Sand Dunes	En Historie fra Klitterne	9 December 1859
96	Two Brothers	To Brødre	25 December 1859
97	Moving Day	Flyttedagen	12 February 1860
98	The Butterfly	Sommerfuglen	December 1860
99	The Bishop of Börglum and his Men	Bispen paa Børglum og hans Frænde	27 January 1861
100	Twelve by the Mail	Tolv med Posten	2 March 1861
101	The Beetle	Skarnbassen	2 March 1861
102	What the Old Man Does is Always Right	Hvad Fatter gjør, det er altid det Rigtige	2 March 1861
103	The Snow Man	Sneemanden	2 March 1861
104	In the Duck Yard	I Andegaarden	2 March 1861
105	The New Century's Goddess	Det nye Aarhundredes Musa	2 March 1861
106	The Ice Maiden	Iisjomfruen	25 November 1861
107	The Psyche	Psychen	25 November 1861
108	The Snail and the Rosebush	Sneglen og Rosenhækken	25 November 1861
109	The Old Church Bell	Den gamle Kirkeklokke	1861
110	The Silver Shilling	Sølvskillingen	December 1861
111	The Metal Pig	Metalsvinet	30 April 1842
112	The Bond of Friendship	Venskabs-Pagten	30 April 1842
113	A Rose from Homer's Grave	En Rose fra Homers Grav	30 April 1842
114	A Story	En Historie	19 May 1851
115	The Silent Book	Den stumme Bog	19 May 1851
116	The Snowdrop	Sommergjækken	December 1862
117	The Teapot	Theepotten	December 1863
118	The Bird of Folklore	Folkesangens Fugl	December 1864
119	The Will-o'-the-Wisps Are in Town	Lygtemændene ere i Byen, sagde Mosekonen	17 November 1865
120	The Windmill	Veirmøllen	17 November 1865
121	In the Children's Room	I Børnestuen	17 November 1865
122	Golden Treasure	Guldskat	17 November 1865
123	The Storm Shifts the Signboards	Stormen flytter Skilt	17 November 1865
124	Kept Secret but not Forgotten	Gjemt er ikke glemt	11 December 1866
125	The Porter's Son	Portnerens Søn	11 December 1866
126	Aunty	Moster	11 December 1866
127	The Toad	Skrubtudsen	11 December 1866
128	Vänö and Glänö	Vænø og Glænø	18 August 1867
129	The Little Green Ones	De smaa Grønne	December 1867
130	The Goblin and the Woman	Nissen og Madamen	December 1867
131	Peiter, Peter, and Peer	Peiter, Peter og Peer	12 January 1868
132	Godfather's Picture Book	Gudfaders Billedbog	19 January 1868
133	Which Was the Happiest?	Hvem var den Lykkeligste?	26 July 1868
134	The Puppet-show Man	Marionetspilleren	19 May 1851
135	The Days of the Week	Ugedagene	November 1868
136	The Dryad	Dryaden	5 December 1868
137	The Rags	Laserne	December 1868
138	The Comet	Kometen	June 1869
139	Sunshine Stories	Solskins-Historier	May 1869
140	Chicken Grethe's Family	Hønse-Grethes Familie	December 1869
141	What Happened to the Thistle	Hvad Tidselen oplevede	October 1869
142	What One Can Invent	Hvad man kan hitte paa	July 1869
143	Luck May Lie in a Pin	Lykken kan ligge i en Pind	April 1869
144	What the Whole Family Said	Hvad hele Familien sagde	1 July 1870
145	Great-Grandfather	Oldefa'er	August 1870
146	The Most Incredible Thing	Det Utroligste	September 1870
147	The Candles	Lysene	July 1870
148	The Carrot Wedding	"Spørg Amagermo'er"!	1 October 1871
149	Dance, Dance, Doll of Mine!	"Dandse, dandse Dukke min!"	15 November 1871
150	The Great Sea Serpent	Den store Søslange	17 December 1871
151	The Gardener and the Noble Family	Gartneren og Herskabet	30 March 1872
152	What Old Johanne Told	Hvad gamle Johanne fortalte	23 November 1872
153	The Gate Key	Portnøglen	23 November 1872
154	The Cripple	Krøblingen	23 November 1872
155	Aunty Toothache	Tante Tandpine	23 November 1872
156	The Flea and the Professor	Loppen og Professoren	December 1872

==== Other fairy tales and stories ====
- "The Tallow Candle", or "The Candlestick" ("Tællelyset") (1820s)
- "The Ghost at Palnatoke's Grave" ("Gjenfærdet ved Palnatokes Grav") (1822), as Villiam Christian Walter
- "God Can Never Die" ("Den gamle Gud lever endnu") (1836)
- "This Fable is Intended for You" ("Det er Dig, Fabelen sigter til!") (1836)
- "The Talisman" ("Talismanen") (1836)
- "The Little Mermaid" ("Den lille havfrue") (1837)
- "The Emperor's New Clothes" ("Kejserens nye klæder") (1837)
- "The Wild Swans" ("De vilde svaner") (1838)
- "The Steadfast Tin Soldier" ("Den standhaftige tinsoldat") (1838)
- "The Daisy" ("Gaaseurten") (1838)
- "The Galoshes of Fortune" ("Lykkens Kalosker") (1838)
- "The Flying Trunk" ("Den flyvende Kuffert") (1839)
- "The Garden of Paradise" ("Paradisets have") (1839)
- "The Rose Elf" ("Rosen-Alfen") (1839)
- "The Storks" ("Storkene") (1839)
- "The Wicked Prince" ("Den onde Fyrste") (1840)
- "The Buckwheat" ("Boghveden") (1841)
- "Ole Lukoie" ("Ole Lukøje") (1841)
- "The Swineherd" ("Svinedrengen") (1841)
- "A Rose from Homer's Grave" ("En Rose fra Homers Grav") (1842)
- "The Metal Pig" ("Metalsvinet") (1842)
- "The Bond of Friendship" ("Venskabs-Pagten") (1842)
- "The Ugly Duckling" ("Den grimme ælling") (1843)
- "The Angel" ("Engelen") (1843)
- "The Sweethearts; or, The Top and the Ball" ("Kjærestefolkene [Toppen og bolden]") (1843)
- "The Nightingale" ("Nattergalen") (1843)
- "The Fir-Tree" ("Grantræet") (1844)
- "The Elder-Tree Mother" ("Hyldemoer") (1844)
- "The Snow Queen" ("Snedronningen") (1844)
- "Grandmother" ("Bedstemoder") (1845)
- "The Red Shoes" ("De røde Skoe") (1845)
- "The Little Match Girl" ("Den lille Pige med Svovlstikkerne") (1845)
- "The Elf Mound" ("Elverhøi") (1845)
- "Holger Danske" (1845)
- "The Shepherdess and the Chimney Sweep" ("Hyrdinden og Skorstensfejeren") (1845)
- "The Bell" ("Klokken") (1845)
- "The Jumpers" ("Springfyrene") (1845)
- "The Darning Needle" ("Stoppenaalen") (1845)
- "A Picture from the Ramparts" ("Et Billede fra Castelsvolden") (1846)
- "A View from Vartou's Window" ("Fra et Vindue i Vartou") (1846)
- "The Old Street Lamp" ("Den gamle Gadeløgte") (1847)
- "The Happy Family" ("Den lykkelige Familie") (1847)
- "The Old House" ("Det gamle Huus") (1847)
- "The Shirt Collar" ("Flipperne") (1847)
- "The Story of a Mother" ("Historien om en moder") (1847)
- "Little Tuk" ("Lille Tuk") (1847)
- "The Neighbouring Families" ("Nabofamilierne") (1847)
- "The Shadow" ("Skyggen") (1847)
- "The Drop of Water" ("Vanddraaben") (1847)
- "The Flax" ("Hørren") (1848)
- "The Phoenix Bird" ("Fugl Phønix") (1850)
- "The Silent Book" ("Den stumme Bog") (1851)
- "There is a Difference" ("'Der er Forskjel'") (1851)
- "A Story" ("En Historie") (1851)
- "The Puppet-show Man" ("Marionetspilleren") (1851)
- "The World's Fairest Rose" ("Verdens deiligste Rose") (1851)
- "The Story of the Year" ("Aarets Historie") (1852)
- "Everything in its Proper Place" ("'Alt paa sin rette Plads!'") (1852)
- "The Old Tombstone" ("Den gamle Gravsteen") (1852)
- "It's Quite True" ("Det er ganske vist!") (1852)
- "A Good Humour" ("Et godt Humeur") (1852)
- "Peas from a Pod" ("Fem fra en Ærtebælg") (1852)
- "Heartache" ("Hjertesorg") (1852)
- "She Was Good for Nothing" ("'Hun duede ikke'") (1852)
- "The Goblin and the Grocer" ("Nissen hos Spekhøkeren") (1852)
- "Thousands of Years from Now" ("Om Aartusinder") (1852)
- "On Judgement Day" ("Paa den yderste Dag") (1852)
- "The Swan's Nest" ("Svanereden") (1852)
- "Under The Willow Tree" ("Under Piletræet") (1852)
- "The Last Pearl" ("Den sidste Perle") (1853)
- "A Leaf from Heaven" ("Et Blad fra Himlen") (1853)
- "Two Maidens" ("To Jomfruer") (1853)
- "The Money Pig" ("Pengegrisen") (1854)
- "At the Uttermost Parts of the Sea" ("Ved det yderste Hav") (1854)
- "The Thorny Road of Honor" ("'Ærens Tornevei'") (1855)
- "Ib and Little Christine" ("Ib og lille Christine") (1855)
- "The Jewish Girl" ("Jødepigen") (1855)
- "Blockhead Hans", or "Clumsy Hans", or "Silly Hans", or "Jack the Dullard" ("Klods-Hans") (1855)
- "A String of Pearls" ("Et stykke Perlesnor") (1856)
- "The Bell Deep" ("Klokkedybet") (1856)
- "The Bottle Neck" ("Flaskehalsen") (1857)
- "The A-B-C Book" ("ABC-Bogen") (1858)
- "The Philosopher's Stone", or "The Stone of the Wise Man" ("De Vises Steen") (1858)
- "The Old Oak Tree's Last Dream", or "The Last Dream of the Old Oak" ("Det gamle Egetræes sidste Drøm") (1858)
- "The Marsh King's Daughter" ("Dynd-Kongens Datter") (1858)
- "The Racers" ("Hurtigløberne") (1858)
- "Something" ("'Noget'") (1858)
- "The Nightcap of the 'Pebersvend'" ("Pebersvendens Nathue") (1858)
- "Soup on a Sausage Peg" ("Suppe paa en Pølsepind") (1858)
- "Anne Lisbeth" (1859)
- "The Child in the Grave" ("Barnet i Graven") (1859)
- "Children's Prattle" ("Børnesnak") (1859)
- "'Beautiful'" ("'Deilig!'") (1859)
- "A Story from the Sand Dunes" ("En Historie fra Klitterne") (1859)
- "The Farmyard Cock and the Weathercock" ("Gaardhanen og Veirhanen") (1859)
- "Pen and Inkstand" ("Pen og Blækhuus") (1859)
- "The Girl Who Trod on the Loaf" ("Pigen, som traadte paa Brødet") (1859)
- "Ole, the Tower Keeper" ("Taarnvægteren Ole") (1859)
- "Two Brothers" ("To Brødre") (1859)
- "The Wind Tells about Valdemar Daae and His Daughters" ("Vinden fortæller om Valdemar Daae og hans Døttre") (1859)
- "Moving Day" ("Flyttedagen") (1860)
- "The Butterfly" ("Sommerfuglen") (1860)
- "The Bishop of Börglum and his Men" ("Bispen paa Børglum og hans Frænde") (1861)
- "The Old Church Bell" ("Den gamle Kirkeklokke") (1861)
- "The New Century's Goddess" ("Det nye Aarhundredes Musa") (1861)
- "What the Old Man Does is Always Right" ("Hvad Fatter gjør, det er altid det Rigtige") (1861)
- "In the Duck Yard" ("I Andegaarden") (1861)
- "The Ice-Maiden" ("Iisjomfruen") (1861)
- "The Psyche" ("Psychen") (1861)
- "The Beetle" ("Skarnbassen") (1861)
- "The Snowman" ("Sneemanden") (1861)
- "The Snail and the Rosebush" ("Sneglen og Rosenhækken") (1861)
- "The Silver Shilling" ("Sølvskillingen") (1861)
- "Twelve by the Mail" ("Tolv med Posten") (1861)
- "The Snowdrop" ("Sommergjækken") (1862)
- "The Teapot" ("Theepotten") (1863)
- "The Bird of Folklore" ("Folkesangens Fugl") (1864)
- "Golden Treasure" ("Guldskat") (1865)
- "In the Children's Room" ("I Børnestuen") (1865)
- "The Will-o'-the-Wisps are in Town", or "The Will-o'-the-Wisps are in Town, Says the Moor-woman" ("Lygtemændene ere i Byen, sagde Mosekonen") (1865)
- "The Storm Shifts the Signboards" ("Stormen flytter Skilt") (1865)
- "The Windmill" ("Veirmøllen") (1865)
- "Kept Secret but not Forgotten" ("Gjemt er ikke glemt") (1866)
- "Aunty" ("Moster") (1866)
- "The Porter's Son" ("Portnerens Søn") (1866)
- "The Toad" ("Skrubtudsen") (1866)
- "The Little Green Ones" ("De smaa Grønne") (1867)
- "The Goblin and the Woman" ("Nissen og Madamen") (1867)
- "Vänö and Glänö" ("Vænø og Glænø") (1867)
- "The Dryad" ("Dryaden") (1868)
- "Godfather's Picture Book" ("Gudfaders Billedbog") (1868)
- "Which Was the Happiest?" ("Hvem var den Lykkeligste?") (1868)
- "The Rags" ("Laserne") (1868)
- "Peiter, Peter, and Peer" ("Peiter, Peter og Peer") (1868)
- "The Days of the Week" ("Ugedagene") (1868)
- "The Court Cards" ("Herrebladene") (1869)
- "Chicken Grethe's Family" ("Hønse-Grethes Familie") (1869)
- "What One Can Invent" ("Hvad man kan hitte paa") (1869)
- "What Happened to the Thistle" ("Hvad Tidselen oplevede") (1869)
- "The Comet" ("Kometen") (1869)
- "Luck May Lie in a Pin" ("Lykken kan ligge i en Pind") (1869)
- "Sunshine Stories" ("Solskins-Historier") (1869)
- "Danish Popular Legends" ("Danske Folkesagn") (1870)
- "The Most Incredible Thing" ("Det Utroligste") (1870)
- "What the Whole Family Said" ("Hvad hele Familien sagde") (1870)
- "The Candles" ("Lysene") (1870)
- "Great-Grandfather" ("Oldefa'er") (1870)
- "Dance, Dance, Doll of Mine!" ("'Dandse, dandse Dukke min!'") (1871)
- "The Great Sea Serpent" ("Den store Søslange") (1871)
- "The Carrot Wedding" ("'Spørg Amagermo'er!'") (1871)
- "The Gardener and the Noble Family" ("Gartneren og Herskabet") (1872)
- "What Old Johanne Told" ("Hvad gamle Johanne fortalte") (1872)
- "The Cripple" ("Krøblingen") (1872)
- "The Flea and the Professor" ("Loppen og Professoren") (1872)
- "The Gate Key" ("Portnøglen") (1872)
- "Croak!" ("Qvæk") (1872)
- "The Penman" ("Skriveren") (1872)
- "Aunty Toothache" ("Tante Tandpine") (1872)

==== Collections and uncollected short stories ====
Collections:

- First attempts (Ungdoms-Forsøg) (1822), as Villiam Christian Walter, collection of 1 play and 1 short story:
  "Gjenfærdet ved Palnatokes Grav", "Alfsol" (play)
- Fairy Tales Told for Children (Eventyr, fortalte for Børn) series:
  1. Fairy Tales Told for Children. First Collection. (Eventyr, fortalte for Børn. Første Samling.):
    1. Fairy Tales Told for Children. First Collection. First Booklet (Eventyr, fortalte for Børn. Første Samling. Første Hefte) (1835), C.A. Reitzel Publishers, collection of 4 short stories:
      "Fyrtøiet", "Lille Claus og store Claus", "Prinsessen paa Ærten", "Den lille Idas blomster"
    2. Fairy Tales Told for Children. First Collection. Second Booklet (Eventyr, fortalte for Børn. Første Samling. Andet Hefte) (1835), C.A. Reitzel Publishers, collection of 3 short stories:
      "Tommelise", "Den uartige Dreng", "Reisekammeraten"
    3. Fairy Tales Told for Children. First Collection. Third Booklet (Eventyr, fortalte for Børn. Første Samling. Tredie Hefte) (1837), C.A. Reitzel Publishers, collection of 2 short stories:
      "Den lille havfrue", "Kejserens nye klæder"
  2. Fairy Tales Told for Children. New Collection (Eventyr, fortalte for Børn. Ny Samling):
    1. Fairy Tales Told for Children. New Collection. First Booklet (Eventyr, fortalte for Børn. Ny Samling. Første Hefte) (1838), C.A. Reitzel Publisher, collection of 3 short stories:
      "Gaaseurten", "Den standhaftige tinsoldat", "De vilde svaner"
    2. Fairy Tales Told for Children. New Collection. Second Booklet (Eventyr, fortalte for Børn. Ny Samling. Andet Hefte) (1839), C.A. Reitzel Publisher, collection of 3 short stories:
      "Paradisets have", "Den flyvende Kuffert", "Storkene"
    3. Fairy Tales Told for Children. New Collection. Third Booklet (Eventyr, fortalte for Børn. Ny Samling. Tredie Hefte) (1841), C.A. Reitzel Publisher, collection of 4 short stories:
      "Ole Lukøje", "Rosen-Alfen", "Svinedrengen", "Boghveden"
- Smaahistorier (1836), collection of 3 short stories:
  "Den gamle Gud lever endnu", "Talismanen", "Det er Dig, Fabelen sigter til!"
- Three poetical works (Tre Digtninger) (1838), C.A. Reitzel Publishers, collection of 1 short story, 1 poem and 1 play:
  "Lykkens Kalosker", "En rigtig Soldat" (play), "Det har Zombien gjort" (poem)
- A Picture Book without Pictures (Billedbog uden Billeder) series:
  1. A Picture Book without Pictures (Billedbog uden Billeder) (1839), C.A. Reitzel Publishers, collection of 20 short stories from A Picture Book without Pictures series:
    "Første Aften" (#1), "Anden Aften" (#2), "Tredie Aften" (#3), "Fjerde Aften" (#4), "Femte Aften" (#5), "Sjette Aften" (#6), "Syvende Aften" (#7), "Ottende Aften" (#8), "Niende Aften" (#9), "Tiende Aften" (#10), "Ellevte Aften" (#11), "Tolvte Aften" (#12), "Trettende Aften" (#13), "Fjortende Aften" (#14), "Femtende Aften" (#15), "Sextende Aften" (#16), "Syttende Aften" (#17), "Attende Aften" (#18), "Nittende Aften" (#19), "Tyvende Aften" (#20)
  2. A Picture Book without Pictures. New Collection (Billedbog uden Billeder. Ny Samling) (1840), collection of 6 short stories from A Picture Book without Pictures series:
    "En og tyvende Aften" (#21), "Tre og tyvende Aften" (#23), "Sex og tyvende Aften" (#26), "Otte og tyvende Aften" (#28), "Ni og tyvende Aften" (#29), "Tredivte Aften" (#30)
  3. Tre nye Billeder af H.C. Andersen (1840), collection of 3 short stories from A Picture Book without Pictures series:
    "To og tyvende Aften" (#22), "Fem og tyvende Aften" (#25), "Syv og tyvende Aften" (#27)
  4. Picture Book without Pictures. Second Enhanced Edition (Billedbog uden Billeder. Anden forøgede Udgave) (1844), collection of 26 short stories from A Picture Book without Pictures series:
    "Første Aften" (#1), "Anden Aften" (#2), "Tredie Aften" (#3), "Fjerde Aften" (#4), "Femte Aften" (#5), "Sjette Aften" (#6), "Syvende Aften" (#7), "Ottende Aften" (#8), "Niende Aften" (#9), "Tiende Aften" (#10), "Ellevte Aften" (#11), "Tolvte Aften" (#12), "Trettende Aften" (#13), "Fjortende Aften" (#14), "Femtende Aften" (#15), "Sextende Aften" (#16), "Syttende Aften" (#17), "Attende Aften" (#18), "Nittende Aften" (#19), "Tyvende Aften" (#20), "En og tyvende Aften" (#21), "To og tyvende Aften" (#22), "Fire og tyvende Aften" (#24), "Fem og tyvende Aften" (#25), "Syv og tyvende Aften" (#27), "Een og tredivte Aften" (#31)
  5. Picture Book without Pictures. Full Version (Billedbog uden Billeder. Komplet udgave) (1847), collection of 33 short stories from A Picture Book without Pictures series:
    "Første Aften" (#1), "Anden Aften" (#2), "Tredie Aften" (#3), "Fjerde Aften" (#4), "Femte Aften" (#5), "Sjette Aften" (#6), "Syvende Aften" (#7), "Ottende Aften" (#8), "Niende Aften" (#9), "Tiende Aften" (#10), "Ellevte Aften" (#11), "Tolvte Aften" (#12), "Trettende Aften" (#13), "Fjortende Aften" (#14), "Femtende Aften" (#15), "Sextende Aften" (#16), "Syttende Aften" (#17), "Attende Aften" (#18), "Nittende Aften" (#19), "Tyvende Aften" (#20), "En og tyvende Aften" (#21), "To og tyvende Aften" (#22), "Tre og tyvende Aften" (#23), "Fire og tyvende Aften" (#24), "Fem og tyvende Aften" (#25), "Sex og tyvende Aften" (#26), "Syv og tyvende Aften" (#27), "Otte og tyvende Aften" (#28), "Ni og tyvende Aften" (#29), "Tredivte Aften" (#30), "Een og tredivte Aften" (#31), "To og tredivte Aften" (#32), "Tre og tredivte Aften" (#33)
- New Fairy Tales (Nye Eventyr) series:
  1. New Fairy Tales. First Volume (Nye Eventyr. Første Bind):
    1. New Fairy Tales. First Volume. First Collection (Nye Eventyr. Første Bind. Første Samling) (1843), C.A. Reitzel Publishers, collection of 4 short stories:
      "Engelen", "Nattergalen", "Kjærestefolkene [Toppen og bolden]", "Den grimme ælling"
    2. New Fairy Tales. First Volume. Second Collection (Nye Eventyr. Første Bind. Anden Samling) (1844), C.A. Reitzel Publishers, collection of 2 short stories:
      "Grantræet", "Snedronningen"
    3. New Fairy Tales. First Volume. Third Collection (Nye Eventyr. Første Bind. Tredie Samling) (1845), C.A. Reitzel Publishers, collection of 5 short stories:
      "Elverhøi", "De røde Skoe", "Springfyrene", "Hyrdinden og Skorstensfejeren", "Holger Danske"
  2. New Fairy Tales. Second Volume (Nye Eventyr. Andet Bind):
    1. New Fairy Tales. Second Volume. First Collection (Nye Eventyr. Andet Bind. Første Samling) (1847), C.A. Reitzel Publishers, collection of 5 short stories:
      "Den gamle Gadeløgte", "Nabofamilierne", "Stoppenaalen", "Lille Tuk", "Skyggen"
    2. New Fairy Tales. Second Volume. Second Collection (Nye Eventyr. Andet Bind. Anden Samling) (1848), C.A. Reitzel Publishers, collection of 6 short stories:
      "Det gamle Huus", "Vanddraaben", "Den lille Pige med Svovlstikkerne", "Den lykkelige Familie", "Historien om en moder", "Flipperne"
- To Billeder fra Kjøbenhavn (1846), collection of 2 short stories:
  "Fra et Vindue i Vartou", "Et Billede fra Castelsvolden"
- Fortællinger og Digte af H. C. Andersen (1847), collection of 2 short stories and 2 poems:
  "To og tredivte Aften" (A Picture Book without Pictures series #32), "Pigen fra Albano (Madonna! jeg næppe af glæde kan tale,)" (poem), "Tre og tredivte Aften" (A Picture Book without Pictures series #33), "Romance (Langt, langt fra hjemmets kyst)" (poem)
- Fairy-tales (Eventyr) (1849), C.A. Reitzel Publishers, collection of 43 short stories:
  "Lille Tuk", "Grantræet", "Svinedrengen", "Kjærestefolkene [Toppen og bolden]", "Hyldemoer", "Elverhøi", "Snedronningen", "Holger Danske", "Ole Lukøje", "Tommelise", "Lille Claus og store Claus", "Den standhaftige tinsoldat", "Boghveden", "Den lille havfrue", "Den uartige Dreng", "Paradisets have", "Gaaseurten", "Den grimme ælling", "Storkene", "Engelen", "Hyrdinden og Skorstensfejeren", "Prinsessen paa Ærten", "Fyrtøiet", "De røde Skoe", "Reisekammeraten", "Springfyrene", "Nattergalen", "Rosen-Alfen", "Den flyvende Kuffert", "Den gamle Gadeløgte", "Den lille Pige med Svovlstikkerne", "De vilde svaner", "Den lille Idas blomster", "Nabofamilierne", "Klokken", "Stoppenaalen", "Skyggen", "Det gamle Huus", "Hørren", "Vanddraaben", "Den lykkelige Familie", "Historien om en moder", "Flipperne"
- Stories (Historier) series:
  1. Stories. First Collection (Historier. Første Samling) (1852), C.A. Reitzel Publishers, collection of 7 short stories:
    "Aarets Historie", "Verdens deiligste Rose", "Et Billede fra Castelsvolden", "Paa den yderste Dag", "Det er ganske vist!", "Svanereden", "Et godt Humeur"
  2. Stories. Second Collection (Historier. Anden Samling) (1852), C.A. Reitzel Publishers, collection of 5 short stories:
    "Hjertesorg", "'Alt paa sin rette Plads!'", "Nissen hos Spekhøkeren", "Om Aartusinder", "Under Piletræet"
- Stories (Historier) (1855), collection of 22 short stories:
  "Ib og lille Christine", "Klods-Hans", "Fra et Vindue i Vartou", "Den gamle Gravsteen", "Fem fra en Ærtebælg", "'Hun duede ikke'", "Pengegrisen", "Ved det yderste Hav", "To Jomfruer", "'Der er Forskjel'", "Aarets Historie", "Verdens deiligste Rose", "Et Billede fra Castelsvolden", "Paa den yderste Dag", "Det er ganske vist!", "Svanereden", "Et godt Humeur", "Hjertesorg", "'Alt paa sin rette Plads!'", "Nissen hos Spekhøkeren", "Om Aartusinder", "Under Piletræet"
- New Fairy Tales and Stories (Nye Eventyr og Historier) series:
  1. New Fairy Tales and Stories. First Series (Nye Eventyr og Historier. Første Række):
    1. New Fairy Tales and Stories. First Series. First Collection (Nye Eventyr og Historier. Første Række. Første Samling) (1858), the estate and heirs of C.A. Reitzel, collection of 6 short stories:
      "Suppe paa en Pølsepind", "Flaskehalsen", "Pebersvendens Nathue", "'Noget'", "Det gamle Egetræes sidste Drøm", "ABC-Bogen"
    2. New Fairy Tales and Stories. First Series. Second Collection (Nye Eventyr og Historier. Første Række. Anden Samling) (1858), the estate and heirs of C.A. Reitzel, collection of 3 short stories:
      "Dynd-Kongens Datter", "Hurtigløberne", "Klokkedybet"
    3. New Fairy Tales and Stories. First Series. Third Collection (Nye Eventyr og Historier. Første Række. Tredie Samling) (1859), C.A. Reitzel Publishers, collection of 6 short stories:
      "Vinden fortæller om Valdemar Daae og hans Døttre", "Pigen, som traadte paa Brødet", "Taarnvægteren Ole", "Anne Lisbeth", "Børnesnak", "Et stykke Perlesnor"
    4. New Fairy Tales and Stories. First Series. Fourth Collection (Nye Eventyr og Historier. Første Række. Fjerde Samling) (1859), C.A. Reitzel Publishers, collection of 5 short stories:
      "Pen og Blækhuus", "Barnet i Graven", "Gaardhanen og Veirhanen", "'Deilig!'", "En Historie fra Klitterne"
  2. New Fairy Tales and Stories. Second Series (Nye Eventyr og Historier. Anden Række):
    1. New Fairy Tales and Stories. Second Series. First Collection (Nye Eventyr og Historier. Anden Række. Første Samling) (1861), C.A. Reitzel Publishers, collection of 7 short stories:
      "Tolv med Posten", "Skarnbassen", "Hvad Fatter gjør, det er altid det Rigtige", "De Vises Steen", "Sneemanden", "I Andegaarden", "Det nye Aarhundredes Musa"
    2. New Fairy Tales and Stories. Second Series. Second Collection (Nye Eventyr og Historier. Anden Række. Anden Samling) (1861), C.A. Reitzel Publishers, collection of 4 short stories:
      "Iisjomfruen", "Sommerfuglen", "Psychen", "Sneglen og Rosenhækken"
    3. New Fairy Tales and Stories. Second Series. Third Collection (Nye Eventyr og Historier. Anden Række. Tredie Samling) (1865), C.A. Reitzel Publishers, collection of 7 short stories:
      "Lygtemændene ere i Byen, sagde Mosekonen", "Veirmøllen", "Sølvskillingen", "Bispen paa Børglum og hans Frænde", "I Børnestuen", "Guldskat", "Stormen flytter Skilt"
    4. New Fairy Tales and Stories. Second Series. Fourth Collection (Nye Eventyr og Historier. Anden Række. Fjerde Samling) (1866), C.A. Reitzel Publishers, collection of 6 short stories:
      "Gjemt er ikke glemt", "Portnerens Søn", "Flyttedagen", "Sommergjækken", "Moster", "Skrubtudsen"
  3. New Fairy Tales and Stories. Third Series (Nye Eventyr og Historier. Tredie Række):
    1. New Fairy Tales and Stories. Third Series. New [first] Collection (Nye Eventyr og Historier. Tredie Række. Ny [første] Samling) (1872), collection of 13 short stories:
      "Gartneren og Herskabet", "Den store Søslange", "'Spørg Amagermo'er!'", "'Dandse, dandse Dukke min!'", "Hvad hele Familien sagde", "Det Utroligste", "Lysene", "Hvem var den Lykkeligste?", "Oldefa'er", "Solskins-Historier", "Ugedagene", "Kometen", "Lykken kan ligge i en Pind"
    2. New Fairy Tales and Stories. Third Series. Second Collection (Nye Eventyr og Historier. Tredie Række. Anden Samling) (1872), C.A. Reitzel Publishers, collection of 4 short stories:
      "Tante Tandpine", "Krøblingen", "Portnøglen", "Hvad gamle Johanne fortalte"
- Fairy Tales and Stories (Eventyr og Historier) series:
  1. Fairy Tales and Stories. First Volume (Eventyr og Historier. Første Bind) (1862), collection of 27 short stories:
    "Grantræet", "Fyrtøiet", "Lille Claus og store Claus", "Prinsessen paa Ærten", "Den lille Idas blomster", "Tommelise", "Den uartige Dreng", "Reisekammeraten", "Den lille havfrue", "Gaaseurten", "Den standhaftige tinsoldat", "De vilde svaner", "Paradisets have", "Den flyvende Kuffert", "Storkene", "Metalsvinet", "Venskabs-Pagten", "En Rose fra Homers Grav", "Ole Lukøje", "Rosen-Alfen", "Svinedrengen", "Boghveden", "Engelen", "Nattergalen", "Kjærestefolkene [Toppen og bolden]", "Den grimme ælling", "Snedronningen"
  2. Fairy Tales and Stories. Second Volume (Eventyr og Historier. Andet Bind) (1863), collection of 48 short stories and 1 article:
    "Bedstemoder", "Lille Tuk", "Fugl Phønix", "Hyldemoer", "Stoppenaalen", "Klokken", "Elverhøi", "De røde Skoe", "Springfyrene", "Hyrdinden og Skorstensfejeren", "Holger Danske", "Den lille Pige med Svovlstikkerne", "Et Billede fra Castelsvolden", "Den gamle Gadeløgte", "Nabofamilierne", "Skyggen", "Det gamle Huus", "Vanddraaben", "Den lykkelige Familie", "Historien om en moder", "Flipperne", "Hørren", "En Historie", "Den stumme Bog", "'Der er Forskjel'", "Den gamle Gravsteen", "Verdens deiligste Rose", "Aarets Historie", "Paa den yderste Dag", "Det er ganske vist!", "Svanereden", "Et godt Humeur", "Hjertesorg", "'Alt paa sin rette Plads!'", "Nissen hos Spekhøkeren", "Om Aartusinder", "Under Piletræet", "Fem fra en Ærtebælg", "Klods-Hans", "'Hun duede ikke'", "Ib og lille Christine", "To Jomfruer", "Ved det yderste Hav", "Pengegrisen", "'Ærens Tornevei'", "Jødepigen", "Flaskehalsen", "De Vises Steen", "Bemærkninger" (article)
  3. Fairy Tales and Stories. Third Volume (Eventyr og Historier. Tredie Bind) (1870), collection of 24 short stories:
    "Suppe paa en Pølsepind", "Pebersvendens Nathue", "'Noget'", "Det gamle Egetræes sidste Drøm", "ABC-Bogen", "Dynd-Kongens Datter", "Hurtigløberne", "Klokkedybet", "Den onde Fyrste", "Vinden fortæller om Valdemar Daae og hans Døttre", "Pigen, som traadte paa Brødet", "Taarnvægteren Ole", "Anne Lisbeth", "Børnesnak", "Et stykke Perlesnor", "Pen og Blækhuus", "Barnet i Graven", "Gaardhanen og Veirhanen", "'Deilig!'", "En Historie fra Klitterne", "Marionetspilleren", "To Brødre", "Den gamle Kirkeklokke", "Tolv med Posten"
  4. Fairy Tales and Stories. Fourth Volume (Eventyr og Historier. Fjerde Bind) (1871), collection of 27 short stories:
    "Skarnbassen", "Hvad Fatter gjør, det er altid det Rigtige", "Sneemanden", "I Andegaarden", "Det nye Aarhundredes Musa", "Iisjomfruen", "Sommerfuglen", "Psychen", "Sneglen og Rosenhækken", "Lygtemændene ere i Byen, sagde Mosekonen", "Veirmøllen", "Sølvskillingen", "Bispen paa Børglum og hans Frænde", "I Børnestuen", "Guldskat", "Stormen flytter Skilt", "Theepotten", "Folkesangens Fugl", "De smaa Grønne", "Nissen og Madamen", "Peiter, Peter og Peer", "Gjemt er ikke glemt", "Portnerens Søn", "Flyttedagen", "Sommergjækken", "Moster", "Skrubtudsen"
  5. Fairy Tales and Stories. Fifth Volume (Eventyr og Historier. Femte Bind) (1874), collection of 25 short stories and 1 article:
    "Bemærkninger til Eventyr og Historier" (article), "Gudfaders Billedbog", "Laserne", "Vænø og Glænø", "Hvem var den Lykkeligste?", "Dryaden", "Hønse-Grethes Familie", "Hvad Tidselen oplevede", "Hvad man kan hitte paa", "Lykken kan ligge i en Pind", "Kometen", "Ugedagene", "Solskins-Historier", "Oldefa'er", "Lysene", "Det Utroligste", "Hvad hele Familien sagde", "'Dandse, dandse Dukke min!'", "'Spørg Amagermo'er!'", "Den store Søslange", "Gartneren og Herskabet", "Loppen og Professoren", "Hvad gamle Johanne fortalte", "Portnøglen", "Krøblingen", "Tante Tandpine"
- Fifteen Fairy Tales and Stories (Femten Eventyr og Historier) (1867), C.A. Reitzel Publishers, collection of 15 short stories:
  "Tolv med Posten", "Barnet i Graven", "Suppe paa en Pølsepind", "Anne Lisbeth", "'Noget'", "Hurtigløberne", "Pebersvendens Nathue", "ABC-Bogen", "Sneemanden", "Klokkedybet", "Skarnbassen", "Psychen", "Hvad Fatter gjør, det er altid det Rigtige", "Børnesnak", "Pen og Blækhuus"
- Three new Fairy Tales and Stories (Tre nye Eventyr og Historier) (1869), C.A. Reitzel Publishers, collection of 3 short stories:
  "Hønse-Grethes Familie", "Hvad Tidselen oplevede", "Hvad man kan hitte paa"
- Fairy Tales and Stories. New Collection (Eventyr og Historier. Ny Samling) (1872), C.A. Reitzel Publishers, collection of 12 short stories:
  "Kometen", "Ugedagene", "Solskins-Historier", "Oldefa'er", "Hvem var den Lykkeligste?", "Lysene", "Det Utroligste", "Hvad hele Familien sagde", "'Dandse, dandse Dukke min!'", "'Spørg Amagermo'er!'", "Den store Søslange", "Gartneren og Herskabet"
- To ukendte Eventyr af H. C. Andersen (1926), published posthumously, collection of 2 short stories:
  "Qvæk", "Skriveren"

Uncollected short stories:

- "The Tallow Candle", or "The Candlestick" ("Tællelyset") (1820s)
- "The Last Pearl" ("Den sidste Perle") (1853)
- "A Leaf from Heaven" ("Et Blad fra Himlen") (1853)
- "The Court Cards" ("Herrebladene") (1869)
- "Danish Popular Legends" ("Danske Folkesagn") (1870)
- "Den første Aften" (1943), published posthumously, A Picture Book without Pictures series #34

=== Poems ===
- Skjærmbræts-Billeder (1829), collection of 5 poems
- Poems (Digte) (1830), collection of 47 poems
- Prøve af 'Phantasier og Skizzer' (1830), collection of 3 poems
- Tre Smaae-Digte (1830), collection of 3 poems
- Tvende Smaadigte (1830), collection of 2 poems
- Deviser med Presenterne paa et Juletræe (1831), collection of 7 poems
- Phantasies and sketches (Phantasier og Skizzer) (1831), collection of 50 poems
- Poetiske Penneprøver (1831), collection of 6 poems
- Vignettes for Danish poets (Vignetter til danske Digtere) (1831), C.A. Reitzel Publishers, collection of 67 poems
- Poetiske Bagateller (1832), collection of 6 poems
- The twelve months of the year drawn in ink (Aarets tolv Maaneder, Tegnede med Blæk og Pen) (1832), C.A. Reitzel Publishers, collection of 12 poems
- Collected poems (Samlede Digte) (1833), C.A. Reitzel Publishers, collection of 68 poems
- Smaae-Digte (1833), collection of 7 poems
- Digte af H. C. Andersen series:
  1. Digte af H. C. Andersen I (1834), collection of 3 poems
  2. Digte af H. C. Andersen II (1835), collection of 5 poems
  3. Digte af H. C. Andersen III (1836), collection of 2 poems
  4. Digte af H. C. Andersen IV (1844), collection of 5 poems
  5. Digte af H. C. Andersen V (1844), collection of 4 poems
  6. Digte af H. C. Andersen VI (1862), collection of 4 poems
- Smaa-Digte af H. C. Andersen (1835), collection of 2 poems
- Sange ved det Søsterlige Velgjørenheds Selskabs høitidelige Forsamling i Anledning af Hendes Majestæt Dronning Maria Sophia Frederikas høie Fødselsdag den 28de October 1838 (1838), collection of 2 songs
- Smaavers af H. C. Andersen series:
  1. Smaavers af H. C. Andersen I (1840), collection of 3 poems
  2. Smaavers af H. C. Andersen II (1844), collection of 5 poems
  3. Smaavers af H. C. Andersen III (1867), collection of 4 poems
  4. Smaavers af H. C. Andersen IV (1872), collection of 2 poems
- Sange af Vaudevillen: 'Fuglen i Pæretræet' (1844), collection of 6 poems
- Poems old and new (Digte, gamle og nye) (1846), C.A. Reitzel Publishers, collection of 92 poems
- 6 character studies composed for pianoforte (6 Characteerstykker componerede som Studier for Pianoforte) (1849), C.C. Lose & Delbanco, Copenhagen, book of 6 sheet music with poems
- Indledende Smaavers series:
  1. 6 indledende Smaavers (1849), collection of 6 poems
  2. 6 indledende Smaavers II (1850), collection of 6 poems
- A Christmas greeting for adults and children from Danish composers (Julehilsen til Store og Smaae fra danske Componister) (1850), C.C. Lose & Delbanco, Copenhagen, book of 6 sheet music with poems
- Patriotic verses and songs from the War (Fædrelandske Vers og Sange under Krigen) (1851), collection of 14 poems
- Indledende Smaavers (1855), collection of 6 poems
- Six short pieces for pianoforte (Novellette i sex Smaastykker for Pianoforte) (1855), C.C. Lose & Delbanco, book of 6 sheet music with poems
- Digte fra Spanien (1863), collection of 6 poems
- 6 Smaarim (1866), collection of 6 poems
- Photographs of groups of children (Fotograferede Børnegrupper) (1866), book of 6 photographs with poems
- Well-known and forgotten poems (Kjendte og glemte Digte) (1867), C.A. Reitzel Publishers, collection of 42 poems
- To Digte af H. C. Andersen (1875), collection of 2 poems, published posthumously
- Tre utrykte Digte af H. C. Andersen (1878), collection of 3 poems, published posthumously
- Tre ufuldførte historiske Digtninge (1955), collection of 3 poems, published posthumously

=== Plays ===
- Røverne i Vissenbjerg i Fyen (1822)
- Love in Nicolai Tower or What says the pit (Kjærlighed paa Nicolai Taarn eller Hvad siger Parterret) (1829), C.A. Reitzel Publishers, Copenhagen
- Fornuftgiftermaalet Nr. 2. En Dramatisk Drøm paa Skagens Rev (1831)
- The ship (Skibet) (1831), C.A. Reitzel Publishers
- The bride of Lammermoor (Bruden fra Lammermoor) (1832), opera
- The raven or the fraternal test (Ravnen eller Broderprøven) (1832), Schubothske Boghandel, Copenhagen, opera
- Agnete and the Merman (Agnete og Havmanden) (1833)
- The queen of 16 (Dronningen paa 16 Aar) (1833)
- Songs from the party at Kenilworth (Sangene i Festen paa Kenilworth) (1836), C.A. Reitzel Publishers, opera
- Parting and meeting. Original drama in two parts. First part: The Spaniards in Odense. Vaudeville in one act. Second part: Twenty-five years later. Vaudeville in one act (Skilles og mødes. Original dramatisk Digtning i to Afdelinger. Første Afdeling: Spanierne i Odense. Vaudeville i een Act. Anden Afdeling: Fem og tyve Aar derefter. Vaudeville i een Act) (1836), Schubothe Publishers
- The invisible person on Sprogø (Den Usynlige paa Sprogø) (1839), Schubothes Boghandling
- An open-air comedy; vaudeville in one act based on the old ballad opera: "Actor against his Will" (En Comedie i det Grønne, Vaudeville i een Akt efter det gamle Lystspil: "Skuespilleren imod sin Villie") (1840)
- The Moorish Girl (Maurerpigen) (1840)
- Mikkels Kjærligheds Historier i Paris (1840)
- The Mulatto (Mulatten) (1840)
- Vandring gjennem Opera-Galleriet (1841), opera
- The king dreams (Kongen drømmer) (1844)
- The flower of happiness (Lykkens Blomst) (1845), C.A. Reitzel Publishers
- Little Kirsten (Liden Kirsten) (1846), opera
- Ahasverus (1847), C.A. Reitzel Publishers
- The Dannevirke of art (Kunstens Dannevirke) (1848), C.A. Reitzel Publishers
- The wedding at Lake Como (Brylluppet ved Como-Søen) (1849), C.A. Reitzel Publishers, opera
- More than pearls and gold (Meer end Perler og Guld) (1849), C.A. Reitzel Publishers
- Den nye Barselstue (1850), C.A. Reitzel Publishers
- A night in Roskilde (En Nat i Roeskilde) (1850), C.A. Reitzel Publishers
- Ole Lukoie (Ole Lukøje) (1850), C.A. Reitzel Publishers
- The Elder Tree Mother (Hyldemoer) (1851), C.A. Reitzel Publishers
- The Nix (Nøkken) (1853), C.A. Reitzel Publishers, opera
- Fuglen i Pæretræet (1854)
- Indledning til Carnevalet (1854)
- A village story (En Landsbyhistorie) (1855), the estate and heirs of C.A. Reitzel
- He is not [nobly] born (Han er ikke født) (1864), C.A. Reitzel Publishers
- On Langebro (Paa Langebro) (1864), C.A. Reitzel Publishers
- When the Spaniards Were Here (Da Spanierne var her) (1865), C.A. Reitzel Publishers
- The Raven (Ravnen) (1865), C.A. Reitzel Publishers, opera
- Kong Saul (1867), opera
- I Vetturinens Vogn (1868)
- Festen paa Kenilworth (1876), published posthumously
- Intermediet til Holbergs: Kilderejsen (1883), published posthumously
- Hr. Rasmussen (1913), published posthumously
- Danmark (1937), published posthumously
- Truth (1940), published posthumously
- Sangerinden (1987), published posthumously
- I Maaneskin (2001), published posthumously
- Langebro (2001), published posthumously
- Souffleurens Benefice (2001), published posthumously
- En Ødeland (2003), published posthumously
- Skovcapellet (2004), published posthumously

=== Non-fiction ===
Articles

- "Til Kjøbenhavns-Postens Læsere, i Anledning af Herr XXX's Critik over: 'Kjærlighed paa Nicolai Taa'" (1829)
- "Et Stykke Kage til den lille XXX, for hans Ricochets mod Hr. Andersen af 'En Beundrer af XXX'" (1829)
- "Subscriptionsplan. Digte (1830)" (1829)
- "Subskriptionsplan til 'Phantasier og Skizzer'" (1830)
- "Uddrag af et Privatbrev fra Paris, dateret 11te Juni 1833" (1833)
- "Fortale til Agnete og Havmanden" (1833)
- "Fortale til Subskriptionsindbydelse paa 'Improvisatoren'" (1834)
- "Erklæring i Anledning af Kritik i A. P. Berggreens i 'Musikalsk Tidende', Nr. 7 af 'Poetisk Jydepotte' fremsagt ved Hr. Sahlertz" (1836)
- "Anmeldelse af H. C. Ørsteds Foredrag" (1839)
- "Fortale af H. C. Andersen, til 'Konstnerfamilien'" (1841)
- "De Svenske i Fyen i Sommeren 1848" (1848)
- "'Midsommar-Resan'. En Vall-Fart af Förf. til Teckningar ur hvardagslifvet" (1849)
- "Et Par Ord om 'Hyldemoer'" (1851)
- "Berigtigelse af en Fejl i 'Mit Livs Eventyr'" (1856)
- "Af et Brev fra London. (Juli 1857)" (1857)
- "Protest til Redacteur Ploug mod Clemens Petersens Anmeldelse i 'Fædrelandet' af af Carit Etlars Folkekomedie 'Hr. Lauge med den" (1861)
- "Brev fra Prof. H. C. Andersen, dateret Florents den 3 juni" (1861)
- "Brudstykke af et Brev fra Spanien" (1862)
- "Brudstykke af et Brev, dateret Valencia, den 18de September" (1862)
- "Brudstykke af et Brev dateret Granada den 12. Oktober" (1862)
- "Brudstykke af et Brev dateret Tanger den 3. November" (1862)
- "Brudstykke af et Brev dateret Madrid den 18. December" (1862)
- "Bemærkninger" (1863)
- "Uddrag af et Brev, dateret Leyden, den 17. Marts" (1866)
- "Af et Brev fra H. C. Andersen, dateret Lissabon, den 16. Mai" (1866)
- "Uddrag af et Brev, omhandlende Rejsen til Portugal" (1866)
- "Fra H. C. Andersens Reise. Brev dateret Setubal den 19de Juni 1866" (1866)
- "Brudstykke af et Brev dateret Cintra den 31. Juli" (1866)
- "Svarskrivelse til Odense Kommunalbestyrelse paa Indbydelsen til at komme til Odense den 6/12 for at modtage Diplomet som Æresbor" (1867)
- "Takketale ved Overrækkelsen af Diplomet" (1867)
- "Brev, dateret København d. 2den Januar 1867. (poetico for: 1868)" (1867)
- "Takskrivelse til Studenterforeningen" (1867)
- "Bemærkninger" (1868)
- "Et Brev fra Etatsraad H. C. Andersen til Udgiveren" (1869)
- "Brev dateret Rom, den 5te December 1833" (1870)
- "Brev dateret Kjøbenhavn, den 15de September 1836" (1870)
- "Uddrag af et Brev til Edmund W. Gosse" (1874)
- "H. C. Andersen og de amerikanske Børn" (1874)
- "Bemærkninger til Eventyr og Historier" (1874)
- "Til mine Landsmænd" (1875)
- "Brev, dateret: Kjøbenhavn, den 5te April 1875, til Redaktøren af 'Søndags-Posten'" (1875)
- "Et Curiosum fra 1822" (1875), published posthumously

Autobiographies

- The Fairy Tale of My Life (Mit eget Eventyr uden Digtning) (1847)
- The Fairy Tale of My Life (Mit Livs Eventyr) (1855)
- The Story of My Life (1871)
- H.C. Andersens Samlede Skrifter. Supplement til 'Mit Livs Eventyr' (1877), published posthumously

Biographies

- En Episode af Ole Bulls Liv (1839)
- Bertel Thorvaldsen. En biographisk Skizze (1844)
- Henriette Hanck (1845)
- Jens Adolph Jerichau og Elisabeth Jerichau, født Baumann (1853)
- Johan Peter Emilius Hartmann (1860)
- Digteren Bernhard Severin Ingemann (1862)

Essays

- Samlede Skrifter af H. C. Andersen series:
  1. Samlede Skrifter af H. C. Andersen. Første Bind (1853)
  2. Samlede Skrifter af H. C. Andersen. Andet Bind (1853)
  3. Samlede Skrifter af H. C. Andersen. Tredie Bind (1853)
  4. Samlede Skrifter af H. C. Andersen. Fjerde Bind (1853)
  5. Samlede Skrifter af H. C. Andersen. Femte Bind (1854)
  6. Samlede Skrifter af H. C. Andersen. Sjette Bind (1854)
  7. Samlede Skrifter af H. C. Andersen. Syvende Bind (1854)
  8. Samlede Skrifter af H. C. Andersen. Ottende Bind (1854)
  9. Samlede Skrifter af H. C. Andersen. Niende Bind (1854)
  10. Samlede Skrifter af H. C. Andersen. Tiende Bind (1854)
  11. Samlede Skrifter af H. C. Andersen. Ellevte Bind (1854)
  12. Samlede Skrifter af H. C. Andersen. Tolvte Bind (1854)
  13. Samlede Skrifter af H. C. Andersen. Trettende Bind (1854)
  14. Samlede Skrifter af H. C. Andersen. Fjortende Bind (1854)
  15. Samlede Skrifter af H. C. Andersen. Femtende Bind (1854)
  16. Samlede Skrifter af H. C. Andersen. Sextende Bind (1854)
  17. Samlede Skrifter af H. C. Andersen. Syttende Bind (1855)
  18. Samlede Skrifter af H. C. Andersen. Attende Bind (1855)
  19. Samlede Skrifter af H. C. Andersen. Nittende Bind (1855)
  20. Samlede Skrifter af H. C. Andersen. Tyvende Bind (1855)
  21. Samlede Skrifter af H. C. Andersen. Eet og Tyvende og To og Tyvende Bind (1855)
  22. Samlede Skrifter af H. C. Andersen. Tre og Tyvende Bind (1857)
  23. Samlede Skrifter af H. C. Andersen. Fire og Tyvende Bind (1863)
  24. Samlede Skrifter af H. C. Andersen. Fem og Tyvende Bind (1868)
  25. Samlede Skrifter af H. C. Andersen. Sex og Tyvende Bind (1868)
  26. Samlede Skrifter af H. C. Andersen. Syv og Tyvende Bind (1868)
  27. Samlede Skrifter af H. C. Andersen. Otte og Tyvende Bind (1868)
  28. Samlede Skrifter af H. C. Andersen. Ni og Tyvende Bind (1876), published posthumously
  29. Samlede Skrifter af H. C. Andersen. Tredivte Bind (1876), published posthumously
  30. Samlede Skrifter af H. C. Andersen. En og Tredivte Bind (1876), published posthumously
  31. Samlede Skrifter af H. C. Andersen. To og Tredivte Bind (1876), published posthumously
  32. Samlede Skrifter af H. C. Andersen. Tre og Tredivte Bind (1879), published posthumously
- H.C. Andersen. Samlede Skrifter. Anden Udgave (1880), published posthumously

Religion

- Psalmer ved første Gudstjeneste i Holmens Kirke (1836)

Satire and humor

- Et kjøbenhavnsk Eventyr Nytaarsnat (1829)
- Tanker over et Nul (1829)
- Tanker over nogle gamle forslidte Skoe (1830)
- Aphorismer efter Lichtenberg, Jean Paul og L. Börne (1830)
- En Samling Digterblomster og Aforismer af forskellige Forfattere (1830)
- En geographisk Beskrivelse af det menneskelige Hoved (1832)
- Akrostichon-Gaade. To danske Digteres Navne (1875)

Travelogues

- Fragment af en Reise fra Roeskilde til Helsingør (1826)
- Brudstykke af en Udflugt i Sommeren 1829. Odense og dens Omegn (1829)
- A journey on foot from Holmens Canal to the east point of Amager in the years 1828 and 1829 (Fodreise fra Holmens Canal til Østpynten af Amager i Aarene 1828 og 1829) (1829)
- Rambles in the Romantic Regions of the Hartz Mountains, Saxon Switzerland, &c. (Skyggebilleder af en Reise til Harzen, det sachsiske Schweiz etc. etc., i Sommeren 1831) (1831), C.A. Reitzel Publishers
- Raphaels Begravelse (1835)
- Blade af min Dagbog (1835)
- Thorvaldsen (1835)
- En Spadseretour gjennem Posilip-Grotten ved Neapel (1835)
- Italiensk Musik, Sang og Theatervæsen (1835)
- Den fattige Dreng paa Frankerigs Throne (1836)
- 'Mohammeds Fødselsdag' og 'Jernbanen' (1841)
- Tre romerske Drenge (1842)
- A Poet's Bazaar (En Digters Bazar) (1842), C.A. Reitzel Publishers
- I Sverrig (1851), C.A. Reitzel Publishers
- Silkeborg (1853)
- Ragaz (Bad-Pfäffers) (1858)
- Skagen (1859)
- Et Besøg hos Charles Dickens i Sommeren 1857 (1860)
- Liden Kirstens Grav (1860)
- Passionskuespillet i Oberammergau i 1860 (1860)
- Brudstykke af en Reise i Schweitz (Meddeelt til Billedet: Løven ved Luzern) (1861)
- In Spain (I Spanien) (1863), C.A. Reitzel Publishers
- A Visit to Portugal (Et Besøg i Portugal 1866) (1868), C.A. Reitzel Publishers
- I Jurabjergene (1869)
- Nürnberg. En Reise-Erindring fra Foraaret 1872 (1872)
- Et Blad, skrevet i Norge (1949), published posthumously
- Et Kapitel af en paatænkt historisk Sverigesroman (1964), published posthumously

Writing

- Den skjønne Grammatica, eller Badens latinske Grammatik (1831)

== Works by year ==
=== 1820s ===
- "The Tallow Candle", or "The Candlestick" ("Tællelyset") (1820s), this is Andersen's first fairy tale, written while he was still in school and dedicated to "Mme. Bunkeflod, one of his early benefactors."
- First attempts (Ungdoms-Forsøg) (1822), as Villiam Christian Walter, collection of 1 play and 1 short story, published at the author's expense:
  "Gjenfærdet ved Palnatokes Grav", "Alfsol" (play)
- Røverne i Vissenbjerg i Fyen (1822), play
- Fragment af en Reise fra Roeskilde til Helsingør (1826), travelogue
- Skjærmbræts-Billeder (1829), collection of 5 poems
- Love in Nicolai Tower or What says the pit (Kjærlighed paa Nicolai Taarn eller Hvad siger Parterret) (1829), C.A. Reitzel Publishers, Copenhagen, heroic vaudeville in one act
- "Til Kjøbenhavns-Postens Læsere, i Anledning af Herr XXX's Critik over: 'Kjærlighed paa Nicolai Taa'" (1829), article
- "Et Stykke Kage til den lille XXX, for hans Ricochets mod Hr. Andersen af 'En Beundrer af XXX'" (1829), article
- "Subscriptionsplan. Digte (1830)" (1829), article
- Et kjøbenhavnsk Eventyr Nytaarsnat (1829), satire and humor
- Tanker over et Nul (1829), satire and humor
- Brudstykke af en Udflugt i Sommeren 1829. Odense og dens Omegn (1829), travelogue
- A journey on foot from Holmens Canal to the east point of Amager in the years 1828 and 1829 (Fodreise fra Holmens Canal til Østpynten af Amager i Aarene 1828 og 1829) (1829), travelogue, published at the author's expense

=== 1830s ===
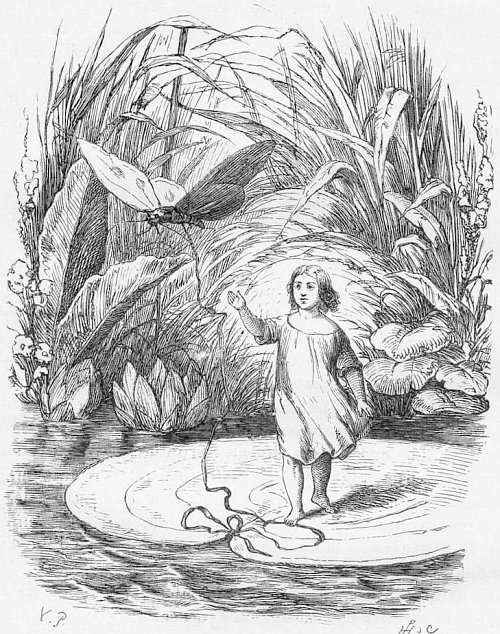
"Thumbelina" illustration by Vilhelm Pedersen. The illustrations were originally made for an edition from Carl B. Lorck's publishing house in Leipzig: Gesammelte Märchen. Mit 112 Illustrationen nach Originalzeichnungen von V. Pedersen. Im Holz geschnitten von Ed. Kretzschmar (1848).

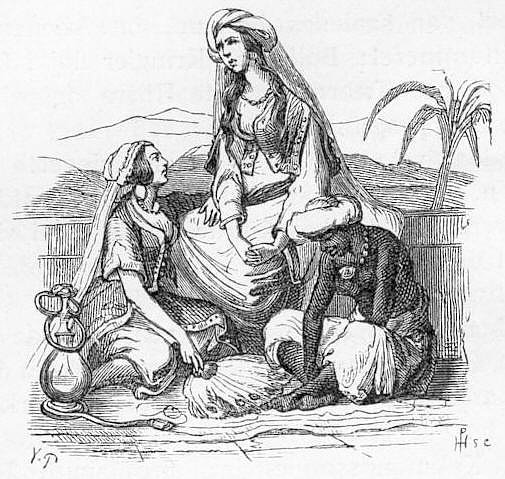
"The Flying Trunk" illustration by Vilhelm Pedersen.

- Poems (Digte) (1830), published at the author's expense, collection of 47 poems
- Prøve af 'Phantasier og Skizzer' (1830), collection of 3 poems
- Tre Smaae-Digte (1830), collection of 3 poems
- Tvende Smaadigte (1830), collection of 2 poems
- "Subskriptionsplan til 'Phantasier og Skizzer'" (1830), article
- Tanker over nogle gamle forslidte Skoe (1830), satire and humor
- Aphorismer efter Lichtenberg, Jean Paul og L. Börne (1830), satire and humor
- En Samling Digterblomster og Aforismer af forskellige Forfattere (1830), satire and humor
- Deviser med Presenterne paa et Juletræe (1831), collection of 7 poems
- Phantasies and sketches (Phantasier og Skizzer) (1831), published at the author's expense, collection of 50 poems
- Poetiske Penneprøver (1831), collection of 6 poems
- Vignettes for Danish poets (Vignetter til danske Digtere) (1831), C.A. Reitzel Publishers, collection of 67 poems
- Fornuftgiftermaalet Nr. 2. En Dramatisk Drøm paa Skagens Rev (1831), play
- The ship (Skibet) (1831), C.A. Reitzel Publishers, a vaudeville in one act, based on Scribe's and Mazere's "La Quarantaine"
- Rambles in the Romantic Regions of the Hartz Mountains, Saxon Switzerland, &c. (Skyggebilleder af en Reise til Harzen, det sachsiske Schweiz etc. etc., i Sommeren 1831) (1831), C.A. Reitzel Publishers, travelogue
- Den skjønne Grammatica, eller Badens latinske Grammatik (1831), writing
- The bride of Lammermoor (Bruden fra Lammermoor) (1832), F. Prinzlau Publishers, Copenhagen, original romantic ballad opera in four acts
- The raven or the fraternal test (Ravnen eller Broderprøven) (1832), Schubothske Boghandel, Copenhagen, magic opera in three acts, based on Gozzi's tragicomic fairy tale
- Poetiske Bagateller (1832), collection of 6 poems
- The twelve months of the year drawn in ink (Aarets tolv Maaneder, Tegnede med Blæk og Pen) (1832), C.A. Reitzel Publishers, collection of 12 poems
- En geographisk Beskrivelse af det menneskelige Hoved (1832), satire and humor
- Agnete and the Merman (Agnete og Havmanden) (1833), published at the author's expense, dramatic poem
- The queen of 16 (Dronningen paa 16 Aar) (1833), drama in two acts, a free translation of Bayard's "La reine de seize ans", Schubothske Boghandel, appeared as no. 47 of Det Kongelige Theaters Repertoire (The Royal Theatre repertoire), 2nd part
- Collected poems (Samlede Digte) (1833), C.A. Reitzel Publishers, collection of 68 poems
- Smaae-Digte (1833), collection of 7 poems
- "Uddrag af et Privatbrev fra Paris, dateret 11te Juni 1833" (1833), article
- "Fortale til Agnete og Havmanden" (1833), article
- Digte af H. C. Andersen I (1834), collection of 3 poems
- "Fortale til Subskriptionsindbydelse paa 'Improvisatoren'" (1834), article
- The Improvisatore (Improvisatoren) (1835), C.A. Reitzel Publishers, novel
- Fairy Tales Told for Children. First Collection. First Booklet (Eventyr, fortalte for Børn. Første Samling. Første Hefte) (1835), C.A. Reitzel Publishers, collection of 4 short stories:
  "Fyrtøiet", "Lille Claus og store Claus", "Prinsessen paa Ærten", "Den lille Idas blomster"
- Fairy Tales Told for Children. First Collection. Second Booklet (Eventyr, fortalte for Børn. Første Samling. Andet Hefte) (1835), C.A. Reitzel Publishers, collection of 3 short stories:
  "Tommelise", "Den uartige Dreng", "Reisekammeraten"
- Digte af H. C. Andersen II (1835), collection of 5 poems
- Smaa-Digte af H. C. Andersen (1835), collection of 2 poems
- Raphaels Begravelse (1835), travelogue
- Blade af min Dagbog (1835), travelogue
- Thorvaldsen (1835), travelogue
- En Spadseretour gjennem Posilip-Grotten ved Neapel (1835), travelogue
- Italiensk Musik, Sang og Theatervæsen (1835), travelogue
- O. T. (1836), C.A. Reitzel Publishers, original novel in two parts
- Smaahistorier (1836), collection of 3 short stories:
  "Den gamle Gud lever endnu", "Talismanen", "Det er Dig, Fabelen sigter til!"
- Digte af H. C. Andersen III (1836), collection of 2 poems
- Songs from the party at Kenilworth (Sangene i Festen paa Kenilworth) (1836), C.A. Reitzel Publishers, a romantic opera in three acts
- Parting and meeting. Original drama in two parts. First part: The Spaniards in Odense. Vaudeville in one act. Second part: Twenty-five years later. Vaudeville in one act (Skilles og mødes. Original dramatisk Digtning i to Afdelinger. Første Afdeling: Spanierne i Odense. Vaudeville i een Act. Anden Afdeling: Fem og tyve Aar derefter. Vaudeville i een Act) (1836), Schubothe Publishers, appeared as no. 76 of Det Kongelige Theaters Repertoire, 4th part
- "Erklæring i Anledning af Kritik i A. P. Berggreens i 'Musikalsk Tidende', Nr. 7 af 'Poetisk Jydepotte' fremsagt ved Hr. Sahlertz" (1836), article
- Psalmer ved første Gudstjeneste i Holmens Kirke (1836), religion
- Den fattige Dreng paa Frankerigs Throne (1836), travelogue
- Only a Fiddler (Kun en Spillemand) (1837), C.A. Reitzel Publishers, novel in three volumes
- Fairy Tales Told for Children. First Collection. Third Booklet (Eventyr, fortalte for Børn. Første Samling. Tredie Hefte) (1837), C.A. Reitzel Publishers, collection of 2 short stories:
  "Den lille havfrue", "Kejserens nye klæder"
- Fairy Tales Told for Children. New Collection. First Booklet (Eventyr, fortalte for Børn. Ny Samling. Første Hefte) (1838), C.A. Reitzel Publisher, collection of 3 short stories:
  "Gaaseurten", "Den standhaftige tinsoldat", "De vilde svaner"
- Three poetical works (Tre Digtninger) (1838), C.A. Reitzel Publishers, collection of 1 short story, 1 poem and 1 play:
  "Lykkens Kalosker", "En rigtig Soldat" (short one act verse play), "Det har Zombien gjort" (poem)
- Sange ved det Søsterlige Velgjørenheds Selskabs høitidelige Forsamling i Anledning af Hendes Majestæt Dronning Maria Sophia Frederikas høie Fødselsdag den 28de October 1838 (1838), collection of 2 songs
- Fairy Tales Told for Children. New Collection. Second Booklet (Eventyr, fortalte for Børn. Ny Samling. Andet Hefte) (1839), C.A. Reitzel Publisher, collection of 3 short stories:
  "Paradisets have", "Den flyvende Kuffert", "Storkene"
- A Picture Book without Pictures (Billedbog uden Billeder) (1839), C.A. Reitzel Publishers, collection of 20 short stories from A Picture Book without Pictures series:
  "Første Aften" (#1), "Anden Aften" (#2), "Tredie Aften" (#3), "Fjerde Aften" (#4), "Femte Aften" (#5), "Sjette Aften" (#6), "Syvende Aften" (#7), "Ottende Aften" (#8), "Niende Aften" (#9), "Tiende Aften" (#10), "Ellevte Aften" (#11), "Tolvte Aften" (#12), "Trettende Aften" (#13), "Fjortende Aften" (#14), "Femtende Aften" (#15), "Sextende Aften" (#16), "Syttende Aften" (#17), "Attende Aften" (#18), "Nittende Aften" (#19), "Tyvende Aften" (#20)
- The invisible person on Sprogø (Den Usynlige paa Sprogø) (1839), Schubothes Boghandling, dramatic joke in one act, with choruses and songs, appeared as no. 113 of Det Kongelige Theaters Repertoire, 5th part
- "Anmeldelse af H. C. Ørsteds Foredrag" (1839), article
- En Episode af Ole Bulls Liv (1839), biography

=== 1840s ===
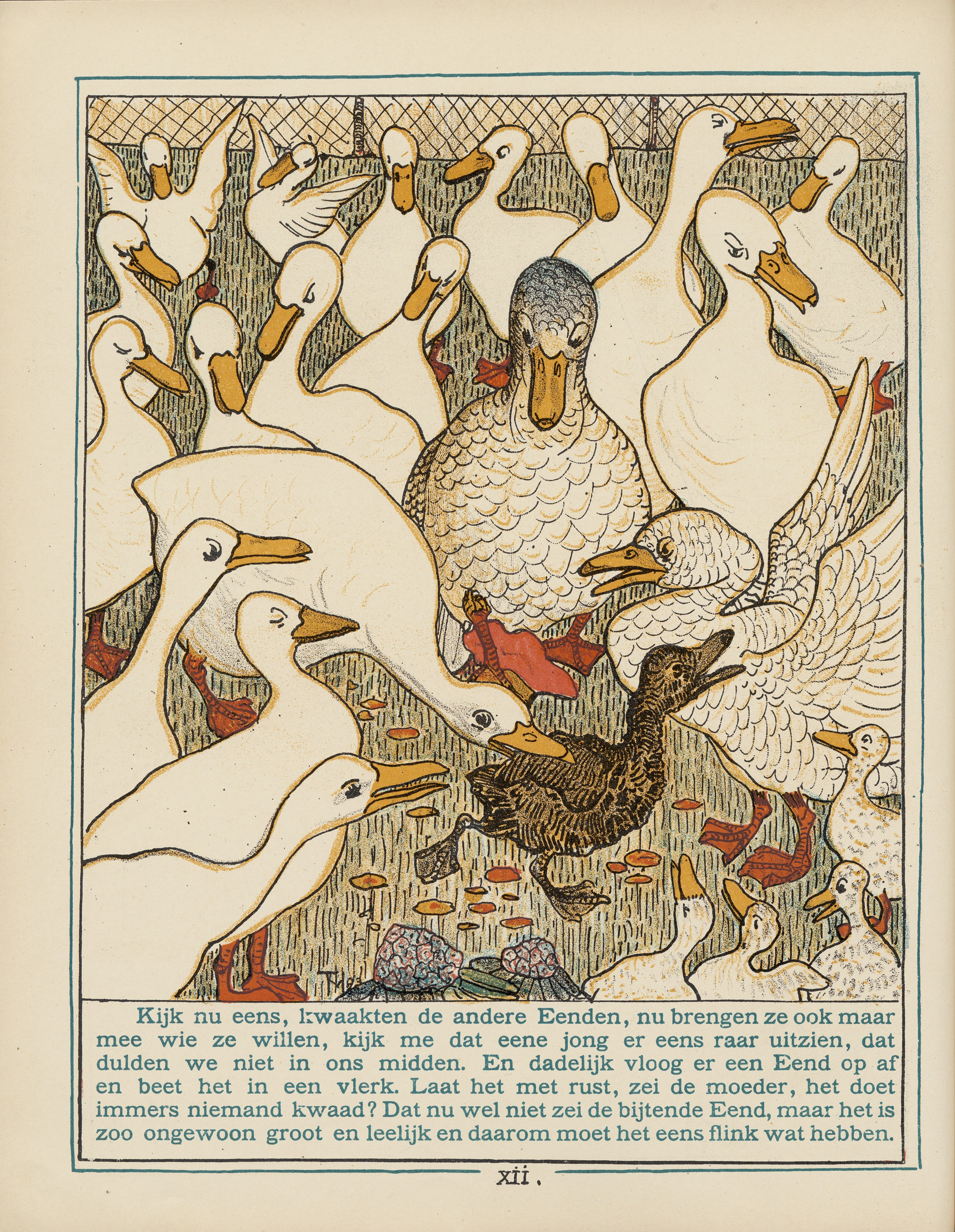
"The Ugly Duckling" illustration by Theo van Hoytema.

- A Picture Book without Pictures. New Collection (Billedbog uden Billeder. Ny Samling) (1840), collection of 6 short stories from A Picture Book without Pictures series:
  "En og tyvende Aften" (#21), "Tre og tyvende Aften" (#23), "Sex og tyvende Aften" (#26), "Otte og tyvende Aften" (#28), "Ni og tyvende Aften" (#29), "Tredivte Aften" (#30)
- Den onde Fyrste (The Wicked Prince, 1840), fairy tale
- Tre nye Billeder af H.C. Andersen (1840), collection of 3 short stories from A Picture Book without Pictures series:
  "To og tyvende Aften" (#22), "Fem og tyvende Aften" (#25), "Syv og tyvende Aften" (#27)
- An open-air comedy; vaudeville in one act based on the old ballad opera: "Actor against his Will" (En Comedie i det Grønne, Vaudeville i een Akt efter det gamle Lystspil: "Skuespilleren imod sin Villie") (1840), appeared as no. 124 of Det Kongelige Theaters Repertoire, 6th part
- The Moorish Girl (Maurerpigen) (1840), original tragedy in five acts, published at the author's expense
- Mikkels Kjærligheds Historier i Paris (1840), play
- The Mulatto (Mulatten) (1840), original romantic drama, published at the author's expense (2nd imprint one month later, also 1840, C.A. Reitzel Publishers)
- Smaavers af H. C. Andersen I (1840), collection of 3 poems
- Fairy Tales Told for Children. New Collection. Third Booklet (Eventyr, fortalte for Børn. Ny Samling. Tredie Hefte) (1841), C.A. Reitzel Publisher, collection of 4 short stories:
  "Ole Lukøje", "Rosen-Alfen", "Svinedrengen", "Boghveden"
- Vandring gjennem Opera-Galleriet (1841), opera
- "Fortale af H. C. Andersen, til 'Konstnerfamilien'" (1841), article
- 'Mohammeds Fødselsdag' og 'Jernbanen' (1841), travelogue
- Tre romerske Drenge (1842), travelogue
- A Poet's Bazaar (En Digters Bazar) (1842), C.A. Reitzel Publishers, travelogue
- New Fairy Tales. First Volume. First Collection (Nye Eventyr. Første Bind. Første Samling) (1843), C.A. Reitzel Publishers, collection of 4 short stories:
  "Engelen", "Nattergalen", "Kjærestefolkene [Toppen og bolden]", "Den grimme ælling"
- Picture Book without Pictures. Second Enhanced Edition (Billedbog uden Billeder. Anden forøgede Udgave) (1844), collection of 26 short stories from A Picture Book without Pictures series:
  "Første Aften" (#1), "Anden Aften" (#2), "Tredie Aften" (#3), "Fjerde Aften" (#4), "Femte Aften" (#5), "Sjette Aften" (#6), "Syvende Aften" (#7), "Ottende Aften" (#8), "Niende Aften" (#9), "Tiende Aften" (#10), "Ellevte Aften" (#11), "Tolvte Aften" (#12), "Trettende Aften" (#13), "Fjortende Aften" (#14), "Femtende Aften" (#15), "Sextende Aften" (#16), "Syttende Aften" (#17), "Attende Aften" (#18), "Nittende Aften" (#19), "Tyvende Aften" (#20), "En og tyvende Aften" (#21), "To og tyvende Aften" (#22), "Fire og tyvende Aften" (#24), "Fem og tyvende Aften" (#25), "Syv og tyvende Aften" (#27), "Een og tredivte Aften" (#31)
- New Fairy Tales. First Volume. Second Collection (Nye Eventyr. Første Bind. Anden Samling) (1844), C.A. Reitzel Publishers, collection of 2 short stories:
  "Grantræet", "Snedronningen"
- The king dreams (Kongen drømmer) (1844), play
- Digte af H. C. Andersen IV (1844), collection of 5 poems
- Digte af H. C. Andersen V (1844), collection of 4 poems
- Smaavers af H. C. Andersen II (1844), collection of 5 poems
- Sange af Vaudevillen: 'Fuglen i Pæretræet' (1844), collection of 6 poems
- Bertel Thorvaldsen. En biographisk Skizze (1844), biography
- New Fairy Tales. First Volume. Third Collection (Nye Eventyr. Første Bind. Tredie Samling) (1845), C.A. Reitzel Publishers, collection of 5 short stories:
  "Elverhøi", "De røde Skoe", "Springfyrene", "Hyrdinden og Skorstensfejeren", "Holger Danske"
- The flower of happiness (Lykkens Blomst) (1845), C.A. Reitzel Publishers, magic comedy in two act
- Henriette Hanck (1845), biography
- To Billeder fra Kjøbenhavn (1846), collection of 2 short stories:
  "Fra et Vindue i Vartou", "Et Billede fra Castelsvolden"
- Little Kirsten (Liden Kirsten) (1846), original romantic ballad opera in one act, published at the author's expense
- Poems old and new (Digte, gamle og nye) (1846), C.A. Reitzel Publishers, collection of 92 poems
- Picture Book without Pictures. Full Version (Billedbog uden Billeder. Komplet udgave) (1847), collection of 33 short stories from A Picture Book without Pictures series:
  "Første Aften" (#1), "Anden Aften" (#2), "Tredie Aften" (#3), "Fjerde Aften" (#4), "Femte Aften" (#5), "Sjette Aften" (#6), "Syvende Aften" (#7), "Ottende Aften" (#8), "Niende Aften" (#9), "Tiende Aften" (#10), "Ellevte Aften" (#11), "Tolvte Aften" (#12), "Trettende Aften" (#13), "Fjortende Aften" (#14), "Femtende Aften" (#15), "Sextende Aften" (#16), "Syttende Aften" (#17), "Attende Aften" (#18), "Nittende Aften" (#19), "Tyvende Aften" (#20), "En og tyvende Aften" (#21), "To og tyvende Aften" (#22), "Tre og tyvende Aften" (#23), "Fire og tyvende Aften" (#24), "Fem og tyvende Aften" (#25), "Sex og tyvende Aften" (#26), "Syv og tyvende Aften" (#27), "Otte og tyvende Aften" (#28), "Ni og tyvende Aften" (#29), "Tredivte Aften" (#30), "Een og tredivte Aften" (#31), "To og tredivte Aften" (#32), "Tre og tredivte Aften" (#33)
- Fortællinger og Digte af H. C. Andersen (1847), collection of 2 short stories and 2 poems:
  "To og tredivte Aften" (A Picture Book without Pictures series #32), "Pigen fra Albano (Madonna! jeg næppe af glæde kan tale,)" (poem), "Tre og tredivte Aften" (A Picture Book without Pictures series #33), "Romance (Langt, langt fra hjemmets kyst)" (poem)
- Ahasverus (1847), C.A. Reitzel Publishers, philosophical-historical work in the form of a lyrical dialogue
- The Fairy Tale of My Life (Mit eget Eventyr uden Digtning) (1847), autobiography, printed as vols. I and II of Andersen's Gesammelte Werke – according to the contract planned to comprise 30 volumes, but with later supplements the work grew to a total of 50 volumes – which began to appear in 1847; Carl B. Lorck Publishers, Leipzig. The Danish original manuscript was first published by Helge Topsøe-Jensen: Mit eget Eventyr uden Digtning), Nyt Nordisk Forlag/Arnold Busck Publishers, Copenhagen, 1942.
- New Fairy Tales. Second Volume. First Collection (Nye Eventyr. Andet Bind. Første Samling) (1847), C.A. Reitzel Publishers, collection of 5 short stories:
  "Den gamle Gadeløgte", "Nabofamilierne", "Stoppenaalen", "Lille Tuk", "Skyggen"
- The Two Baronesses (De to Baronesser) (1848), C.A. Reitzel Publishers, novel in three parts (first published in England, translated by Charles Beckwith Lohmeyer. Richard Bentley, London)
- New Fairy Tales. Second Volume. Second Collection (Nye Eventyr. Andet Bind. Anden Samling) (1848), C.A. Reitzel Publishers, collection of 6 short stories:
  "Det gamle Huus", "Vanddraaben", "Den lille Pige med Svovlstikkerne", "Den lykkelige Familie", "Historien om en moder", "Flipperne"
- The Dannevirke of art (Kunstens Dannevirke) (1848), C.A. Reitzel Publishers, play, prelude at the centenary celebrations of the Royal Danish Theatre in 1848 [NB! Dannevirke: historical fortifications south of Denmark]
- "De Svenske i Fyen i Sommeren 1848" (1848), article
- Fairy-tales (Eventyr) (1849), C.A. Reitzel Publishers (with 125 illustrations based on the original drawings by Vilhelm Pedersen, woodcuts by Ed. Kretzschmar [in Leipzig], 1850; appeared in five booklets from August to December 1849), first illustrated book edition in Denmark, collection of 43 short stories:
  "Lille Tuk", "Grantræet", "Svinedrengen", "Kjærestefolkene [Toppen og bolden]", "Hyldemoer", "Elverhøi", "Snedronningen", "Holger Danske", "Ole Lukøje", "Tommelise", "Lille Claus og store Claus", "Den standhaftige tinsoldat", "Boghveden", "Den lille havfrue", "Den uartige Dreng", "Paradisets have", "Gaaseurten", "Den grimme ælling", "Storkene", "Engelen", "Hyrdinden og Skorstensfejeren", "Prinsessen paa Ærten", "Fyrtøiet", "De røde Skoe", "Reisekammeraten", "Springfyrene", "Nattergalen", "Rosen-Alfen", "Den flyvende Kuffert", "Den gamle Gadeløgte", "Den lille Pige med Svovlstikkerne", "De vilde svaner", "Den lille Idas blomster", "Nabofamilierne", "Klokken", "Stoppenaalen", "Skyggen", "Det gamle Huus", "Hørren", "Vanddraaben", "Den lykkelige Familie", "Historien om en moder", "Flipperne"
- 6 character studies composed for pianoforte (6 Characteerstykker componerede som Studier for Pianoforte) (1849), C.C. Lose & Delbanco, Copenhagen, by J.P.E. Hartmann, booklets 1–2, opus 50 (with introductory verses by Hans Christian Andersen for each piano composition)
- 6 indledende Smaavers (1849), collection of 6 poems
- The wedding at Lake Como (Brylluppet ved Como-Søen) (1849), C.A. Reitzel Publishers, opera in three acts, this material is taken from some chapters in Manzoni's novel I promessi sposi
- More than pearls and gold (Meer end Perler og Guld) (1849), C.A. Reitzel Publishers, a fairy-tale comedy in four acts. A free adaptation from F. Raimund and the "Arabian Nights"
- "'Midsommar-Resan'. En Vall-Fart af Förf. til Teckningar ur hvardagslifvet" (1849), article

=== 1850s ===
- 6 indledende Smaavers II (1850), collection of 6 poems
- A Christmas greeting for adults and children from Danish composers (Julehilsen til Store og Smaae fra danske Componister) (1850), C.C. Lose & Delbanco, Copenhagen, contains 6 little verses by Hans Christian Andersen as introductions to each of the 6 piano compositions (by the composers Niels W. Gade, J.P.E. Hartmann, Eduard Helsted, Emil Hornemann the Elder, H.S. Paulli and Anton Rée), book of 6 sheet music with poems
- Den nye Barselstue (1850), C.A. Reitzel Publishers, literally the new lying-in room, original comedy in one act [NB. This defies translation. The title alludes to a comedy by Holberg ridiculing the Danish practice of paying visits to a new mother shortly after the birth of her child]
- A night in Roskilde (En Nat i Roeskilde) (1850), C.A. Reitzel Publishers, a vaudeville in one act, based on Warin Charles Varin and Lefèvre's "Une chambre à deux lits"
- Ole Lukoie (Ole Lukøje) (1850), C.A. Reitzel Publishers, fairy tale comedy in three acts
- Patriotic verses and songs from the War (Fædrelandske Vers og Sange under Krigen) (1851), published together at the author's expense for the benefit of the wounded and bereaved, the Three Years' War 1848–50 over the duchies of Schleswig and Holstein, collection of 14 poems
- The Elder Tree Mother (Hyldemoer) (1851), C.A. Reitzel Publishers, fantasy in one act
- "Et Par Ord om 'Hyldemoer'" (1851), article
- I Sverrig (1851), C.A. Reitzel Publishers, travelogue, pictures of Sweden [travel book], translated by Charles Beckwith Lohmeyer. Richard Bentley, London
- Stories. First Collection (Historier. Første Samling) (1852), C.A. Reitzel Publishers, collection of 7 short stories:
  "Aarets Historie", "Verdens deiligste Rose", "Et Billede fra Castelsvolden", "Paa den yderste Dag", "Det er ganske vist!", "Svanereden", "Et godt Humeur"
- Stories. Second Collection (Historier. Anden Samling) (1852), C.A. Reitzel Publishers, collection of 5 short stories:
  "Hjertesorg", "'Alt paa sin rette Plads!'", "Nissen hos Spekhøkeren", "Om Aartusinder", "Under Piletræet"
- "The Last Pearl" ("Den sidste Perle") (1853), uncollected fairy tale
- "A Leaf from Heaven" ("Et Blad fra Himlen") (1853), uncollected fairy tale
- The Nix (Nøkken) (1853), C.A. Reitzel Publishers, opera in one act
- Jens Adolph Jerichau og Elisabeth Jerichau, født Baumann (1853), biography
- Samlede Skrifter af H. C. Andersen. Første Bind (1853), essays
- Samlede Skrifter af H. C. Andersen. Andet Bind (1853), essays
- Samlede Skrifter af H. C. Andersen. Tredie Bind (1853), essays
- Samlede Skrifter af H. C. Andersen. Fjerde Bind (1853), essays
- Silkeborg (1853), travelogue
- Fuglen i Pæretræet (1854), play
- Indledning til Carnevalet (1854), play
- Samlede Skrifter af H. C. Andersen. Femte Bind (1854), essays
- Samlede Skrifter af H. C. Andersen. Sjette Bind (1854), essays
- Samlede Skrifter af H. C. Andersen. Syvende Bind (1854), essays
- Samlede Skrifter af H. C. Andersen. Ottende Bind (1854), essays
- Samlede Skrifter af H. C. Andersen. Niende Bind (1854), essays
- Samlede Skrifter af H. C. Andersen. Tiende Bind (1854), essays
- Samlede Skrifter af H. C. Andersen. Ellevte Bind (1854), essays
- Samlede Skrifter af H. C. Andersen. Tolvte Bind (1854), essays
- Samlede Skrifter af H. C. Andersen. Trettende Bind (1854), essays
- Samlede Skrifter af H. C. Andersen. Fjortende Bind (1854), essays
- Samlede Skrifter af H. C. Andersen. Femtende Bind (1854), essays
- Samlede Skrifter af H. C. Andersen. Sextende Bind (1854), essays
- Stories (Historier) (1855), with 55 illustrations based on the original drawings by V. Pedersen, woodcuts by Ed. Kretzschmar [a reprint of the stories printed previously, but the first edition of the stories with V.P.'s illustrations], the estate and heirs of C.A. Reitzel, collection of 22 short stories:
  "Ib og lille Christine", "Klods-Hans", "Fra et Vindue i Vartou", "Den gamle Gravsteen", "Fem fra en Ærtebælg", "'Hun duede ikke'", "Pengegrisen", "Ved det yderste Hav", "To Jomfruer", "'Der er Forskjel'", "Aarets Historie", "Verdens deiligste Rose", "Et Billede fra Castelsvolden", "Paa den yderste Dag", "Det er ganske vist!", "Svanereden", "Et godt Humeur", "Hjertesorg", "'Alt paa sin rette Plads!'", "Nissen hos Spekhøkeren", "Om Aartusinder", "Under Piletræet"
- Indledende Smaavers (1855), collection of 6 poems
- Six short pieces for pianoforte (Novellette i sex Smaastykker for Pianoforte) (1855), C.C. Lose & Delbanco, by J.P.E. Hartmann with introductory verses by Hans Christian Andersen for each of the 6 piano compositions
- A village story (En Landsbyhistorie) (1855), the estate and heirs of C.A. Reitzel, popular play in five acts based on S.H. Mosenthal's "Der Sonnenwendhof" with additional choruses and songs
- The Fairy Tale of My Life (Mit Livs Eventyr) (1855), autobiography, published as vols. 21 and 22 in the Danish edition of Andersen's Samlede Skrifter (Collected writings); also published as a separate book edition. The estate and heirs of C.A. Reitzel, 1855. Translated by R.P. Keigwin. With Illustrations in Colour by Niels Larsen Stevns. British Book Centre, New York/ Maxsons & Co., London/ Nyt Nordisk Forlag. Arnold Busck Publishers, Copenhagen, 1954.
- Samlede Skrifter af H. C. Andersen. Syttende Bind (1855), essays
- Samlede Skrifter af H. C. Andersen. Attende Bind (1855), essays
- Samlede Skrifter af H. C. Andersen. Nittende Bind (1855), essays
- Samlede Skrifter af H. C. Andersen. Tyvende Bind (1855), essays
- Samlede Skrifter af H. C. Andersen. Eet og Tyvende og To og Tyvende Bind (1855), essays
- "Berigtigelse af en Fejl i 'Mit Livs Eventyr'" (1856), article
- To be or not to be? (At være eller ikke være) (1857), novel in three parts, issued as vol. 23 of Samlede Skrifter (Collected works), the estate and heirs of C.A. Reitzel, 1857. Translated by Anne Bushby. Richard Bentley, London, 1857.
- "Af et Brev fra London. (Juli 1857)" (1857), article
- Samlede Skrifter af H. C. Andersen. Tre og Tyvende Bind (1857), essays
- New Fairy Tales and Stories. First Series. First Collection (Nye Eventyr og Historier. Første Række. Første Samling) (1858), the estate and heirs of C.A. Reitzel, collection of 6 short stories:
  "Suppe paa en Pølsepind", "Flaskehalsen", "Pebersvendens Nathue", "'Noget'", "Det gamle Egetræes sidste Drøm", "ABC-Bogen"
- New Fairy Tales and Stories. First Series. Second Collection (Nye Eventyr og Historier. Første Række. Anden Samling) (1858), the estate and heirs of C.A. Reitzel, collection of 3 short stories:
  "Dynd-Kongens Datter", "Hurtigløberne", "Klokkedybet"
- Ragaz (Bad-Pfäffers) (1858), travelogue
- New Fairy Tales and Stories. First Series. Third Collection (Nye Eventyr og Historier. Første Række. Tredie Samling) (1859), C.A. Reitzel Publishers, collection of 6 short stories:
  "Vinden fortæller om Valdemar Daae og hans Døttre", "Pigen, som traadte paa Brødet", "Taarnvægteren Ole", "Anne Lisbeth", "Børnesnak", "Et stykke Perlesnor"
- New Fairy Tales and Stories. First Series. Fourth Collection (Nye Eventyr og Historier. Første Række. Fjerde Samling) (1859), C.A. Reitzel Publishers, collection of 5 short stories:
  "Pen og Blækhuus", "Barnet i Graven", "Gaardhanen og Veirhanen", "'Deilig!'", "En Historie fra Klitterne"
- Skagen (1859), travelogue

=== 1860s ===
- Johan Peter Emilius Hartmann (1860), biography
- Et Besøg hos Charles Dickens i Sommeren 1857 (1860), travelogue
- Liden Kirstens Grav (1860), travelogue
- Passionskuespillet i Oberammergau i 1860 (1860), travelogue
- New Fairy Tales and Stories. Second Series. First Collection (Nye Eventyr og Historier. Anden Række. Første Samling) (1861), C.A. Reitzel Publishers, collection of 7 short stories:
  "Tolv med Posten", "Skarnbassen", "Hvad Fatter gjør, det er altid det Rigtige", "De Vises Steen", "Sneemanden", "I Andegaarden", "Det nye Aarhundredes Musa"
- New Fairy Tales and Stories. Second Series. Second Collection (Nye Eventyr og Historier. Anden Række. Anden Samling) (1861), C.A. Reitzel Publishers, collection of 4 short stories:
  "Iisjomfruen", "Sommerfuglen", "Psychen", "Sneglen og Rosenhækken"
- "Protest til Redacteur Ploug mod Clemens Petersens Anmeldelse i 'Fædrelandet' af af Carit Etlars Folkekomedie 'Hr. Lauge med den" (1861), article
- "Brev fra Prof. H. C. Andersen, dateret Florents den 3 juni" (1861), article
- Brudstykke af en Reise i Schweitz (Meddeelt til Billedet: Løven ved Luzern) (1861), travelogue
- Fairy Tales and Stories. First Volume (Eventyr og Historier. Første Bind) (1862), collection of 27 short stories:
  "Grantræet", "Fyrtøiet", "Lille Claus og store Claus", "Prinsessen paa Ærten", "Den lille Idas blomster", "Tommelise", "Den uartige Dreng", "Reisekammeraten", "Den lille havfrue", "Gaaseurten", "Den standhaftige tinsoldat", "De vilde svaner", "Paradisets have", "Den flyvende Kuffert", "Storkene", "Metalsvinet", "Venskabs-Pagten", "En Rose fra Homers Grav", "Ole Lukøje", "Rosen-Alfen", "Svinedrengen", "Boghveden", "Engelen", "Nattergalen", "Kjærestefolkene [Toppen og bolden]", "Den grimme ælling", "Snedronningen"
- Digte af H. C. Andersen VI (1862), collection of 4 poems
- "Brudstykke af et Brev fra Spanien" (1862), article
- "Brudstykke af et Brev, dateret Valencia, den 18de September" (1862), article
- "Brudstykke af et Brev dateret Granada den 12. Oktober" (1862), article
- "Brudstykke af et Brev dateret Tanger den 3. November" (1862), article
- "Brudstykke af et Brev dateret Madrid den 18. December" (1862), article
- Digteren Bernhard Severin Ingemann (1862), biography
- Fairy Tales and Stories. Second Volume (Eventyr og Historier. Andet Bind) (1863), collection of 48 short stories and 1 article:
  "Bedstemoder", "Lille Tuk", "Fugl Phønix", "Hyldemoer", "Stoppenaalen", "Klokken", "Elverhøi", "De røde Skoe", "Springfyrene", "Hyrdinden og Skorstensfejeren", "Holger Danske", "Den lille Pige med Svovlstikkerne", "Et Billede fra Castelsvolden", "Den gamle Gadeløgte", "Nabofamilierne", "Skyggen", "Det gamle Huus", "Vanddraaben", "Den lykkelige Familie", "Historien om en moder", "Flipperne", "Hørren", "En Historie", "Den stumme Bog", "'Der er Forskjel'", "Den gamle Gravsteen", "Verdens deiligste Rose", "Aarets Historie", "Paa den yderste Dag", "Det er ganske vist!", "Svanereden", "Et godt Humeur", "Hjertesorg", "'Alt paa sin rette Plads!'", "Nissen hos Spekhøkeren", "Om Aartusinder", "Under Piletræet", "Fem fra en Ærtebælg", "Klods-Hans", "'Hun duede ikke'", "Ib og lille Christine", "To Jomfruer", "Ved det yderste Hav", "Pengegrisen", "'Ærens Tornevei'", "Jødepigen", "Flaskehalsen", "De Vises Steen", "Bemærkninger" (article)
- Digte fra Spanien (1863), collection of 6 poems
- "Bemærkninger" (1863), article
- Samlede Skrifter af H. C. Andersen. Fire og Tyvende Bind (1863), essays
- In Spain (I Spanien) (1863), C.A. Reitzel Publishers, published as vol. 24 af Samlede Skrifter(Collected works), travelogue
- He is not [nobly] born (Han er ikke født) (1864), C.A. Reitzel Publishers, original comedy in two acts
- On Langebro (Paa Langebro) (1864), C.A. Reitzel Publishers, popular comedy with choruses and songs in four acts [not identical with the students' farce Langebro, which Andersen wrote in 1837 for the Students' Association, but did not have printed], based on Musæus [Musäus] and Kotzebue (The fairy tale "Den stumme Kjærlighed" (Mute love))
- New Fairy Tales and Stories. Second Series. Third Collection (Nye Eventyr og Historier. Anden Række. Tredie Samling) (1865), C.A. Reitzel Publishers, collection of 7 short stories:
  "Lygtemændene ere i Byen, sagde Mosekonen", "Veirmøllen", "Sølvskillingen", "Bispen paa Børglum og hans Frænde", "I Børnestuen", "Guldskat", "Stormen flytter Skilt"
- When the Spaniards Were Here (Da Spanierne var her) (1865), C.A. Reitzel Publishers, original romantic comedy in three acts
- The Raven (Ravnen) (1865), C.A. Reitzel Publishers, fairy tale opera in four acts, new version of text and music from the eponymous ballad opera from 1832
- New Fairy Tales and Stories. Second Series. Fourth Collection (Nye Eventyr og Historier. Anden Række. Fjerde Samling) (1866), C.A. Reitzel Publishers, collection of 6 short stories:
  "Gjemt er ikke glemt", "Portnerens Søn", "Flyttedagen", "Sommergjækken", "Moster", "Skrubtudsen"
- 6 Smaarim (1866), collection of 6 poems
- Photographs of groups of children (Fotograferede Børnegrupper) (1866), 6 photos by Harald Paetz, with rhymes added by Professor Hans Christian Andersen (published by the photographer)
- "Uddrag af et Brev, dateret Leyden, den 17. Marts" (1866), article
- "Af et Brev fra H. C. Andersen, dateret Lissabon, den 16. Mai" (1866), article
- "Uddrag af et Brev, omhandlende Rejsen til Portugal" (1866), article
- "Fra H. C. Andersens Reise. Brev dateret Setubal den 19de Juni 1866" (1866), article
- "Brudstykke af et Brev dateret Cintra den 31. Juli" (1866), article
- Fifteen Fairy Tales and Stories (Femten Eventyr og Historier) (1867), C.A. Reitzel Publishers, with illustrations by Lorenz Frølich [first edition illustrated by Frølich, who took over from Vilhelm Pedersen], collection of 15 short stories:
  "Tolv med Posten", "Barnet i Graven", "Suppe paa en Pølsepind", "Anne Lisbeth", "'Noget'", "Hurtigløberne", "Pebersvendens Nathue", "ABC-Bogen", "Sneemanden", "Klokkedybet", "Skarnbassen", "Psychen", "Hvad Fatter gjør, det er altid det Rigtige", "Børnesnak", "Pen og Blækhuus"
- Smaavers af H. C. Andersen III (1867), collection of 4 poems
- Well-known and forgotten poems (Kjendte og glemte Digte) (1867), C.A. Reitzel Publishers, collection of 42 poems
- Kong Saul (1867), opera
- "Svarskrivelse til Odense Kommunalbestyrelse paa Indbydelsen til at komme til Odense den 6/12 for at modtage Diplomet som Æresbor" (1867), article
- "Takketale ved Overrækkelsen af Diplomet" (1867), article
- "Brev, dateret København d. 2den Januar 1867. (poetico for: 1868)" (1867), article
- "Takskrivelse til Studenterforeningen" (1867)
- I Vetturinens Vogn (1868), play
- "Bemærkninger" (1868), article
- Samlede Skrifter af H. C. Andersen. Fem og Tyvende Bind (1868), essays
- Samlede Skrifter af H. C. Andersen. Sex og Tyvende Bind (1868), essays
- Samlede Skrifter af H. C. Andersen. Syv og Tyvende Bind (1868), essays
- Samlede Skrifter af H. C. Andersen. Otte og Tyvende Bind (1868), essays
- A Visit to Portugal (Et Besøg i Portugal 1866) (1868), C.A. Reitzel Publishers, travelogue, printed with several minor travel sketches and two biographical essays (on B.S. Ingemann and J.P.E. Hartmann) in vol. 28 af Samlede Skrifter (Collected works) under the common title Reiseskizzer og Pennetegninger (Travel sketches and ink drawings)
- Three new Fairy Tales and Stories (Tre nye Eventyr og Historier) (1869), C.A. Reitzel Publishers, collection of 3 short stories:
  "Hønse-Grethes Familie", "Hvad Tidselen oplevede", "Hvad man kan hitte paa"
- "The Court Cards" ("Herrebladene") (1869), uncollected fairy tale
- "Et Brev fra Etatsraad H. C. Andersen til Udgiveren" (1869), article
- I Jurabjergene (1869), travelogue

=== 1870s ===
- Lucky Peer (Lykke-Peer) (1870), C.A. Reitzel Publishers, novel
- Fairy Tales and Stories. Third Volume (Eventyr og Historier. Tredie Bind) (1870), collection of 24 short stories:
  "Suppe paa en Pølsepind", "Pebersvendens Nathue", "'Noget'", "Det gamle Egetræes sidste Drøm", "ABC-Bogen", "Dynd-Kongens Datter", "Hurtigløberne", "Klokkedybet", "Den onde Fyrste", "Vinden fortæller om Valdemar Daae og hans Døttre", "Pigen, som traadte paa Brødet", "Taarnvægteren Ole", "Anne Lisbeth", "Børnesnak", "Et stykke Perlesnor", "Pen og Blækhuus", "Barnet i Graven", "Gaardhanen og Veirhanen", "'Deilig!'", "En Historie fra Klitterne", "Marionetspilleren", "To Brødre", "Den gamle Kirkeklokke", "Tolv med Posten"
- "Danish Popular Legends" ("Danske Folkesagn") (1870), uncollected fairy tale
- "Brev dateret Rom, den 5te December 1833" (1870), article
- "Brev dateret Kjøbenhavn, den 15de September 1836" (1870), article
- Fairy Tales and Stories. Fourth Volume (Eventyr og Historier. Fjerde Bind) (1871), collection of 27 short stories:
  "Skarnbassen", "Hvad Fatter gjør, det er altid det Rigtige", "Sneemanden", "I Andegaarden", "Det nye Aarhundredes Musa", "Iisjomfruen", "Sommerfuglen", "Psychen", "Sneglen og Rosenhækken", "Lygtemændene ere i Byen, sagde Mosekonen", "Veirmøllen", "Sølvskillingen", "Bispen paa Børglum og hans Frænde", "I Børnestuen", "Guldskat", "Stormen flytter Skilt", "Theepotten", "Folkesangens Fugl", "De smaa Grønne", "Nissen og Madamen", "Peiter, Peter og Peer", "Gjemt er ikke glemt", "Portnerens Søn", "Flyttedagen", "Sommergjækken", "Moster", "Skrubtudsen"
- The Story of My Life (1871), autobiography, printed as an appendix to Horace Scudder's new edition of Andersen's memoirs, published as part of this edition
- New Fairy Tales and Stories. Third Series. New [first] Collection (Nye Eventyr og Historier. Tredie Række. Ny [første] Samling) (1872), collection of 13 short stories:
  "Gartneren og Herskabet", "Den store Søslange", "'Spørg Amagermo'er!'", "'Dandse, dandse Dukke min!'", "Hvad hele Familien sagde", "Det Utroligste", "Lysene", "Hvem var den Lykkeligste?", "Oldefa'er", "Solskins-Historier", "Ugedagene", "Kometen", "Lykken kan ligge i en Pind"
- New Fairy Tales and Stories. Third Series. Second Collection (Nye Eventyr og Historier. Tredie Række. Anden Samling) (1872), C.A. Reitzel Publishers, collection of 4 short stories:
  "Tante Tandpine", "Krøblingen", "Portnøglen", "Hvad gamle Johanne fortalte" (the last story Andersen wrote)
- Fairy Tales and Stories. New Collection (Eventyr og Historier. Ny Samling) (1872), C.A. Reitzel Publishers, collection of 12 short stories:
  "Kometen", "Ugedagene", "Solskins-Historier", "Oldefa'er", "Hvem var den Lykkeligste?", "Lysene", "Det Utroligste", "Hvad hele Familien sagde", "'Dandse, dandse Dukke min!'", "'Spørg Amagermo'er!'", "Den store Søslange", "Gartneren og Herskabet"
- Smaavers af H. C. Andersen IV (1872), collection of 2 poems
- Nürnberg. En Reise-Erindring fra Foraaret 1872 (1872), travelogue
- Fairy Tales and Stories. Fifth Volume (Eventyr og Historier. Femte Bind) (1874), collection of 25 short stories and 1 article:
  "Bemærkninger til Eventyr og Historier" (article), "Gudfaders Billedbog", "Laserne", "Vænø og Glænø", "Hvem var den Lykkeligste?", "Dryaden", "Hønse-Grethes Familie", "Hvad Tidselen oplevede", "Hvad man kan hitte paa", "Lykken kan ligge i en Pind", "Kometen", "Ugedagene", "Solskins-Historier", "Oldefa'er", "Lysene", "Det Utroligste", "Hvad hele Familien sagde", "'Dandse, dandse Dukke min!'", "'Spørg Amagermo'er!'", "Den store Søslange", "Gartneren og Herskabet", "Loppen og Professoren", "Hvad gamle Johanne fortalte", "Portnøglen", "Krøblingen", "Tante Tandpine"
- "Uddrag af et Brev til Edmund W. Gosse" (1874), article
- "H. C. Andersen og de amerikanske Børn" (1874), article
- "Bemærkninger til Eventyr og Historier" (1874), article
- "Til mine Landsmænd" (1875), article
- "Brev, dateret: Kjøbenhavn, den 5te April 1875, til Redaktøren af 'Søndags-Posten'" (1875), article
- Akrostichon-Gaade. To danske Digteres Navne (1875), satire and humor

=== Published posthumously ===
1870s

- To Digte af H. C. Andersen (1875), collection of 2 poems
- "Et Curiosum fra 1822" (1875), article
- Festen paa Kenilworth (1876), play
- Samlede Skrifter af H. C. Andersen. Ni og Tyvende Bind (1876), essays
- Samlede Skrifter af H. C. Andersen. Tredivte Bind (1876), essays
- Samlede Skrifter af H. C. Andersen. En og Tredivte Bind (1876), essays
- Samlede Skrifter af H. C. Andersen. To og Tredivte Bind (1876), essays
- H.C. Andersens Samlede Skrifter. Supplement til 'Mit Livs Eventyr' (1877), autobiography
- Tre utrykte Digte af H. C. Andersen (1878), collection of 3 poems
- Samlede Skrifter af H. C. Andersen. Tre og Tredivte Bind (1879), essays

1880s

- H.C. Andersen. Samlede Skrifter. Anden Udgave (1880), essays
- Intermediet til Holbergs: Kilderejsen (1883), play

1910s

- Hr. Rasmussen (1913), play

1920s

- To ukendte Eventyr af H. C. Andersen (1926), collection of 2 short stories:
  "Qvæk", "Skriveren"

1930s

- Sorøe Gang (1935), unfinished novel
- Fragmenter af en ufuldført historisk Roman (1935), unfinished novel
- Christian den Andens Dverg (1935), unfinished novel
- Danmark (1937), play

1940s

- Truth (1940), play
- "Den første Aften" (1943), uncollected fairy tale, A Picture Book without Pictures series #34
- Et Blad, skrevet i Norge (1949), travelogue

1950s

- Tre ufuldførte historiske Digtninge (1955), collection of 3 poems

1960s

- Et Kapitel af en paatænkt historisk Sverigesroman (1964), travelogue

1980s

- Sangerinden (1987), play

2000s

- I Maaneskin (2001), play
- Langebro (2001), play
- Souffleurens Benefice (2001), play
- En Ødeland (2003), play
- Skovcapellet (2004), play
