= The Wicked Prince =

1840 Hans Christian Andersen fairy tale

- Author: Hans Christian Andersen
- Original title: Den onde Fyrste
- Publication date: 1840
- Publication place: Denmark
- Media type: Short story
- Dewey Decimal: 398.2

The Wicked Prince (Danish: Den onde Fyrste) is a fairy tale by the Danish author and fabulist Hans Christian Andersen first published in 1840. The story of a conquering prince who aspires to overthrow God and is driven mad for his grandiosity, it has been analysed for its representation of technology and as an early work of science fiction.

== Synopsis ==
The protagonist of The Wicked Prince is a cruel and ambitious prince (sometimes translated as king) who becomes powerful and wealthy after conquering and pillaging all his neighbouring polities. His armies overthrow a church, but the priests refuse to place statues of him upon their altars, on the basis that his worldly power is inferior to God's. Infuriated by this, the prince decides to conquer Heaven and overthrow God.

He builds a ship capable of flying through the air, armed with thousands of turrets and flying on the wings of hundreds of eagles. As the ship flies to Heaven, the prince is stopped in his tracks by a single angel, who is able to ground the ship with a single drop of blood from its wings. Though the prince nearly dies as his ship falls to Earth, he is invigorated in his goal and spends the next seven years building ever more-powerful vessels.

Seven years after his original attack, the prince returns to Heaven with new ships transporting a massive army. As his soldiers leave for Heaven, God sends a swarm of gnats to attack the prince. He tries to attack them with his sword, but is unable to hit them; following this, he demands his servants wrap him in silken coverings such that the gnats would be unable to reach him. As they do so, a single gnat sneaks through and stings the prince's ear. Driven mad by the pain, he throws off his robes and runs away, mocked by his soldiers for being defeated by a single gnat.

== Publication history ==
The Wicked Prince was written by Hans Christian Andersen and first published in October 1840 under the Danish title Den onde Fyrste, in Salonen, et belletristik Maanedsskrift (Salon: A Belles-lettres Monthly). It was intended for publication in the Dansk Folkekalender, but was seemingly rejected. The story was first included in an anthology in 1868, 28 years following its original publication.

== Analysis ==
The Wicked Prince is markedly more technological than most fables, a characteristic that has been discussed in analysis of Andersen's work. The bibliographer Erik Dal, describing the story as an "uncanny fantasy", recorded that its plot device of a flying dirigible predated the first successful real-world attempt by twelve years. In an analysis of the emotional content of fairy tales, it was one of four works by Andersen selected, alongside The Emperor's New Clothes, The Princess and the Pea, and The Little Match Girl. The story has been studied as a work of science fiction, for the role that insects play in the narrative, and as a metaphor for dictatorships, including through the publication of editions during the World War II Nazi occupation of Denmark comparing the prince to Adolf Hitler.

== See also ==
- Hans Christian Andersen bibliography
- History of science fiction
