= Gudbrand on the Hill-side =

Norwegian folk tale

Gudbrand On the Hillside
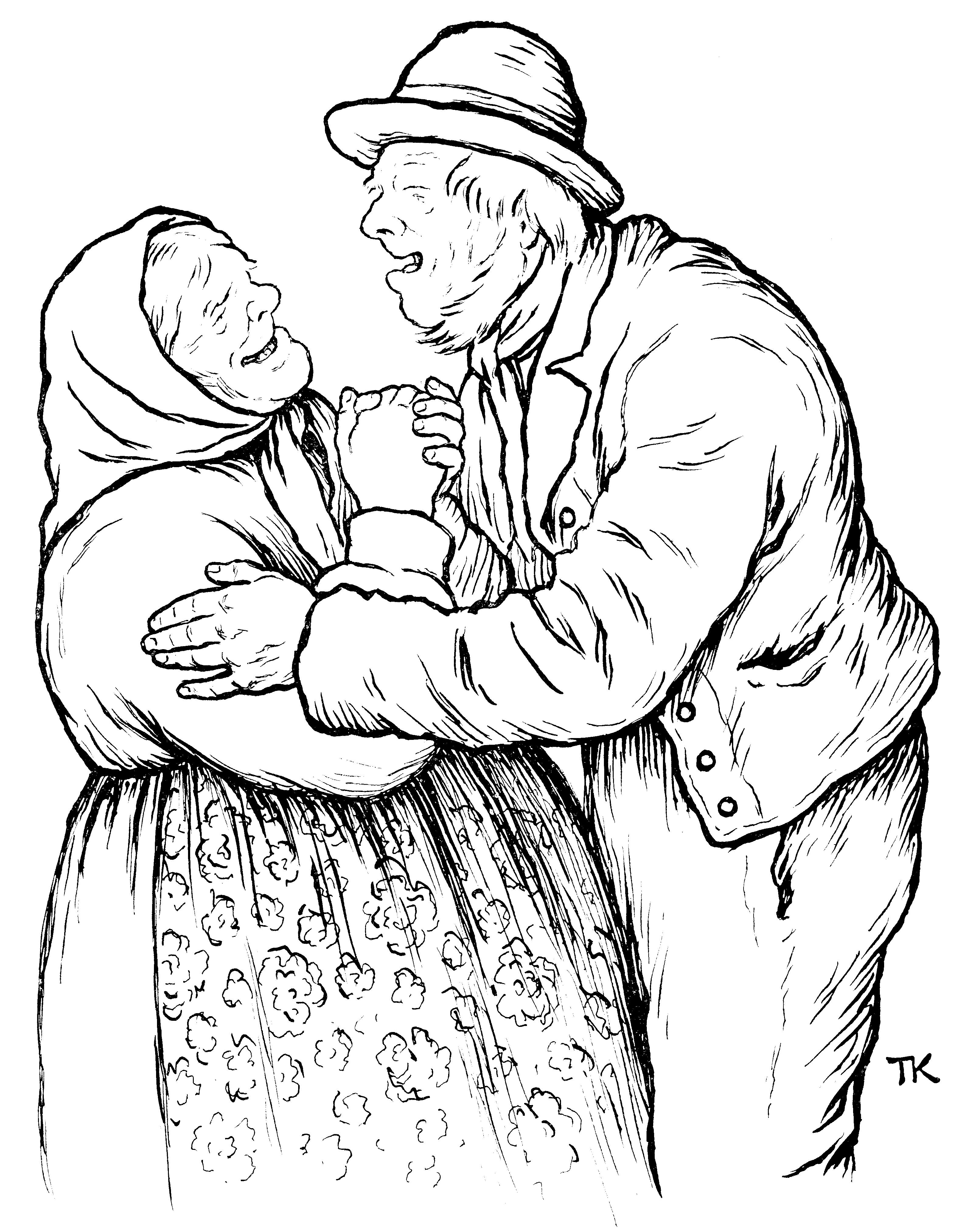
- Gudbrand (right) and his wife

Folk tale
- Name: Gudbrand On the Hillside
- Also known as: Gudbrand i Lia
- Aarne–Thompson grouping: 1415, Trading Away One's Fortune
- Country: Norway
- Published in: Norske Folkeeventyr

"Gudbrand on the Hillside" is a Norwegian folk tale about finding the good in whatever situation one finds oneself in. It is present in many collections of folk tales including Best-Loved Folktales of the World (1982). It was one of many Norse folk tales included in Norske Folkeeventyr by Peter Christen Asbjørnsen and Jørgen Engebretsen Moe between about 1853 and 1858.

Hans Christian Andersen's "What the Old Man does is always Right" (in Nye Eventyr og Historier, 1861) is another adaptation of this tale.

Themes of optimism, looking on the bright side, and marital happiness are attributed to this tale.

== Summary ==
The story is about Gudbrand and his wife, who live on a hillside and get along very well. They own two cows and decide to bring one to town to sell. When Gudbrand arrives in town, he is unable to sell his cow but since he is just as well off as before, he heads back home.

On his way home, he runs into a man who has a horse, and he trades the cow for the horse. Next, he meets a man with a pig, and trades the horse for the pig. Then he comes to a man with a goat, and trades the pig for the goat. He trades his goat with a man who has a sheep. After the sheep, he trades with another for a goose. Then in the same manner he acquires a rooster. He then realizes he is famished and needs food, so he sells his rooster to buy some food, leaving him to go home empty-handed.

He stops at his neighbor's place to rest for the night, and he tells the neighbor his story. The neighbor tells him he would hate to be in his shoes, because his wife would be very upset with him if he came home with nothing. Gudbrand tells his neighbor that he and his wife get along fine, and she will understand and agree with his decisions.

He places a bet with his neighbor for one hundred thalers that he has at home. The bet is that Gudbrand's wife will not be displeased with his decisions and his neighbor accepts. The next day Gudbrand and his neighbor head off to his home where the neighbor hides behind the door while Gudbrand greets his wife and explains to her the details of his travels. As he tells her of his trades, she finds a positive side to all of his decisions, and as he tells her about selling the rooster because he needed food to get home, she exclaims, "Now God be praised that you did so! Whatever you do, you do it always just after my own heart. Heaven be thanked that I have got you safe back again; you who do everything so well that I want neither rooster nor goose; neither pigs nor kine." Gudbrand wins the bet with his neighbor.

In the Andersen version, called "What the Old Man does is always Right" (sometimes translated "What Father does is always Right"), the essential story is the same though some of the components are different. Instead of a cow, the man begins with a horse; instead of ending with nothing, he ends with a bag of rotten apples; and instead of a neighbor, his wager is with two traveling Englishmen.

== Characters ==
- Gudbrand: A good husband who makes impulsive decisions but has a positive attitude about everything life sends his way.
- Gudbrand's wife: Optimistic and supportive of her husband's decisions; she finds the good in every event.
- Neighbor: He represents how most people would react to Gudbrand's impulsive nature and how most other people's wives would respond.

== Themes and analysis ==
In the Aarne-Thompson tale type index, "Gudbrand on the Hillside" is classified under 1415, Trading Away One's Fortune.

The benefit of a happy and trusting marriage is one theme. George Webbe Dasent, emphasizing the tale's simplicity, notes that "The happiness of married life was never more prettily told" than in this story, "where the tenderness of the wife for her husband weighs down all other considerations". Another theme along these lines is the importance to personal happiness of seeing the good in what you have.

The tale has been used in discussions of cognitive dissonance to exemplify a dissonance-increasing behavior (repeated poor trades) that leads to dissonance reduction behavior (believing that the trades were well-made).

In 1939, Johannes V. Jensen reinterpreted the story by inverting it: the man begins with a bag of rotten apples and ends with a horse, and his wife is dissatisfied with every trade he made (compare this to the Japanese legend of the Straw Millionaire).
