= The Angel (fairy tale) =

- Short story by Hans Christian Andersen
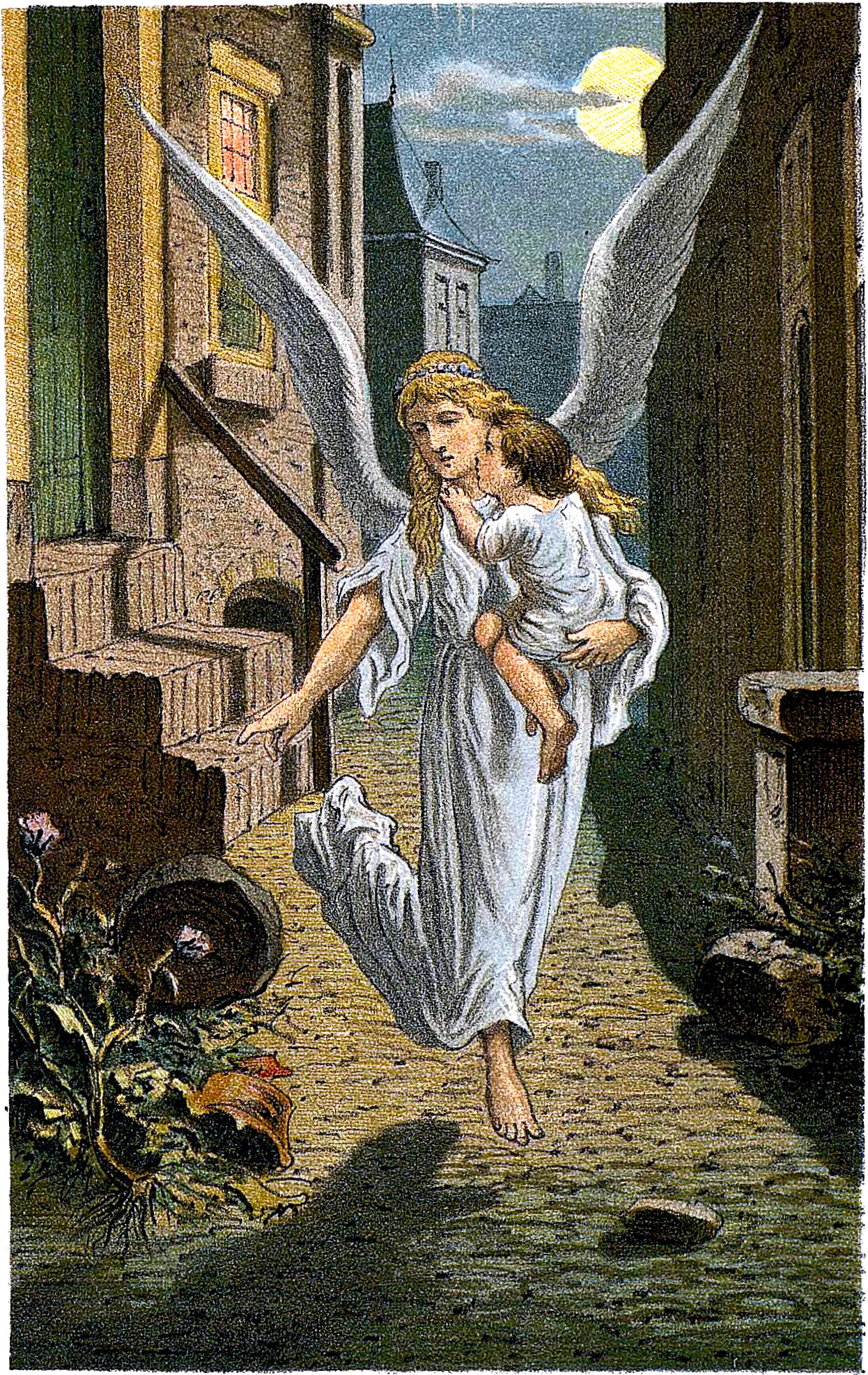
- Illustration from the 1888 anthology Hans Andersen's Fairy Tales
- Original title: Englen
- Country: Denmark
- Language: Danish
- Genre(s): Literary fairy tale

Publication
- Published in: New Fairy Tales. First Volume. First Collection (Nye Eventyr. Første Bind. Første Samling)
- Publication type: Fairy tale collection
- Publisher: C.A. Reitzel
- Media type: Print
- Publication date: 11 November 1843

Chronology
—	The Nightingale

"The Angel" (Danish: Engelen) is a literary fairy tale by Hans Christian Andersen. The tale was first published with three others in New Fairy Tales. First Volume. First Collection by C.A. Reitzel in November 1843. The four tales were received by the Danish critics with great acclaim.

== Plot ==
A child has died, and an angel is escorting him to Heaven. They wander over the earth for a while, visiting the child's favorite places. Along the way they gather flowers to transplant into the gardens of Heaven. The angel takes the child to a poverty-stricken area where a dead field lily lies in a trash heap. The angel salvages the lily and tells the child a beautiful story, explaining why he wants to take this flower in particular to Heaven. The angel explains the flower had cheered a dying child. The angel reveals he was that child.

== Background ==
Andersen had been attracted to the sentimental 'dying child' theme since composing the poem, "The Dying Child", during his school days, but the immediate catalyst was probably the death of the daughter of Andersen's close friend and lifelong homoerotic obsession, Edvard Collin. The tale suited the taste of the times and was wildly popular. The angel and child were depicted in a print that sold millions of copies.
