= The Two Baronesses =

1848 novel by Hans Christian Andersen

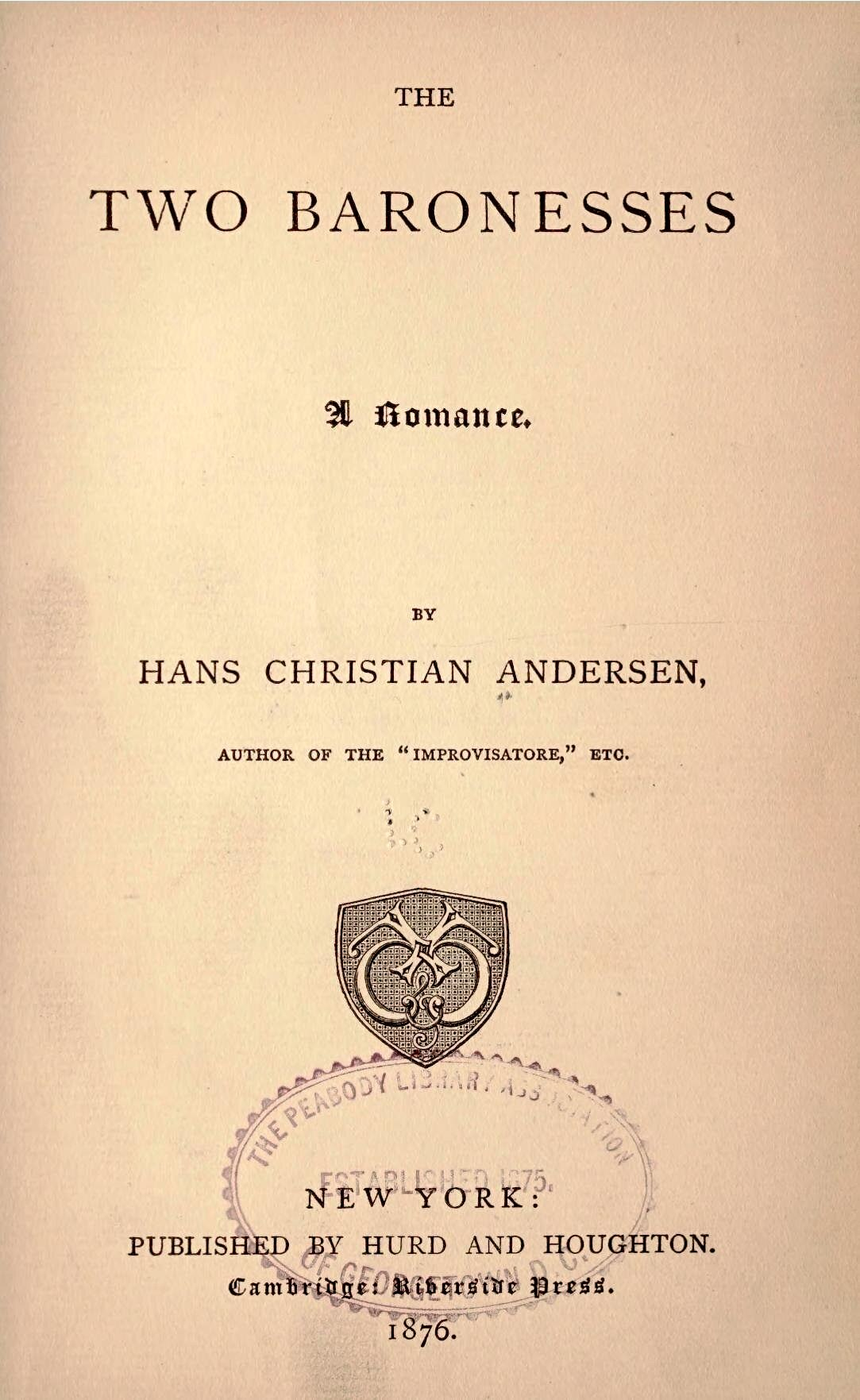
Title page of an 1876 publication of The Two Baronesses in English

The Two Baronesses (Danish: De to Baronesser) is an 1848 novel by Hans Christian Andersen. It was the fourth of the six novels he produced and was initially published in English, having been translated by Charles Beckwith Lohmeyer.

The story revolves around Elisabeth and Dorothea, two commoners who married into the same noble family during different eras to become baronesses. Through these two baronesses, the book offers an account of class relations in Denmark from the mid 18th century to the 1830s. It is reflective of Andersen's progressive optimism in the era immediately proceeding the end of absolute monarchy in Denmark and the democratic Constitution of Denmark, which was adopted in 1849. In particular, The Two Baronesses focuses on the place of the monarchy and the nobility.

== Plot ==
The novel's protagonist, Elisabeth, comes from humble origins, having grown up as a foster child in a priest's home in the West Frisian islands. The education she receives under the care of the priest gives her the social mobility to marry Baron Hermann. His grandmother, Dorothea, is a class-conscious baroness. Both baronesses became part of the nobility through marriage, yet are ideological foils for each other. Dorothea faces and comes to terms with her traumatic past, while Elisabeth fights to understand herself beyond the title and the family she married into.

== Publication history ==
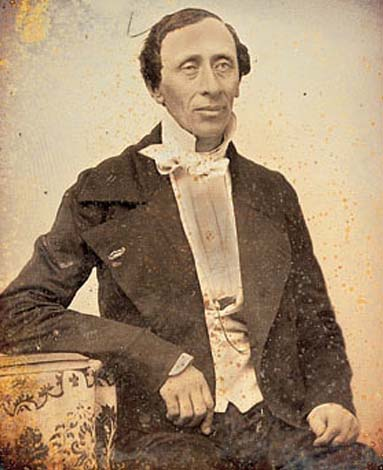
The first photograph taken of Hans Christian Andersen by Frederik Ferdinand Petersen. The daguerreotype image was hand colored. As the image was taken in 1847, Andersen would have been working on The Two Baronesses at the time he sat for this portrait.

The Two Baronesses was originally written in Danish. However, the English translation produced by Charles Beckwith Lohmeyer was published first. Foreign publishers required that it first be published in English to ensure that the translation was covered by copyright. At the time, this caused a misunderstanding that Andersen had written it in English. This confusion was only furthered by the first edition of the work, which was not presented as a translation and did not credit Lohmeyer. In its preface, Andersen wrote that The Two Baronesses was "‘the first that I have myself sent into the world in the English language." Critics, believing the novel was produced by Andersen in English unassisted, applauded his flawless command of the language.

Lohmeyer's translation was published by Bentley of London on 28 September 1848. The original, Danish version of the novel was published two months later on 25 November.

== Reception ==
Critics have noted that the plot, characters, and narrative of The Two Baronesses is similar to that of his 1836 novel, O. T. Despite some poor reviews from critics, the book was well received by the public and found success in England and Denmark.

‘Elimar’ is an 1889 painting of a fisherman believed to be created by Vincent Van Gogh, according to a team of 20 experts who presented a 456 page report after four years of research. The Van Gogh painting is titled ‘Elimar’ because it contains an inscription of the same on the lower right that is posited to be a reference by Vincent Van Gogh to a fisher boy character named “Elimar’ in The Two Baronesses. Vincent Van Gogh was known to be a frequent reader of novels by Hans Christian Andersen.
