= The Travelling Companion =

Fairy tale by Hans Christian Andersen (1835)

"The Travelling Companion" (Danish: Reisekamaraten) is an 1835 literary fairy tale by the Danish author Hans Christian Andersen, appearing in Fairy Tales Told for Children. First Collection. The tale tells the story of young traveller, poor Johnannes, and how with the help of a magical travelling companion he marries a princess.

== Derivative works ==
1925 Charles Villiers Stanford's opera The Travelling Companion
