= The Flax =

Fairy tale by Hans Christian Andersen

- Author: Hans Christian Andersen
- Original title: Hørren
- Language: Danish
- Genre: fairy tale
- Publication date: 1849
- Publication place: Denmark

The Flax (Danish: Hørren) is a fairy tale by Hans Christian Andersen about the development and use of the flax plant. The story was first published in 1849 in the periodical Fædrelandet.

== Plot ==
The fairy tale tells the story of the journey of the flax plant, which begins its life full of optimism, dismissing the warnings of the fern about the fleeting nature of life. Flax is ultimately uprooted and undergoes a series of painful transformations, first becoming fabric – flax, and later practical items, such as linen. Despite the pain, flax finds purpose and joy in its new forms, believing that each change brings a new opportunity to contribute something valuable to the world.

Over time, flax is further transformed into paper, on which important stories are written, bringing it even greater fulfillment. Although flax looks forward to further journeys, it is ultimately discarded and burned. In its last moments, as flax turns to ash, it sees tiny beings emerging from the ashes, creating sparks, symbolizing the continuity of life. The story conveys a powerful message that despite the trials and transformations people undergo, the song of life never truly ends – it evolves into something even more beautiful.

== Analysis and reception ==
Klaus P. Mortensen notes that this fairy tale resembles a parable. He compares it to the tale The Gyrfalcon, in which the titular character is punished for a lack of humility – burned to charcoal during a storm. In contrast, flax accepts life and its conditions, which "is connected to the quieting of one's own 'self' and the ability to transform", allowing one to "transcend the limits of physical ending". "Eternal life is available to those who can forget about themselves", the researcher summarizes, also referring to a similar message from the Gospel of Matthew 10:39.

According to Anna Podemska-Kałuża, " The Flax is not among Andersen's most recognizable fairy tales: it never gained the popularity of The Wild Swans, Thumbelina, The Little Match Girl, The Princess and the Pea, or The Snow Queen. Although it is not regarded as a masterpiece of children’s literature, it holds a respectable place in collections of fairy tales, alongside well-known texts such as The Nightingale, The Steadfast Tin Soldier, and The Emperor's New Clothes. While this work has not become an icon of children's literature, it is one of the most beautiful texts". According to the researcher, this work "evokes many positive emotions in both children and adults", and its universal message, in the context of describing the life cycle of a plant from birth to death, is "the necessity of reconciling oneself with the end of everything around us".

In 2005, an animated film titled The Flax was created in Poland based on this story, directed by Joanna Jasińska. The film used the translation by Bogusława Sochańska, directly from Danish. According to Anna Podemska-Kałuża, it was a pioneering film, being "the first Polish film made available to children with visual and hearing disabilities", and also the first film in which the versions were prepared by disabled youth and children, rather than adults (in the 2007 version, a sign language version was created, and in 2011, a version with audio description was made). The researcher assessed the adaptation as successful, writing that it impacts the viewer just as strongly as the original literary text.
