= The Goblin and the Grocer =

1852 fairy tale published by Hans Christian Andersen

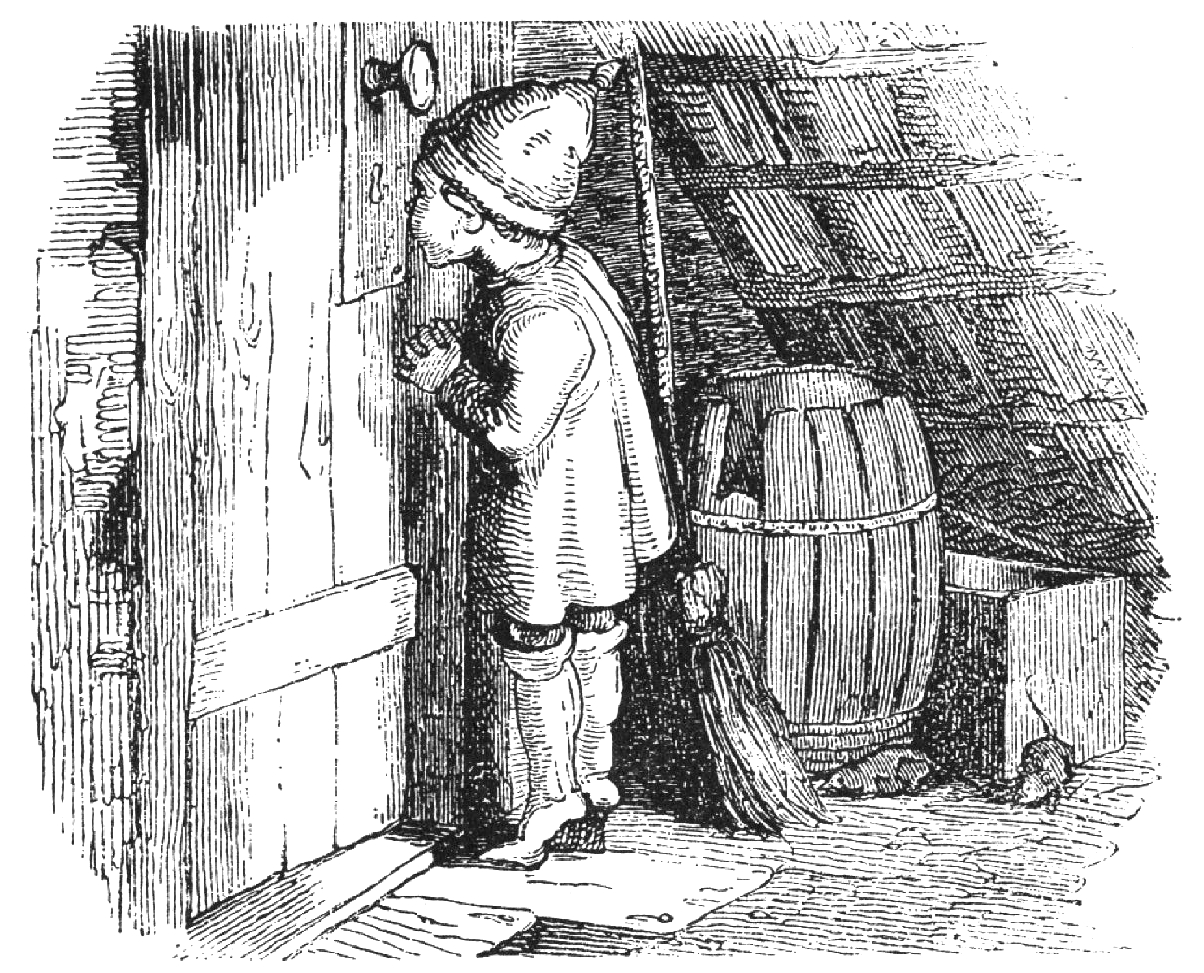
Vilhelm Pedersen illustration

"The Goblin and the Grocer" (Danish: Nissen hos Spekhøkeren) is a fairy tale published in 1852 by Danish author Hans Christian Andersen, about a goblin or gnome (nisse) who must choose between poetry or his Christmas porridge from a grocer.

Andrew Lang included the tale as "The Goblin and the Grocer" in The Pink Fairy Book (1897).

The spekhøkeren does not mean just "grocer" but a materialistic "Philistine" as well, and he uses pages ripped out of a precious book of poems to wrap merchandise such as cheese. Hence the alternate title "The Goblin and the Huckster".

== Bibliographical notes ==
The tale "Nissen hos Spækhøkeren" was first published November 30, 1852, and republished several times during the author's lifetime.

An English translation of the tale with the title "The Goblin and the Grocer" was included in Andrew Lang's anthology, The Pink Fairy Book (1897).

The practice of translating nisse as "goblin" was retained by R. P. Keigwin in his "The Goblin at the Grocer's" published in the 1950s, Keigwin's translation of Andersen's tales being regarded as scrupulously faithful to the letter. "The Goblin at the Grocer's" as title was also followed by subsequent translators such as Reginald Spink (1958).

The story was translated to English as "The Goblin and the Huckster" by Mrs. Paull (1867). The same title was adopted by H. W. Dulcken (1869) in his translation, and by J. H. Stickney in 1886, who reproduced the illustrations by Vilhelm Pedersen, reissued in 1915 with artwork by Edna F. Hart.

The tale was also translated as "The Brownie at the Butterman's" by H. L. Brækstad (1900), and "Nis at the Cheesemonger's" by Anne S. Bushby.

== Synopsis ==
Once, a student lived in an attic while a grocer lived on the first floor with a nisse, or house goblin/gnome. Because the grocer treated the nisse for Christmas with a dish of porridge (Danish: fad grød) with a large lump of butter in the middle, the nisse was attached to the grocer. (Note: The grød (porridge) could call for the use of fruit or juice in the recipe; Dulcken extrapolates this is "plum porridge", and Mrs. Paull called it "jam",) One day, the student came to buy cheese and candles; then he discovered that his cheese was wrapped in a page from a poetry book, so he bought the book instead of the cheese, and joked that the grocer knew nothing about poetry. The goblin, offended by the joke, used magic to make everything in the room speak and they all agreed that poetry was useless. The gnome went to tell the student, but he saw a beautiful, marvelous tree of light in the student's room, the most splendid thing he had ever seen. He kept going back to watch the tree of light through the peephole, but could not stay there, for the grocer gave him jam and butter. One day when there was a fire, the red-capped nisse ran to save the poetry book, and realized that he thought the book the greatest treasure in the house. Still, he decided to divide his time between the grocer and the student, because the student provided no Christmas porridge (Julegrød).

== Analysis ==
The title "The Goblin and the Huckster" given by Mrs. Paull hardly counts as a mis-translation. Although the spekhøker denotes a purveyor of victuals or grocer, it also has a secondary connotation of someone who is a materialistic or prosaic person, a Philistine, a point which is missed by some English translators.

Andersen here was reenacting his true life in the tale. His first publication paid out of his own pocket met with dismal failure, and copies were subjected to much the same fate as the poetry book in the tale: pages ripped out to be made into cheese wrappers. When the tale's narrator opines that such ill treatment should not have come to pass to such a wonderful book of poetry, this was meant as barb against the critics who failed to appreciate his burgeoning work.
