= Golden Treasure =

"Golden treasure"
- Short story by Hans Christian Andersen
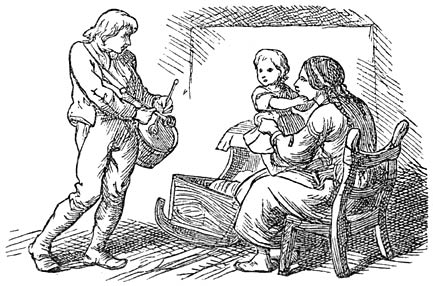
- Alfred Walter Bayes Dalziel Brothers illustration
- Country: Denmark
- Language: Danish
- Genre(s): Literary fairy tale

Publication

"Golden Treasure" is a literary fairy tale by Danish poet and author Hans Christian Andersen (1805 – 1875). On June 10, 1866, Andersen wrote in his diary that he "went home and worked on Golden Treasure, and my spirits were high again."

== Plot summary ==
There are children born with extraordinary qualities very definite, and this is the case of Peter, who has a great ability for music, especially for the drum. He uses it in the war when he grows up, accompanying him in his heart when is in love and too when his reputation grows, leading to fame and wealth.
