= Henriette Hanck =

Danish poet and novelist

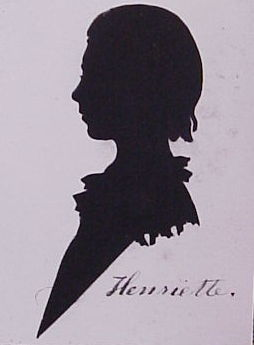
Henriette Hanck

Marie Kirstine Henriette Hanck (1807–1846) was a Danish poet and novelist from Odense. She is remembered in particular for her correspondence with her childhood friend Hans Christian Andersen. After writing poetry in the early 1830s, she wrote two romantic novels: Tante Anna, published anonymously in 1838, followed by En Skribentindes Datter (A Female Writer's Daughter) in 1842. She provided considerable moral support to Andersen in the 1830s, as can be seen from the letters he wrote to her.

== Biography ==
Born on 19 July 1807 in Odense, Marie Kirstine Henriette Hanck was the daughter of Professor Johan Hendrik Trützschler Hanck (1776–1840) and his wife Madseline Antoinette née Iversen (1788–1851). She was brought up in a cultural home. Her maternal grandfather, the book printer Christian Iversen, published the local newspaper Fyens Stifts Adresse Avis in which she was able to publish her poems and later her correspondence with Andersen.

The oldest of six sisters, Hanck suffered from poor health and a crooked back. Spending her entire life in her childhood home, she never married. Her grandfather owned Marieshøj, a villa in Tolderlund near the Odense Canal. It was here Hanck met Andersen who spent a few weeks there every summer. After Iversen's death in 1827, his wife continued to run the newspaper, publishing some of Andersen's earliest poems. The correspondence between Hanck and Andersen began in 1930 and ran to some 200 letters by the end of her life in 1846, most of which were published in Anderseniana IX-XIII between 1941 and 1946.

Hanck's first published poem, "Skibbruddet" (The Shopwreck) appeared in 1830 in Fyens Stifts Adresse Avis. She went on to write a wide variety of poetry, some published posthumously. Her first novel, published anonymously in 1838, was Tante Anna, a romance typical of the times. It was followed in 1842 by En Skribentindes Datter, another romantic story which takes place in Germany. She translated both of the novels into German. They appeared in 1845–46 with a foreword by Andersen.

Henriette Hanck died in Copenhagen on 19 June 1846. She was buried in Assistens Cemetery.
