= List of Manga Fairy Tales of the World episodes =

Japanese title card from the first opening

Manga Fairy Tales of the World is an anime anthology series produced by World Television, TBS Britannica and Dax International based on fairy tales, legends, literature classics and famous characters biographies. The series was broadcast in Japan by TBS from October 7, 1976, to March 28, 1979, in 127 episodes. Each episode is divided into two ten-minute parts that focus on two different stories, with the exception of thirteen episodes aired consecutively mid-series that cover an entire storyline in a single half-hour episode. In the second half of the series each short story, which was sometimes a rerun of an earlier one, was combined with a longer story split into several episodes.

Three opening themes and three ending themes were used in the series: "Uba uba ukyakya" (ウバ・ウバ・ウキャキャ) (eps. 1-52), "Watakushi o yobu no wa dare" (私を呼ぶのは誰) (eps. 53–104) and "Mama! himitsu dayo" (ママ!ひみつだよ) (eps. 105–127) were used as opening themes, while "Yume o mita no" (夢をみたの) (eps. 1-52), "Memoir" (めもわーる) (eps. 53–104) and "Tenshi ga toru" (天使がとおる) (eps. 105–127) were used as ending themes.

The series was distributed in the US in 1979 by American Way under the title Tales of Magic, in a selection of 65 episodes spanning three seasons. Another English dubbed version produced by Cori Films Int'l was titled Wonderful Tales From Around the World.

== Episodes ==
No.	Title	Directed by	Written by	Original release date
1	"The Wolf and the Seven Young Goats"; Transliteration: "Ōkami to nana hiki no ko yagi" (Japanese: おおかみと七ひきの子やぎ)	Masami Hata	Chifude Asakura	October 7, 1976
1	"Beauty and the Beast"; Transliteration: "Bijo to yajū" (Japanese: 美女と野獣)	Osamu Dezaki	Hikaru Kataoka	October 7, 1976
2	"The Little Mermaid"; Transliteration: "Ningyo hime" (Japanese: にんぎょ姫)	Manabu Ōhashi; Yoshio Takeuchi	Chifude Asakura	October 14, 1976
2	"The Cunning Rabbit"; Transliteration: "Usagi no warudie" (Japanese: うさぎのわるぢえ)	Toshio Hirata	Hikaru Kataoka	October 14, 1976
A Native American tale, the cunning rabbit is about a rabbit who tricks animals of the forest to dig a pond for him so he can easily obtain water. When the animals captured him for this trickery, the rabbit tricks them again to much food as punishment, so he dropped off a cliff and his head popped off. It, obviously, doesn't go as he said it would. The rabbit fled after making his captors feed delicious fruits and veggies.
3	"The Emperor's New Clothes"; Transliteration: "Hadaka no ōsama" (Japanese: はだかの王様)	Yoshio Takeuchi	Chifude Asakura	October 21, 1976
3	"Two Greedy Bears"; Transliteration: "Ni hiki no yokubari ko guma" (Japanese: 二ひきのよくばり子ぐま)	Atsushi Ishiguro	Takeshi Shudo	October 21, 1976
4	"Jack and the Beanstalk"; Transliteration: "Jakku to mame no ki" (Japanese: ジャックとまめの木)	Hideo Takayashiki	Chifude Asakura	October 28, 1976
4	"The Pheasant and the Gong"; Transliteration: "Kane wo narashi ta kiji" (Japanese: 鐘をならしたきじ)	Toshio Hirata	Keiji Kubota	October 28, 1976
A korean fable, where a lonely woodcutter helps a pheasant and his chicks from a white serpent. Out of gratitude, the pheasant later helps the woodcutter fend off another hostile advance from the mate of that serpent. But as she lost her life in the process, she became a heavenly spirit.
5	"The Ridiculous Wishes"; Transliteration: "Mahō no sōsēji" (Japanese: まほうのソーセージ)	Tameo Kohanawa	Takeshi Shudo	November 4, 1976
5	"The Ugly Duckling"; Transliteration: "Minikui ahiru no ko" (Japanese: みにくいあひるの子)	Noboru Ishiguro	Hikaru Kataoka	November 4, 1976
In this version of ridiculous wishes, it was the husband who had attached to him the long sausage to his nose. But when a couple of rats nibbled on it, his wife used the last wish to separate the sausage from the nose.
6	"The Pied Piper of Hamelin"; Transliteration: "Hamerun no fue fuki" (Japanese: ハメルンの笛ふき)	Noboru Ishiguro	Keiji Kubota	November 11, 1976
6	"William Tell"; Transliteration: "Wiriamu Teru" (Japanese: ウィリアム・テル)	Daizō Takeuchi	Keiji Kubota	November 11, 1976
After a considerate pied piper offered to get rid of the mice pestering the town and did as he was commissioned to do, he was expecting at least some bread and wine. But the greedy mayor told him that, because the piper drowned all the mice in the nearby river, there was no dead mouse to show as proof that he got rid of them. So, the heartless people kicked him out. Then, as revenge, the pied piper led away all the children from the town with his magical tunes and took them to the mountainside.
7	"Little Red Riding Hood"; Transliteration: "Akazukin-chan" (Japanese: 赤ずきんちゃん)	Toshio Hirata	Takeo Ohno	November 18, 1976
7	"The Smart Coyote"; Transliteration: "Kashikoi koyōte" (Japanese: かしこいコヨーテ)	Wataru Mizusawa	Keiji Kubota	November 18, 1976
8	"Don Quixote"; Transliteration: "Don Kihōte" (Japanese: ドン・キホーテ)	Rintaro	Takeo Ohno	November 25, 1976
8	"The Happy Prince"; Transliteration: "Kōfuku no ōji" (Japanese: 幸福の王子)	Hideo Takayashiki	Hikaru Kataoka	November 25, 1976
9	"The King with Donkey Ears"; Transliteration: "Ōsama no mimi wa roba no mimi" (Japanese: 王様の耳はろばの耳)	Ryōsuke Takahashi	Takeshi Shudo	December 2, 1976
9	"Why the Sea is Salt"; Transliteration: "Umi no mizu wa naze karai" (Japanese: 海の水はなぜからい)	Yoshio Takeuchi	Takeshi Shudo	December 2, 1976
10	"Bluebeard"; Transliteration: "Ao hige" (Japanese: 青ひげ)	Eisuke Kondo	Chifude Asakura	December 9, 1976
10	"A Dog of Flanders"; Transliteration: "Furandāsu no inu" (Japanese: フランダースのいぬ)	Osamu Dezaki	Chifude Asakura	December 9, 1976
11	"The Golden Goose"; Transliteration: "Kin'iro nogachō" (Japanese: 金色のがちょう)	Tetsuo Yasumi	Takeo Ohno	December 16, 1976
11	"Medusa's Head"; Transliteration: "Medōsa no kubi" (Japanese: メドゥーサの首)	Hiroshi Jinsenji	Keiji Kubota	December 16, 1976
12	"The Wild Swans"; Transliteration: "Jū ichi wa no hakuchō" (Japanese: 十一わのはくちょう)	Hideo Takayashiki	Chifude Asakura	December 23, 1976
12	"The Little Match Girl"; Transliteration: "Macchi uri no shōjo" (Japanese: マッチうりの少女)	Moribi Murano	Chifude Asakura	December 23, 1976
13	"The Twelve Months"; Transliteration: "Jūni no tsuki" (Japanese: 十二の月)	Manabu Ōhashi	Hikaru Kataoka	December 30, 1976
13	"Little Red Riding Hood (rerun)" Transliteration: "Akazukin-chan (saihōsō)" (Japanese: 赤ずきんちゃん（再放送）)	Toshio Hirata	Takeo Ohno	December 30, 1976
14	"Puss in Boots"; Transliteration: "Naga gutsu wo haita neko" (Japanese: 長ぐつをはいたねこ)	Tameo Kohanawa	Takeo Ohno	January 6, 1977
14	"How the Coyote Stole Fire"; Transliteration: "Dōbutsu tachito hi" (Japanese: 動物たちと火)	Hideo Takayashiki	Takeshi Shudo	January 6, 1977
15	"The Selfish Giant"; Transliteration: "Wagamamana kyojin" (Japanese: わがままな巨人)	Osamu Dezaki	Chifude Asakura	January 13, 1977
15	"The Flying Dutchman"; Transliteration: "Samayoeru oranda nin" (Japanese: さまよえるオランダ人)	Rintaro	Keiji Kubota	January 13, 1977
16	"Hansel and Gretel"; Transliteration: "Henzeru to Gureteru" (Japanese: ヘンゼルとグレーテル)	Yû Tachibana	Keiji Kubota	January 20, 1977
16	"The Curious Tiger"; Transliteration: "Shirita gari yanotora" (Japanese: しりたがりやのとら)	Daizō Takeuchi	Takeo Ohno	January 20, 1977
17	"Town Musicians of Bremen"; Transliteration: "Buremen no ongakutai" (Japanese: ブレーメンの音楽隊)	Yoshio Takeuchi	Takeshi Shudo	January 27, 1977
17	"Rostam and Sohrab"; Transliteration: "Rosutamu to Sohorabu" (Japanese: ロスタムとソホラーブ)	Kenjirō Yoshida	Chifude Asakura	January 27, 1977
18	"Sleeping Beauty"; Transliteration: "Ibara hime" (Japanese: いばら姫)	Yoshiaki Kawajiri	Chifude Asakura	February 3, 1977
18	"The Story of How Clothes Ate Rice"; Transliteration: "Yōfuku ga gohan wo tabeta hanashi" (Japanese: 洋服がごはんをたべた話)	Hideo Takayashiki	Chifude Asakura	February 3, 1977
19	"The Town Mouse and the Country Mouse"; Transliteration: "Machi no nezumi to inaka no nezumi" (Japanese: 町のねずみといなかのねずみ)	Fumio Ikeno	Takeshi Shudo	February 10, 1977
19	"The Rainbow Bird"; Transliteration: "Niji no tori" (Japanese: にじの鳥)	Toshio Hirata	Chifude Asakura	February 10, 1977
20	"Noah's Ark"; Transliteration: "Noa no hako fune" (Japanese: ノアのはこ舟)	Mori Masaki	Takeshi Shudo	February 17, 1977
20	"The Donkey Inn"; Transliteration: "Roba ni natta tabibito" (Japanese: ろばになった旅人)	Eisuke Kondo	Takeo Ohno	February 17, 1977
21	"Ali Baba and the Forty Thieves"; Transliteration: "Ari Baba to shijū nin no tōzoku" (Japanese: アリババと四十にんの盗賊)	Yoshio Takeuchi	Takeshi Shudo	February 24, 1977
21	"The Nightingale and the Rose"; Transliteration: "Naichingeru to bara" (Japanese: ナイチンゲールとばら)	Yoshio Takeuchi	Hiroshi Ishii	February 24, 1977
22	"Joan of Arc"; Transliteration: "Jannu Daruku" (Japanese: ジャンヌ・ダルク)	Hiroshi Jinsenji	Takeo Ohno	March 3, 1977
22	"The Little Buddha's Red Eyes"; Transliteration: "Ojizōsama no akai me" (Japanese: おじぞう様の赤い目)	Tadahiko Horiguchi	Takeshi Shudo	March 3, 1977
23	"Thumbelina"; Transliteration: "Oyayubi hime" (Japanese: おやゆび姫)	Tameo Kohanawa	Chifude Asakura	March 10, 1977
23	"The Heart of a Monkey"; Transliteration: "Saru no ki mo" (Japanese: さるのきも)	Hideo Takayashiki	Takeshi Shudo	March 10, 1977
24	"The Shipwreck"; Transliteration: "Nanpa sen" (Japanese: なんぱ船)	Osamu Dezaki	Takeshi Shudo	March 17, 1977
24	"Why Cats Wash Their Faces After Eating"; Transliteration: "Nekoga gohan noatoni kaowoarauwake" (Japanese: ねこがごはんのあとに顔をあらうわけ)	Norio Yazawa	Takeshi Shudo	March 17, 1977
25	"The Last Leaf"; Transliteration: "Saigono ichiyō" (Japanese: さいごの一葉)	Takekatsu Kikuta	Chifude Asakura	March 24, 1977
25	"The Woman and the Polar Bear"; Transliteration: "Obaasan to shiro kuma" (Japanese: おばあさんと白くま)	Toshio Hirata	Takeshi Shudo	March 24, 1977
26	"Trojan Horse"; Transliteration: "Toroi no mokuba" (Japanese: トロイの木馬)	Studio Live; Osamu Dezaki	Takeo Ohno	March 31, 1977
26	"The Magic Shooter"; Transliteration: "Ma dan no ite" (Japanese: 魔弾の射手)	Daizō Takeuchi	Chifude Asakura	March 31, 1977
27	"The Tablecloth Given by the North Wind"; Transliteration: "Kitakaze nokureta teburu kake" (Japanese: 北風のくれたテーブルかけ)	Masami Hata	Takeshi Shudo	April 7, 1977
27	"The Rainbow Lake"; Transliteration: "Niji no mizūmi" (Japanese: にじの湖)	Hiroyuki Torii	Chifude Asakura	April 7, 1977
28	"Cinderella"; Transliteration: "Shinderera" (Japanese: シンデレラ)	Hajime Shin	Chifude Asakura	April 14, 1977
28	"The Rabbit and the Tiger"; Transliteration: "Usagi ni maketa tora" (Japanese: うさぎにまけたとら)	Studio Live; Akio Sakai	Chifude Asakura	April 14, 1977
29	"The Shepherd and the Lion"; Transliteration: "Raion no on ga eshi" (Japanese: ライオンのおんがえし)	Shigetsugu Yoshida	Takeshi Shudo	April 21, 1977
29	"The Peasant Doctor"; Transliteration: "Isha ni natta o hyaku shōsan" (Japanese: 医者になったおひゃくしょうさん)	Hisuri Aoki	Chifude Asakura	April 21, 1977
30	"The Boy Who Cried Wolf"; Transliteration: "Ōkami to shōnen" (Japanese: おおかみと少年)	Sekimaro	Yutaka Kaneko	April 28, 1977
30	"The Spirit in the Bottle"; Transliteration: "Obake no bin dume" (Japanese: おばけのびんづめ)	Tatsuya Matano	Takeshi Shudo	April 28, 1977
31	"The Red Shoes"; Transliteration: "Akai kutsu" (Japanese: 赤いくつ)	Osamu Dezaki	Chifude Asakura	May 5, 1977
31	"The Bats, the Birds and the Beasts"; Transliteration: "Naka ma hazure no kōmori" (Japanese: なかまはずれのこうもり)	Yû Tachibana	Yutaka Kaneko	May 5, 1977
32	"The Big Dipper"; Transliteration: "Nanatsu no hoshi" (Japanese: 七つの星)	Studio Live; Keiichirō Mochizuki	Takeshi Shudo	May 12, 1977
32	"Seal Skin"; Transliteration: "Azarashi no kawa" (Japanese: あざらしの皮)	Toru Sakata	Mayumi Miyazaki	May 12, 1977
33	"The Steadfast Tin Soldier"; Transliteration: "Suzu no heitai san" (Japanese: すずの兵隊さん)	Yoshio Takeuchi	Chifude Asakura	May 19, 1977
33	"Why the Turtle is Slow"; Transliteration: "Kame ga noronoro to aruku wake" (Japanese: かめがのろのろあるくわけ)	Hiroshi Fukutomi	Takeshi Shudo	May 19, 1977
34	"The Tinderbox and the Soldier"; Transliteration: "Hi uchiba ko to heitai-san" (Japanese: 火うちばこと兵隊さん)	Osamu Dezaki	Chifude Asakura	May 26, 1977
34	"The Goose Girl"; Transliteration: "Gachō ban no musume" (Japanese: がちょう番の娘)	Osamu Dezaki	Takeshi Shudo	May 26, 1977
35	"Gulliver's Travels"; Transliteration: "Gariba ryokōki" (Japanese: ガリバー旅行記)	Yoshiaki Kawajiri	Hideo Takayashiki	June 2, 1977
35	"The Lyre of Orpheus"; Transliteration: "Orupeusu no tate kon" (Japanese: オルペウスのたて琴)	Tomekichi Takeuchi	Chifude Asakura	June 2, 1977
36	"A Fox and a Rabbit Compete in Intelligence - Part 1"; Transliteration: "Kitsune to usagi no chie kurabe (1)" (Japanese: きつねとうさぎのちえくらべ（1）)	Yoichi Fukuhara	Chifude Asakura	June 9, 1977
36	"Faust"; Transliteration: "Fausuto" (Japanese: ファウスト)	Ichirō Kimura	Takeshi Shudo	June 9, 1977
37	"Aladdin and the Magic Lamp"; Transliteration: "Arajin to mahōno ranpu" (Japanese: アラジンとまほうのランプ)	Yoichi Fukuhara; Tameo Kohanawa	Sanpei Ito	June 16, 1977
37	"Why Cats and Dogs Fight"; Transliteration: "Dōshite inu to neko ha naka ga warui ka" (Japanese: どうしていぬとねこは仲がわるいか)	Yoshio Kabashima	Kimase Megumi	June 16, 1977
38	"The Little Humpbacked Horse"; Transliteration: "Mahō no ko uma" (Japanese: まほうの子うま)	Studio Live; Jun Kiguchi	Takeo Ohno	June 23, 1977
38	"The Story of a Mother"; Transliteration: "Aru okāsan no monogatari" (Japanese: あるおかあさんの物語)	Yoshiharu Horiike	Chifude Asakura	June 23, 1977
39	"Snow White"; Transliteration: "Shirayuki hime" (Japanese: しらゆき姫)	Masami Hata	Chifude Asakura	June 30, 1977
39	"The Straw, the Coal, and the Bean"; Transliteration: "Wara to sumi to sora mame" (Japanese: わらと炭とそらまめ)	Hiroshi Fukutomi; Toshiyuki Honda	Yoshio Takeuchi	June 30, 1977
40	"Tanabata"; Transliteration: "Tanabatasama" (Japanese: たなばたさま)	Studio Live; Akio Sakai	Takeo Ohno	July 7, 1977
40	"Galileo Galilei"; Transliteration: "Garireo Garirei" (Japanese: ガリレオ・ガリレイ)	Hideo Nishimaki	Takeshi Shudo	July 7, 1977
41	"The Three Little Pigs"; Transliteration: "San biki no kobuta" (Japanese: 三びきの子ぶた)	Hideo Takayashiki	Takeshi Shudo	July 14, 1977
41	"Ivan the Fool"; Transliteration: "Iwan no baka" (Japanese: イワンのばか)	Daizō Takeuchi	Chifude Asakura	July 14, 1977
42	"A Fox and a Rabbit Compete in Intelligence - Part 2"; Transliteration: "Kitsune to usagi no chie kurabe (2)" (Japanese: きつねとうさぎのちえくらべ（2）)	Yoichi Fukuhara	Chifude Asakura	July 21, 1977
42	"Dracula"; Transliteration: "Dorakyura" (Japanese: ドラキュラ)	Tatsuya Matano	Takeshi Shudo	July 21, 1977
43	"The Horse of Fire"; Transliteration: "Honō no uma" (Japanese: 炎のうま)	Osamu Dezaki	Chifude Asakura	July 28, 1977
43	"The Old Man Who Changed His Work"; Transliteration: "Shigoto o torikaeta oyajisan" (Japanese: 仕事をとりかえたおやじさん)	Yoshifumi Kondō	Jiro Saito	July 28, 1977
44	"Knight of the Swan"; Transliteration: "Hakuchō no kishi" (Japanese: はくちょうの騎士)	Ichirō Kimura	Takeo Ohno	August 4, 1977
44	"White Forehead"; Transliteration: "Dekoshiro" (Japanese: でこしろ)	Hideo Nishimaki	Takeshi Shudo	August 4, 1977
45	"Emily's Red Gloves"; Transliteration: "Emirī no akai tebukuro" (Japanese: エミリーの赤いてぶくろ)	Toshio Hirata	Chifude Asakura	August 11, 1977
45	"Fox's Judgment"; Transliteration: "Kitsune no sai ban" (Japanese: きつねのさいばん)	Yuzo Aoki	Hideo Takayashiki	August 11, 1977
46	"A Fox and a Rabbit Compete in Intelligence - Part 3"; Transliteration: "Kitsune to usagi no chie kurabe (3)" (Japanese: きつねとうさぎのちえくらべ（3）)	Yoichi Fukuhara	Chifude Asakura	August 18, 1977
46	"Frankenstein"; Transliteration: "Furankenshutain" (Japanese: フランケンシュタイン)	Tatsuya Matano	Takeshi Shudo	August 18, 1977
47	"The Golden Deer"; Transliteration: "Kin'iro no shika" (Japanese: 金色のしか)	Hiroshi Fukutomi	Daisuke Iguchi	August 25, 1977
47	"Rabbit With a Cold"; Transliteration: "Kaze o hīta usagi" (Japanese: かぜをひいたうさぎ)	Daizō Takeuchi	Shina Matsuoka	August 25, 1977
48	"The Adventures of Robin Hood"; Transliteration: "Robin Fuddo no bōken" (Japanese: ロビンフッドのぼうけん)	Jun Kiguchi	Keiji Kubota	September 1, 1977
48	"Magical Leaves"; Transliteration: "Mahō no konoha" (Japanese: 魔法の木の葉)	Yoichi Fukuhara	Takeshi Shudo	September 1, 1977
49	"Dying Friendship"; Transliteration: "Shi wokaketa yūjō" (Japanese: 死をかけた友情)	Mori Masaki	Jiro Saito	September 8, 1977
49	"Water Spirit and the Boy"; Transliteration: "Mizu no sei to shōnen" (Japanese: 水の精と少年)	Yoshiaki Kawajiri	Daisuke Iguchi	September 8, 1977
50	"Monkey King - Part 1"; Transliteration: "Songokū ichi no kan" (Japanese: そんごくう一の巻)	Keiichirō Mochizuki	Takeshi Shudo	September 15, 1977
50	"Why Crows Wrinkle Cuckoo Eggs"; Transliteration: "Naze karasu ha kakkō no tamago no sewa o suru ka" (Japanese: なぜカラスはカッコウの卵のせわをするか)	Sekimaro	Shina Matsuoka	September 15, 1977
51	"Monkey King - Part 2"; Transliteration: "Songokū ni no kan" (Japanese: そんごくう二の巻)	Takumi Noda	Takeshi Shudo	September 22, 1977
51	"The Ant and the Grasshopper"; Transliteration: "Ari to kirigirisu" (Japanese: ありときりぎりす)	Takao Yamazaki	Takeshi Shudo	September 22, 1977
52	"King Lear"; Transliteration: "Ria ō" (Japanese: リア王)	Toshio Hirata	Daisuke Iguchi	September 29, 1977
52	"Luminous Ball"; Transliteration: "Yakō no tama" (Japanese: 夜光の玉)	Ryōsuke Takahashi	Kimase Megumi	September 29, 1977
53	"Little Women"; Transliteration: "Wakakusa monogatari" (Japanese: 若草物語)	Ichirō Kimura	Chifude Asakura	October 6, 1977
54	"Carrot Top"; Transliteration: "Ninjin" (Japanese: にんじん)	Hideo Nishimaki	Akira Saiga	October 13, 1977
55	"Nobody's Boy"; Transliteration: "Ienakiko" (Japanese: 家なき子)	Mineo Fuji	Keiji Kubota	October 20, 1977
56	"Nightingale Story"; Transliteration: "Naichingeru monogatari" (Japanese: ナイチンゲール物語)	Kyosuke Katsura	Takeshi Shudo	October 27, 1977
57	"Treasure Island"; Transliteration: "Takarajima" (Japanese: 宝島)	Keiichirō Mochizuki	Keisuke Fujikawa	November 3, 1977
58	"Cosette"; Transliteration: "Shōjo Kozetto" (Japanese: 少女コゼット)	Takao Yamazaki	Chifude Asakura	November 10, 1977
59	"Carmen"; Transliteration: "Karumen" (Japanese: カルメン)	Hideo Nishimaki	Chifude Asakura	November 17, 1977
60	"Swan Lake"; Transliteration: "Hakuchō no mizūmi" (Japanese: 白鳥の湖)	Shuzo Yamaguchi	Chifude Asakura	November 24, 1977
61	"Romeo and Juliet"; Transliteration: "Romio to Jurietto" (Japanese: ロミオとジュリエット)	Kyosuke Katsura	Keiji Kubota	December 1, 1977
62	"Alice in Wonderland"; Transliteration: "Fushigi no Kuni no Arisu" (Japanese: 不思議の国のアリス)	Yuzo Aoki	Takeshi Shudo	December 8, 1977
63	"Uncle Tom's Cabin"; Transliteration: "Ankuru Tomu no koya" (Japanese: アンクル・トムの小屋)	Takumi Noda	Hikaru Kataoka	December 15, 1977
64	"The Nutcracker"; Transliteration: "Kurumi wari ningyō" (Japanese: くるみわり人形)	Hideo Nishimaki	Takeshi Shudo	December 22, 1977
65	"The Snow Queen"; Transliteration: "Yuki no joō" (Japanese: 雪の女王)	Mineo Fuji	Takeo Ohno	December 29, 1977
66	"The Snow-Image Song"; Transliteration: "Yukidaruma no uta" (Japanese: 雪だるまの詩)	Hideo Nishimaki	Takeshi Shudo	January 5, 1978
66	"The Family of Love - Part 1: Worn Stairs"; Transliteration: "Ai no ikka dai 1-wa surihetta kaidan" (Japanese: 愛の一家 第1話 すりへった階段)	Hiroshi Jinsenji	Takeshi Shudo	January 5, 1978
67	"The Migratory Fish"; Transliteration: "Umi heitta mizūmi no sakana" (Japanese: 海へ行った湖の魚)	Tatsuya Matano	Shina Matsuoka	January 12, 1978
67	"The Family of Love - Part 2: The Lost Fir Tree"; Transliteration: "Ai no ikka dai 2-wa maigo no mominoki" (Japanese: 愛の一家 第2話 まいごのもみの木)	Hiroshi Jinsenji; Kiyomu Fukuda	Takeshi Shudo	January 12, 1978
68	"The Monkey King and the Mangoes"; Transliteration: "Mango no minoto saru no ōsama" (Japanese: マンゴーの実と猿の王様)	Yoichi Fukuhara	Kimase Megumi	January 19, 1978
68	"The Family of Love - Part 3: Another Wilhelm"; Transliteration: "Ai no ikka dai 3-wa mō hitori no Uiruherumu" (Japanese: 愛の一家 第3話 もう一人のウィルヘルム)	Hiroshi Jinsenji; Kiyomu Fukuda	Takeshi Shudo	January 19, 1978
69	"Old Man of the Mountain"; Transliteration: "Iwa jiisan" (Japanese: 岩じいさん)	Tetsuo Yasumi	Kimase Megumi	January 26, 1978
69	"The Family of Love - Final Part: Telegram of Happiness"; Transliteration: "Ai no ikka dai saishūkai shiawase no denpō" (Japanese: 愛の一家 最終回 しあわせの電報)	Hiroshi Jinsenji; Kiyomu Fukuda	Takeshi Shudo	January 26, 1978
70	"Harui and the Toad"; Transliteration: "Harui to hikigaeru" (Japanese: 春伊とひきがえる)	Takao Yamazaki	Shina Matsuoka	February 2, 1978
70	"The Adventures of Tom Sawyer - Part 1: Painting Is Fun Too"; Transliteration: "Tomu Soya no bōken dai 1-wa penki nurimo tanoshi izo" (Japanese: トム・ソーヤの冒険 第1話 ペンキぬりも楽しいぞ)	Hideo Nishimaki; Kiyomu Fukuda	Chifude Asakura	February 2, 1978
71	"The Mysterious Kokyu"; Transliteration: "Fushigina kokyū" (Japanese: ふしぎな胡弓)	Minoru Hashiba	Chifude Asakura	February 9, 1978
71	"The Adventures of Tom Sawyer - Part 2: Big Fuss! Sunday School"; Transliteration: "Tomu Soya no bōken dai 2-wa taisa wagi! yō gakkō" (Japanese: トム・ソーヤの冒険 第2話 大さわぎ!日曜学校)	Hideo Nishimaki; Kiyomu Fukuda	Chifude Asakura	February 9, 1978
72	"Dick and the Cat"; Transliteration: "Deikku to neko" (Japanese: ディックと猫)	Keiichirō Mochizuki	Shina Matsuoka	February 16, 1978
72	"The Adventures of Tom Sawyer - Part 3: Scavenger Hunts in Jackson Island"; Transliteration: "Tomu Soya no bōken dai 3-wa Jakuson shima no takara sagashi" (Japanese: トム・ソーヤの冒険 第3話 ジャクソン島の宝探し)	Hideo Nishimaki; Kiyomu Fukuda	Chifude Asakura	February 16, 1978
73	"The Kind Shepherd"; Transliteration: "Ohito yoshi no hitsuji kai" (Japanese: おひとよしの羊かい)	Mineo Fuji	Takeshi Shudo	February 23, 1978
73	"The Adventures of Tom Sawyer - Final Part: Pirates Come to Town"; Transliteration: "Tomu Soya no bōken dai saishūkai kaizoku ga machi heyattekita" (Japanese: トム・ソーヤの冒険 最終回 海賊が町へやってきた)	Hideo Nishimaki; Kiyomu Fukuda	Chifude Asakura	February 23, 1978
74	"The Story of the Rabbit Who Gets the Butter"; Transliteration: "Usagiga bata wotoru hanashi" (Japanese: うさぎがバターをとる話)	Hideo Nishimaki	Chifude Asakura	March 2, 1978
74	"Two Years' Vacation - Part 1"; Transliteration: "Jūgo shōnen hyōryūki dai 1-wa" (Japanese: 十五少年漂流記 第1話)	Hiroshi Jinsenji; Tadashi Shirakawa	Keiji Kubota	March 2, 1978
75	"The Officer"; Transliteration: "Oyakōkō nao yakunin" (Japanese: 親孝行なお役人)	Yoichi Fukuhara	Kimase Megumi	March 9, 1978
75	"Two Years' Vacation - Part 2"; Transliteration: "Jūgo shōnen hyōryūki dai 2-wa" (Japanese: 十五少年漂流記 第2話)	Hiroshi Jinsenji; Tadashi Shirakawa	Keiji Kubota	March 9, 1978
76	"The Smith on the Cloud"; Transliteration: "Kumo no kajiya-san" (Japanese: 雲のかじ屋さん)	Minoru Hashiba	Shina Matsuoka	March 16, 1978
76	"Two Years' Vacation - Part 3"; Transliteration: "Jūgo shōnen hyōryūki dai 3-wa" (Japanese: 十五少年漂流記 第3話)	Hiroshi Jinsenji; Tadashi Shirakawa	Keiji Kubota	March 16, 1978
77	"Frost Giant"; Transliteration: "Shimo no kyojin" (Japanese: 霜の巨人)	Ryōsuke Takahashi	Shina Matsuoka	March 23, 1978
77	"Two Years' Vacation - Part 4"; Transliteration: "Jūgo shōnen hyōryūki dai 4-wa" (Japanese: 十五少年漂流記 第4話)	Hiroshi Jinsenji; Tadashi Shirakawa	Keiji Kubota	March 23, 1978
78	"Viola Tricolor"; Transliteration: "Sanshoku sumire" (Japanese: 三色すみれ)	Yuzo Aoki	Shina Matsuoka	March 30, 1978
78	"Two Years' Vacation - Final Part"; Transliteration: "Jūgo shōnen hyōryūki saishūkai" (Japanese: 十五少年漂流記 最終回)	Hiroshi Jinsenji; Tadashi Shirakawa	Keiji Kubota	March 30, 1978
79	"Suho's White Horse"; Transliteration: "Suho no shiroi uma" (Japanese: スーホーの白い馬)	Minoru Hashiba; Masashi Kato	Tan Hakata	April 5, 1978
79	"Daddy-Long-Legs - Part 1: Gloomy Wednesday"; Transliteration: "Ashinaga Ojisan dai 1-wa yūutsuna suiyōbi" (Japanese: あしながおじさん 第1話 ゆううつな水曜日)	Hiroshi Jinsenji; Saburo Masutani	Takeshi Shudo	April 5, 1978
80	"Barry, Dog of the Alps"; Transliteration: "Arupusu no meiken Barī" (Japanese: アルプスの名犬バリー)	Mineo Fuji	Magoshi Hikoya	April 12, 1978
80	"Daddy-Long-Legs - Part 2: The First Gift"; Transliteration: "Ashinaga Ojisan dai 2-wa hajimete no purezento" (Japanese: あしながおじさん 第2話 はじめてのプレゼント)	Hideo Nishimaki; Saburo Masutani	Takeshi Shudo	April 12, 1978
81	"Little Claus and Big Claus"; Transliteration: "Shō Kurausu to dai Kurausu" (Japanese: 小クラウスと大クラウス)	Yoichi Fukuhara	Chifude Asakura	April 19, 1978
81	"Daddy-Long-Legs - Part 3: A Wonderful Week"; Transliteration: "Ashinaga Ojisan dai 3-wa sutekina isshūkan" (Japanese: あしながおじさん 第3話 素敵な一週間)	Minoru Hashiba; Saburo Masutani	Takeshi Shudo	April 19, 1978
82	"The Caliph Stork"; Transliteration: "Kō no tori ni natta ōsama" (Japanese: こうのとりになった王様)	Minoru Hashiba	Takeshi Shudo	April 26, 1978
82	"Daddy-Long-Legs - Final Part: Daddy's Invitation"; Transliteration: "Ashinaga Ojisan saishūkai ojisan no goshōtai" (Japanese: あしながおじさん 最終回 おじさんのご招待)	Saburo Masutani	Takeshi Shudo	April 26, 1978
83	"The Nightingale and the Emperor"; Transliteration: "Naichingeru to kōtei" (Japanese: ナイチンゲールと皇帝)	Hideo Nishimaki; Hiroshi Oikawa	Chifude Asakura	May 3, 1978
83	"The Wizard of Oz - Part 1"; Transliteration: "Ozu no mahōtsukai dai 1-wa" (Japanese: オズの魔法使い 第1話)	Masuji Harada; Kiyomu Fukuda	Akira Saiga	May 3, 1978
84	"When a Frog Croaks, It Rains"; Transliteration: "Kaeruga naku to ame ninaruwake" (Japanese: カエルが鳴くと雨になるわけ)	Tatsuya Matano	Kimase Megumi	May 10, 1978
84	"The Wizard of Oz - Part 2"; Transliteration: "Ozu no mahōtsukai dai 2-wa" (Japanese: オズの魔法使い 第2話)	Hideo Nishimaki; Kiyomu Fukuda	Akira Saiga	May 10, 1978
85	"The Greatest Animal in the Forest"; Transliteration: "Mori deichiban'erai dōbutsu" (Japanese: 森で一番えらい動物)	Keiichirō Mochizuki	Takeshi Shudo	May 17, 1978
85	"The Wizard of Oz - Part 3"; Transliteration: "Ozu no mahōtsukai dai 3-wa" (Japanese: オズの魔法使い 第3話)	Hiroshi Jinsenji; Kiyomu Fukuda	Akira Saiga	May 17, 1978
86	"The Pear Seller Hermit"; Transliteration: "Nashi uri sennin" (Japanese: なし売り仙人)	Ichirō Kimura	Chuzo Ichikawa	May 24, 1978
86	"The Wizard of Oz - Final Part"; Transliteration: "Ozu no mahōtsukai saishūkai" (Japanese: オズの魔法使い 最終回)	Kiyomu Fukuda	Akira Saiga	May 24, 1978
87	"Echo and Narcissus"; Transliteration: "Narushisu to Eko" (Japanese: ナルシスとエコー)	Kozo Masanobu	Chuzo Ichikawa	May 31, 1978
87	"The Prince and the Pauper - Part 1: The Switched Prince"; Transliteration: "Ōji to kojiki dai 1-wa irekawatta ōji" (Japanese: 王子とこじき 第1話 入れ替わった王子)	Hiroshi Jinsenji; Kiyomu Fukuda	Takeo Ohno	May 31, 1978
88	"The Mouse Wedding"; Transliteration: "Nezumi no yomeiri" (Japanese: ねずみの嫁入り)	Sadafumi Sano	Shina Matsuoka	June 7, 1978
88	"The Prince and the Pauper - Part 2: The Prince Expelled from the City"; Transliteration: "Ōji to kojiki dai 2-wa machi ni oidasa reta ōji" (Japanese: 王子とこじき 第2話 街に追い出された王子)	Takao Yotsuji; Kiyomu Fukuda	Takeo Ohno	June 7, 1978
89	"King Thrushbeard"; Transliteration: "Tsugumi no kuchibashi no ōji" (Japanese: つぐみのくちばしの王子)	Yukio Ebisawa	Chifude Asakura	June 14, 1978
89	"The Prince and the Pauper - Part 3: Danger, King Edward!"; Transliteration: "Ōji to kojiki dai 3-wa ayaushi! Edowādo-ō-gaku" (Japanese: 王子とこじき 第3話 危うし! エドワード王学)	Hiroshi Jinsenji; Kiyomu Fukuda	Takeo Ohno	June 14, 1978
90	"Summer Solstice Night Story"; Transliteration: "Geshi no yoru no hanashi" (Japanese: 夏至の夜の話)	Hideo Nishimaki; Hiroshi Oikawa	Shina Matsuoka	June 21, 1978
90	"The Prince and the Pauper - Part 4:Ah! Tears of Friendship"; Transliteration: "Ōji to kojiki dai 4-wa ā! Yūjō no namida" (Japanese: 王子とこじき 第4話 ああ! 友情の涙)	Takao Yotsuji; Masako Takeda	Takeo Ohno	June 21, 1978
91	"The Job Given by the Death"; Transliteration: "Shinigami nokureta shigoto" (Japanese: 死神のくれた仕事)	Mineo Fuji; Yoshio Kabashima	Chuzo Ichikawa	June 28, 1978
91	"The Prince and the Pauper - Final Part: On Whose Head Is the Shining Crown?"; Transliteration: "Ōji to kojiki saishūkai kagayaku ōkan dare no zujō ni" (Japanese: 王子とこじき 最終回 輝く王冠 誰の頭上に)	Hiroshi Jinsenji; Masako Takeda	Takeo Ohno	June 28, 1978
92	"The Fish Swimming in the Sky"; Transliteration: "Sora wooyogu sakana" (Japanese: 空をおよぐさかな)	Minoru Hashiba; Takao Yamazaki	Keiji Kubota	July 5, 1978
92	"Les Misérables - Part 1: The Silver Spoon"; Transliteration: "Aa mujō dai 1-wa gin no supūn" (Japanese: ああ無情 第1話 銀のスプーン)	Hiroshi Jinsenji; Tooru Yoshioka	Chifude Asakura	July 5, 1978
93	"The Stylish Peacock"; Transliteration: "Osharena kujaku" (Japanese: おしゃれなクジャク)	Etsuro Tokuda	Chikako Kuki	July 12, 1978
93	"Les Misérables - Part 2: Little Girl Cosette"; Transliteration: "Aa mujō dai 2-wa shōjo Kozetto" (Japanese: ああ無情 第2話 少女コゼット)	Hiroshi Jinsenji; Tooru Yoshioka	Chifude Asakura	July 12, 1978
94	"The Frog's Adventure"; Transliteration: "Kaeru no bōken" (Japanese: かえるの冒険)	Osamu Dezaki	Chuzo Ichikawa	July 19, 1978
94	"Les Misérables - Part 3: Farewell to Mother"; Transliteration: "Aa mujō dai 3-wa okāsan to no wakare" (Japanese: ああ無情 第3話 お母さんとの別れ)	Hiroshi Jinsenji; Takao Yotsuji	Chifude Asakura	July 19, 1978
95	"The Enchanted Organ"; Transliteration: "Fushigina orugan" (Japanese: ふしぎなオルガン)	Sadafumi Sano; Tadashi Shirakawa	Kimase Megumi	July 26, 1978
95	"Les Misérables - Part 4: Cosette's Happiness"; Transliteration: "Aa mujō dai 4-wa Kozetto no shiawase" (Japanese: ああ無情 第4話 コゼットのしあわせ)	Hiroshi Jinsenji; Kiyomu Fukuda	Chifude Asakura	July 26, 1978
96	"The Deer and the Turtle"; Transliteration: "Shika to umi game" (Japanese: シカと海がめ)	Hideo Nishimaki	Chizuko Ito	August 2, 1978
96	"Les Misérables - Part 5: Dreaming Cosette"; Transliteration: "Aa mujō dai 5-wa yumemiru Kozetto" (Japanese: ああ無情 第5話 夢見るコゼット)	Hiroshi Jinsenji; Kiyomu Fukuda	Chifude Asakura	August 2, 1978
97	"The Boy and the King of Sharks"; Transliteration: "Shōnen to same no ōsama" (Japanese: 少年とサメの王様)	Yukio Ebisawa	Masako Sugimoto	August 9, 1978
97	"Les Misérables - Part 6: Cosette's Dreams and Prayers"; Transliteration: "Aa mujō dai 6-wa Kozetto no yume to inori" (Japanese: ああ無情 第6話 コゼットの夢と祈り)	Hiroshi Jinsenji; Kiyomu Fukuda	Chifude Asakura	August 9, 1978
98	"Arachne Turned into Spider"; Transliteration: "Kumo ninatta Arakune" (Japanese: クモになったアラクネ)	Takao Yotsuji; Yoshiteru Kobayashi	Shina Matsuoka	August 16, 1978
98	"Les Misérables - Part 7: Cosette's Secret"; Transliteration: "Aa mujō dai 7-wa Kozetto no himitsu" (Japanese: ああ無情 第7話 コゼットの秘密)	Hiroshi Jinsenji; Kiyomu Fukuda	Chifude Asakura	August 16, 1978
99	"Star Cosmos"; Transliteration: "Hoshi no kosumosu" (Japanese: 星のコスモス)	Mineo Fuji; Masami Suda	Masaaki Sakurai	August 23, 1978
99	"Les Misérables - Part 8: Cosette's Christmas"; Transliteration: "Aa mujō dai 8-wa Kozetto no kurisumasu" (Japanese: ああ無情 第8話 コゼットのクリスマス)	Hiroshi Jinsenji; Kiyomu Fukuda	Chifude Asakura	August 23, 1978
100	"Secret Birthday"; Transliteration: "Tanjōbi no himitsu" (Japanese: 誕生日の秘密)	Hideo Nishimaki; Takao Yamazaki	Toshiro Ashizawa	August 30, 1978
100	"Les Misérables - Part 9: A Present for Cosette"; Transliteration: "Aa mujō dai 9-wa Kozetto e no purezento" (Japanese: ああ無情 第9話 コゼットへのプレゼント)	Hiroshi Jinsenji; Kiyomu Fukuda	Chifude Asakura	August 30, 1978
101	"Constellation: Swan Tears"; Transliteration: "Seiza hakuchō no namida" (Japanese: 星座・白鳥の涙)	Yuzo Aoki	Shina Matsuoka	September 6, 1978
101	"Les Misérables - Part 10: Cosette Full of Dreams"; Transliteration: "Aa mujō dai 10-wa yume-ippai no Kozetto" (Japanese: ああ無情 第10話 夢いっぱいのコゼット)	Hiroshi Jinsenji; Kiyomu Fukuda	Chifude Asakura	September 6, 1978
102	"The Magic Ring"; Transliteration: "Mahō no yubiwa" (Japanese: 魔法のゆびわ)	Minoru Hashiba	Masaaki Sakurai	September 13, 1978
102	"Les Misérables - Part 11: Cosette in Danger"; Transliteration: "Aa mujō dai 11-wa kiki ippatsu no Kozetto" (Japanese: ああ無情 第11話 危機一髪のコゼット)	Hiroshi Jinsenji; Kiyomu Fukuda	Chifude Asakura	September 13, 1978
103	"The Red-haired Naughty Chief"; Transliteration: "Akage no wanpaku shūchō" (Japanese: 赤毛のわんぱく酋長)	Keiichirō Mochizuki	Chifude Asakura	September 20, 1978
103	"Les Misérables - Part 12: Cosette is Alone"; Transliteration: "Aa mujō dai 12-wa hitoribocchi no Kozetto" (Japanese: ああ無情 第12話 ひとりぼっちのコゼット)	Hiroshi Jinsenji; Kiyomu Fukuda	Chifude Asakura	September 20, 1978
104	"The Man Who Lost His Shadow"; Transliteration: "Kage wonakushita otoko" (Japanese: 影をなくした男)	Kiyomu Fukuda	Kimase Megumi	September 27, 1978
104	"Les Misérables - Final Part: Farewell, Cosette"; Transliteration: "Aa mujō saishūkai Kozetto yo sayōnara" (Japanese: ああ無情 最終回 コゼットよさようなら)	Hiroshi Jinsenji; Kiyomu Fukuda	Chifude Asakura	September 27, 1978
105	"Little Red Riding Hood (rerun)" Transliteration: "Akazukin-chan (saihōsō)" (Japanese: 赤ずきんちゃん（再放送）)	Toshio Hirata	Takeo Ohno	October 11, 1978
105	"A Little Princess Sara - Part 1"; Transliteration: "Shōkōjo Sēra dai 1-wa" (Japanese: 小公女セーラ 第1話)	Hiroshi Jinsenji; Kiyomu Fukuda	Takeshi Shudo; Akira Saiga	October 11, 1978
106	"The Little Mermaid (rerun)" Transliteration: "Ningyo hime (saihōsō)" (Japanese: にんぎょ姫（再放送）)	Manabu Ōhashi; Yoshio Takeuchi	Chifude Asakura	October 18, 1978
106	"A Little Princess Sara - Part 2"; Transliteration: "Shōkōjo Sēra dai 2-wa" (Japanese: 小公女セーラ 第2話)	Takao Yotsuji; Kiyomu Fukuda	Takeshi Shudo; Akira Saiga	October 18, 1978
107	"The Wolf and the Seven Young Goats (rerun)" Transliteration: "Ōkami to nana hiki no ko yagi (saihōsō)" (Japanese: おおかみと七ひきの子やぎ（再放送）)	Masami Hata	Chifude Asakura	October 25, 1978
107	"A Little Princess Sara - Part 3"; Transliteration: "Shōkōjo Sēra dai 3-wa" (Japanese: 小公女セーラ 第3話)	Hiroshi Jinsenji; Kiyomu Fukuda	Takeshi Shudo; Akira Saiga	October 25, 1978
108	"Hansel and Gretel (rerun)" Transliteration: "Henzeru to Gureteru (saihōsō)" (Japanese: ヘンゼルとグレーテル（再放送）)	Yû Tachibana	Keiji Kubota	November 1, 1978
108	"A Little Princess Sara - Part 4"; Transliteration: "Shōkōjo Sēra dai 4-wa" (Japanese: 小公女セーラ 第4話)	Takao Yotsuji; Kiyomu Fukuda	Takeshi Shudo; Akira Saiga	November 1, 1978
109	"The Happy Prince (rerun)" Transliteration: "Kōfuku no ōji (saihōsō)" (Japanese: 幸福の王子（再放送）)	Hideo Takayashiki	Hikaru Takaoka	November 8, 1978
109	"A Little Princess Sara - Part 5"; Transliteration: "Shōkōjo Sēra dai 5-wa" (Japanese: 小公女セーラ 第5話)	Hiroshi Jinsenji; Kiyomu Fukuda	Takeshi Shudo; Akira Saiga	November 8, 1978
110	"The Pheasant and the Gong (rerun)" Transliteration: "Kane wo narashi ta kiji (saihōsō)" (Japanese: 鐘をならしたきじ（再放送）)	Toshio Hirata	Keiji Kubota	November 15, 1978
110	"A Little Princess Sara - Part 6"; Transliteration: "Shōkōjo Sēra dai 6-wa" (Japanese: 小公女セーラ 第6話)	Takao Yotsuji; Kiyomu Fukuda	Takeshi Shudo; Akira Saiga	November 15, 1978
111	"The Nightingale and the Rose (rerun)" Transliteration: "Naichingeru to bara (saihōsō)" (Japanese: ナイチンゲールとばら（再放送）)	Yoshio Takeuchi	Hiroshi Ishii	November 29, 1978
111	"A Little Princess Sara - Part 7"; Transliteration: "Shōkōjo Sēra dai 7-wa" (Japanese: 小公女セーラ 第7話)	Hiroshi Jinsenji; Kiyomu Fukuda	Takeshi Shudo; Akira Saiga	November 29, 1978
112	"The Snake and the Talkative Wife"; Transliteration: "Hebi to oshaberi kamisan" (Japanese: ヘビとおしゃべりかみさん)	Katsumi Endo	Chifude Asakura	December 6, 1978
112	"A Little Princess Sara - Part 8"; Transliteration: "Shōkōjo Sēra dai 8-wa" (Japanese: 小公女セーラ 第8話)	Takao Yotsuji; Kiyomu Fukuda	Takeshi Shudo; Akira Saiga	December 6, 1978
113	"Ma Liang and the Magic Brush"; Transliteration: "Mā Ryan to mahō no fude" (Japanese: マーリャンと魔法の筆)	Mineo Fuji	Hiroyuki Igarashi	December 13, 1978
113	"A Little Princess Sara - Part 9"; Transliteration: "Shōkōjo Sēra dai 9-wa" (Japanese: 小公女セーラ 第9話)	Hiroshi Jinsenji; Kiyomu Fukuda	Takeshi Shudo; Akira Saiga	December 13, 1978
114	"Christmas Gift"; Transliteration: "Kurisumasu no okuri mono" (Japanese: クリスマスの贈りもの)	Yukio Ebisawa	Chifude Asakura	December 20, 1978
114	"A Little Princess Sara - Part 10"; Transliteration: "Shōkōjo Sēra dai 10-wa" (Japanese: 小公女セーラ 第10話)	Takao Yotsuji; Kiyomu Fukuda	Takeshi Shudo; Akira Saiga	December 20, 1978
115	"The Little Match Girl (rerun)" Transliteration: "Macchi uri no shōjo (saihōsō)" (Japanese: マッチうりの少女（再放送）)	Moribi Murano	Chifude Asakura	December 27, 1978
115	"A Little Princess Sara - Final Part"; Transliteration: "Shōkōjo Sēra saishūkai" (Japanese: 小公女セーラ 最終回)	Hiroshi Jinsenji; Kiyomu Fukuda	Takeshi Shudo; Akira Saiga	December 27, 1978
116	"The Wolf and the Old Dog Sultan"; Transliteration: "Ōkami to rōken Zurutan" (Japanese: おおかみと老犬ズルタン)	Yoichi Fukuhara	Shigeru Sato	January 10, 1979
116	"Cuore: School of Love - Part 1"; Transliteration: "Kuore ai no gakkō dai 1-wa" (Japanese: クオレ 愛の学校 第1話)	Takao Yotsuji; Kiyomu Fukuda	Fumio Ishimori; Shina Matsuoka	January 10, 1979
117	"The King and the 100 Rabbits"; Transliteration: "Ōsama to 100 hiki nōsagi" (Japanese: 王さまと100匹のうさぎ)	Keiichirō Mochizuki	Chifude Asakura	January 17, 1979
117	"Cuore: School of Love - Part 2"; Transliteration: "Kuore ai no gakkō dai 2-wa" (Japanese: クオレ 愛の学校 第2話)	Hiroshi Jinsenji; Kiyomu Fukuda	Fumio Ishimori; Shina Matsuoka	January 17, 1979
118	"Indian Cinderella"; Transliteration: "Indeian no Shinderera hime" (Japanese: インディアンのシンデレラ姫)	Hiroshi Jinsenji; Masashi Kato	Hiroyuki Igarashi	January 24, 1979
118	"Cuore: School of Love - Part 3"; Transliteration: "Kuore ai no gakkō dai 3-wa" (Japanese: クオレ 愛の学校 第3話)	Takao Yotsuji; Kiyomu Fukuda	Fumio Ishimori; Shina Matsuoka	January 24, 1979
119	"Peter the Giant Slayer"; Transliteration: "Kyojin taiji no peteru" (Japanese: 巨人退治のペテル)	Yoichi Fukuhara	Chikako Kuki	January 31, 1979
119	"Cuore: School of Love - Final Part"; Transliteration: "Kuore ai no gakkō saishūkai" (Japanese: クオレ 愛の学校 最終回)	Hiroshi Jinsenji; Kiyomu Fukuda	Fumio Ishimori; Shina Matsuoka	January 31, 1979
120	"Even Lupin Would Be Surprised! The Master Thief"; Transliteration: "Rupan mobikkuri! Dorobōno meijin" (Japanese: ルパンもびっくり!どろぼうの名人)	Yoshiyuki Momose	Chifude Asakura	February 7, 1979
120	"Sindbad the Adventurer - Part 1"; Transliteration: "Bōken Shindobaddo dai 1-wa" (Japanese: 冒険シンドバッド 第1話)	Takao Yotsuji; Kiyomu Fukuda	Shigeru Sato	February 7, 1979
121	"A Game of Intelligence! The King and the Maiden"; Transliteration: "Chie kurabe! Ōsama to musume" (Japanese: ちえくらべ!王さまと娘)	Kiyomu Fukuda	Masaaki Sakurai	February 14, 1979
121	"Sindbad the Adventurer - Part 2"; Transliteration: "Bōken Shindobaddo dai 2-wa" (Japanese: 冒険シンドバッド 第2話)	Hiroshi Jinsenji; Kiyomu Fukuda	Shigeru Sato	February 14, 1979
122	"The Frog Prince"; Transliteration: "Kaeru no ōjisama" (Japanese: 蛙の王子さま)	Mineo Fuji	Chifude Asakura	February 21, 1979
122	"Sindbad the Adventurer - Part 3"; Transliteration: "Bōken Shindobaddo dai 3-wa" (Japanese: 冒険シンドバッド 第3話)	Takao Yotsuji; Kiyomu Fukuda	Shigeru Sato	February 21, 1979
123	"Defeating Ghosts Before Snacks"; Transliteration: "Oyatsuno mae niobake taiji" (Japanese: おやつの前におばけ退治)	Noboru Kominato	Shigeru Sato	February 28, 1979
123	"Sindbad the Adventurer - Final Part"; Transliteration: "Bōken Shindobaddo saishūkai" (Japanese: 冒険シンドバッド 最終回)	Hiroshi Jinsenji; Kiyomu Fukuda	Shigeru Sato	February 28, 1979
124	"The Little Havelman"; Transliteration: "Chīsana Hēberuman" (Japanese: 小さなヘーベルマン)	Akio Sakai	Masaaki Sakurai	March 7, 1979
124	"The Adventures of Pinocchio - Part 1"; Transliteration: "Pinokio no bōken dai 1-wa" (Japanese: ピノキオの冒険 第1話)	Hiroshi Jinsenji; Nobuyuki Kitajima	Motoko Misawa	March 7, 1979
125	"Ciccillo's Wish"; Transliteration: "Chichiro no negai" (Japanese: チチロの願い)	Akio Hosoya	Chifude Asakura	March 14, 1979
125	"The Adventures of Pinocchio - Part 2"; Transliteration: "Pinokio no bōken dai 2-wa" (Japanese: ピノキオの冒険 第2話)	Takao Yotsuji; Nobuyuki Kitajima	Motoko Misawa	March 14, 1979
126	"The Swineherd Prince"; Transliteration: "Buta kai ōji" (Japanese: ぶた飼い王子)	Aso Dai	Shōzō Matsuda	March 21, 1979
126	"The Adventures of Pinocchio - Part 3"; Transliteration: "Pinokio no bōken dai 3-wa" (Japanese: ピノキオの冒険 第3話)	Takao Yotsuji; Nobuyuki Kitajima	Motoko Misawa	March 21, 1979
127	"Marushka's Salt"; Transliteration: "Marūshika no shio" (Japanese: マルーシカの塩)	Yoshishige Kosako	Chifude Asakura	March 28, 1979
127	"The Adventures of Pinocchio - Final Part"; Transliteration: "Pinokio no bōken saishūkai" (Japanese: ピノキオの冒険 最終回)	Hiroshi Jinsenji; Nobuyuki Kitajima	Motoko Misawa	March 28, 1979
