= Manga Fairy Tales of the World =

Japanese anime anthology series

- A scene from the second opening titles with the sad female character

まんが世界昔ばなし (Manga sekai mukashi banashi)
- Genre: Adventure, fantasy, drama, romance, thriller, biopic
- Anime television series
- Directed by: Masami Kuzū; Osamu Dezaki; Yoshihiko Soga; Keinosuke Tsuchiya; Sadao Nozaki; Tan Hakata; Hideo Nishimaki; Tadakata Ishida
- Produced by: Hiroshi Inoue (TBS); Yasuo Ooda; Yuji Tanno
- Music by: Harumi Ibe
- Studio: World Television; TBS Britannica; Dax International; Madhouse (eps. 1-52)
- Original network: TBS
- Original run: October 7, 1976 – March 28, 1979
- Episodes: 127 (232 segments)

Manga Fairy Tales of the World (Japanese: まんが世界昔ばなし, Hepburn: Manga sekai mukashi banashi; lit. 'Manga World Folk Tales'), also known as Tales of Magic, Merlin's Cave and Wonderful Tales From Around the World, is a Japanese anime anthology series produced by World Television, TBS Britannica and Dax International. The series features adaptations of fairy tales, legends, literature classics and famous characters biographies.

== Premise ==
The show consists of 127 episodes, each one combining two different stories, which run for 10 minutes each, except for 13 mid-series stories that covered an entire half-hour episode. Some story arcs in the second half of the series are told over several episodes, as in the case of A Little Princess lasting 11 episodes, and Les Misérables, which lasted 13 episodes for a total running time of 120 minutes, but these serial episodes were broadcast alternating with shorter stories, sometimes reruns of earlier episodes in the series. The series features 181 story arcs, consisting of 232 segments in total excluding reruns.

== Cast ==
- Mariko Miyagi: Narrator, Miscellaneous
- Akira Nagoya: Miscellaneous

=== English voices ===
Tales of Magic

- Nicole Richards: Narrator
- Andrew Brennan
- Bruce Malmuth
- Carolyn Stone
- Dwayne Pawloff
- Gia McCaffrey
- Jean Rodgers
- Marylyn Conley
- Sonny Ross
- Steve Watson
- Susie Romero

Wonderful Tales From Around the World

- Telly Savalas: Narrator (in "Sinbad the Sailor")
- Chuck Howerton
- Linda Gary
- Tony Pope
- Corey Burton
- Dan Sturkie
- Hal Smith

== Production ==
The series was animated by Dax international in cooperation with Madhouse for the first 52 episodes. Every tale is produced by a different staff who gave each episode their own distinctive style. Among the many artists who worked on the series there are: Osamu Dezaki (under the pseudonym of Kan Matsudo), Akio Sugino, Yoshifumi Kondō, Yoshiaki Kawajiri, Toyoo Ashida and Shuichi Seki. The narration is provided by Mariko Miyagi, who also voices all the characters in the series along with Akira Nagoya.

== Release ==
English title card of show

Japanese title card from the second opening

The show aired in Japan on TBS from October 7, 1976, to March 28, 1979. The entire series has been distributed on home video by TDK since 1987, first on VHS and later on DVD. A new edition restored in HD was distributed by Broadway in 12 DVD boxes from August 5, 2015, to April 5, 2017. This latest version was added in Japan on Amazon Prime Video, in two seasons of 200 and 45 12-minute episodes respectively, and on Apple TV.

The show has been released in English-speaking countries by different companies under various titles. In 1979 American Way released a selection of 65 episodes in three seasons with the title Tales of Magic. Some episodes already featured in Tales of Magic, as in the case of Alice's Adventures in Wonderland or The Snow Queen were adapted by Fred Laderman and broadcast by BFA Educational Media on CBS as single half-hour specials. In 1986 Embassy Home Entertainment released on VHS selected episodes of Tales of Magic, sometimes under the alternative title Merlin's Cave (Merlin's Magic Cave on the videotape cover).

Another English adaptation of the series titled Wonderful Tales From Around the World was produced in the 1980s by Cori Films Int'l and distributed by Orient Film Associates.

The series was also released in several other countries such as Italy, France, Spain, Portugal, Germany, Sweden, Norway, Quebec, Brazil, South Korea and in the Middle East.

=== International titles ===
- As Mais Belas Histórias do Mundo (Portuguese)
- Castillo de Cuentos (Spanish)
- Cuentos Populares (Spanish)
- Cuentos Universales (Spanish)
- Fiabe... così (Italian)
- Fiabe dal mondo (Italian)
- Le più belle favole del mondo (Italian)
- Racconti dal mondo (Italian)
- Super Aventuras (Portuguese)
- حكايات عالمية (Arabic)
- まんが世界昔ばなし (Japanese)
- アニメ世界の昔ばなし (Japanese)
- 금나라 은나라 (Korean)

== Stories ==
Popular fairytales and fables adapted in the series include:

- Snow White
- Cinderella
- Beauty and the Beast
- The Little Mermaid
- The Wolf and the Seven Young Goats
- The Emperor's New Clothes
- Jack and the Beanstalk
- The Ugly Duckling
- The Three Little Pigs
- Little Red Riding Hood
- The Golden Goose
- The Little Match Girl
- The Twelve Months
- Puss in Boots
- The Wild Swans
- The Snow Queen
- Sleeping Beauty
- Thumbelina
- The Town Mouse and the Country Mouse
- Why the Sea is Salt
- The Ant and the Grasshopper
- Hansel and Gretel
- Town Musicians of Bremen
- Bluebeard
- The Spirit in the Bottle
- Ivan the Fool
- The Tinderbox
- The Red Shoes
- The Goose Girl
- Aladdin and the Magic Lamp
- The Straw, the Coal, and the Bean
- The Little Humpbacked Horse

Legendary tales in the series include The Pied Piper of Hamelin, William Tell, Medusa's Head, The King with Donkey Ears, Robin Hood, Rostam and Sohrab, The Last Leaf, The Flying Dutchman, Knight of the Swan, and Faust.

Novels adapted in the show include Uncle Tom's Cabin, Don Quixote, The Happy Prince, Alice in Wonderland, Monkey King, The Adventures of Tom Sawyer, The Prince and the Pauper, A Dog of Flanders, Little Women, Treasure Island, Gulliver's Travels, Les Misérables, A Little Princess and The Adventures of Pinocchio and Peter Pan.

In addition to fairytales and fables, the show also features biographical episodes about scientist Galileo Galilei and social reformer Florence Nightingale, adaptations of William Shakespeare's tragedies King Lear and Romeo and Juliet, gothic horrors Dracula and Frankenstein, religious stories about Joan of Arc and Noah's Ark, and as well as epic poems such as Iliad.

=== Countries and sources ===
Each episode title includes a note about the country of origin of the story or the author of the work it is based on:

- "The Wolf and the Seven Young Goats" from Grimm's fairytale (Germany)
- "Beauty and the Beast" (France)
- "The Little Mermaid" original story by Andersen (Denmark)
- "The Cunning Rabbit" (America)
- "The Emperor's New Clothes" original story by Andersen (Denmark)
- "Two Greedy Bears" from a Hungarian folktale (Hungary)
- "Jack and the Beanstalk" from a British folktale (England)
- "The Pheasant and the Gong" from a Korean folktale (South Korea)
- "The Ridiculous Wishes" from a British folktale (England)
- "The Ugly Duckling" original story by Andersen (Denmark)
- "The Pied Piper of Hamelin" from a Prussian legend (Germany)
- "William Tell" original story by Friedrich Schiller (Switzerland)
- "Little Red Riding Hood" from Perrault's fairytale (France)
- "The Smart Coyote" from an American folktale (America)
- "Don Quixote" original story by Cervantes (Spain)
- "The Happy Prince" original story by Oscar Wilde (England)
- "The King with Donkey Ears" from a Yugoslav folktale (Yugoslavia)
- "Why the Sea is Salt" from a Norwegian folktale (Norway)
- "Bluebeard" from Perrault's fairytale (France)
- "A Dog of Flanders" original story by Ouida (Belgium)
- "The Golden Goose" from Grimm's fairytale (Germany)
- "Medusa's Head" from Greek mythology (Greece)
- "The Wild Swans" from a Danish folktale (Denmark)
- "The Little Match Girl" original story by Andersen (Denmark)
- "The Twelve Months" from a Czech folktale (Czechoslovakia)
- "Puss in Boots" from Perrault's fairytale (France)
- "How the Coyote Stole Fire" from a Native American legend (America)
- "The Selfish Giant" original story by Oscar Wilde (England)
- "The Flying Dutchman" from a Dutch folktale (Holland)
- "Hansel and Gretel" from Grimm's fairytale (Germany)
- "The Curious Tiger" from a Chinese folktale (China)
- "Town Musicians of Bremen" from Grimm's fairytale (Germany)
- "Rostam and Sohrab" from the Persian Book of Kings (Iran)
- "Sleeping Beauty" from Grimm's fairytale (Germany)
- "The Story of How Clothes Ate Rice" from a Turkish folktale (Turkey)
- "The Town Mouse and the Country Mouse" from Aesop's fable (Greece)
- "The Rainbow Bird" from a Native American legend (South America)
- "Noah's Ark" from the Old Testament (Israel)
- "The Donkey Inn" from a Chinese folktale (China)
- "Ali Baba and the Forty Thieves" from the Arabian Nights (Iraq)
- "The Nightingale and the Rose" original story by Oscar Wilde (England)
- "Joan of Arc" from the history of France (France)
- "The Little Buddha's Red Eyes" from a North Korean legend (North Korea)
- "Thumbelina" original story by Andersen (Denmark)
- "The Heart of a Monkey" from a Thai folktale (Thailand)
- From the Cuore story "The Shipwreck" original story by Amicis (Italy)
- "Why Cats Wash Their Faces After Eating" from a Lithuanian folktale (Soviet Union)
- "The Last Leaf" original story by O. Henry (America)
- "The Woman and the Polar Bear" from an Eskimo folktale
- "Trojan Horse" from Greek mythology (Greece)
- "The Magic Shooter" original story by F. Kind (Germany)
- "The Tablecloth Given by the North Wind" from a Norwegian folktale (Norway)
- "The Rainbow Lake" from an Italian folktale (Italy)
- "Cinderella" from Perrault's fairytale (France)
- "The Rabbit and the Tiger" from a Korean folktale (South Korea)
- "The Shepherd and the Lion" from a Roman fable (Italy)
- "The Peasant Doctor" from a French folktale (France)
- "The Boy Who Cried Wolf" from Aesop's fable (Greece)
- "The Spirit in the Bottle" from Grimm's fairytale (Germany)
- "The Red Shoes" original story by Andersen (Denmark)
- "The Bats, the Birds and the Beasts" from Aesop's fable (Greece)
- "The Big Dipper" original story by Tolstoy (Soviet Union)
- "Seal Skin" from an Iceland folktale (Iceland)
- "The Steadfast Tin Soldier" original story by Andersen (Denmark)
- "Why the Turtle is Slow" from an African folktale (Cameroon)
- "The Tinderbox and the Soldier" original story by Andersen (Denmark)
- "The Goose Girl" from Grimm's fairytale (Germany)
- "Gulliver's Travels" original story by Swift (England)
- "The Lyre of Orpheus" from Greek mythology (Greece)
- "A Fox and a Rabbit Compete in Intelligence" from a Native American folktale (America)
- "Faust" original story by Goethe (Germany)
- "Aladdin and the Magic Lamp" from the Arabian Nights (Iraq)
- "Why Cats and Dogs Fight" from a Chinese folktale (China)
- "The Little Humpbacked Horse" original story by Yershov (Soviet Union)
- "The Story of a Mother" original story by Andersen (Denmark)
- "Snow White" from Grimm's fairytale (Germany)
- "The Straw, the Coal, and the Bean" from Grimm's fairytale (Germany)
- "Tanabata" from a Chinese folktale (China)
- "Galileo Galilei" from the world history (Italy)
- "The Three Little Pigs" from a British folktale (England)
- "Ivan the Fool" original story by Tolstoy (Soviet Union)
- "Dracula" from a Transylvanian legend (Romania)
- "The Horse of Fire" original story by E. A. Poe (Hungary)
- "The Old Man Who Changed His Work" from a Norwegian folktale (Norway)
- "Knight of the Swan" from a German legend (Germany)
- "White Forehead" original story by Chekhov (Soviet Union)
- "Emily's Red Gloves" from a British folktale (England)
- "Fox's Judgment" original story by Goethe (Germany)
- "Frankenstein" original story by Mary Shelley (England)
- "The Golden Deer" from an Indian folktale (India)
- "Rabbit With a Cold" from a Burmese folktale (Burma)
- "The Adventures of Robin Hood" original story by Pyle (England)
- "Magical Leaves" an African folktale (Congo)
- "Dying Friendship" from a Roman fable (Italy)
- "Water Spirit and the Boy" from a Swedish folktale (Sweden)
- "Monkey King" original story by Wu Cheng'en (China)
- "Why Crows Wrinkle Cuckoo Eggs" from a Burmese folktale (Burma)
- "The Ant and the Grasshopper" from Aesop's fable (Greece)
- "King Lear" original story by Shakespeare (England)
- "Luminous Ball" from a Chinese folktale (China)
- "Little Women" original story by Alcott (America)
- "Carrot Top" original story by Renard (France)
- "Nobody's Boy" original story by Malot (France)
- "Nightingale Story" from the world history (England)
- "Treasure Island" original story by Stevenson (England)
- "Cosette" (from Les Misérables) original story by Hugo (France)
- "Carmen" original story by Mérimée (Spain)
- "Swan Lake" (from a German folktale) (Germany)
- "Romeo and Juliet" Shakespeare (England)
- "Alice in Wonderland" original story by Lewis Carroll (England)
- "Uncle Tom's Cabin" (Eliza edition) original story by Mrs Stowe (America)
- "The Nutcracker" original story by Hoffmann (Germany)
- "The Snow Queen" original story by Andersen (Denmark)
- "The Snow-Image Song" original story by Hawthorne (America)
- "The Family of Love" original story: Sapper (Germany)
- "The Migratory Fish" from an African folktale (Africa)
- "The Monkey King and the Mangoes" from the Jataka tales (India)
- "Old Man of the Mountain" from a Miao folktale (China)
- "Harui and the Toad" from a Korean folktale (South Korea)
- "The Adventures of Tom Sawyer" original story by Mark Twain (America)
- "The Mysterious Kokyu" from a Vietnamese folktale
- "Dick and the Cat" from an English folktale (England)
- "The Kind Shepherd" from a Serbian folktale (Yugoslavia)
- "The Story of the Rabbit Who Gets the Butter" from a Native American folktale (America)
- "Two Years' Vacation" original story by Verne (France)
- "The Officer" from a Mongolian folktale (Mongolian People's Republic)
- "The Smith on the Cloud" original story by Topelius (Finland)
- "Frost Giant" original story by Topelius (Finland)
- "Viola Tricolor" original story by Storm (Germany)
- "Suho's White Horse" from a Mongolian folktale (Mongolia)
- "Daddy-Long-Legs" original story by Webster (America)
- "Barry, Dog of the Alps" from a Swiss legend (Switzerland)
- "Little Claus and Big Claus" original story by Andersen (Denmark)
- "The Caliph Stork" original story by Hauff (Germany)
- "The Nightingale and the Emperor" original story by Andersen (Denmark)
- "The Wizard of Oz" original story by Baum (America)
- "When a Frog Croaks, It Rains" from a Vietnamese folktale (Vietnam)
- "The Greatest Animal in the Forest" Indian folktale (India)
- "The Pear Seller Hermit" from a Chinese folktale (China)
- "Echo and Narcissus" from Greek mythology (Greece)
- "The Prince and the Pauper" original story by Mark Twain (America)
- "The Mouse Wedding" from an Indian folktale (India)
- "King Thrushbeard" from Grimm's fairytale (Germany)
- "Summer Solstice Night Story" original story by Topelius (Finland)
- "The Job Given by the Death" from Grimm's fairytale (Germany)
- "The Fish Swimming in the Sky" original story by Lang (England)
- "Les Misérables" original story by Victor Hugo (France)
- "The Stylish Peacock" from Aesop's fable (Greece)
- "The Frog's Adventure" from Andersen's fairytale (Denmark)
- "The Enchanted Organ" original story by Leander (Germany)
- "The Deer and the Turtle" from a Cuban folktale (Cuba)
- "The Boy and the King of Sharks" from a Hawaiian folktale (America-Hawaii)
- "Arachne Turned into Spider" from Greek mythology (Greece)
- "Star Cosmos" from Grimm's fairytale (Germany)
- "Secret Birthday" original story by Sapper (Germany)
- "Constellation: Swan Tears" from Greek mythology (Greece)
- "The Magic Ring" original story by Leander (Germany)
- "The Red-haired Naughty Chief" original story by O. Henry (America)
- "The Man Who Lost His Shadow" from a Korean folktale (South Korea)
- "A Little Princess Sara" from A Little Princess by Burnett (America)
- "The Snake and the Talkative Wife" from an Iranian folktale (Iran)
- "Ma Liang and the Magic Brush" from a Chinese folktale (China)
- "Christmas Gift" original story by O. Henry (America)
- "The Wolf and the Old Dog Sultan" from Grimm's fairytale (Germany)
- "Cuore: School of Love" from Cuore by Amicis (Italy)
- "The King and the 100 Rabbits" from a German folktale (Germany)
- "Indian Cinderella" from an American folktale (America)
- "Peter the Giant Slayer" from Grimm's fairytale (Germany)
- "Even Lupin Would Be Surprised! The Master Thief" original story by Hebel (Germany)
- "Sindbad the Adventurer" from the Arabian Nights
- "A Game of Intelligence! The King and the Maiden" from Grimm's fairytale (Germany)
- "The Frog Prince" from Grimm's fairytale (Germany)
- "Defeating Ghosts Before Snacks" from Grimm's fairytale (Germany)
- "The Little Havelman" original story by Storm (Germany)
- "The Adventures of Pinocchio" original story by Collodi (Italy)
- "Ciccillo's Wish" original story by Amicis (Italy)
- "The Swineherd Prince" original story by Andersen (Denmark)
- "Marushka's Salt" from a Czech folktale (Czechoslovakia)

== Music ==
All songs were performed by Mariko Miyagi.

Opening theme:

No.	Title	Lyrics	Music	Length
1.	"Uba Uba Ukyakya" ((ウバ・ウバ・ウキャキャ))	Mariko Miyagi	Koichi Morita	2:52
2.	"Watashi O Yobu No Wa Dare" ((私を呼ぶのは誰) (English: Who Is Calling Me?)	Mieko Arima	Koichi Sugiyama	2:50
3.	"Mama! Himitsu Dayo" ((ママ!ひみつだよ))	Mariko Miyagi	Koichi Morita	2:13

Ending theme:

No.	Title	Lyrics	Music	Length
1.	"Yume O Mita No" ((夢をみたの))	Mariko Miyagi	Koichi Morita	2:50
2.	"Memoir" ((めもわーる))	Mieko Arima	Koichi Sugiyama	3:24
3.	"Tenshi Ga Toru" ((天使がとおる))	Mariko Miyagi	Koichi Morita	2:40

In the original broadcast, "Uba Uba Ukyakya" and "Yume O Mita No" were used for the first 52 episodes, "Watashi O Yobu No Wa Dare" and "Memoir" for episodes 53 to 104, and "Mama! Himitsu Dayo" and "Tenshi Ga Toru" for the remainder of the series.

The current edition of the series uses "Uba Uba Ukyakya" for the first 79 episodes, "Watashi O Yobu No Wa Dare" for episodes 80 to 123 and "Mama! Himitsu Dayo" for the last four episodes of the series. None of the original ending themes were retained, a short instrumental piece was used instead.

In the English version, the Japanese opening theme song "Watashi O Yobu No Wa Dare" is titled Tales of Magic. Written by Kenny Ellis, it is sung in English with only a slight melodic change.
