= Tony Schumacher (German author) =

German author

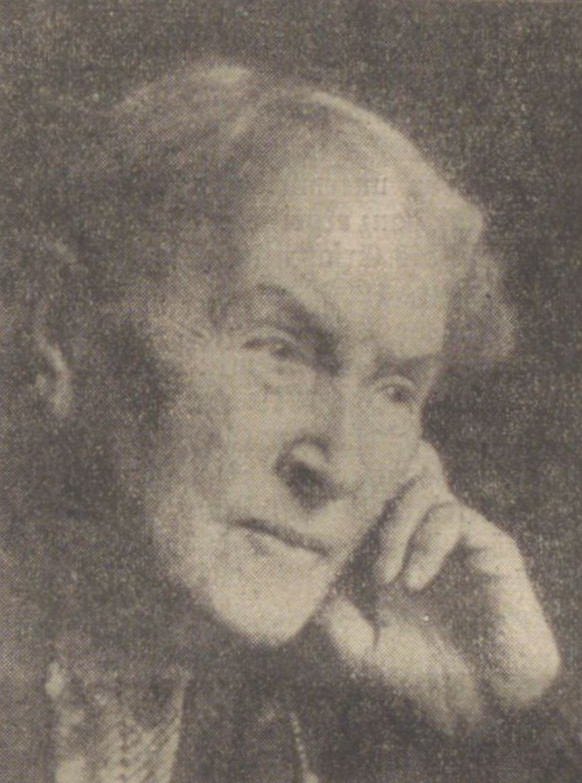
Portrait photo of Tony Schumacher

Tony Schumacher (17 May 1848 in Ludwigsburg – 10 July 1931 in Ludwigsburg; born Antonie Louise Christiane Marie Sophie von Baur-Breitenfeld) was a German author. Together with Thekla von Gumpert, Isabella Braun, Ottilie Wildermuth, Johanna Spyri, Agnes Sapper and others she belongs to the most well known German children books authors of the 19th and early 20th century.

== Works (selection) ==
There are about 60 books, of which 8 are autobiographical, 60 prose and verse novelletas and about 260 pencil drawings by Tony Schumacher:

- "Mütterchens Hilfstruppen" (1895)
- "Eine glückliche Familie" (1896)
- "Du und deine Hausgenossen" (1897)
- "Schulleben" (1897)
- "Alltagssorgen und Alltagsfreuden" (1898)
- "Reserl am Hofe" (1898)
- "Keine Langeweile" (1899)
- "Vom Schulmädel bis zur Großmutter" (1900)
- "Das Turmengele" (1901)
- "Was ich als Kind erlebt" (1901)
- "Ein Wunderkind" (1903)
- "Heimatzauber" (1904)
- "Überall Sonnenschein" (1905)
- "Dummerchen" (1906)
- "Cirkuskinder" (1907)
- "Und doch glücklich" (1908)
- "Rigikinder und andre Geschichten" (1909)
- "Ein fester Wille" (1910)
- "Marietta" (1911)
- "Theaterkinder" (1912)
- "Hanneles Opfer" (1913)
- "Komteßchen und Zigeunerkind" (1914)
- "Wenn Vater im Krieg ist" (1915) ( == Als Vater im Krieg war ca.1930)
- "Vater noch im Kriege" (1916)
- "Mein liebes Märchenbuch" (1916)
- "Die Waldmargret" (1917)
- "Miriams Treue" (1918)
- "Die beiden Trotzköpfe" (1919)
- "Ein Kind aus Indien" (1920)
- "Um der Mutter willen" (1921)
- "Ferienkinder in den Bergen" (1923)
- "Mein Kindheitsparadies" (1924)
- "Das Schloß-Bärbele" (1925)
- "Was mein einst war" (1925)
- "Heimat um Heimat" (1926)
- "Heut - Beste Zeit !" (1927)
- "Das Findelkind" (1928)
- "Li und Lu" (1929)
- "Nellys Kinder" (1930)
- "Ein Schwarzwaldkind" (1931)
- "Was meine alten Möbel mir erzählen" (1928)
- "Wie ich zu meiner Puppensammlung kam" (1929)

== Literature (selection) ==
- Manfred Berger: Tony Schumacher. In: Kinder- und Jugendliteratur. Ein Lexikon. 7. Erg.-Lfg. Februar 1999, Corian Verlag Meitingen
- Anne Rooschüz: Tony Schumacher. Ein Lebensbild. Stuttgart 1931
- Rolf und Heide Augustin: Gelebt in Traum und Wirklichkeit. Biographie und Bibliographie der einst berühmten Ludwigsburger Kinderbuchautorin Tony Schumacher - eine Recherche. Frankfurt/Main 2002
- Rolf und Heide Augustin: Aus Tony Schumachers Leben. Geschichten und Begegnungen. Ludwigsburg 2006
- Friedrich Pfäfflin: Levy & Müller: Verlag der „Herold-Bücher“ Stuttgart; 1871, 1895, 1933, 1936, 1949, 1951; Verlagsgeschichte, Bibliographie, Autoren. Stuttgart: Verband Deutscher Antiquare, 2010. ISBN 978-3-98-12223-4-0
