= Fairy Tales Told for Children. First Collection. =

1830s collection by Hans Christian Andersen

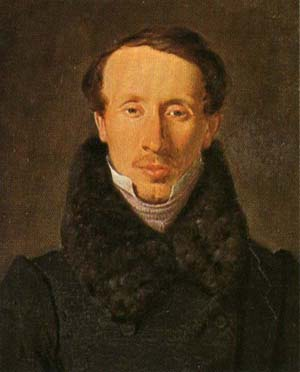
- Author: Hans Christian Andersen
- Original title: Eventyr, fortalte for Børn. Første Samling.
- Language: Danish
- Genre: Literary fairy tale
- Publisher: C. A. Reitzel
- Publication date: 8 May 1835 – 7 April 1837
- Publication place: Denmark
- Media type: Fairy tale collection

Fairy Tales Told for Children. First Collection. (Danish: Eventyr, fortalte for Børn. Første Samling.) is a collection of nine fairy tales by Hans Christian Andersen. The tales were published in a series of three installments by C. A. Reitzel between May 1835 and April 1837, and represent Andersen's first venture into the fairy tale genre.

The nine tales of the three booklets were collected together and published in one volume and sold at seventy-two shillings. A title page, a table of contents, and a preface by Andersen were published in the volume.

The stories included were "The Tinderbox" (first booklet), "Little Claus and Big Claus" (first booklet), "The Princess on the Pea" (first booklet), "Little Ida's Flowers" (first booklet), "Thumbelina" (second booklet), "The Naughty Boy" (second booklet), "The Traveling Companion" (second booklet), "The Little Mermaid" (third booklet), and "The Emperor's New Clothes" (third booklet).
