= The Fisherman and the Jinni =

Story from the One Thousand and One Nights

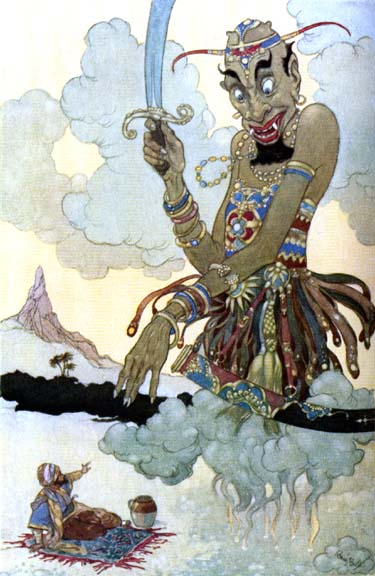
1898 illustration of The Fisherman and the Jinni by René Bull

"The Fisherman and the Jinni" is the second top-level story told by Sheherazade in the One Thousand and One Nights.

== Synopsis ==
There is an old, poor fisherman who casts his net exactly four times a day. One day he goes to the shore and casts his net. First he catches a dead donkey, then a pitcher full of dirt, then shards of pottery and glass. On his fourth and final try, he calls upon the name of God and casts his net. When he pulls it up he finds a copper jar with a cap that had the seal of Solomon on it. The fisherman is overjoyed, since he could sell the jar for money. He is curious of what is inside the jar, and removes the cap with his knife. A plume of smoke comes out of the jar and condenses into an Ifrit (a more powerful, malevolent jinni). The fisherman is frightened, although initially the jinni does not notice him. The jinni thinks that Solomon has come to kill him. When the fisherman tells him that Solomon had been dead for eighteen centuries, the Jinni is overjoyed and grants the fisherman a choice of the manner of his death.

The jinni explains that for the first hundred years of his imprisonment, he swore to enrich the person who frees him forever, but nobody freed him. For the second century of his imprisonment, he swore to grant his liberator great wealth, but still nobody freed him. After another century, he swore to grant three wishes to the person who frees him, yet nobody did so. After four hundred years of imprisonment, the jinni became enraged and swore to grant the person who frees him a choice of deaths.

The fisherman pleads for his life, but the jinni does not concede. The fisherman decides to trick the jinni. He asks the jinni how he managed to fit into the bottle. The jinni, eager to show off, shrinks and places himself back into the bottle to demonstrate his abilities. The fisherman quickly puts the cap back on and threatens to throw it back to the sea. The jinni pleads with the fisherman, who begins to tell the story of "The Wazir and the Sage Duban" as an example of why the jinni should have spared him.

Duban is a wise sage who is summoned to King Yunan to cure the king of his terrible leprosy. Duban cures him by having him play polo with a club tipped with medicine. The king is very grateful until a vizier tells him that if Duban could cure him that easily, he could also kill him just as quick. The king remains skeptical and the two exchange some moral tales.
The king recounts the tale of king Sindbad who accidentally killed his own falcon that was attempting to save him from being poisoned by vipers while the vizier recounts the story of a vizier who carelessly goaded a prince into almost getting eaten by a ghula during a hunting trip.
The stories are recited but eventually the king is won over to the vizier's side. The king tells Duban he will kill him and Duban says that after he is beheaded, the king must read from a special book to his head and he will hear the head speak. The king is amazed at this and Duban is prepared and executed as was chosen by the king. Duban is beheaded and the king licks his fingers and turns the pages of the book open to find nothing there. The book was poisoned and the king dies. The head tells him that if he had been grateful to Duban then God would have spared him, but since he had not spared him, then God would not spare the king either.

After the story, the jinni pleads for mercy, and swears to help him in return for being released. The fisherman accepts the bargain, and releases the jinni. The jinni then leads the fisherman to a pond with many exotic fish, and the fisherman catches four. Before disappearing, the jinni tells the fisherman to give the fish to the Sultan. The fisherman does so and is rewarded with money for presenting the fishes. However, every time a fish is fried, a person will appear and question them, and the fish answer. When the fish are flipped in the pan, it will be charred. Awed by the sight, the Sultan asks the fisherman where he got the fish and goes to the pond to uncover their mystery. When he reaches his destination, the Sultan finds a young man who is half man and half stone.

The young man recounts his story, as the story of "The Ensorcelled Prince".

The prince had been a famous monarch of his country and had married his cousin whom he loved. However, his cousin did not return his love, and each night would elope with a slave. She would drug the prince and leave the city gates to sleep with the slave. The prince found out about this by overhearing one of his slave girls talk about it and followed his wife out of the gate one night to find the slave and kill him. He struck the slave in the neck but only wounded him and left before finishing the job.

His wife spent the next three years in mourning and built a tomb for her still living lover. The prince put up with this for a while but eventually had enough and yelled at her that the slave was never coming back. Realizing he was the one who did this the wife cursed the prince and all the inhabitants of the city. She turned the prince into half stone and the inhabitants into fishes and placed them in a giant pond.

The Sultan hears this and then assists the Prince in his liberation and revenge. He kills the slave and then takes his place covered in bandages in the tomb. He speaks in a thick accent to the wife when she arrives. He tells her if she'd change back the prince and the inhabitants he would be cured and they could pursue their love once more. She does as he commands and when she comes to greet him, the king pulls out his sword and cuts her in two.

The king and the now-cured prince become close friends, and the fisherman who first found the fish is rewarded with his son being appointed the Sultan's treasurer, and the Sultan and the Prince marry the fisherman's two beautiful daughters.

== Analysis ==
The story is classified in the international Aarne-Thompson-Uther Index as tale type ATU 331, "The Spirit in the Bottle". According to scholars Ulrich Marzolph, Richard van Leewen and Stith Thompson, similar stories have appeared as literary treatments in the Middle Ages (more specifically, since the 13th century), although Marzolph and van Leewen argue that the literary treatments derive from legends about King Solomon.

This tale type is of Jewish and Arabian origin, later appearing in Europe during the Middle Ages.

== Adaptations ==
=== Film ===
- The 1940 film The Thief of Baghdad borrows elements of this story.
- King Yunan from the Duban the Sage story appears in Pasolini's Arabian Nights portrayed by Salvatore Sapienza. However, his story is changed to the third dervish's tale involving the shipwreck at the magnetic mountain.

=== Television ===
- In the Disneyland TV series, this story was animated as a metaphoric tale of man harnessing nuclear power for the 1957 episode Our Friend the Atom, as seen here.
- The story was adapted for the seventeenth and eighteenth episodes of the Japanese anime series Arabian Nights: Sinbad's Adventures.

=== Literature ===
- Elements of the story appear within the Tim Powers novel, Declare.
- The sequence of a jinni only offering a choice of the manner of death for its savior appears within the Patricia C. Wrede novel, Dealing with Dragons.

== See also ==
- Aladdin
- The Spirit in the Bottle

== Bibliography ==
- (1955) The Arabian Nights Entertainments, New York: Heritage Press
- (2006) The Arabian Nights Reader, Marzolph, Ulrich, Wayne State University Press
