= The Blue Light (fairy tale) =

Literary work

Folk tale
- Name: The Blue Light
- Also known as: Das blaue Licht
- Aarne–Thompson grouping: ATU 562 (The Spirit in the Blue Light)
- Country: Germany
- Published in: Grimms' Fairy Tales

"The Blue Light" is a Brothers Grimm fairy tale about a soldier who finds a magical object that provides him a supernatural helper. Many of the features from Hans Christian Andersen's later work The Tinderbox and from the story of Aladdin and his magic lamp originate with this version. Other tales of this type include The Three Dogs and The Tinderbox.

== Synopsis ==
A soldier has been discharged from the king's service because of his wounds. The soldier leaves the castle and, as night falls, he requires somewhere to stay. Encountering the home of a witch, he asks her for lodging. The witch agrees on condition that he spade her garden the next day. This takes so long that he must stay another night, and in return she asks him to chop her wood. Once again, he must stay another night.

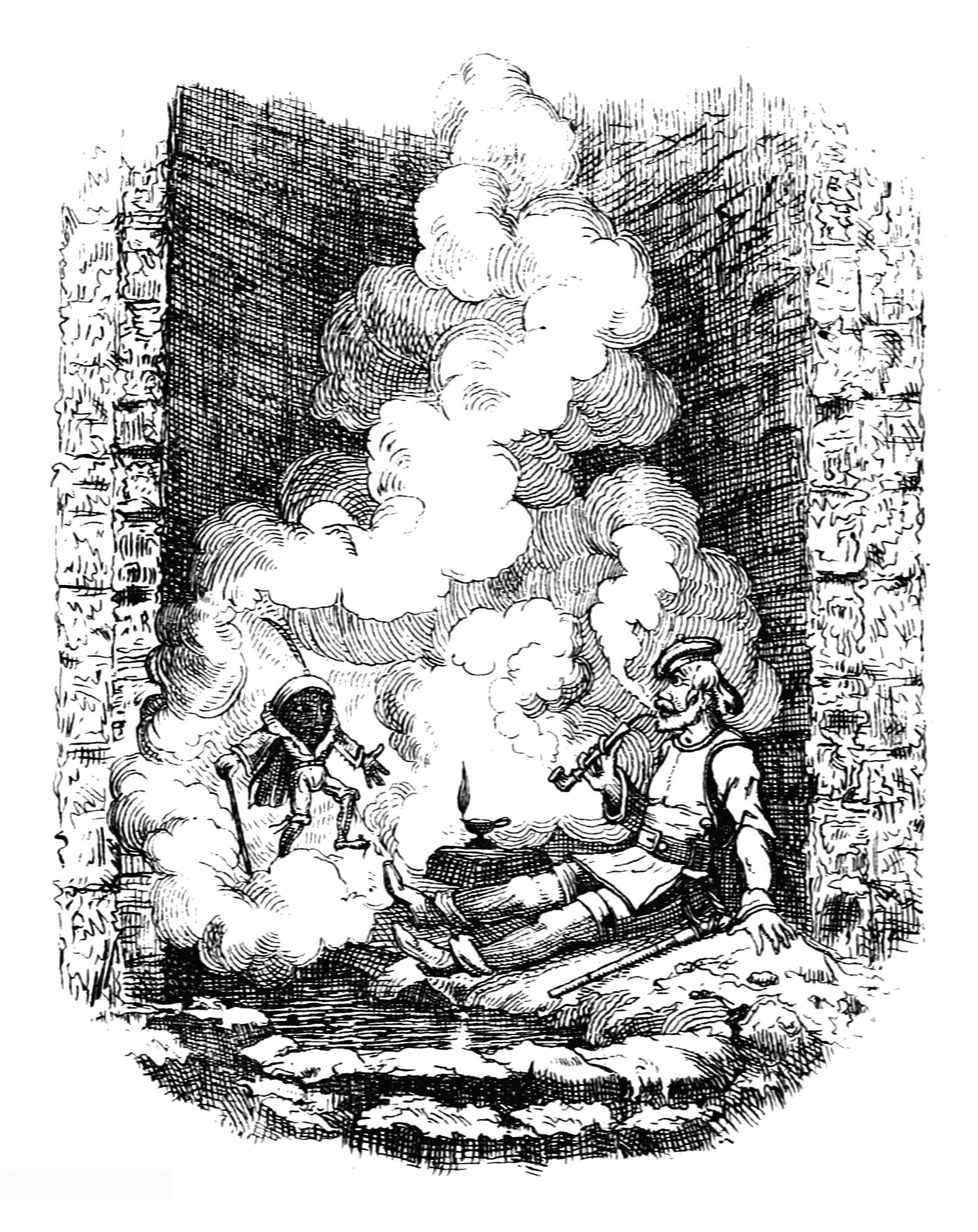
The soldier summons the Spirit in the Blue Light at the bottom of the well. Illustration by George Cruikshank for Grimm's Goblins, by Edgar Taylor (1823).

The following day, she requests that he go into a well and retrieve her blue light for her. He is in the process of doing so, but realizes he is being tricked and will be trapped in the well as soon as he gives it to her. When he refuses to hand over the light until he gets out, she gets upset and leaves him in the well. The soldier trapped in the well now has the light, but does not know what it is. He decides to smoke one last time and lights his pipe with the blue light. A dwarf appears to grant him whatever he wishes for. He first asks to be led out of the well, then for the witch to be taken to jail and hanged.

To retaliate against the king, the soldier commands the dwarf to bring him the princess so she can act as his maid. When she wakes up, the princess tells her father of her strange "dream", which the king believes could have actually happened. He has the princess fill her pocket with peas and put a little hole in it so that if she actually is carried away they will be able to follow the path.

The dwarf, however, notices, and spreads peas all over the city so that the peas lead to everywhere and cannot pin it on the soldier. The next night, she plans on hiding her shoe in the home to which she is taken. The dwarf warns against this to the soldier, but he does not heed it. The next day, the princess's shoe is found in his quarters and he is taken to jail. He sends his friend to get the blue light and as his final request asks for a last smoke of his pipe. The dwarf appears and kills the henchmen; the soldier also demands the king's life, but spares him after he begs for mercy. The soldier marries the princess and takes the throne.

== Analysis ==
=== Tale type ===
The tale is classified in the Aarne–Thompson–Uther Index as tale type ATU 562, "The Spirit in the Blue Light". In the Index, the story is situated next to two similar tale types: ATU 560, The Magic Ring, and ATU 561, Aladdin. All of these stories deal with a down-on-his-luck and impoverished boy or soldier, who finds a magical item (ring, lamp, tinderbox) that grants his wishes. In this regard, German folklorist Hans-Jörg Uther, in his revision of the international index, published in 2004, remarked that the similarities between the three tale types make it hard to differentiate them. On the other hand, per Stith Thompson's The Folktale, in type 562, Thompson remarked that, despite the great similarities between types 561 and 562, the "essential difference" lies in the accidental loss of the object by the hero. Similarly, Czech scholar Karel Horálek distinguishes the three types in that, in type 560, the hero is helped by animals (the snake gives the ring and the dog and the cat retrieve the stolen object); type 561 does away with the animals, leaving the hero to recover the stolen lamp with the second object, and, finally, type 562 inserts another person that helps the hero.

=== Motifs ===
==== The magical object ====
The hero finds the magical object in an underground room: a fire steel or a tinder box, but it can also be a book of the dark arts or a flute. The blue light in Hungarian tales is sometimes replaced by a tobacco pipe.
