= The Old Man at the White House =

English folk tale

The Old Man at the White House is an English folktale from Yorkshire published by Sidney Oldall Addy in 1897.

== Synopsis ==
A little girl named Sally receives a pair of yellow gloves from her mother. Despite her mother warning her not to lose them, she ends up losing one of the gloves. After searching for the glove among the people of the village, Sally goes to ask an old man who lives in a white house and who knows everything about everyone. The man has her glove, but he gives it to her on the condition that she does not tell anyone where she found it, otherwise he will come to get her in her bed at midnight. At home, Sally's mother, who had learned that she had lost the glove, manages to get her to tell her where she found it, and then she locks all the doors and windows. Nonetheless, at midnight Sally begins to hear the man outside her door who gradually tells her he is going up the stairs and finally enters her room to get her.

== Publication ==
Addy published the tale in December 1897 on volume 8 of Folk-Lore, by The Folklore Society. The story was told to him by C.R. Hirst, an eighteen year old from Sheffield.

== Variations ==
A similar Italian fairy tale from Romagna, Zio Lupo ("Uncle Wolf"), was published by Italo Calvino in his Italian Folktales collection from 1956. A Czech variation of the story titled O parádivé Sally ("About Dressy Sally"), was published in 1971 by Jan Vladislav in his book O kočičím králi a devět dalších hrůzostrašných pohádek ("About the Cat King and Nine Other Terrifying Tales").

== Adaptations ==
O parádivé Sally, a short animated adaptation of Vladislav version directed by Dagmar Doubková, was produced in 1976 in Czechoslovakia. Which was known on the internet as "Clockman," and being featured in the early Nickelodeon series, Pinwheel (TV series).

Emily's Red Gloves, a Japanese 10-minute adaptation was broadcast in 1977 in the anime television series Manga Fairy Tales of the World.
