= The Last Leaf =

1907 short story by O. Henry

- Short story by O. Henry
- Country: United States
- Language: English
- Genre: Short story

Publication
- Published in: The Trimmed Lamp and Other Stories
- Publication date: 1907

"The Last Leaf" is a short story by William Sydney Porter (O. Henry) published in his 1907 collection The Trimmed Lamp and Other Stories. It first appeared on October 15, 1905, in the New York World.

== Summary ==
The story is set in Greenwich Village during a pneumonia epidemic. It tells the story of an old artist who saves the life of a young neighbouring artist, dying of pneumonia, by giving her the will to live. Through her window, she can see an old ivy creeper (growing on a nearby wall), gradually shedding its leaves, as autumn turns into winter, and she has taken the thought into her head that she will die when the last leaf falls. The leaves fall day by day, but the last lone leaf lingers on for several days, giving her motivation to recover and live her life. The ill woman's health quickly recovers. At the story's end, we learn that the old artist, who always wanted to produce a masterpiece painting but had never had any success, spent considerable time painting with great realism a leaf on the wall during the night. Furthermore, the old artist himself dies of pneumonia contracted while being out in the wet and cold.

The scene of the story of "The Last Leaf" is the Greenwich artist colony in New York City. Over the past century, it has developed from a poor literati settlement to a world-famous art center and tourist attraction.

== Characters ==
- Sue, a young artist.
- Johnsy, another young artist who lives with Sue. She has pneumonia but survives due to the presence of the last leaf of an ivy plant.

== Adaptations ==
"The Last Leaf" has been adapted frequently on the stage and the big screen. Notable short film adaptations include

- The 1912 film Falling Leaves is a very loose adaptation.
- The 1917 two-reel silent film The Last Leaf, one of a series of O. Henry works produced by Broadway Star Features.
- In 1952 it was one of five stories adapted for O. Henry's Full House. In this adaptation, the protagonist's nickname is Jo, and Susan (Sue) is portrayed as her sister.
- In 1977 the 48th episode in the first season of the Japanese anime "Manga Fairy Tales of the World". The adaptation depicts Johnsy as a little girl living with her mother.
- In 1983 a screen adaptation was done as a 24-minute film produced by the Church of Jesus Christ of Latter-day Saints. This adaptation is the same as the 1952 film version from O. Henry's Full House.
- The 1986 Hindi TV series Katha Sagar adapted this for its seventh episode "Kalakriti" ('art form'), which was directed by Shyam Benegal.
- Paranoia Agent's 9th 'Etc.' episode contains a segment depicting it within the context of the series.
- The 2013 Hindi film Lootera is loosely based on "The Last Leaf".
- The 21st episode of the Pokémon Sun and Moon anime features a Stoutland on the brink of death. The symbol of its death, the dying tree, is a reference to the story.
- The 20th episode in the 3rd season of Osomatsu-san anime features a comedic parody of the story.
- The episode from the 2007 Doraemon anime series called "When the Last Leaf Falls", shows one of the side characters "Little G", falling ill and believing that the maple tree next to her bed losing leaves symbolizes the time she has left before "mountain goblins", take her away. Due to the book she reads throughout the episode having the same premise.
- The NCERT Class 9 Textbook "Moments" has this as a chapter in India for NCERT students.
