= The Tinderbox =

- Short story by Hans Christian Andersen
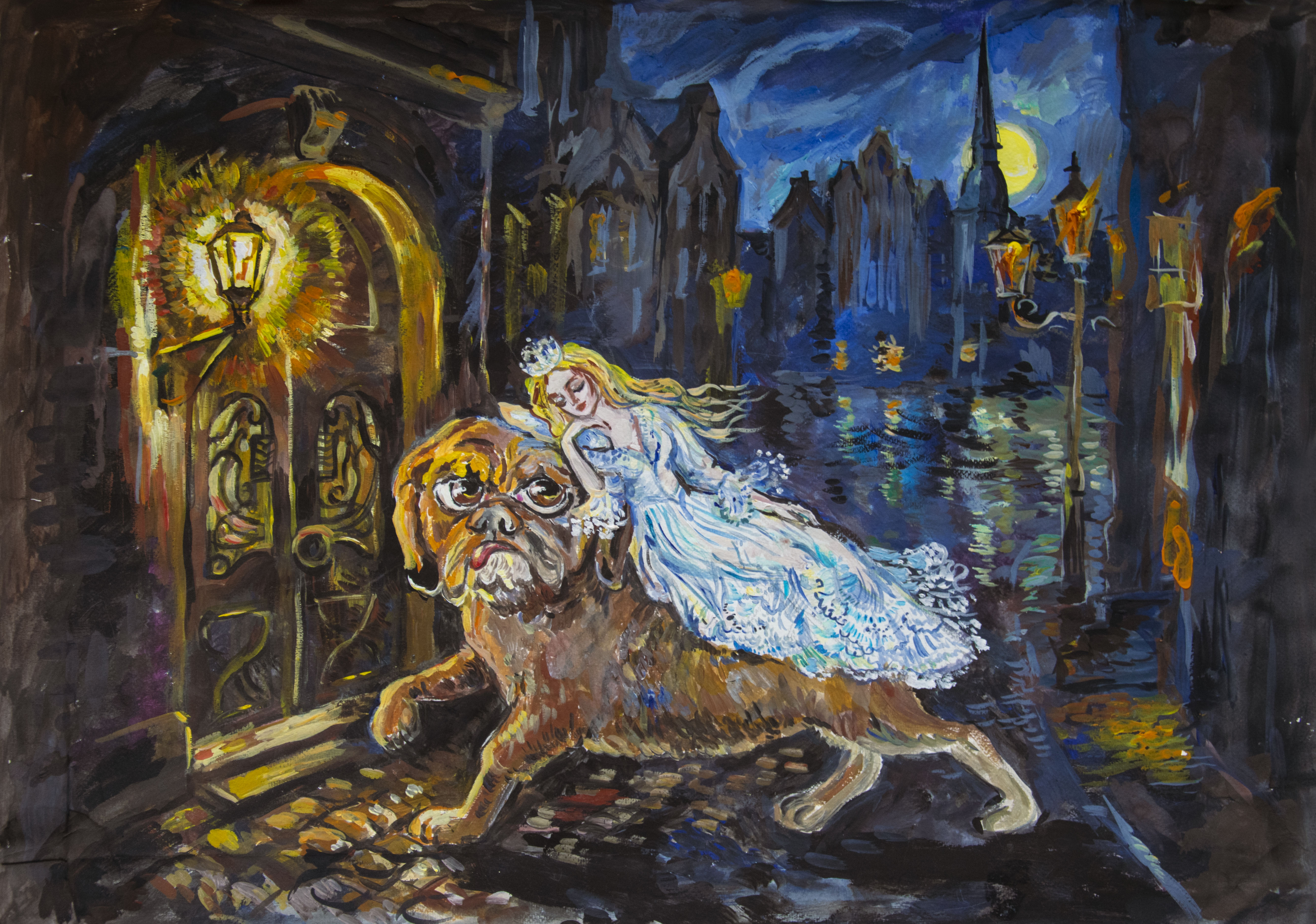
- The Tinderbox - Illustration by Elena Ringo
- Original title: Fyrtøiet
- Translator: Charles Boner
- Country: Denmark
- Language: Danish
- Genre: Literary fairy tale

Publication
- Published in: Fairy Tales Told for Children. First Collection. First Booklet. 1835.
- Publication type: Fairy tale collection
- Publisher: C. A. Reitzel
- Media type: Print
- Publication date: 8 May 1835
- Published in English: 1846

Chronology
The Improvisatore	Little Claus and Big Claus

"The Tinderbox" (Danish: Fyrtøjet) is a literary fairy tale by Hans Christian Andersen about a soldier who acquires a magic tinderbox capable of summoning three powerful dogs to do his bidding. When the soldier has one of the dogs transport a sleeping princess to his room, he is sentenced to death but cunningly summons the dogs to save his life.

In the Aarne-Thompson tale index, "The Tinderbox" is type 562: The Spirit in the Blue Light. Other tales of this type include The Three Dogs and The Blue Light.

== Synopsis ==
The story opens with a poor soldier returning home from war. He meets a witch, who asks him to climb into a hollow tree to retrieve a magic tinderbox. The witch gives the man permission to take anything he finds inside the chambers, but he must return the tinderbox. In the tree, he finds three chambers filled with precious coins guarded by three monstrous dogs, "one with eyes the size of teacups", who guards a vault filled with pennies, one with "eyes the size of water wheels", who guards a vault filled with silver, and one with eyes "the size of Round Tower", who guards a vault filled with gold. He fills his pockets with money, finds the tinderbox, and returns to the witch. When she demands the tinderbox without giving a reason, the soldier lops off her head with his sword.

In the following scene, the soldier enters a large city and buys himself splendid clothing and lives in a magnificent apartment. He makes many friends. He learns of a princess kept in a tower after a prophecy foretold her marriage to a common soldier; his interest is piqued and he wants to see her but realizes his whim cannot be satisfied. Eventually, the soldier's money is depleted and he is forced to live in a dark attic. He strikes the tinderbox to light the room, and one of the dogs appears before him. The soldier then discovers he can summon all three dogs and order them to bring him money from their subterranean dwelling. He does that and resumes living splendidly.

One night, he recalls the story of the princess in the locked tower, and desires to see her. He strikes the tinderbox and sends the dog with eyes the size of teacups to bring her to his apartment. The soldier is overwhelmed with her beauty, kisses her and orders the dog to return her to the tower. The following morning, the princess tells her parents she has had a strange dream and relates the night's adventure. The royal couple then watch her closely. When the princess is carried away again, they unsuccessfully use a trail of flour and chalk marks on neighborhood doors to find where she spends her nights. Eventually, her whereabouts are discovered and the soldier put in prison and sentenced to death. The tinderbox got left behind, so he cannot summon its help.

On the day of his execution, the soldier sends a boy for his tinderbox, and, at the scaffold, asks to have a last smoke. He then strikes the tinderbox and the three monstrous dogs appear. They toss the judge and the councillors, the King and Queen into the air. All are killed when they fall to earth. The soldier and the princess are united, and the dogs join the wedding feast.

== Commentaries ==
Andersen biographer Jackie Wullschlager writes, "["The Tinderbox"] is a confident, young man's tale—jaunty, brisk, and exhilarating. It celebrates youth over age and it has the energy and hope and satisfaction of a traditional folk tale—"Aladdin", "Puss in Boots", "Jack and the Beanstalk"—whose young hero overcomes adversity and ends a contented, successful adult."

== Adaptations ==
- The Tinderbox (1946) was the first full-length Danish animated feature film, directed by Svend Methling and animated by Børge Ring.
- The Tinder Box (1959) is an East German film based on the story.
- In 2007, "The Tinderbox" was adapted into a 30-minute ballet with sets and costumes designed by Queen Margrethe II. The ballet opened in the Pantomime Theatre of Copenhagen's Tivoli Gardens in July 2007. It was the third time the monarch designed a ballet for Tivoli based on Andersen's works.
- Lucy Corin's "Eyes of Dogs", a version of "The Tinderbox," appeared in 2013 as a short story in her One Hundred Apocalypses and Other Apocalypses.
- Ginger's Tale is a 2020 Russian traditional animation film loosely based on the fairy tale that features a magical artifact similar to the Tinderbox that grants the ability to summon gold and only a noble friend, Ginger can help save the wielder of the artifact from its effects
- In the 1950s Sir Michael Redgrave made a recording (12 inch vinyl, 33 1/3) titled "Tales of Hans Christian Andersen" in which he reads "The Tinderbox" and other stories. This recording was briefly reviewed in "Billboard" dated 30 June 1958. In "Selected Lists of Children's Books and Recordings" by the American Library Association, Children's Services Division, the recording is referred to as "Caedmon TC 1073" and as "Distinguished reading, faithful to the R.P. Keigwin text". It is also available as part of an audiobook entitled "The Very Best of Hans Christian Anderson" (note this non-standard spelling of his name) and on music sites such as Spotify.
- In 2013, Sally Gardner published Tinder, a dark YA fantasy book loosely based on "The Tinderbox", illustrated by David Roberts.
- In 2026, M. R. Carey published a dark fantasy book, The Tinder Box, based on the folktale.

=== Video game ===
In 1985, Gremlin Graphics released a ZX Spectrum-only children's adventure game titled Tinderbox, of which all profit went to the Ethiopian famine relief fund through Soft Aid. In the game, written by Colin C. Chadburn, a wounded foot soldier named Tom must defeat a wicked witch and an evil king who together cruelly rule the country in order to save and marry the beautiful Princess Rowella. Tom does not kill the villains, instead he just scares the witch-queen away and banishes the king.

Tinderbox received mixed reviews, ranging from only one out of five stars from Sinclair User, to the scores of 7/10 from both Crash and Your Spectrum. According to Home Computing Weekly, "the game could have been a massive hit" if only it was written in The Quill instead of BASIC.
