= Agnes Sapper =

German novelist (1852–1929)

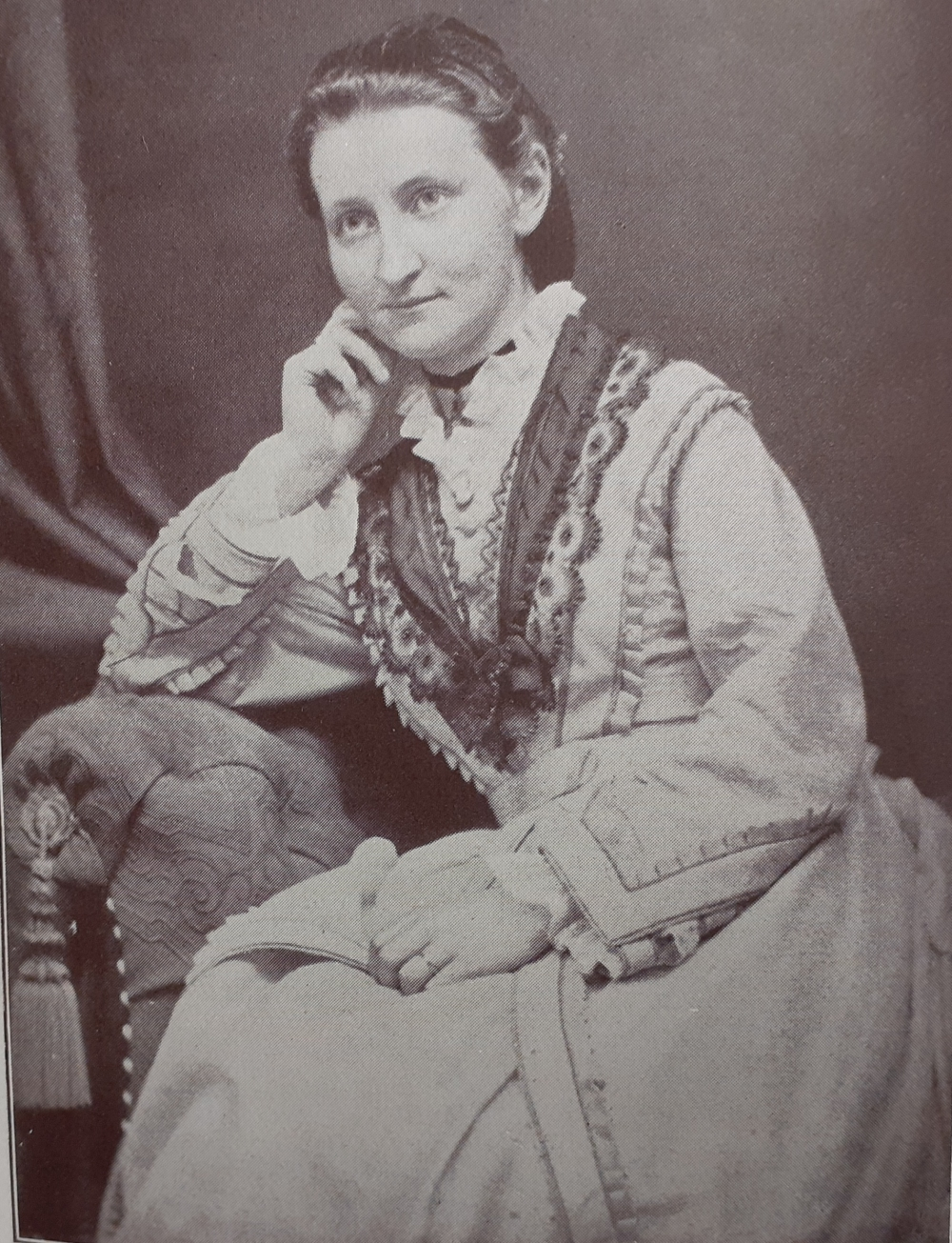
- Agnes Sapper
- Born: Agnes Brater; 12 April 1852; Munich, Germany
- Died: 19 March 1929 (aged 76); Würzburg, Germany
- Occupations: Short story writer, novelist
- Writing career
- Genre: Children's literature
- Notable work: Die Familie Pfäffling

Agnes Sapper (12 April 1852 – 19 March 1929) was a German author of children's literature.

== Biography ==
Sapper was the daughter of Karl Brater, a lawyer, politician, and founder of the Süddeutsche Zeitung, and his wife Pauline Pfaff. In 1875, she married Eduard Sapper, a journalist at Blaubeuren. The couple had three sons, two of whom died in childhood. In 1882, the family moved to Neckartailfingen, where two daughters, Anna and Agnes, were born, then to Esslingen am Neckar in 1888, and to Calw three years later.

Encouraged by her husband, Sapper began her writing career in 1882, publishing her first novella In Wasserfluten ("In Floods"). She recounted her experiences as a Sunday school teacher in other novellas: Das erste Schuljahr ("The First School Year", 1894) and Gretchen Reinwalds letztes Schuljahr ("Gretchen Reinwald's Final School Year", 1901). In 1898, after her husband's death, she moved to Würzburg and devoted herself entirely to writing. Her greatest success was with the novel Die Familie Pfäffling ("The Pfäffling Family", 1907), which describes the daily life of a close-knit family centered around their mother, Pauline. The novel was followed by a sequel: Werden und Wachsen ("Becoming and Growing"). She became the most successful author of children's literature in Germany at the beginning of the 20th century, alongside Johanna Spyri and Ottilie Wildermuth.

Upon her death, she bequeathed her house and royalties to the city of Würzburg, which turned it into a center for the mentally ill. Agnes Sapper's grave is located in the city cemetery.

In 2006, her grave was spared destruction at the last moment due to renovations. The Diakonie Deutschland – Evangelischer Bundesverband took over her grave for about fifteen years.

== Bibliography ==
The following is a list of her main books:

- In Wasserfluten. Erzählung (1893)
- Das erste Schuljahr. Eine Erzählung für Kinder von 7–12 Jahren (1894)
- Die Mutter unter ihren Kindern. Ein Büchlein für Mütter (1895)
- Gretchen Reinwald’s letztes Schuljahr. Eine Erzählung für Mädchen von 13–16 Jahren (1901)
- Das kleine Dummerle und andere Erzählungen. Zum Vorlesen im Familienkreise (1904)
- Die Familie Pfäffling. Eine deutsche Wintergeschichte (1907)
- Frau Pauline Brater. Lebensbild einer deutschen Frau (1908)
- Werden und Wachsen. Erlebnisse der großen Pfäfflingskinder (1910)
- Erziehen oder Werdenlassen? (1912)
- Lieschens Streiche und andere Erzählungen (1907)
- Mutter und Tochter. Erzählung (1913)
- Urschele hoch! Ein Lustspiel für das Haustheater in 3 Auftritten (1913)
- Kriegsbüchlein für unsere Kinder (1914)
- Im Thüringer Wald (1914)
- Kriegsgeschichten: Erzählung aus dem Kriege (1915)
- Ohne den Vater: Erzählung aus dem Kriege (1915)
- Das Enkelhaus. Ein Kinderbuch (1917)
- Ein Gruß an die Freunde meiner Bücher (1922)
- In Not bewährt. Fünf Erzählungen (1922)
- Lili. Erzählung aus dem Leben eines mutterlosen Kindes (1924)
- Im Familienkreis: Kleine Lustspiele für die Jugend (1926)
- Die Heimkehr und andere Erzählungen aus Krieg und Frieden (1938)
- Im Thüringer Wald und andere Geschichten von früher (1965)

== Adaptations ==
Die Familie Pfäffling was particularly successful in Japan, where it was published in 1930 as "The Family of Love". In 1978, it was adapted into four episodes of the anthology anime series Manga Fairy Tales of the World.
