= Thumbelina =

Fairy tale by Hans Christian Andersen

- Short story by Hans Christian Andersen
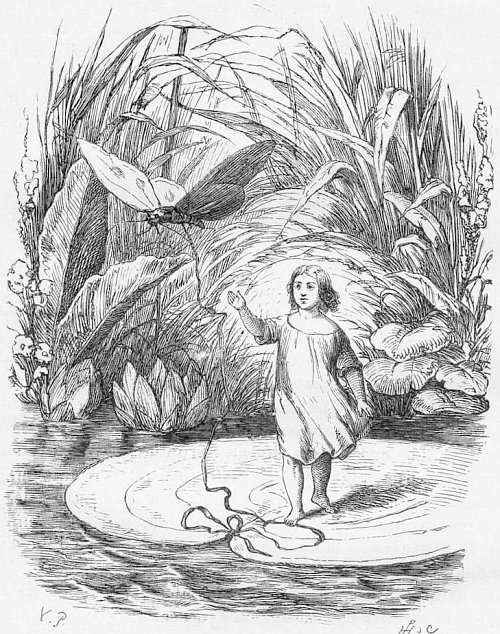
- Illustration by Vilhelm Pedersen, Andersen's first illustrator

Text available at Wikisource
- Original title: Tommelise
- Translator: Mary Howitt
- Country: Denmark
- Language: Danish
- Genre: Literary fairy tale

Publication
- Published in: Fairy Tales Told for Children. First Collection. Second Booklet. 1835. (Eventyr, fortalte for Børn. Første Samling. Andet Hefte. 1835.)
- Publication type: Fairy tale collection
- Publisher: C. A. Reitzel
- Media type: Print
- Publication date: 16 December 1835
- Published in English: 1846

Chronology
Little Ida's Flowers	The Naughty Boy

Thumbelina (/ˌθʌmbəˈliːnə/; Danish: Tommelise) is a literary fairy tale written by Danish author Hans Christian Andersen. It was first published by C. A. Reitzel on 16 December 1835 in Copenhagen, Denmark, with "The Naughty Boy" and "The Travelling Companion" in the second installment of Fairy Tales Told for Children. Thumbelina is about a tiny girl and her adventures with marriage-minded toads, moles, and cockchafers. She successfully avoids their intentions before falling in love with a flower-fairy prince just her size.

== Plot ==
A woman yearning for a child asks a witch for advice and is presented with a barleycorn, which she is told to go home and plant. (In the first English translation of 1847 by Mary Howitt, the tale opens with a beggar woman giving a peasant's wife a barleycorn in exchange for food). After the barleycorn is planted and sprouts, a tiny girl named Thumbelina (Tommelise) emerges from its flower.

One night, Thumbelina, asleep in her walnut-shell cradle, is carried off by a toad who wants her as a bride for her son. With the help of a friendly fish and a butterfly, Thumbelina escapes the toad and her son. She drifts on a lily pad until she is captured by a beetle who later discards her when his friends reject her company.

Thumbelina tries to protect herself from the elements. When winter comes, she is in desperate straits. She is finally given shelter by an old field mouse, whose dwelling she tends to in gratitude. Thumbelina sees a swallow who is injured while visiting a mole, a neighbor of the field mouse. She meets the swallow one night and finds out what happened to him. She keeps on visiting the swallow at midnight without telling the field mouse and tries to help him gain strength. She frequently spends time with him by singing songs, telling him stories and listening to his stories in the winter until spring arrives. The swallow, after becoming healthy, promises that he will come to that spot again and flies away, saying goodbye to Thumbelina.

At the end of winter, the mouse suggests Thumbelina marry the mole, but Thumbelina finds the prospect of being married to such a creature repulsive; he spends all his days underground and never sees the sun or sky, although he is impressive with his knowledge of ancient history and lots of other topics. The field mouse insists the mole is a good match for her. Eventually, Thumbelina sees little choice but to agree.

At the last minute, Thumbelina escapes the situation by fleeing to a far land with the swallow. In a sunny field of flowers, Thumbelina meets a tiny flower-fairy prince just her size and to her liking; they eventually wed. She receives a pair of wings to accompany her husband on his travels from flower to flower, and a new name, Maia. Their wedding leaves the swallow heartbroken and he flies off, eventually arriving at a small house. There, he tells Thumbelina's story to a man (implied to be Andersen himself) who chronicles the story in a book.

== Adaptations ==
=== Animation ===
The earliest animated version of the tale is a silent black-and-white release by director Herbert M. Dawley in 1924. Lotte Reiniger released a 10-minute cinematic adaptation in 1954 featuring her "silhouette" puppets.

In 1964, Soyuzmultfilm released Dyuymovochka, a half-hour Russian adaptation of the fairy tale directed by Leonid Amalrik. Although the screenplay by Nikolai Erdman stayed faithful to the story, it was noted for satirical characters and dialogues (many of them turned into catchphrases).

Toei Animation adapted the fairy tale three times: in 1975 as an animated short, in 1978 in the feature-length anime film Thumbelina, and as an episode of World Fairy Tale Series.

In 1990, Hanna-Barbera and Hallmark Cards produced a straight-to-video featurette based on the story, for the series Timeless Tales from Hallmark.

In 1992, Golden Films released Thumbelina (1992), and Tom Thumb Meets Thumbelina afterwards. A Japanese animated series adapted the plot and made it into a movie, Thumbelina: A Magical Story (1992), released in 1993.

On March 30, 1994, Warner Bros. Pictures released the animated film Thumbelina (1994), directed by Don Bluth and Gary Goldman, with Jodi Benson as the voice of Thumbelina.

The 2002 animated film The Adventures of Tom Thumb and Thumbelina is loosely based on the fairy tale. Mattel's Barbie Presents: Thumbelina from 2009 was also presented as a modern retelling of the story, while its plot has from little to nothing to do with Andersen's tale.

In 2021, at the New York International Children's Film Festival, premiered the short film Tulip, a contemporary version of the classic Hans Christian Andersen fairytale Thumbelina. Phoebe Wahl was the writer and lead character designer, as well as co-director and co-producer alongside animator and fiber-artist Andrea Love.

=== Live action ===
An adaptation of the Thumbelina story directed by Barry Mahon was included as an embedded narrative in the 1972 low-budget film Santa and the Ice Cream Bunny.

On June 11, 1985, a television dramatization of the tale was broadcast as the 12th episode of the anthology series, Faerie Tale Theatre. The production starred Carrie Fisher.

=== Video Games ===
The 2015 otome game Zettai Meikyuu Himitsu no Oyayubi-hime features Thumbelina as its protagonist, romancing both male and female characters based on other stories by Andersen.
