= The Straw, the Coal, and the Bean =

German fairy tale

Folk tale
- Name: The Straw, the Coal, and the Bean
- Aarne–Thompson grouping: ATU 295
- Country: Germany
- Published in: Grimms' Fairy Tales

"The Straw, the Coal, and the Bean" (German: Strohhalm, Kohle und Bohne) is the eighteenth story in Grimm's Fairy Tales. It is Aarne-Thompson number 295.

== Synopsis ==
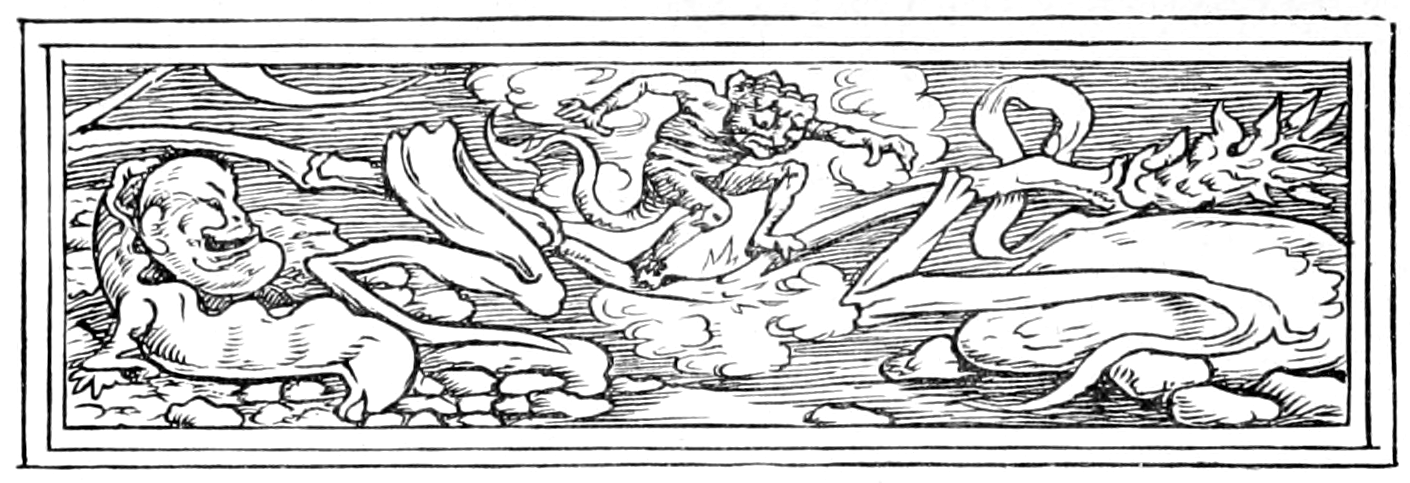

An old woman has some beans that she intends to cook over her fire. Being in a hurry, she grabs some straw to make the fire light faster. She pours the beans in the pot and, being in a hurry, she drops one on the floor which lands next to a piece of straw. Soon the fire is burning nicely and a hot coal jumps out and lands next to the straw and the bean. They discuss that they have narrowly escaped the fire, and they band together to flee.

At a river, the straw lies down to let them cross. The coal, being hot-tempered by nature, immediately sets across. But when the coal is halfway across, the water rushes underneath, and the coal becomes terrified of being drowned. So he stops, too afraid to go on. The straw catches on fire from the coal and splitting in two, the straw and the coal are swept downstream.

The bean cannot help but laugh at the misfortune of his comrades, and indeed he laughs so hard that he bursts his side. He is in trouble, but luckily there is a friendly tailor nearby who sews him back up with some black thread, and ever since beans have had a black seam.

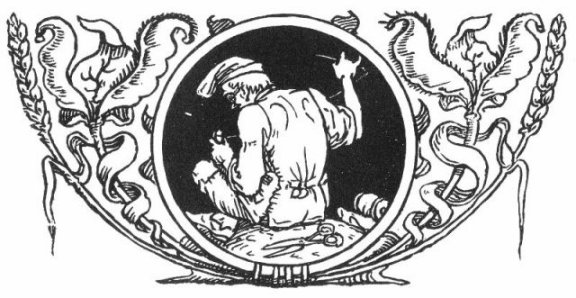
Illustrations by Walter Crane

== Variants ==
Japanese scholar Kunio Yanagita listed some variants of The Charcoal, The Straw, and the Bean (Sumi to wara to mame, Sumi to warashibe to mame) found in Japan, and even remarked that it was part of a group of tales speculated to have been imported into Japan.
