= The Heart of a Monkey =

Swahili folk story

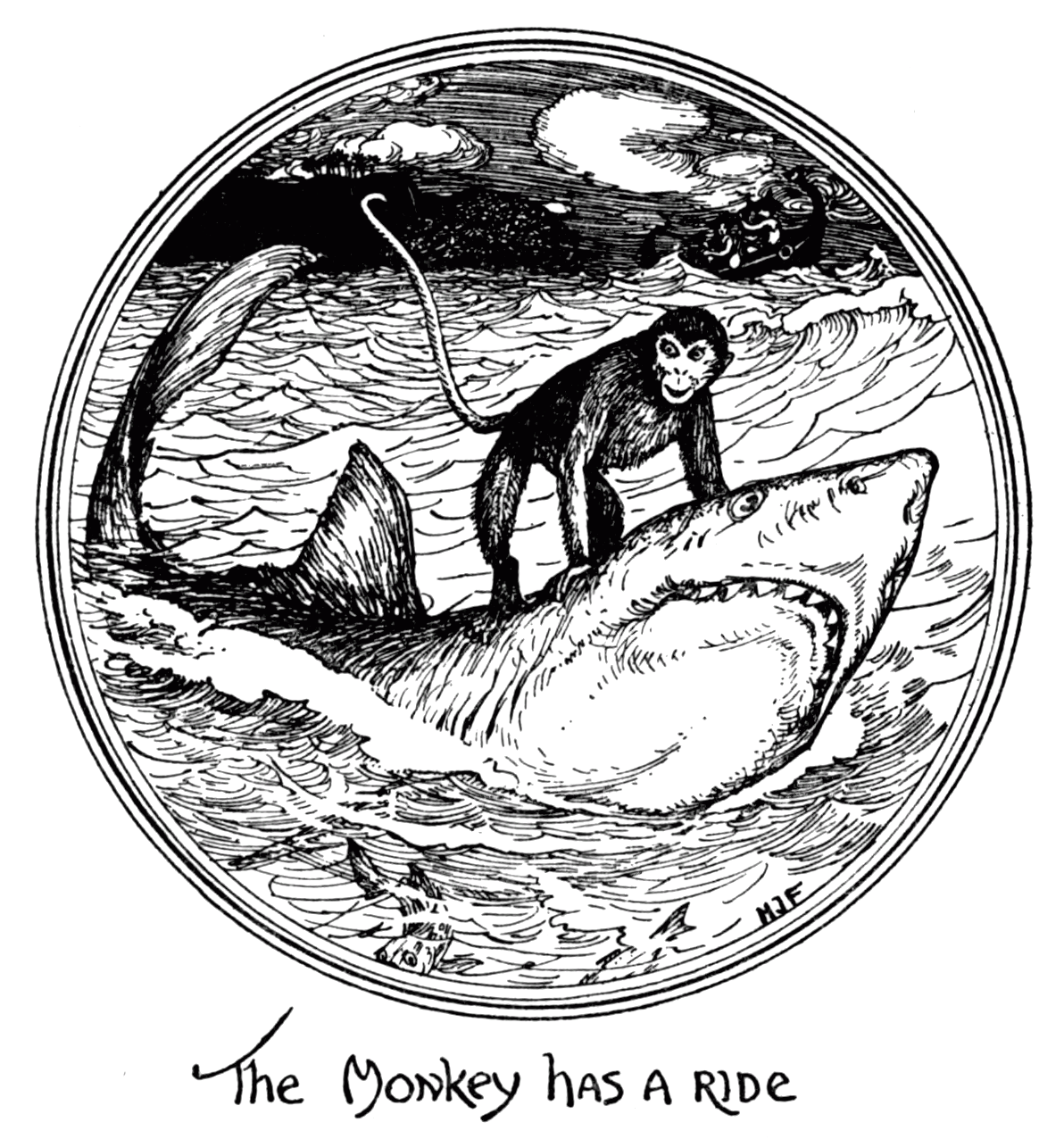

The Heart of a Monkey is a Swahili fairy tale collected by Edward Steere in Swahili Tales. Andrew Lang included it in The Lilac Fairy Book. It is Aarne-Thompson 91.

== Synopsis ==
A monkey and a shark struck up a friendship, with the monkey tossing his friend the fruits of a giant mku yu tree that grew overhanging the ocean. After a time, the shark said if the monkey would only come home with him, he would give him a gift, and offered to carry him. The monkey accepted, but half way there, the shark told him that the sultan of his country was deathly ill and needed a monkey's heart to cure him. The monkey said it was a pity, because if he had known, he could have brought his heart, but as it was, he had left it behind. The shark, deceived, brought him back to get it. The monkey instantly jumped up into the tree and was not to be lured back down. He told the shark a story of a washerman's donkey, which was twice persuaded to meet with a lion, and so lost its life the second time — and that the monkey was not a washerman's donkey.

== Versions ==
=== India ===
An earlier version of this tale, with a crocodile instead of a shark, serves as the frame tale for the fourth book of the Panchatantra. In this version it is the crocodile's wife who, after enjoying the figs given by the monkey to her husband, desires to eat the monkey's heart. Whereas the Swahili version has only one embedded tale, in the Panchatantra version the monkey and crocodile tell each other numerous tales in the course of their story, the second of which corresponds to the story of the washerman's donkey.

=== Japan ===
Folklorist Seki Keigo stated that the tale is "very popular" in Japan, and reported an ancient Japanese version from the 11th century, in the Konjaku Monogatarishū.

== Commentary ==
J. R. R. Tolkien in his On Fairy-Stories cites this tale as an example of not a true fairy tale, because while the detached heart is a common fairy-tale motif, it appears in it only as a ploy.

== See also ==
- Signifying monkey
