= The Spirit in the Bottle =

German fairy tale

Folk tale
- Name: The Spirit in the Bottle
- Aarne–Thompson grouping: ATU 331
- Country: Germany
- Published in: Grimms' Fairy Tales

"The Spirit in the Bottle" (German: Der Geist im Glas) is a German fairy tale collected by the Brothers Grimm, tale number 99. In the Aarne–Thompson–Uther Index, it is type 331. It is of Jewish and Arabian origin, later appearing in Europe during the Middle Ages.

== Synopsis ==
Once upon a time, there was an old woodcutter and his young son. The woodcutter always wanted his son to go to school, but they didn't have enough money, and after a few years he had to come home. The son insisted on going to the woods to work with his father, but the father didn't think he could handle the hard work. During a lunch break, instead of resting, he defied his father and went wandering through the forest, where he heard a voice saying it was trapped at the bottom of the tree. There he saw a bottle, but when he opened it a giant demon sprang out and said it would break his neck and kill him. The young woodcutter then challenged the demon spirit, saying that it did not have the ability to get back in the bottle. So the spirit, to show that he really could do whatever he wanted, re-entered the bottle to show the boy how strong he was, and the boy stopped the bottle up again. The demon, shocked, began begging the woodcutter's son to open the bottle again, but he refused unless the spirit promised to benefit the boy.

The spirit pleaded with him and offered to make him rich. The boy decided it was worth the risk and released the demon. The spirit gave him a special cloth with one side that would turn any object into pure silver and the other side that would heal any wound. After turning his axe into silver, he tried to cut a tree in front of his father, but bent the axe head. The father was extremely disappointed that he would have to replace the axe, which belonged to his neighbor. The boy went to sell the axe head and made 400 times more money than he needed to pay for the broken axe, and finally he told his father the story of the spirit in the bottle.

After that, the father recognized that the boy's cleverness had made them rich and was happy. The boy went back to school to become a doctor and became one of the most successful and famous doctors with the help of his magical cloth that healed wounds.

=== Alternate version ===
In an alternative version, the son squanders the money he makes from his silver and is forced to make more silver with the cloth, which disappoints his father seeing that his son is greedy and lazy. Eventually his cloth falls into a fire, and he loses his wealth. Desperate to recover his wealth, he goes back to the woods looking for the spirit in the bottle to replace his cloth, only this time the spirit tricks the boy into taking his place in the bottle.

== In popular culture ==
- The Spirit in the Bottle is featured in Grimm's Fairy Tale Classics, where it uses the ending listed in the alternate version.

== See also ==
- Aladdin
- The Fisherman and the Jinni
