= Old Sultan =

German fairy tale

Folk tale
- Name: Old Sultan
- Aarne–Thompson grouping: ATU 101, ATU 103
- Country: Germany
- Published in: Grimm's Fairy Tales

"Old Sultan" (German: Der alte Sultan) is a German fairy tale collected by the Brothers Grimm (KHM 48).

The tale combines two different Aarne–Thompson-Uther types: ATU 101 ("The Old Dog as Rescuer of the Child") and ATU 103 ("War between Wild Animals and Domestic Animals"). The motif of "The War Between the Village Animals and the Forest Animals", formerly classified as AT 104, was merged with ATU 103 in Hans-Jörg Uther's new classification system in 2004. Another example of ATU 103 tale is the Bohemian "The Dog and the Wolf".

== Origin ==
The tale was published by the Brothers Grimm in a somewhat simpler form in the first edition of Kinder- und Hausmärchen (1812), and rewritten in its present form for the second edition (1819). Their source was Johann Friedrich Krause, from the town of Hof in Hessen.

== Synopsis ==
Sultan is the faithful dog of a farmer, but has now grown old. One day the farmer tells his wife he will kill Sultan because he has lost most of his teeth and seems useless as a guard dog. His wife begs him to reconsider, telling him how loyal Sultan has been to them for many years, but the farmer's mind is made up. Sultan hears and is very upset. He goes off to the woods to see his good friend the wolf. The wolf has an idea to save Sultan's life and tells him that the farmer and his wife will take their child haying the next day, and the wolf will carry him off. Sultan will chase him and free the child. Seeing their child safely returned, the farmer and his wife would be grateful and not kill Sultan.

The wolf's plan succeeds, and the farmer was so grateful that he has his wife make Sultan some bread soup and gives him a special cushion to sleep on.

The wolf then comes to visit Sultan and asks him to overlook him stealing sheep. Sultan refuses, saying that he cannot disobey his master, but the wolf thinks he is only jesting. That same night, the wolf tries to steal a sheep from the farm, but Sultan warns the farmer who then drives the wolf away. Thinking that Sultan has double-crossed him, the wolf vows revenge.

The next morning, the wolf goes to see another of his friends, a boar, and asks him to go and challenge Sultan to a fight in the woods. Sultan accepts the challenge, but can only find a three-legged cat to help him. As the wolf and boar are waiting, they mistake the cat's upraised tail for a sword and when the cat limps they think she is picking up rocks to throw. Terrified, they hide. The boar hides under a bush, and the cat bites one of his ears, mistaking it for a mouse. The boar runs away and tells Sultan and the cat that the wolf who has hidden himself in the branches of a tree is the one they want.

The two urge the wolf to climb down and surrender, which he does. The wolf feels extremely guilty for his actions and asks Sultan to forgive him, which he does, and they become good friends again.

== In popular culture ==
- Old Sultan was featured in Grimm's Fairy Tale Classics as part of the "Grimm Masterpiece Theater" season.
