= The Star Money =

German fairy tale

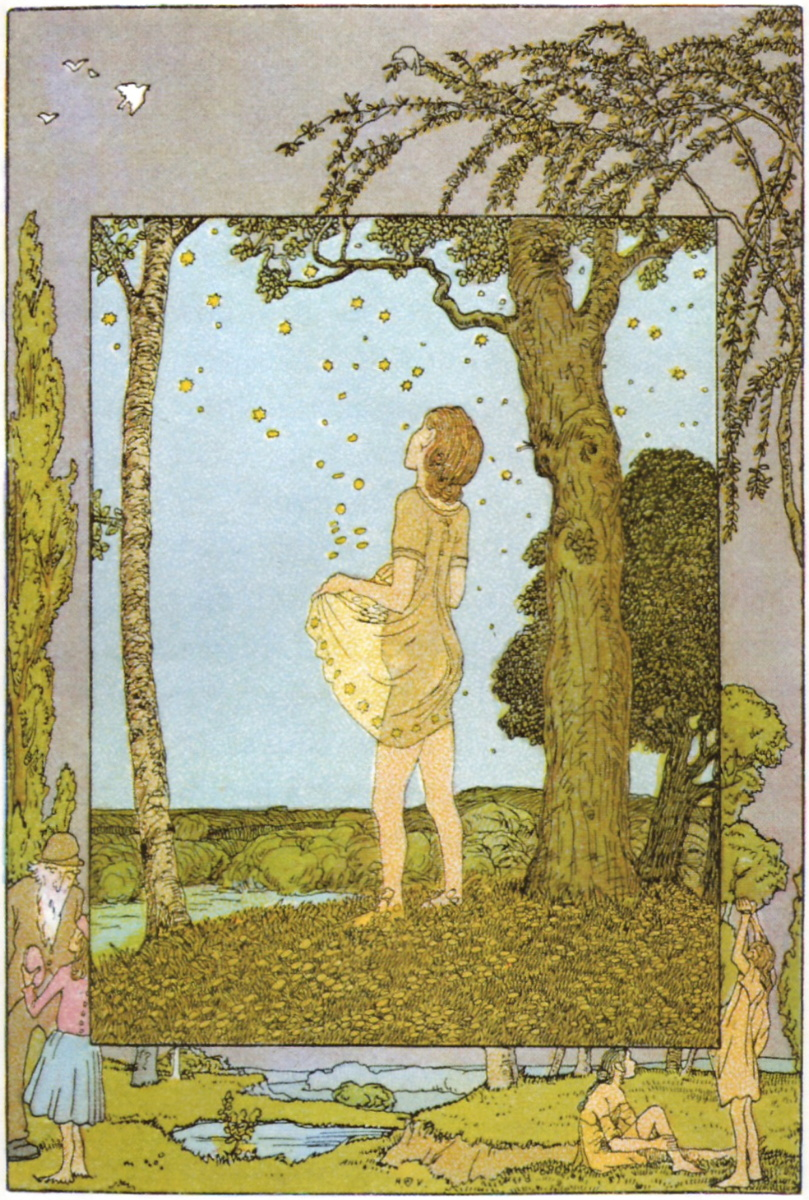
- Illustration by Heinrich Vogeler

Folk tale
- Name: The Star Money
- Also known as: The Star Talers
- Aarne–Thompson grouping: ATU 779
- Country: Germany
- Published in: Grimms' Fairy Tales

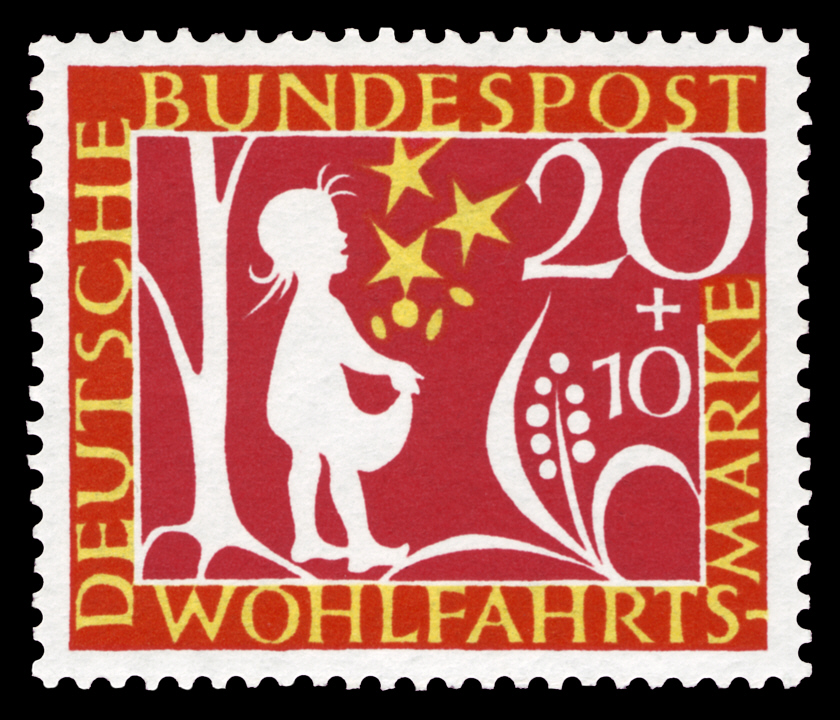
West German stamp illustrating "The Star Money"

"The Star Money" or "The Star Talers" (German: Die Sterntaler) is a German fairy tale collected by the Brothers Grimm in Grimm's Fairy Tales.

It is Aarne-Thompson type 779, Divine Rewards and Punishments.

== Synopsis ==
A goodhearted orphan girl has only her clothing and a loaf of bread that a kind soul has given her. She goes out into the countryside to see what might happen. She gives a hungry beggar her bread, and to three cold children she gives her winter hat, her jacket, and her dress. After wandering into a forest, she sees a naked child begging for a shift (long undergarment), and since it is dark and she cannot be seen, she gives her own away. As she stands there with nothing left at all, suddenly stars fall to earth before her, transforming into talers (silver coins), and she finds herself wearing a new dress of the finest linen. The story ends with her being rich.

== Other adaptations ==
There is another known version of this tale. It tells of a beautiful young girl named Natalie whose parents have fallen ill. She is sent to find a doctor, and meets many begging people along the way. She gives away everything but her shift, and when in the forest she meets yet another begging child asking for her shift. Natalie strips naked and gives her shift away, and then ends up spending three days and nights in the forest. On the fourth day, she is swimming in the lake and is greeted by her guardian angel, who tells her soon her generosity shall be rewarded. With that she leaves a towel and a clean set of clothing for Natalie. After Natalie dries herself and dresses again, the guardian angel sends stars falling from the sky before her, proven to be silver talers. Natalie gathers them up and after heading back to the village, she pays the doctor, and all goes well for her family, now that they are wealthy.
