= Little Claus and Big Claus =

Fairy tale by Hans Christian Andersen (1835)

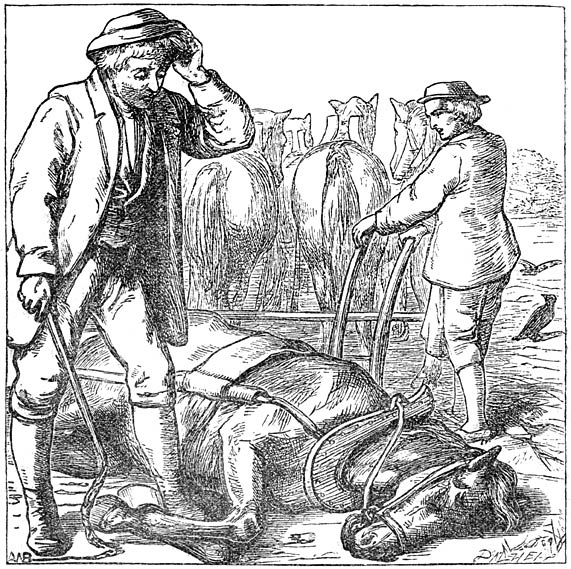
1895 illustration by Alfred Walter Bayes

"Little Claus and Big Claus" (Danish: Lille Claus og store Claus) is a literary fairy tale by Hans Christian Andersen, published in Danish in 1835 in the first instalment of his booklet Fairy Tales Told for Children. First Collection. (Danish title: Eventyr fortalte for børn. Første Samling.).

== Plot ==
In a village lived two men called Claus. In order to tell them apart, the one who owns only one horse is called Little Claus, and the other one, who owns four horses, is called Big Claus. Each week, Little Claus lends Big Claus his one horse to plow the fields. In return, on the weekend Little Claus borrows the horses from Big Claus to plough his own field. During this, he constantly calls them his five horses. Angry at this, as only one horse really belongs to Little Claus, Big Claus tells him to stop saying this. However, Little Claus does it again by accident, so Big Claus kills his neighbour's only horse. Little Claus skins it, puts the horse skin into a sack and carries the sack with him to sell it.

In the evening, Little Claus comes to a farm and asks for a place to sleep, but the farmer's wife refuses to let him in. Climbing to the roof of the barn, he soon discovers that she is being visited by the sexton, who came during her husband's absence as he hates sextons. When the farmer arrives home, she hides the wine and all the food she and the sexton were drinking and eating, and the sexton hides in a chest. When the farmer sees Little Claus on the barn's roof, he invites him to spend the night in his house. While eating gruel served by the farmer's wife, Little Claus steps on his sack, causing a noise. Little Claus claims that inside of the sack is a wizard, and that the wizard had filled the oven with food and wine for them, which the wife reluctantly brings out for them to eat instead. Fascinated by the wizard and drunken from the wine, the farmer asks if the wizard can conjure up the devil. Little Claus tells him to look in the chest, where the devil would hide, disguised as a sexton. Seeing the sexton in the chest, the farmer is convinced that there is a wizard in Little Claus' sack and buys it, giving him a bushel of money (8 imperial gallons) as well as the chest with the sexton inside.

When crossing a bridge, Little Claus pretends that he plans to throw the chest into the river, but the sexton convinces him not to and offers him money. Little Claus accepts and returns home with two bushels of money. Little Claus asks to borrow a bushel measure from Big Claus, and when the measure is returned, there are several coins sticking to it, greatly surprising Big Claus. Big Claus asks him how he got so much money, and Little Claus tells him that this is the money he got from selling his horse's skin, but he does not tell him about the circumstances. Greedy, Big Claus kills and skins his own horses and tries to sell them, but as he demands two bushels of money for it, the tanners do not buy them and beat him instead. Humiliated and angry, Big Claus decides to get revenge on his neighbor.

Meanwhile, Little Claus' grandmother dies. Despite the fact that she was not very nice to him, he puts her in his bed as a sign of a last honour, while he sleeps in a chair. That night, Big Claus comes in and hits the dead grandmother with an axe, believing her to be Little Claus. Little Claus takes his dead grandmother with him in order to bury her. When he halts at an inn, he tells the innkeeper, who has a bad temper, that his grandmother was relaxing and that he should bring her a glass of wine, but he should shout as she was deaf. Believing him, the innkeeper goes to the dead grandmother with the glass. When she does not answer him, he throws the glass at her, causing the corpse to fall from the wagon. Little Claus rushes outside and claims that the innkeeper killed his grandmother, showing him the hole in her head that was actually caused by the axe from the night before. The innkeeper offers to bury her as if she was his grandmother and also offers him a bushel of money for staying silent.

Hearing that Little Claus is alive, Big Claus meets him and asks him what happened. Little Claus claims that Big Claus killed his grandmother, who he sold for yet another bushel. Believing him again, Big Claus kills his own grandmother and asks the local chemist if he wants to buy a corpse. When asked about its origin, he tells him that it is his grandmother, who he killed to be paid a huge sum. The horrified chemist tells him what a terrible crime this is, resulting in Big Claus fleeing from the scene.

Furious, Big Claus puts Little Claus in a sack and carries him away to drown him in a river. When passing a church, Big Claus goes inside, leaving the sack with Little Claus near the street. An old man with his cattle passes him by. Hearing Little Claus whining that he is not meant to die while being so young, the old man comments that he is so old and still cannot go to heaven. Little Claus asks him to take his place in the sack, then he would go to heaven, and promises the old man to take care of his cattle. The old man accepts. Later, Big Claus comes out of the church and throws the sack with the old man inside into the river. When going homewards, he meets Little Claus with the cattle, who claims that the cattle are "sea cows," and that he got them from a woman living at the bottom of the river, who had promised Little Claus another herd at the other end. However, he claims, he is now walking there on land so he can avoid the river's curves and be faster. Big Claus wonders if he could also get cattle from the river woman, so Little Claus offers to put him in a sack and throw him into the river. Big Claus agrees and Little Claus puts a big stone into the sack to make sure he would reach the bottom. After having dropped his neighbour into the river, Little Claus leads his herd homewards, commenting that he fears that Big Claus will not find any cattle.

== Reception ==
The first review, which was published anonymously in Denmark in the newspaper Dannor in 1836, is not very positive:

No one can reasonably claim that the respect of life among children is encouraged by the reading of episodes such as Big Claus killing his grandmother and Little Claus killing him. This is told as if it is about slaughtering a bull.

Furthermore, in Dansk Litteraturtidende, another anonymous reviewer reproached Andersen for not having a sufficiently literary style, making a comparison to the writings of the Danish poet Christian Frederik Molbech, who, unlike Andersen, exposes a lesson in his stories.
