= Hans Christian Andersen =

Danish writer (1805–1875)

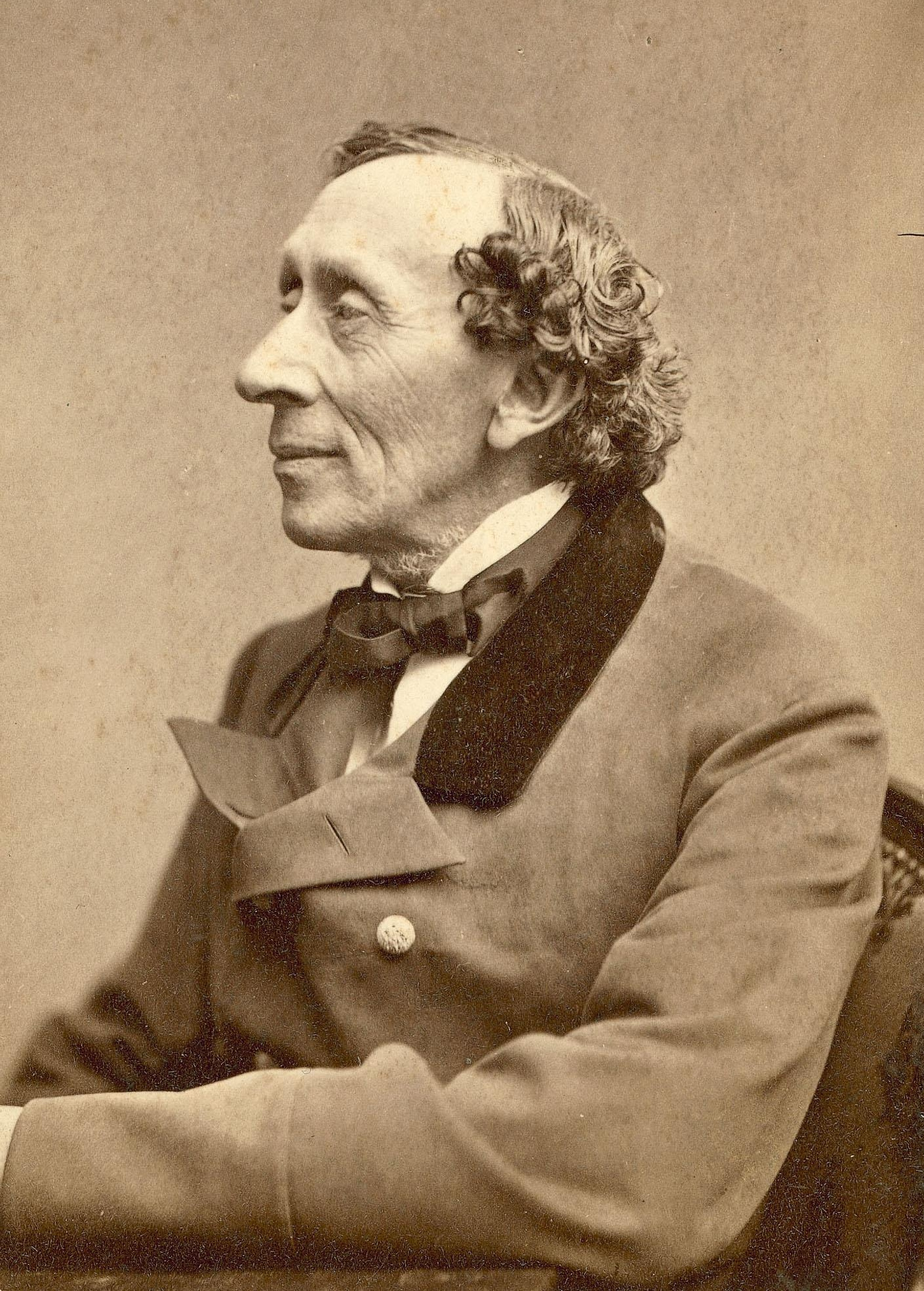
- Andersen in 1869
- Born: 2 April 1805; Odense, Funen, Denmark
- Died: 4 August 1875 (aged 70); Østerbro, Copenhagen, Denmark
- Resting place: Assistens Cemetery, Copenhagen (København)
- Occupation: Writer
- Writing career
- Period: Danish Golden Age
- Genres: Children's literature, travelogue
- Notable works: "The Little Mermaid" "The Ugly Duckling" "The Snow Queen" "The Emperor's New Clothes"
- Website: Hans Christian Andersen Centre

Hans Christian Andersen (/ˈændərsən/ AN-dər-sən; Danish: [ˈhænˀs ˈkʰʁestjæn ˈɑnɐsn̩, - ˈkʰʁæs-]; 2 April 1805 – 4 August 1875) was a Danish writer. A prolific writer of plays, travelogues, novels, and poems, he is best remembered for his literary fairy tales.

Andersen's fairy tales, consisting of 156 stories across nine volumes, have been translated into more than 125 languages. They have become embedded in Western collective consciousness, accessible to children as well as presenting lessons known for their virtue. His most famous fairy tales include "The Emperor's New Clothes", "The Little Mermaid", "The Nightingale", "The Steadfast Tin Soldier", "The Red Shoes", "The Princess and the Pea", "The Snow Queen", "The Ugly Duckling", "The Little Match Girl", and "Thumbelina." Andersen's stories have inspired ballets, plays, and animated and live-action films.

== Early life ==
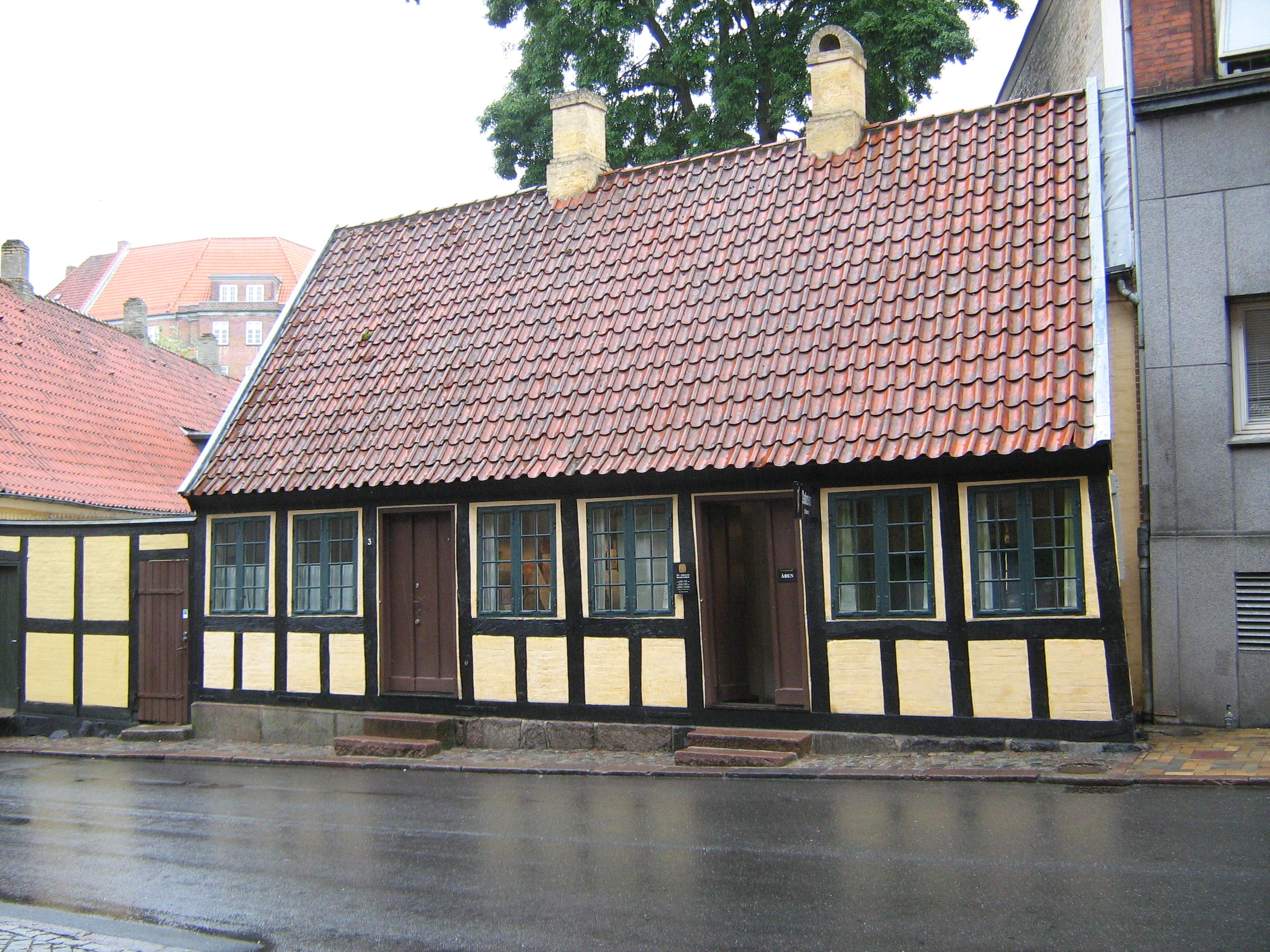
Andersen's childhood home in Odense

Andersen was born in Odense, Denmark, on 2 April 1805. He had a half sister named Karen. Andersen's father, also named Hans, considered himself related to nobility (his paternal grandmother had told his father that their family had belonged to a higher social class, but investigations have disproved these stories). Although it has been challenged, speculation suggests that Andersen was an illegitimate son of King Christian VIII. Danish historian Jens Jørgensen supported this idea in his book H.C. Andersen, en sand myte [a true myth].

Andersen was baptised on 15 April 1805 in Saint Hans Church in Odense. According to his birth certificate, which was not drafted until November 1823, six godparents were present at the baptism ceremony: Madam Sille Marie Breineberg, Maiden Friederiche Pommer, shoemaker Peder Waltersdorff, journeyman carpenter Anders Jørgensen, hospital porter Nicolas Gomard, and royal hatter Jens Henrichsen Dorch.

His father, who had received an elementary school education, introduced his son to literature, reading him Arabian Nights. His mother, Anne Marie Andersdatter, was an illiterate washerwoman. Following her husband's death in 1816, she remarried in 1818. Andersen was sent to a local school for poor children where he received a basic education and had to support himself, working as an apprentice to a weaver and, later, to a tailor. At 14, Andersen moved to Copenhagen to seek employment as an actor. Having a good soprano voice, he was accepted into the Royal Danish Theatre, but his voice soon changed. A colleague at the theatre told Andersen that he considered him a poet, and taking the suggestion seriously, Andersen began to focus on writing.

Jonas Collin, director of the Royal Danish Theatre, held great affection for Andersen and sent him to a grammar school in Slagelse, persuading King Frederick VI to pay part of Andersen's education. Andersen had by then published his first story, "The Ghost at Palnatoke's Grave" (1822). Though not a stellar pupil, Andersen also attended school at Elsinore until 1827.

Andersen later said that his years at this school were the darkest and most bitter years of his life. At one school, Andersen lived at his schoolmaster's home. There, Andersen was abused and was told that it was done in order "to improve his character." Andersen later said that the faculty had discouraged him from writing, which resulted in a depression.

== Career ==
=== Early work ===
It doesn't matter about being born in a duckyard, as long as you are hatched from a swan's egg.

— "The Ugly Duckling"

A very early fairy tale by Andersen "The Tallow Candle" (Danish: Tællelyset), was discovered in a Danish archive in October 2012. The story, written in the 1820s, is about a candle that does not feel appreciated. It was written while Andersen was still in school and dedicated to one of his benefactors. The story remained in that family's possession until it was found among other family papers in a local archive.

In 1829, Andersen enjoyed considerable success with the short story "A Journey on Foot from Holmen's Canal to the East Point of Amager." Its protagonist meets characters ranging from Saint Peter to a talking cat. Andersen followed this success with a theatrical piece, Love on St. Nicholas Church Tower, and a short volume of poems. He made little progress in writing and publishing immediately following these poems, but did receive a small travel grant from the king in 1833. This enabled Andersen to set out on the first of many journeys throughout Europe. At Jura, near Le Locle, Switzerland, Andersen wrote the story "Agnete and the Merman." The same year, he spent an evening in the Italian seaside village of Sestri Levante, which inspired the title of "The Bay of Fables." Andersen arrived in Rome in October 1834. His travels in Italy were reflected in his first novel, a fictionalized autobiography titled The Improvisatore (Improvisatoren), published in 1835 to instant acclaim.

=== Attempts for Literary fairy tales ===
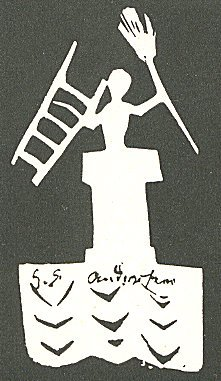
A paper chimney sweep cut by Andersen

Fairy Tales Told for Children. First Collection (Danish: Eventyr, fortalt for Børn. Første Samling.) is a collection of nine fairy tales by Andersen. The tales were published in a series of three installments by C. A. Reitzel in Copenhagen between May 1835 and April 1837. They were Andersen's first venture into the fairy tale genre.

The first installment was a volume of sixty-one unbound pages published 8 May 1835 containing "The Tinderbox", "Little Claus and Big Claus", "The Princess and the Pea" and "Little Ida's Flowers". The first three tales were based on folktales Andersen had heard in his childhood. The fourth was Andersen's creation for Ida Thiele, the daughter of folklorist Just Mathias Thiele, Andersen's early benefactor. Reitzel paid Andersen thirty rigsdalers for the manuscript, and the booklet was priced at 24 shillings.

The second booklet was published on 16 December 1835 and contained "The Naughty Boy", and "The Traveling Companion", and "Thumbelina." The lattermost was inspired by "Tom Thumb" and other stories of miniature people. "The Naughty Boy" was based on a poem about Eros from the Anacreontea, and "The Traveling Companion" was a ghost story Andersen had experimented with in the year 1830.

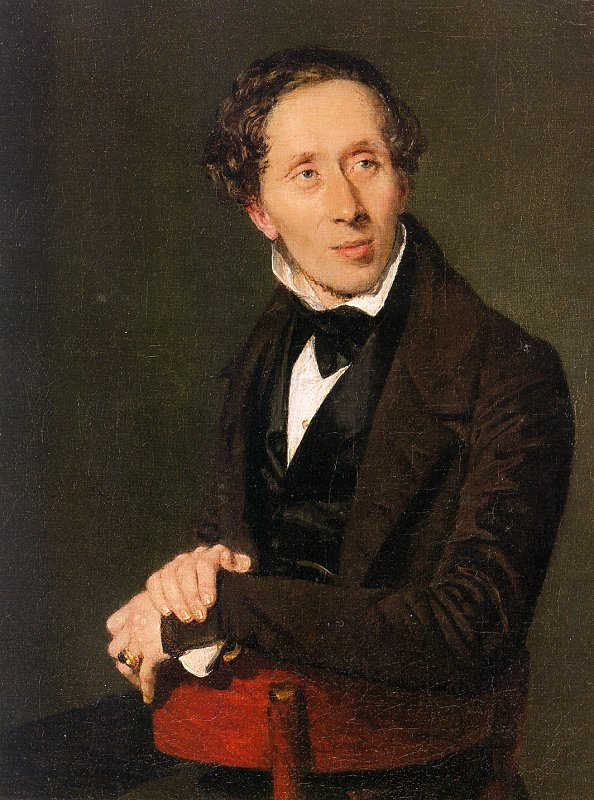
Andersen in 1836

The third booklet contained "The Little Mermaid" and "The Emperor's New Clothes", and it was published on 7 April 1837. The former was influenced by Friedrich de la Motte Fouqué's Undine (1811) and legends about mermaids. This tale established Andersen's international reputation. The only other tale in the third booklet was "The Emperor's New Clothes", which was based on a medieval Spanish story with Arab and Jewish origins. On the eve of the third installment's publication, Andersen revised the conclusion (in which the Emperor simply walks in procession) to its now-famous finale of a child calling out, "The Emperor is not wearing any clothes!"

In the 1840s, Andersen's attention returned to the theatre stage, but with little success. He had better luck with the publication of the Picture-Book without Pictures (1840). Andersen started a second series of fairy tales in 1838 and a third series in 1845. At this point, he was celebrated throughout Europe, although Andersen's native Denmark still showed some resistance to his pretensions.

Danish reviews of the first two booklets first appeared in 1836 and were not enthusiastic. The critics disliked the chatty, informal style and apparent immorality, since children's literature was meant to educate rather than to amuse. The critics discouraged Andersen from pursuing this type of style. Andersen believed that he was working against the critics' preconceived notions about fairy tales, and he temporarily returned to novel-writing, waiting a full year before publishing his third installment.

In 1837, The nine tales from the three booklets were published in one volume and sold for seventy-two shillings. A title page, a table of contents, and a preface by Andersen were published in this volume.

In 1868, Horace Scudder, the editor of Riverside Magazine For Young People, offered Andersen $500 for 12 new stories. Sixteen of Andersen's stories were published in the magazine, and 10 of them appeared there before they were printed in Denmark.

=== Travelogues ===
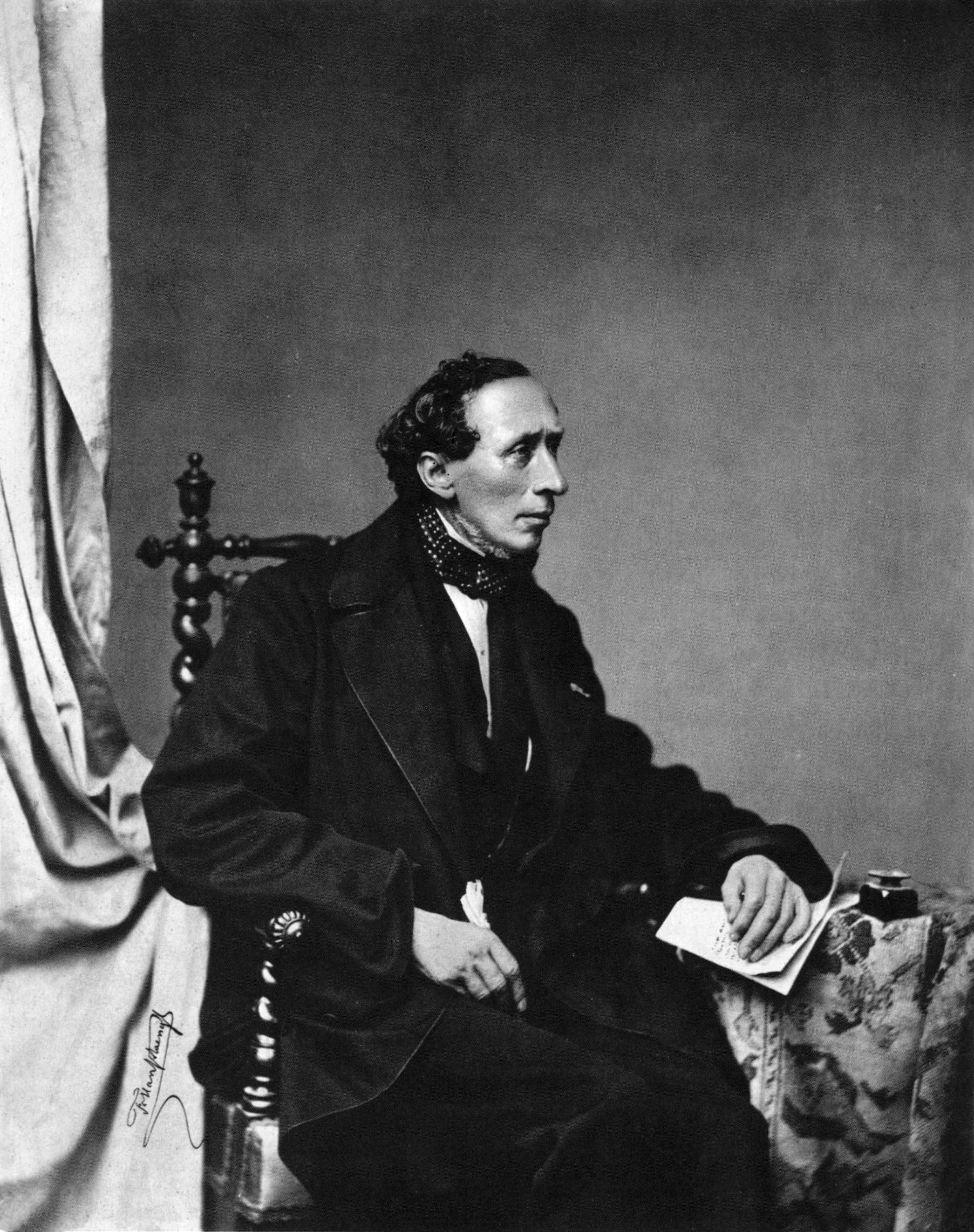
Portrait of Andersen by Franz Hanfstaengl, dated July 1860

In 1851, Andersen published In Sweden, a volume of travel sketches. The publication received wide acclaim. A keen traveler, he published several other long travelogues: Shadow Pictures of a Journey to the Harz, Swiss Saxony, etc. etc. in the Summer of 1831, A Poet's Bazaar, In Spain, and A Visit to Portugal in 1866. (The last one describes his visit with his Portuguese friends Jorge and José O'Neill, whom Andersen knew in the mid-1820s while he was living in Copenhagen.) In his travelogues, Andersen used contemporary conventions related to travel writing but developed the style to make it his own. Each of Andersen's travelogues combines documentary and descriptive accounts of his experiences, adding additional philosophical passages on topics such as authorship, immortality, and fiction in literary travel reports. Some of the travelogues, such as In Sweden, contain fairy tales.

Between 1845 and 1864, Andersen lived at Nyhavn 67, Copenhagen, where a memorial plaque is now placed.

Patrons of Andersen's writings included the monarchy of Denmark, the House of Schleswig-Holstein-Sonderburg-Glücksburg. An unexpected invitation from King Christian IX to the royal palace entrenched Andersen's folklore in Danish royalty as well as making its way to the Romanov dynasty when Christian IX's daughter Maria Feodorovna married Alexander III of Russia.

== Personal life ==
=== Meetings with Charles Dickens ===
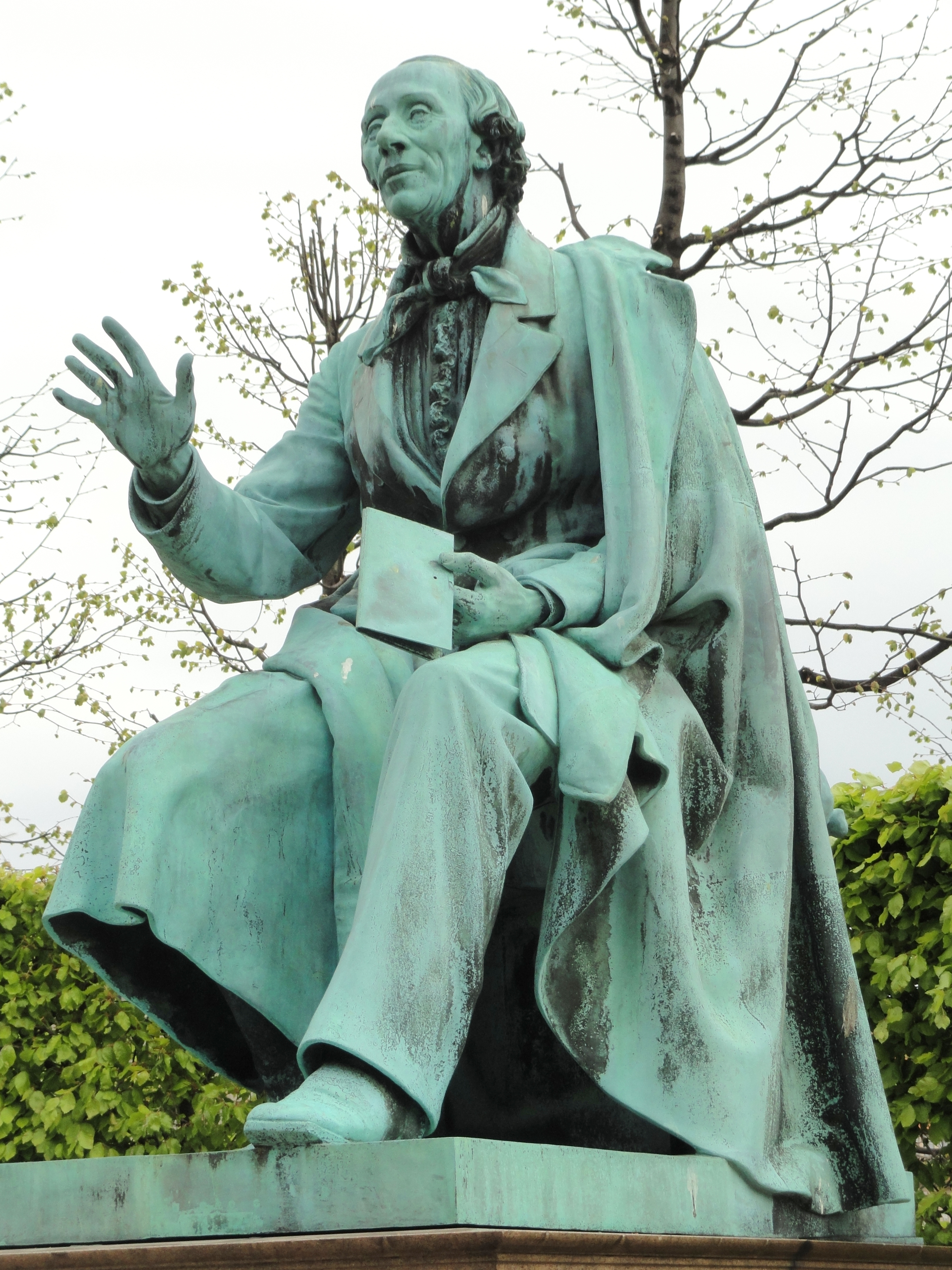
Andersen statue at the Rosenborg Castle Gardens, Copenhagen

In June 1847, Andersen visited England for the first time, enjoying triumphant social success. The Countess of Blessington invited him to her parties where many intellectuals would meet, and at one such party he met Charles Dickens for the first time. They shook hands and walked to the veranda, which Andersen noted in his diary: "We were on the veranda, and I was so happy to see and speak to England's now-living writer whom I do love the most." The two authors respected each other's work and each other as writers, and had in common their depictions of the underclass, who often led difficult lives affected both by the Industrial Revolution and by abject poverty.

In 1857, Andersen visited England again, primarily to meet Dickens. Andersen extended the planned brief visit to Dickens' home at Gads Hill Place into a five-week stay, much to the distress of Dickens' family. After Andersen was told to leave, Dickens gradually stopped all correspondence between them, to Andersen's great disappointment and confusion; he had enjoyed the visit and never understood why his letters went unanswered. It has been argued that Dickens modelled the physical appearance and mannerisms of Uriah Heep from David Copperfield after Andersen.

=== Romantic relationships ===
In Andersen's early life, his private journal records his refusal to have sexual relations.

Andersen experienced homosexual attraction; he wrote to Edvard Collin: "I languish for you as for a pretty Calabrian wench ... my sentiments for you are those of a woman. The femininity of my nature and our friendship must remain a mystery." Collin wrote in his own memoir, "I found myself unable to respond to this love, and this caused the author much suffering." Andersen's infatuation with Karl Alexander, the young hereditary duke of Saxe-Weimar-Eisenach, did result in a relationship:

The Hereditary Grand Duke walked arm in arm with me across the courtyard of the castle to my room, kissed me lovingly, asked me always to love him though he was just an ordinary person, asked me to stay with him this winter ... Fell asleep with the melancholy, happy feeling that I was the guest of this strange prince at his castle and loved by him ... It is like a fairy tale.

There is a sharp division in opinion over Andersen's physical fulfillment in the sexual sphere. Jackie Wullschlager's biography maintains he was possibly lovers with Danish dancer Harald Scharff and Andersen's "The Snowman" was inspired by their relationship. Scharff first met Andersen when the latter was in his 50s. Andersen was infatuated and Wullschlager sees his journals as implying that their relationship was sexual. Scharff had various dinners alone with Andersen and gifted a silver toothbrush to Andersen on his 57th birthday. Wullschlager asserts that in the winter of 1861–62, the two men entered an affair that brought Andersen "joy, some kind of sexual fulfillment, and a temporary end to loneliness". He was not discreet in his conduct with Scharff, and displayed his feelings openly. Onlookers regarded the relationship as improper and ridiculous. In his diary in March 1862, Andersen referred to this time in his life as his "erotic period." On 13 November 1863, Andersen wrote, "Scharff has not visited me in eight days; with him it is over". He took this calmly and the two thereafter met in overlapping social circles without bitterness, though Andersen attempted to rekindle their relationship many times without success. (Note: While on holiday, for example, Andersen and Scharff were forced to spend the night in Helsingør. Andersen reserved a double room for them both but Scharff insisted upon having his own.) (Note: Andersen continued to follow Scharff's career with interest, but in 1871, an injury during rehearsal forced Scharff permanently from the ballet stage. Scharff tried acting without success, married a ballerina in 1874, and died in the St. Hans asylum in 1912.) According to Wullschlager, "Andersen's diaries leave no doubt that he was attracted to both sexes; that at times he longed for a physical relationship with a woman and that at other times he was involved in physical liaisons with men". For example, Wullschlager quotes from Andersen's diaries:

"Scharff bounded up to me; threw himself round my neck and kissed me! .... Nervous in the evening" Five days later he received "a visit from Scharff, who was very intimate and nice". In the following weeks, there was "dinner at Scharff's, who was ardent and loving"

The claim that Andersen entertained "physical liaisons" with men has been contested by Klara Bom and Anya Aarenstrup from the H. C. Andersen Centre of University of Southern Denmark. They state:

it is correct to point to the very ambivalent (and also very traumatic) elements in Andersen's emotional life concerning the sexual sphere, but it is decidedly just as wrong to describe him as homosexual and maintain that he had physical relationships with men. He did not. Indeed, that would have been entirely contrary to his moral and religious ideas, aspects that are quite outside the field of vision of Wullschlager and her like.

Wullschlager, in fact, argued that, because of moral and religious ideas of his time, Andersen could not be open about his homosexual relationships.

Andersen also fell in love with unattainable women, and many interpret references to them in his stories. At one point, Andersen wrote in his diary: "Almighty God, thee only have I; thou steerest my fate, I must give myself up to thee! Give me a livelihood! Give me a bride! My blood wants love, as my heart does!" A girl named Riborg Voigt was the unrequited love of Andersen's youth. A small pouch containing a long letter from Voigt was found on Andersen's chest when he died, several decades after Andersen first fell in love with her. Other disappointments in love included Sophie Ørsted, the daughter of the physicist Hans Christian Ørsted; and Louise Collin, the youngest daughter of his benefactor Jonas Collin. One of Andersen's stories, "The Nightingale", was written as an expression of his passion for Jenny Lind and was the inspiration for her nickname, the "Swedish Nightingale." Andersen was shy around women and had extreme difficulty proposing to Lind. When Lind was boarding a train to go to an opera concert, Andersen gave Lind a letter of proposal. Her feelings towards him were not the same; she saw Andersen as a brother, writing to him in 1844: "farewell ... God bless and protect my brother is the sincere wish of his affectionate sister, Jenny." It is suggested that Andersen expressed his disappointment by portraying Lind as the eponymous antihero of "The Snow Queen."

== Death ==
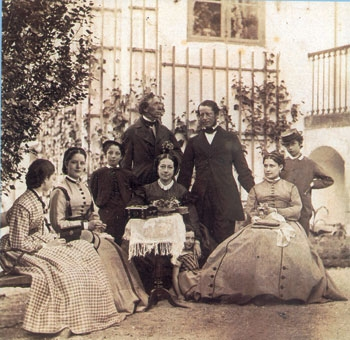
Andersen at Rolighed: Israel Melchior (c. 1867)

In early 1872, at the age of 67, Andersen fell out of his bed and was severely hurt; he never fully recovered from the resultant injuries. Soon afterward, he started to show signs of liver cancer.

He died on 4 August 1875 at the age of 70 in a country house called Rolighed (literally: calmness) near Copenhagen, the home of his close friends, the banker Moritz G. Melchior and his wife. Shortly before his death, he consulted a composer about the music for his funeral, saying: "Most of the people who will walk after me will be children, so make the beat keep time with little steps."

His body was interred in the Assistens Kirkegård in the Nørrebro area of Copenhagen, in the Collin family plot. In 1914, the headstone was moved to another cemetery (today known as "Frederiksbergs ældre kirkegaard"), where younger Collin family members were buried. For a period, his, Edvard Collin's, and Henriette Collin's graves were unmarked. A second stone has been erected, marking Andersen's grave, now without any mention of the Collin couple, but all three still share the same plot.

At the time of his death, Andersen was internationally revered, and the Danish government paid him an annual stipend for being a "national treasure."

== Legacy ==
=== Archives, collections and museums ===
- The Hans Christian Andersen Museum or H.C. Andersens Hus, is a set of museums/buildings dedicated to Hans Christian Andersen in Odense, Denmark, some of which, at various times in history, have functioned as the main Odense-based museum for the author.
- The Hans Christian Andersen Museum in Solvang, California, a city founded by Danes, is devoted to presenting the author's life and works. Displays include models of Andersen's childhood home and of "The Princess and the Pea". The museum also contains hundreds of volumes of Andersen's works, including many illustrated first editions and correspondence with Danish composer Asger Hamerik.
- The Library of Congress Rare Book and Special Collections Division was bequeathed an extensive collection of Andersen materials by the Danish-American actor Jean Hersholt.

=== Arts and entertainment ===
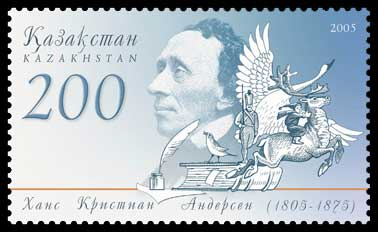
Postage stamp, Kazakhstan, 2005

==== Film and television ====
- La petite marchande d'allumettes (1928; in English: The Little Match Girl), film by Jean Renoir, based on "The Little Match Girl".
- The Ugly Duckling (1931) and its 1939 remake of the same name, two animated Silly Symphonies cartoon shorts produced by Walt Disney Productions, based on The Ugly Duckling.
- Andersen was played by Joachim Gottschalk in the German film The Swedish Nightingale (1941), which portrays his relationship with the singer Jenny Lind.
- The Red Shoes (1948), British drama film written, directed, and produced by Michael Powell and Emeric Pressburger, based on "The Red Shoes".
- Hans Christian Andersen (1952), an American musical film starring Danny Kaye that, though inspired by Andersen's life and literary legacy, was not meant to be historically nor biographically accurate; it begins by saying, "This is not the story of his life, but a fairy tale about this great spinner of fairy tales."
- "The Second Day of Christmas", 26 December 1955 episode of Robert Montgomery Presents, Danish-born writer Sandra Michael's dramatization of Andersen's relationship with Jenny Lind, starring Lois Smith and Frank Schofield
- The Snow Queen (1957), a Soviet animated film based on The Snow Queen, by Lev Atmanov of Soyuzmultfilm, a faithful depiction of the fairy tale that garnered critical acclaim.
- The Emperor's New Clothes (Carevo novo ruho), a 1961 Croatian film, directed by Ante Babaja.
- The Wild Swans (1962), Soviet animated adaptation of The Wild Swans, by Soyuzmultfilm.
- The Rankin/Bass Productions-produced fantasy film, The Daydreamer (1966), depicts the young Hans Christian Andersen conceiving the stories he would later write.
- The Little Mermaid (1968) 30-minute faithful Soviet animated adaptation of The Little Mermaid by Soyuzmultfilm.
- The World of Hans Christian Andersen (1968), a Japanese animated fantasy film from Toei Doga, based on the works of Hans Christian Andersen.
- Andersen Monogatari (1971), a Japanese animated anthology series produced by Mushi Production.
- The Pine Tree (c. 1974), 23 minute film in colour, commentary by Liz Lochhead.
- Hans Christian Andersen's The Little Mermaid (1975) Japanese animated film from Toei, faithfully based on The Little Mermaid.
- The Little Mermaid (1976) Czech fantasy film based on The Little Mermaid.
- The Wild Swans (1977), Japanese animated adaptation of The Wild Swans by Toei.
- Thumbelina (1978), Japanese animated film from Toei based on Thumbelina.
- Faerie Tale Theatre (1982–1987), an American television series, featured several Andersen stories; "The Emperor's New Clothes", "The Nightingale", "The Snow Queen" and "Thumbelina" were collected and released on DVD as Faerie Tale Theatre: Tales From Hans Christian Andersen (2009).
- In 1986, Kievnauchfilm produced an animated adaptation of The Girl who Trod on the Loaf. It was released in both Russian and Ukrainian, both voiced by the same actors.
- The Little Mermaid (1989), an animated film based on The Little Mermaid, created and produced at Walt Disney Feature Animation in Burbank, California.
- Thumbelina (1994), an animated film based on "Thumbelina", created and produced by Sullivan Bluth Studios, Dublin, Ireland
- One segment in Fantasia 2000 is based on "The Steadfast Tin Soldier", alongside Shostakovich's Piano Concerto No. 2, Movement 1: "Allegro".
- Hans Christian Andersen: My Life as a Fairytale (2003), a British made-for-television film directed by Philip Saville, a fictionalized account of Andersen's early successes, with his fairy stories intertwined with events in his own life.
- The Fairytaler (2003), Danish-British animated series based on several Andersen fairy tales.
- The Little Matchgirl (2006), an animated short film by the Walt Disney Animation Studios directed by Roger Allers and produced by Don Hahn.
- The Snow Queen (2012), a Russian 3D animated film based on The Snow Queen, the first film of The Snow Queen series produced by Wizart Animation.
- Frozen (2013), a 3D computer-animated musical film produced by Walt Disney Animation Studios that is loosely inspired by The Snow Queen.
- Ginger's Tale (2020), a Russian 2D animated film loosely based on The Tinderbox, produced at Vverh Animation Studio in Moscow.
- The Little Mermaid (2023), a live-action film based on The Little Mermaid, created and produced by Walt Disney Pictures.
- Goodbye Lara (2026), Japanese animated series

==== Literature ====
Andersen's stories laid the groundwork for other children's classics, such as The Wind in the Willows (1908) by Kenneth Grahame and Winnie-the-Pooh (1926) by A. A. Milne. The trope of inanimate objects, such as toys, coming to life (as in "Little Ida's Flowers") would later also be used by Lewis Carroll and Beatrix Potter.

==== Music ====
- Hans Christian Andersen (album), a 1994 album by Franciscus Henri.
- The Song is a Fairytale (Sangen er et Eventyr), a song cycle based on fairy tales by Hans Christian Andersen, composed by Frederik Magle.
- "Atonal Fairy Tale", track with music composed by Gregory Reid Davis Jr. and Smart Dad Living reading the fairy tale "The Elfin Mound" by Hans Christian Andersen.

==== Stage productions ====
For opera and ballet see List of The Little Mermaid Adaptations

- Little Hans Andersen (1903), a children's pantomime at the Adelphi Theatre.
- The Nightingale (1914), an opera by Igor Stravinsky.
- Sam the Lovesick Snowman at the Center for Puppetry Arts, a contemporary puppet show by Jon Ludwig inspired by "The Snow Man".
- Striking Twelve, a modern musical take on "The Little Match Girl", created and performed by GrooveLily.
- The Red Shoes, a 1993 musical with a book by Marsha Norman, lyrics by Norman and Bob Merrill and music by Jule Styne.
- Once Upon a Mattress, a musical comedy based on Andersen's work "The Princess and the Pea".

=== Awards ===
- Hans Christian Andersen Awards, prizes awarded annually by the International Board on Books for Young People to an author and illustrator whose complete works have made lasting contributions to children's literature.
- Hans Christian Andersen Literature Award, a Danish literary award established in 2010.
- Andersen's fable "The Emperor's New Clothes" was inducted in 2000 into the Prometheus Hall of Fame for Best Classic Fiction.

=== Events and holidays ===
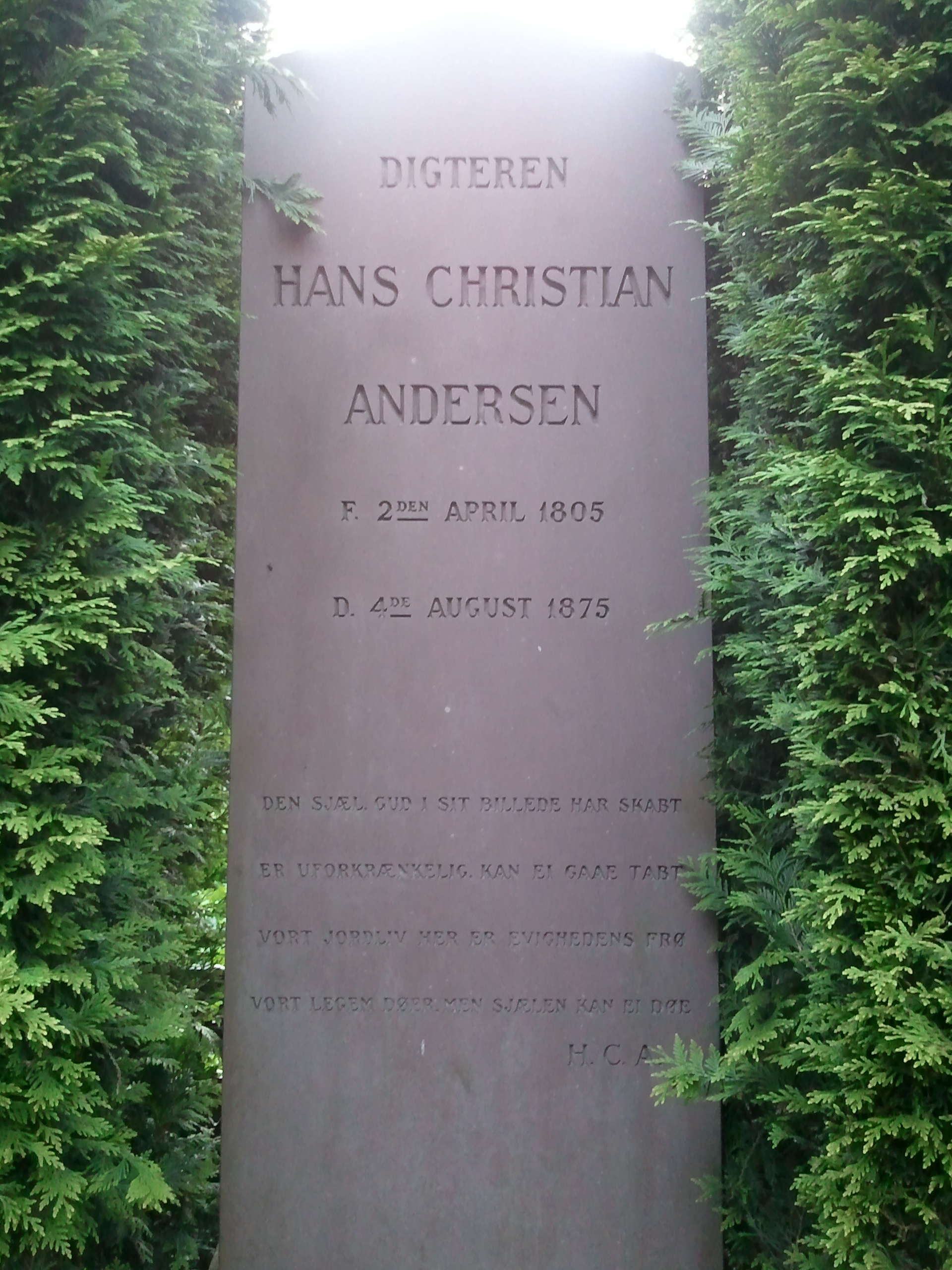
Andersen's refreshed gravestone at Assistens Cemetery in the Nørrebro district, Copenhagen

- Andersen's birthday, 2 April, is celebrated as International Children's Book Day.
- The year 2005, designated "Andersen Year" in Denmark, was the bicentenary of Andersen's birth, and his life and work were celebrated around the world.
- In Denmark, a well-attended show was staged in Copenhagen's Parken Stadium during "Andersen Year" to celebrate the writer and his stories.
- The annual H.C. Andersen Marathon, established in 2000, is held in Odense, Denmark.

=== Monuments and sculptures ===
- Seated bronze (1880) by sculptor August Saabye (1823–1916) can be seen in the Rosenborg Castle Gardens, Copenhagen, Denmark.
- Seated bronze (1896) with a swan beside, a statue by the Danish sculptor Johannes Gelert (1852–1923), at Lincoln Park, Stockton Drive near Webster Avenue, Chicago, United States.
- Seated bronze (1956), a statue by sculptor Georg J. Lober (1891–1961) and designer Otto Frederick Langman, at Central Park Lake in New York City, opposite East 74th Street (GPS 40.7744306°N 73.9677972°W). The seated bronze of Andersen upon a granite bench was erected on the author's 150th birthday. It includes a bronze duck representing the book The Ugly Duckling.
- Seated bronze (1965) was erected in Copenhagen City Hall Square (Rådhuspladsen), facing H. C. Andersens Boulevard, Copenhagen, Denmark, made by Henry Luckow-Nielsen.
- Bronze bust (2004), a replica of the 1865 bust by Herman Wilhelm Bissen (1798–1868), at Observatory Hill, Millers Point, Sydney, Australia, was officially unveiled by HRH Crown Prince Frederik and HRH Crown Princess Mary of Denmark in March 2005, on Andersen's bicentenary. It was to replace the 1955 bust erected in Phillip Park, Sydney; although found missing by 1984.
- Seated bronze (2005), in the Plaza de la Marina in Málaga, Spain, by José María Córdoba.
- Standing bronze (2005) was erected in Hviezdoslavovo námestie, Bratislava, Slovakia, and was designed by Tibor Bártfay to mark the bicentennial.
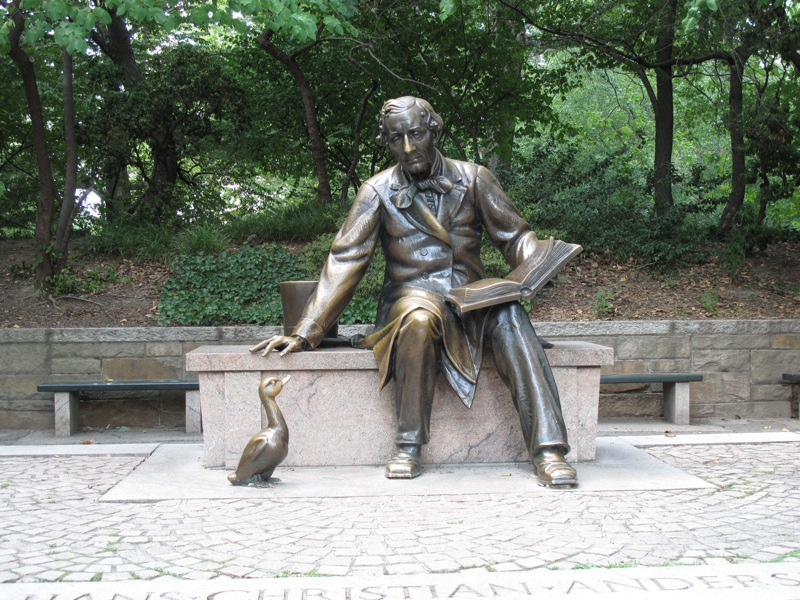
Statue in Central Park, New York commemorating Andersen and The Ugly Duckling

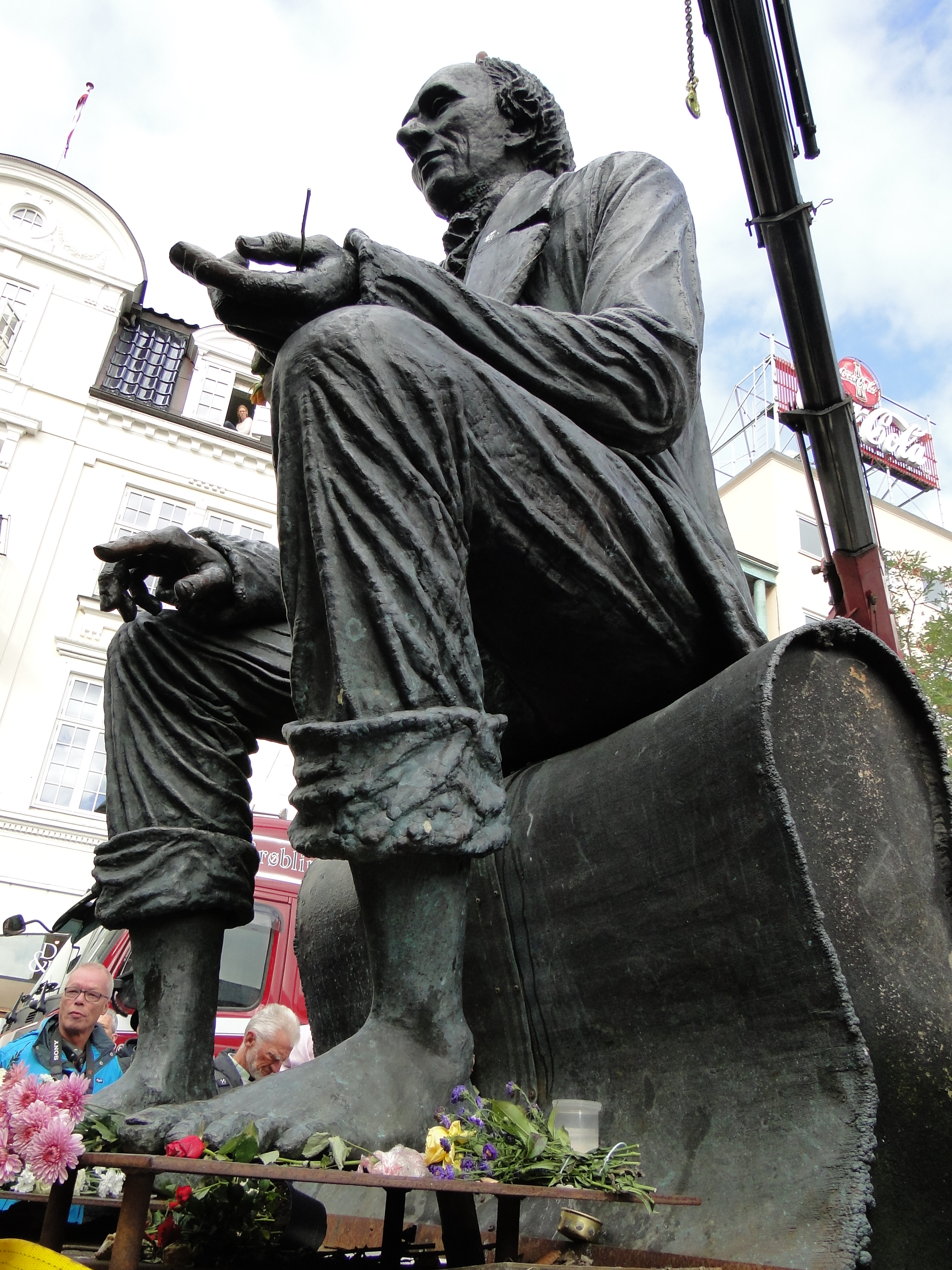
Statue in Odense being led out to the harbour during a public exhibition

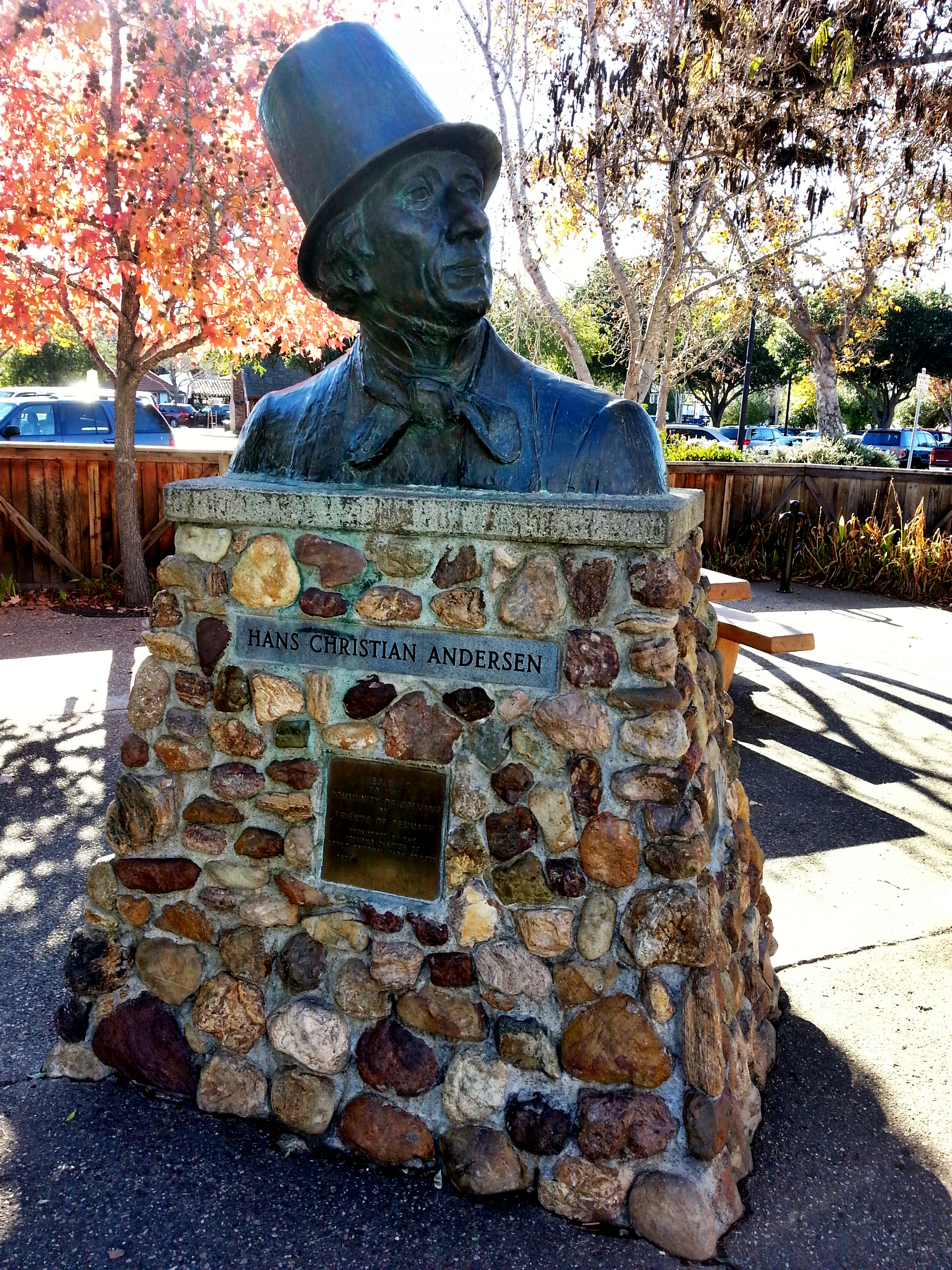
Statue in Solvang, California, a city built by Danish immigrants

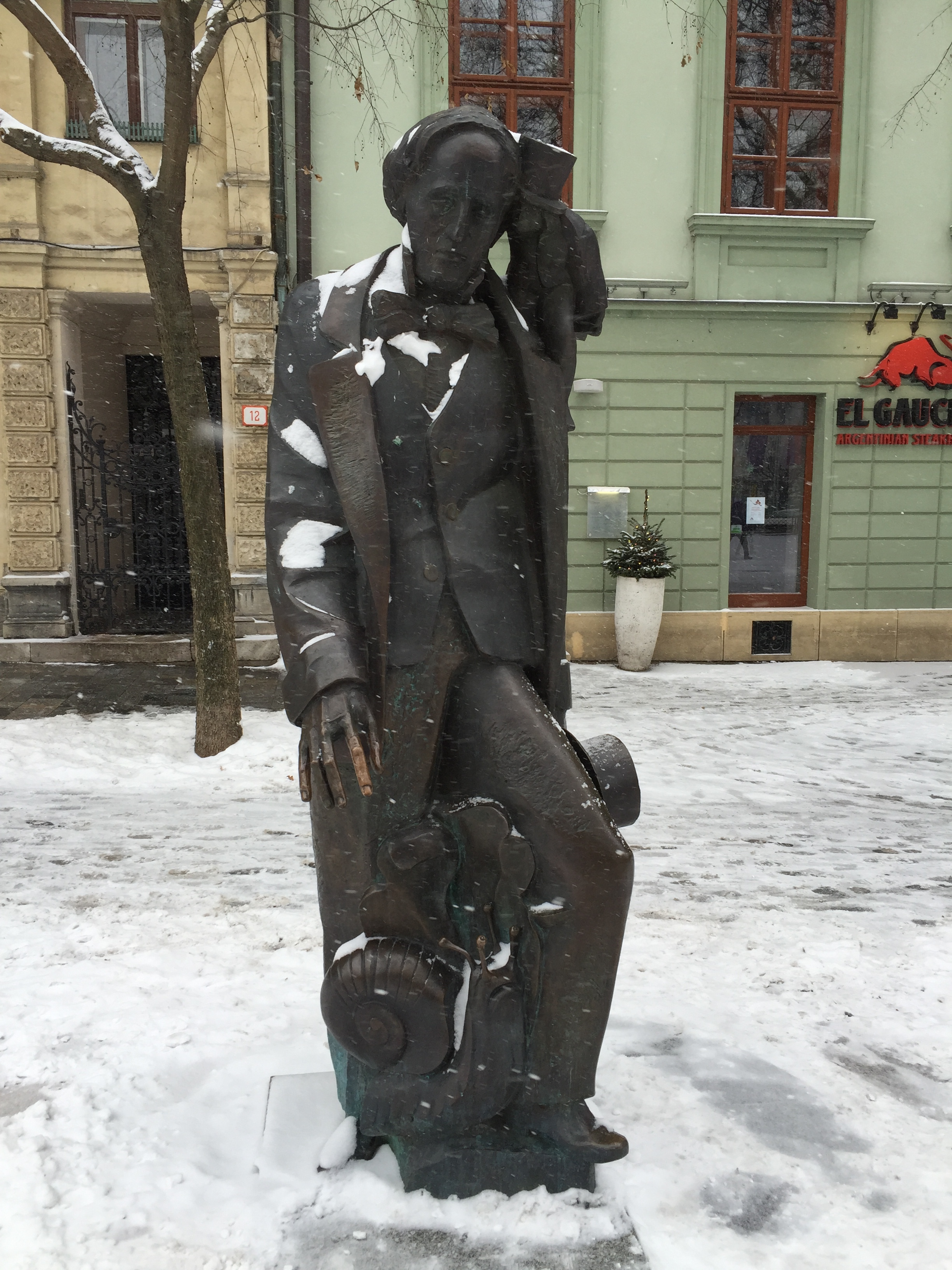
Statue in Bratislava, Slovakia

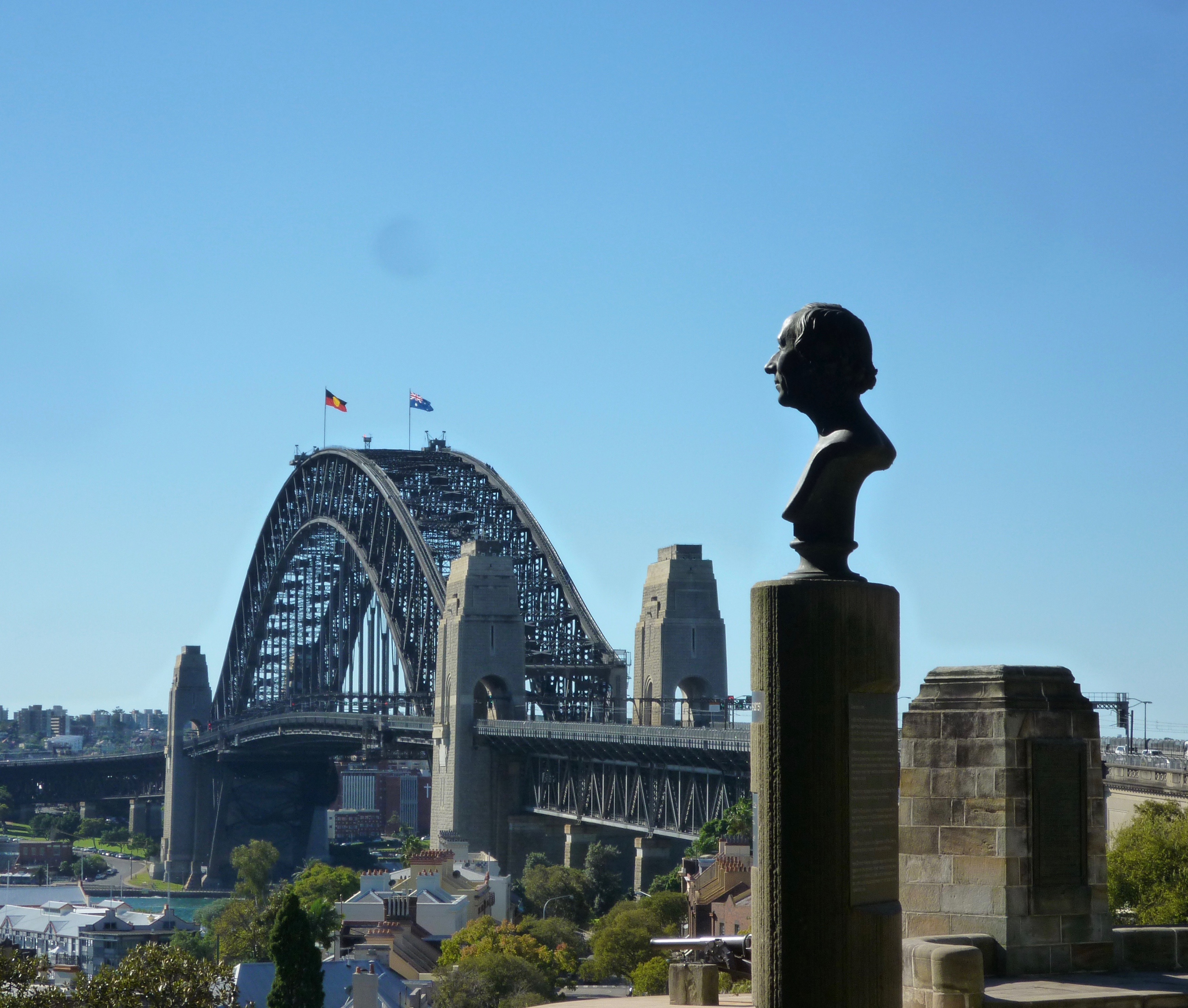
Portrait bust in Sydney unveiled by the Crown Prince and Princess of Denmark in 2005

=== Places named after Andersen ===
- H. C. Andersens Boulevard, a major road in Copenhagen formerly known as Vestre Boulevard (Western Boulevard), received its current name in 1955 to mark the 150-year anniversary of the writer's birth.
- Hans Christian Andersen Airport, a small airport servicing the Danish city of Odense.
- Instituto Hans Christian Andersen, a Chilean high school located in San Fernando, Colchagua Province, Chile.
- Hans Christian Andersen Park, Solvang, California.
- CEIP Hans Christian Andersen, a primary Education School in Malaga, Spain.

=== Theme parks ===
- In Japan, the city of Funabashi has a children's theme park named after Andersen. Funabashi is a sister city to Odense, the city of Andersen's birth.
- In China, a US$32 million theme park based on Andersen's tales and life opened in Shanghai's Yangpu district in 2017. Construction on the project began in 2005.

=== Other honours ===
- The flatworm Collastoma anderseni (family: Umagillidae), an endosymbiont from the intestine of the sipunculan Themiste lageniformis (lit. 'Formed like a Lagenum'), was named after Andersen.

== Works ==
Andersen's fairy tales include:

- "The Angel" (1843)
- "The Bell" (1845)
- "Blockhead Hans" (1855)
- "The Elf Mound" (1845)
- "The Emperor's New Clothes" (1837)
- "The Fir-Tree" (1844)
- "The Flying Trunk" (1839)
- "The Galoshes of Fortune" (1838)
- "The Garden of Paradise" (1839)
- "The Goblin and the Grocer" (1852)
- "Golden Treasure" (1865)
- "The Happy Family" (1847)
- "The Ice-Maiden" (1861)
- "It's Quite True" (1852)
- "The Jumpers" (1845)
- "Little Claus and Big Claus" (1835)
- "Little Ida's Flowers" (1835)
- "The Little Match Girl" (1845)
- "The Little Mermaid" (1837)
- "Little Tuk" (1847)
- "The Most Incredible Thing" (1870)
- "The Naughty Boy" (1835)
- "The Nightingale" (1843)
- "The Old House" (1847)
- "Ole Lukoie" (1841)
- "The Philosopher's Stone" (1858)
- "The Princess and the Pea" (1835)
- "The Red Shoes" (1845)
- "The Rose Elf" (1839)
- "The Shadow" (1847)
- "The Shepherdess and the Chimney Sweep" (1845)
- "The Snow Queen" (1844)
- "The Snowman" (1861)
- "The Steadfast Tin Soldier" (1838)
- "The Storks" (1839)
- "The Story of a Mother" (1847)
- "The Sweethearts; or, The Top and the Ball" (1843)
- "The Swineherd" (1841)
- "The Tallow Candle" (1820s)
- "The Teapot" (1863)
- "Thumbelina" (1835)
- "The Tinderbox" (1835)
- "The Traveling Companion" (1835)
- "The Ugly Duckling" (1843)
- "What the Old Man Does is Always Right" (1861)
- "The Wicked Prince" (1840)
- "The Wild Swans" (1838)

The Hans Christian Andersen Museum in Odense has a large digital collection of Hans Christian Andersen papercuts, drawings, and portraits.

== See also ==
- Brothers Grimm
- Kjøbenhavnsposten, a Danish newspaper in which Andersen published one of his first poems
- Pleated Christmas hearts, invented by Andersen
- Vilhelm Pedersen, the first illustrator of Andersen's fairy tales
- Vasili Eroshenko

== General bibliography ==
- Andersen, Hans Christian (2005a) [2004]. Wullschläger, Jackie (ed.). Fairy Tales. Tiina Nunnally. New York: Viking. ISBN 0-670-03377-4.
- Andersen, Jens (2005) [2003]. Hans Christian Andersen: A New Life (Illustrated ed.). New York, Woodstock, and London: Duckworth Overlook. ISBN 978-0-71563-361-8.
- Binding, Paul (2014). Hans Christian Andersen : European witness. Yale University Press.
- Bredsdorff, Elias (1975). Hans Christian Andersen: the story of his life and work 1805–75. Phaidon. p. 168. ISBN 0-7148-1636-1.
- Stig Dalager, Journey in Blue, historical, biographical novel about H.C. Andersen, London: Peter Owen, 2006; Toronto: McArthur & Co., 2006.
- Frank, Diane Crone; Frank, Jeffrey (2004) [2003], The Stories of Hans Christian Andersen, London: Granta Books, ISBN 978-1-86207-712-6
- Gosse, Edmund William (1911). "Andersen, Hans Christian" . Encyclopædia Britannica. Vol. 1 (11th ed.). pp. 958–959.
- Jørgensen, Jens (1987). H.C. Andersen: en sand myte (in Danish) (2nd ed.). Hovedland. ISBN 978-87-7739-017-3.
- Roes, André, Kierkegaard en Andersen, Uitgeverij Aspekt, Soesterberg (2017) ISBN 978-94-6338-215-1
- Ruth Manning-Sanders, Swan of Denmark: The Story of Hans Christian Andersen, Heinemann, 1949
- Rossel, Sven Hakon (1996). Hans Christian Andersen: Danish Writer and Citizen of the World. Rodopi. ISBN 90-5183-944-8.
- Stirling, Monica (1965). The Wild Swan: The Life and Times of Hans Christian Andersen. New York: Harcourt, Brace & World, Inc.
- Terry, Walter (1979). The King's Ballet Master. New York: Dodd, Mead & Company. ISBN 0-396-07722-6.
- Wullschläger, Jackie (2000). Hans Christian Andersen: The Life of a Storyteller. London: Allen Lane. ISBN 0-713-99325-1.
- Zipes, Jack (2005). Hans Christian Andersen: The Misunderstood Storyteller. New York and London: Routledge. ISBN 0-415-97433-X.
