= Horace Scudder =

American writer (1838–1902)

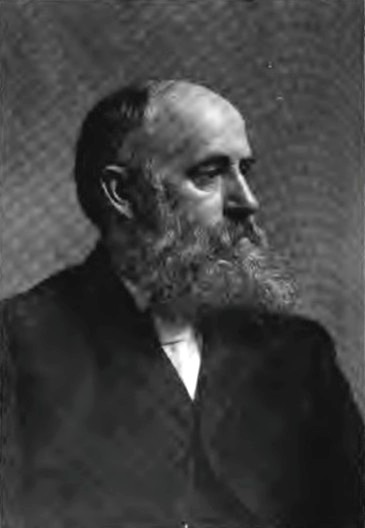
- Born: October 16, 1838
- Died: January 11, 1902 (aged 63)

Signature
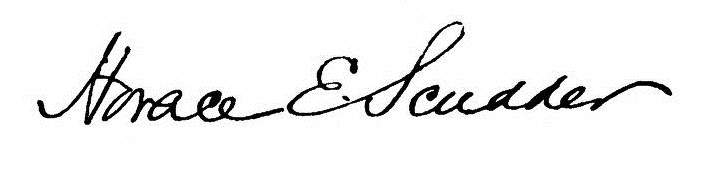

Horace Elisha Scudder (October 16, 1838 – January 11, 1902) was an American man of letters and editor.

== Biography ==
He was born into a Boston family as the youngest of seven siblings—six brothers and one sister. His siblings included David Coit Scudder and Samuel Hubbard Scudder, and his niece was scholar and reformer Vida Dutton Scudder. He graduated from Boston Latin School alongside Henry Adams in 1854. His Congregationalist family made him attend Williams College due to its conservative orthodox religious values, though Scudder became more interested in studying literature rather than religion. After his graduation in 1858, he taught school in New York City, and subsequently, returned to Boston and devoted himself to literary work.

He is best known for his children's books. He published the Bodley Books (1875–87) and was also an essayist, and produced large quantities of journalism that was printed anonymously. He was a correspondent of Hans Christian Andersen and biographer of James Russell Lowell. He edited Riverside Magazine For Young People (1867 to 1870), where several Andersen fairy tales were published for the first time.

Scudder also prepared, with Mrs. Taylor, the Life and Letters of Bayard Taylor (1884) and was series editor for the extensive "American Commonwealths Series" as well as the "Riverside Literature Series" for Houghton Mifflin, where he also worked as literary advisor for several years.

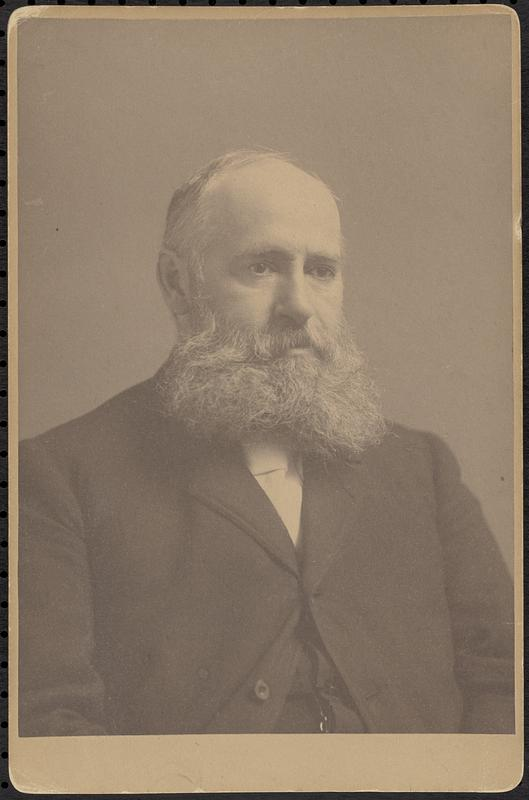
H. E. Scudder, ca. 1885–1894; from the Cabinet Card Collection of the Boston Public Library

Scudder may have been most famous for his 1884 work A History of the United States of America Preceded By a Narrative of the Discovery and Settlement of North America and of the Events Which Led to the Independence of the Thirteen English Colonies for the Use of Schools and Academies, which long set the standard for American history textbooks.

Scudder served as editor of the prestigious The Atlantic Monthly from 1890 to 1898. Only a couple months into his role as editor, on August 28, 1890, Scudder received from William Dean Howells a submission written by Charlotte Perkins Gilman. He quickly rejected the story, later published as "The Yellow Wallpaper", telling Gilman, "I could not forgive myself if I made others as miserable as I have made myself!" His predecessor, Thomas Bailey Aldrich, was not impressed by Scudder's tenure and joked with the pun that Horace Scudder was greater than Moses because "Moses dried up the Red Sea once only; Scudder dries up The Atlantic monthly."

Scudder died in 1902. The pallbearers at his funeral included Thomas Wentworth Higginson and James Bradley Thayer. His cremated remains were buried at Mount Auburn Cemetery.

== Works ==
- Seven Little People and Their Friends (1862)
- Life and Letters of David Coit Scudder (1864)
- Dream Children (1864)
- Stories from my Attic (1869)
- Stories and Romances (1880)
- Boston Town (1881)
- Noah Webster ("American Men of Letters," 1882)
- A History of the United States of America Preceded By a Narrative of the Discovery and Settlement of North America and of the Events Which Led to the Independence of the Thirteen English Colonies for the Use of Schools and Academies (1884 and later editions)
- History of the United States (1884)
- Men and Letters (1887), essays
- George Washington (1889)
- Childhood in Literature and Art (1894)
- Life of James Russell Lowell (1901)
- The Book of Fables and Folk Stories
