= Kjøbenhavnsposten =

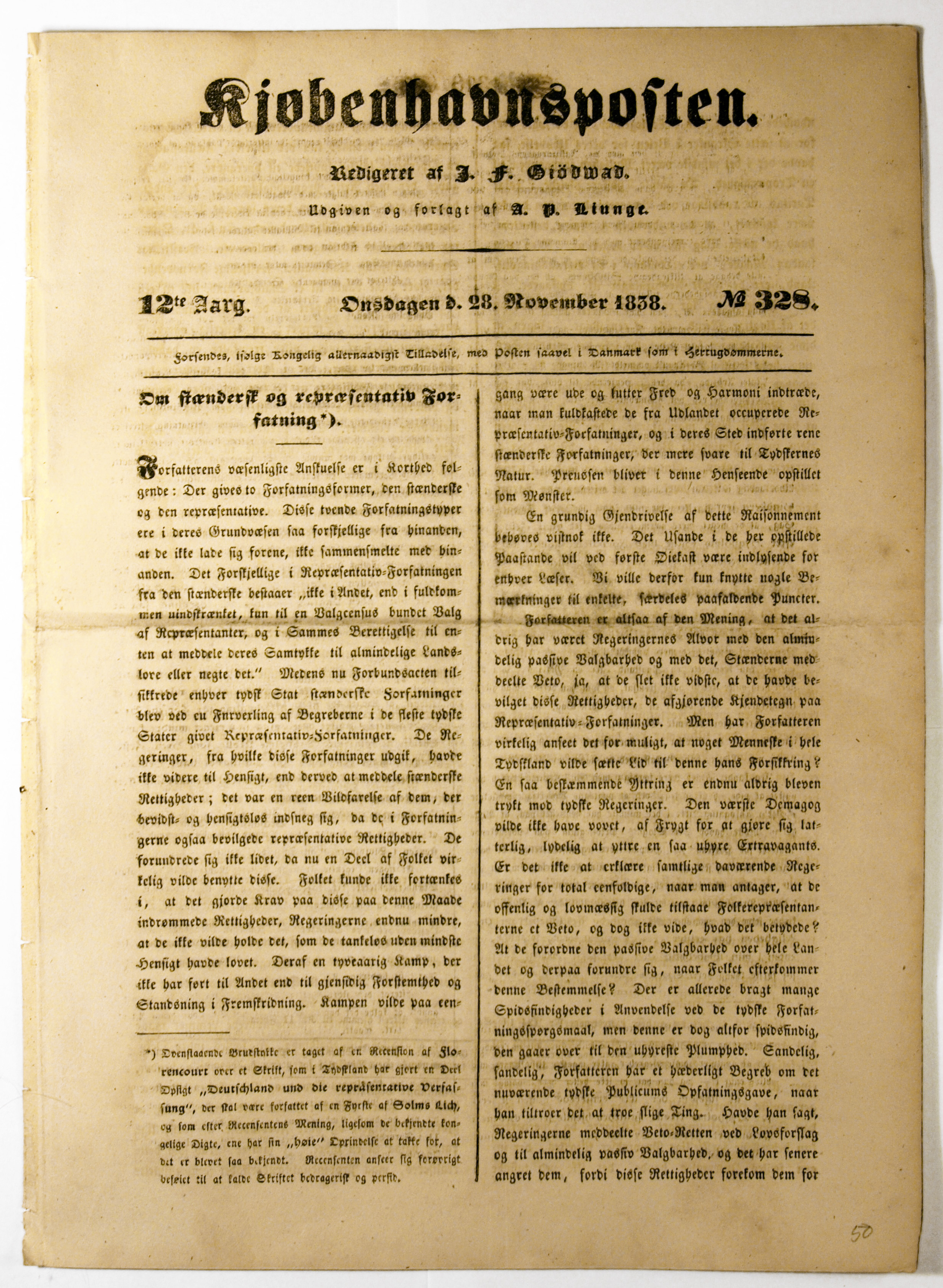
Front page of Kjøbenhavnsposten from 28 November 1838; the heading states "on estate and representative constitution."

Kjøbenhavnsposten was a Danish oppositional newspaper founded by A. P. Liunge in 1827. The paper became the major media outlet for political Left Hegelianism in Denmark during the 1840s.

== Viewpoints ==
Kjøbenhavnsposten was an oppositional newspaper that campaigned for a democratic constitution to replace the absolutist monarchy in Denmark. Even though the strict censorship rules had been somewhat slackened during the 1830s on account of the introduction of an estates general in Denmark, the laws against political propaganda against the government remained strict. A widely used method to circumvent the censorship laws was to employ "strawman" editors who were paid to receive the fines or jail sentences that followed the transgressions of the law. Another method was to use translations of foreign articles that dealt with matters that, even though seemingly about foreign affairs, could easily be applied to political conditions in Denmark. Such is the case with the article on the scan of this edition of the newspaper. The article is a concise version of a book review originally written in German by the journalist Franz Chassot von Florencourt. Florencourt reviews the book Deutschland und die repräsentative Verfassung ('Germany and the representative Constitution'), which was allegedly written by a Prince von Solms Lich, that condemns the representative constitution. Although the article is entirely about German affairs, there is no doubt that the message is aimed at the Danish political situation. Among other things, the note in connection with the headline conveys the information that Florencourt in the full version of the book review calls the book "traitorous" and "perfidious".

== Publications ==
One of Hans Christian Andersen's first poems, Det døende Barn (the dying child) was published in the newspaper on 25 September 1827. Kjøbenhavnsposten would later on 13 May 1833 publish a parody of Hans Christian Andersen written by an anonymous author.
