= The Tallow Candle =

- Short story by Hans Christian Andersen
- Original title: Tællelyset
- Country: Denmark
- Language: Danish
- Genre: Fairy tale

Publication

Chronology
—	The Traveling Companion

"The Tallow Candle" (Danish: Tællelyset) is a 700-word literary fairytale by Danish writer Hans Christian Andersen (1805–1875).

It was written in the 1820s, making it one of his earliest works and his first known work in the fairytale genre, but its existence was apparently unknown to scholars or the public for almost two centuries. A copy of the manuscript was discovered in a filing box in the National Archives of Funen in October 2012.

== Plot ==
A tallow candle, whose parents are a sheep and a melting pot, becomes more and more disheartened as it cannot find a purpose in life. It meets a tinderbox who lights a flame on the candle, and it finally finds its right place in life and spreads joy and happiness for itself and its fellow creatures.

== Discovery ==
The manuscript was discovered in late 2012 in a suitcase with documents belonging to the Plum family in the local branch of the Danish National Archives in Funen, Denmark. The first people to come across the document were a couple doing amateur research into their family history, but they thought nothing of it since it seemed unrelated to genealogy. Later the archivist and local historian Esben Brage noted the document's signature and realized that it might be an original H. C. Andersen document. Danish experts confirmed its authorship in December 2012.

== Commentaries and criticism ==
Andersen scholars agree that the work is not of the same literary quality as his later tales, and that it has many similarities with other writings from his time at the Latinate schools in Slagelse and Elsinore. It was dedicated to Madame Bunkeflod, a vicar's widow and one of the young Andersen's benefactors. One scholar argued that the tale was overly didactic and moralistic, and lacking Andersen's later sense of humor, probably to impress his benefactress, who had paid for his education. Danish author and Andersen specialist Johannes Møllehave opined that the tale could have been written by any bright 15-year-old and that it displayed nothing of Andersen's later virtuosity.

Two Danish philologists have expressed doubts about the authorship of the fairy tale. They argue that the tale is too close in form to the models used in the Latinate schools of the time for it to be likely to be an original composition, and they have also expressed disbelief in the use of the word formfuldendt ("flawless") which does not otherwise appear in texts until much later. Since the manuscript is difficult to read there is a possibility that what is written is in fact another word.

Christian Graugaard, a Danish poet and professor of sexology, has analyzed the tale as a covert autoerotic tale, in which the candle symbolizes the phallus and the melting tallow the semen in an ejaculation. According to him Andersen often added erotic undertones and metaphoric phallic imagery in his tales. He characterizes the fairy tale as "a literary cumshot".

== See also ==
- Hans Christian Andersen bibliography
