= Riverside Magazine For Young People =

19th century American children's magazine

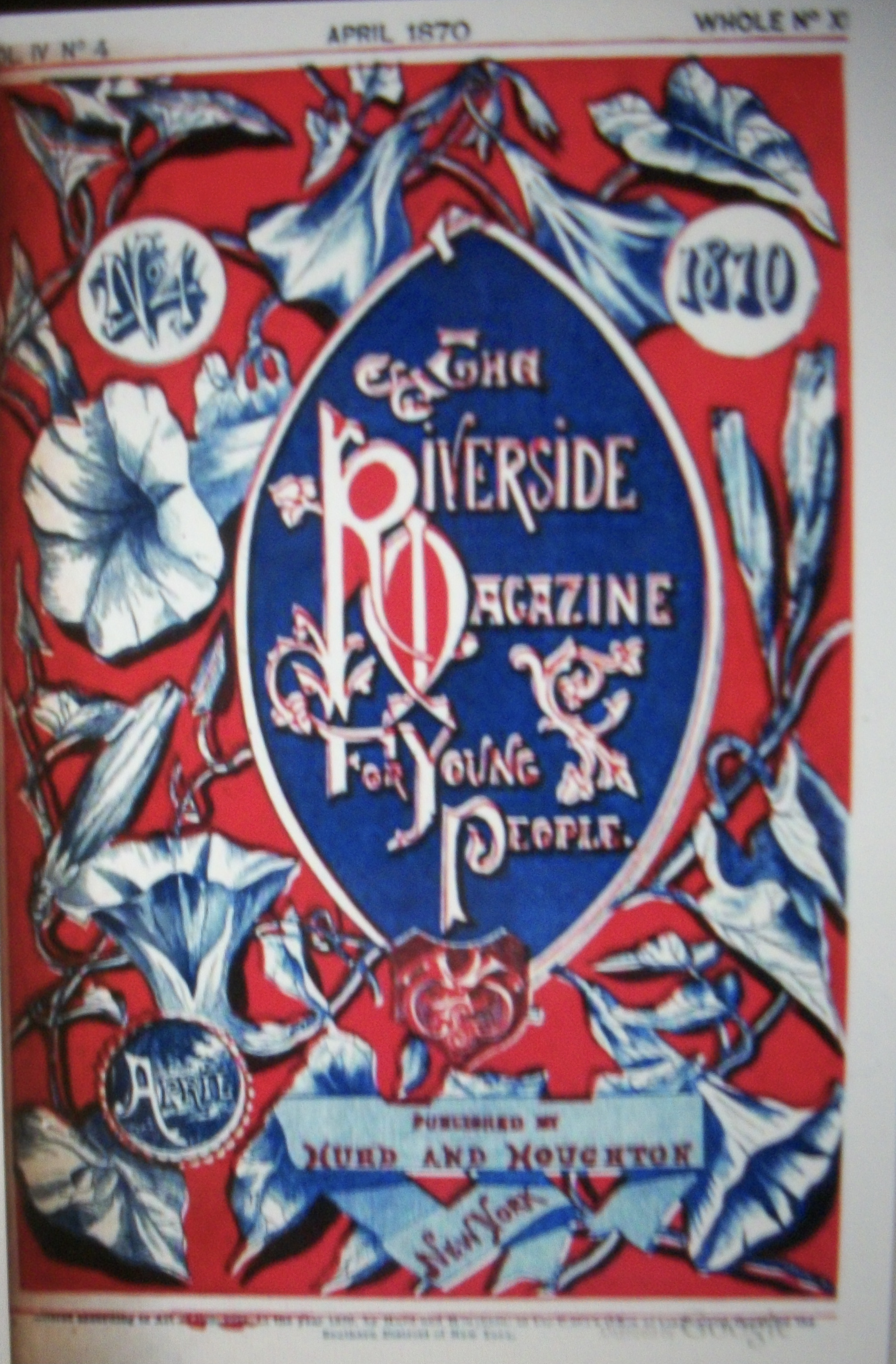
- Cover of the April 1870 issue
- Editor: Horace Scudder
- Categories: Children’s magazine
- Frequency: Monthly
- Publisher: Hurd & Houghton
- First issue: January 1867
- Final issue: December 1870
- Country: United States

The Riverside Magazine For Young People was a monthly United States children's magazine, published between January 1867 and December 1870. It was founded by Henry Oscar Houghton, who named the periodical after his former business, Riverside Press, of Cambridge, Massachusetts. The magazine was published by Hurd & Houghton in New York City and it printed stories written by Mary Mapes Dodge, Sarah Orne Jewett, Rose Terry Cooke, Hans Christian Andersen and other authors who were well known at the time. In 1871 the magazine merged with Scribner’s Monthly.

== Editor ==
The editor was Horace Scudder, who stressed literary value over the moral-of-the-story style emphasized in some children's magazines of the nineteenth century. Scudder believed that reading material offered to children should not be limited to stories written especially for them, and he regularly included Shakespeare, plus translations of Greek and Roman authors in the magazine.

== Content ==
The magazine contained 48 pages of well-illustrated short stories, articles, poems and serialized stories. The page count did not include advertising sections at the front and back of each issue. No advertising appeared amongst the stories. Each copy of the monthly magazine had a red and blue cover illustrated with morning glories.

Subscription price was $2.50 per year; clergymen and teachers were offered a discounted subscription price of $2.00 per year.

== Hans Christian Andersen ==
Horace Scudder was an admirer of Hans Christian Andersen of Denmark. Scudder taught himself to read and write the Danish language in order to correspond with the writer, and to check the translations of Andersen's stories. In March 1868 he offered Andersen $500 for a dozen new stories to be published in Riverside Magazine For Young People.

Sixteen of Andersen's stories were published in the magazine, and ten of them appeared there before they were printed in Denmark.

== Magazine’s demise ==
The periodical never had a circulation above 20,000. It did not earn a profit, so after December 1870 the subscription list was absorbed into Scribner’s Monthly, a new magazine for adults. In the last issue of the children's periodical editor Horace Elisha Scudder wrote:

You have had the ‘Riverside’ for four years, and I believe you have enjoyed it, for I have not yet seen the boy or girl who ‘hates that old Magazine.’ I have seen a great many who like it thoroughly, and many pleasant letters from old and young make me believe it, whether I want to or not, and I want to. Now you will never have a fifth volume of the ‘Riverside,’ so enjoy the four! And I have had four or five years of pleasure, editing this Magazine. Nobody can take those away from me. I have made friends by it that I hope never to lose. I do not expect to edit any more magazines for young people, but I mean to enjoy the recollection of the days when I edited the ‘Riverside,’ and had the pleasure every month of seeing its bright cover flying away, with its treasure of story and verse and picture, to gladden the eyes of children whom I never should see. If the editors of ‘Scribner’s Monthly’ and my grown friends are as good friends as we have been, nobody could ask for more.

In 1874, more than three years after the periodical's last issue had been published, a poll taken amongst readers of The Literary World ranked The Riverside Magazine For Young People to be second amongst “modern American juvenile magazines.”
