= The Snowman (fairy tale) =

Fairy tale by Andersen

- Short story by Hans Christian Andersen
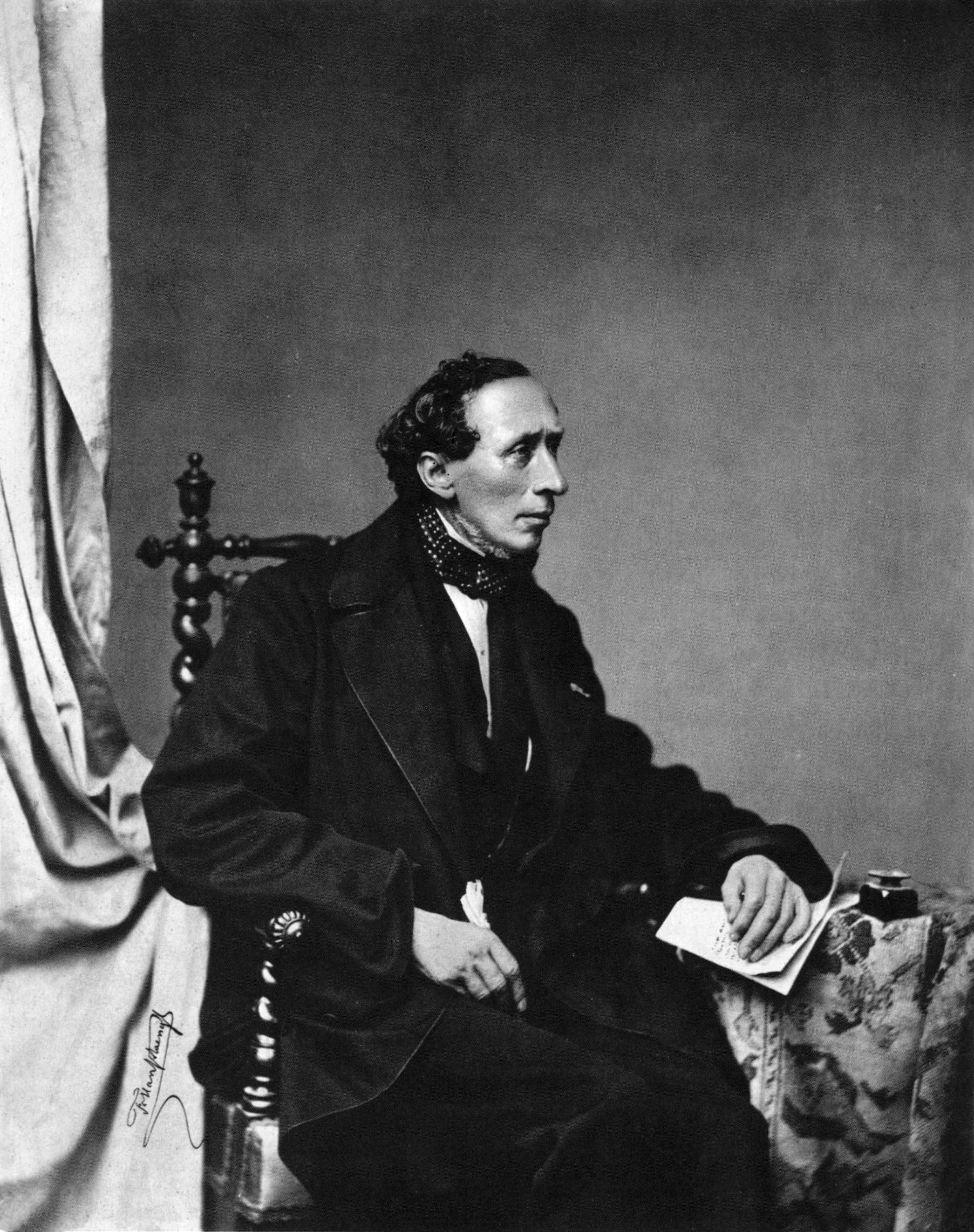
- The Hanfstaengl portrait of Andersen; July 1860
- Original title: Sneemanden
- Country: Denmark
- Language: Danish
- Genre: Literary fairy tale

Publication
- Published in: New Fairy Tales and Stories. Second Series. First Collection. 1861. (Nye Eventyr og Historier. Anden Række. Første Samling. 1861.)
- Publication type: Fairy tale collection
- Publisher: C.A. Reitzel
- Media type: Print
- Publication date: 2 March 1861

Chronology
What the Old Man Does is Always Right	In the Duck Yard

"The Snowman" (Danish: Sneemanden) is a literary fairy tale by Hans Christian Andersen about a snowman who falls in love with a stove. It was published by C.A. Reitzel in Copenhagen as Sneemanden on 2 March 1861. Andersen biographer Jackie Wullschlager describes the tale as a lyrical and poignant complement to Andersen's "The Fir-Tree" of December 1844.

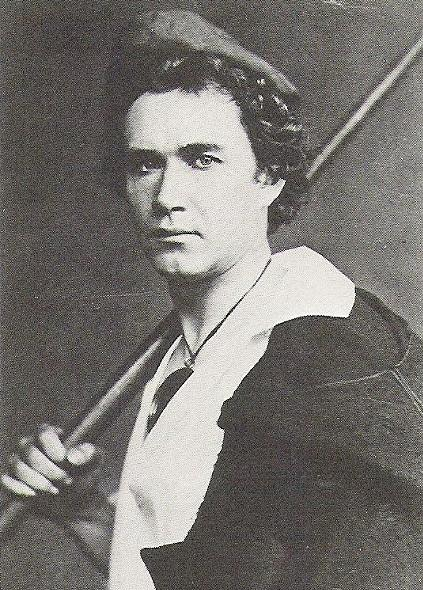
Scharff as Gennaro in Bournonville's ballet Napoli, 1860

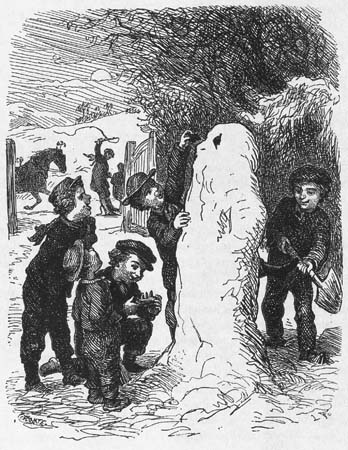
An illustration c. 1870 from "The Snowman": "He had been born amid the triumphant shouts of the boys, and welcomed by the jingling of sleigh bells and the cracking of whips from the passing sleighs." ("The Snowman". H.C. Andersen, translated by Jean Hersholt, 1949)
