= Alyson Leigh Rosenfeld =

American voice actress (born 1987)

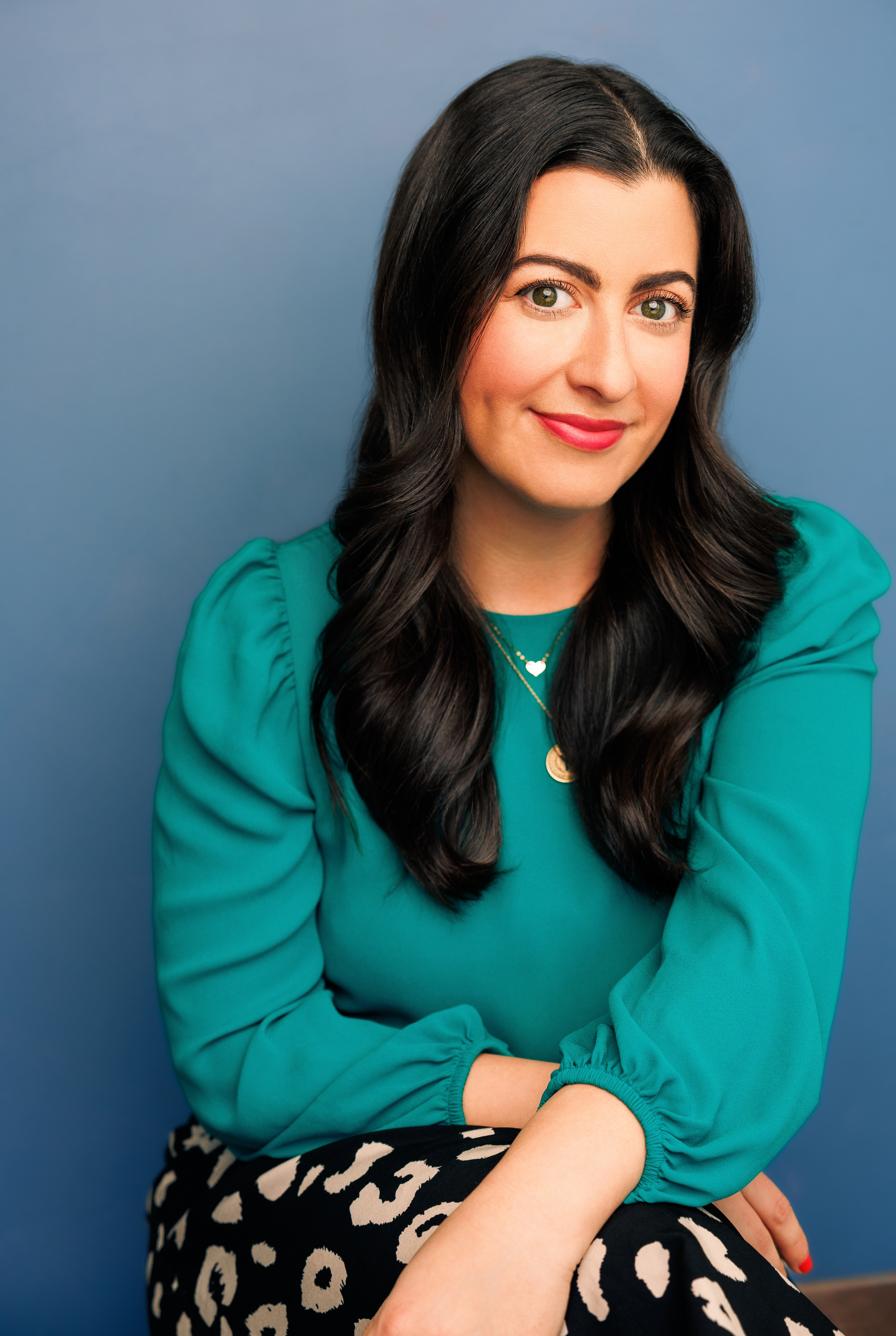
- Born: March 21, 1987 (age 39); New York City, U.S.
- Education: New York University
- Occupation: Actress
- Years active: 1999–present
- Spouse: James Weaver Clark (m. 2017)
- Children: 1
- Website: alysonleighrosenfeld.com

Alyson Leigh Rosenfeld (born March 21, 1987) is an American voice actress, known for voicing some of the various characters including Bonnie, Nurse Joy, and Sophocles in the Pokémon anime, and Rio on Yu-Gi-Oh! Zexal.

== Early life ==
Alyson Leigh Rosenfeld was born on March 21, 1987 in New York City. She has Jewish and Latina heritage. She graduated from New York University.

== Career ==
=== Anime and animation ===
Rosenfeld is best known for voicing Bonnie, Nurse Joy, Sophocles (and many others) on Pokémon, as well as Rio Kastle, Riley, Grace and Gloria Tyler (and many others) on Yu-Gi-Oh!, Aina Ardebit in the anime film Promare, Polly Pocket in Polly Pocket short web and television series from 2014, Fraw Bow and LunaMaria Hawke in the Gundam anime universe, and many other notable roles.

=== Theatre ===
Rosenfeld played Manicka in The Last Cyclist, an absurdist comedy about the Holocaust, between May 30 and June 9, 2013, at the West End Theatre.

Between March 7 and 29, 2015, Rosenfeld starred as the titular role in Stephen Schwartz's first professional NYC production of The Baker's Wife at The Gallery Players.

Rosenfeld starred as Gertrude in Lynn Ahrens & Stephen Flaherty's Seussical at The Gallery Players from January 29 until February 21, 2016.

Between January 28 and February 19, 2017, Rosenfeld starred in Stephen Sondheim's Marry Me a Little and as Lucy in You're a Good Man, Charlie Brown. Both shows were performed in rep.

Between January 27 and February 18, 2018, Rosenfeld performed in William Finn's A New Brain as Rhoda.

Rosenfeld starred as Princess Winnifred in Mary Rodgers' Once Upon a Mattress between February 22 and March 17, 2019.

== Personal life ==
On October 20, 2017, Rosenfeld married fellow voice actor James Weaver Clark. They had first met at New York University.

In October 2019, Rosenfeld announced that she was expecting her first child, and on April 28, 2020, she announced the birth of a boy.

== Credits ==
=== Film ===
Year	Title	Role	Notes	Ref.
2010	Pokémon—Zoroark: Master of Illusions	Peg / Kricketot		
2012	Psychic School Wars	Kahori Harukawa		
2012	Pokémon the Movie: Kyurem vs. the Sword of Justice	Nurse Joy		
2013	Pokémon the Movie: Genesect and the Legend Awakened	Nurse Joy		
2013	Axel: The Biggest Little Hero	Second Guardian		
2014	Pokémon the Movie: Diancie and the Cocoon of Destruction	Bonnie		
2015	Pokémon the Movie: Hoopa and the Clash of Ages	Bonnie		
2015	Birdboy: The Forgotten Children	Psychopath		
2015	Yoko and His Friends	Mai		
2016	Pokémon the Movie: Volcanion and the Mechanical Marvel	Bonnie		
2016	The Snow Queen 3: Fire and Ice	Troll Kid		
2016	Mobile Suit Gundam: The Origin IV – Eve of Destiny	Fraw Bow		
2016	Your Name	Sakura		
2016	The Dragon Spell	Rocky		
2016	Yu-Gi-Oh! The Dark Side of Dimensions	Little Girl		
2016	Sheep and Wolves	Shaya		
2017	Lu over the Wall	Isaki		
2017	Mazinger Z: Infinity	Sayaka Yumi		
2017	Mobile Suit Gundam: The Origin V – Clash at Loum	Fraw Bow		
2017	Axel 2: Adventures of the Spacekids	Gaga		
2017	Kikoriki: Legend of the Golden Dragon	Rosa		
2017	The Little Penguin Pororo's Dinosaur Island Adventure	Patty		
2018	Pokémon the Movie: The Power of Us	Nurse Joy		
2018	Mobile Suit Gundam: The Origin VI – Rise of the Red Comet	Fraw Bow		
2018	Liz and the Blue Bird	Hazuko Kato		
2018	The Snow Queen 4: Mirrorlands	Troll Kid		
2018	The Stolen Princess	Mila		
2018	Kikoriko DejaVu	Rosa		
2018	Okko's Inn	Sakiko Seki		
2019	Promare	Aina Ardebit		
2019	Fantastic Return to Oz	Dorothy		
2019	Pokémon: Mewtwo Strikes Back – Evolution	Nurse Joy		
2020	The Last Cyclist	Jana Sedova / Manicka / Red		
2021	Secret Magic Control Agency	Young Hansel / Mermaid Queen		
2021	7 Women and a Murder	Susanna		
2021	Gulliver Returns	Marcy		
2022	The Nutcracker and the Magic Flute	Marie		
2022	Cucuruz Doan's Island	Fraw Bow		
2024	Mobile Suit Gundam SEED Freedom	Lunamaria Hawke		

=== Television ===
Year	Title	Role	Notes	Ref.
2011–present	Pokémon	Nurse Joy / Bonnie / Sophocles / Audino / Bunnelby / Pikachu (female) / Cubchoo / Bounsweet / Steenee / Tsareena		
2011–2022	Robocar Poli	Cleany		
2012–2014	Yu-Gi-Oh! Zexal II	Rio Kastle / Marin, Iris, Mira Tsukumo (Second voice), Ponta (Season 6)		
2013–2016	Alisa Knows What to Do!	Natalie		
2014–2018	Super 4	Princess Leonora / Fairy Queen		
2014	Tip the Mouse	Tip		
2014–2017	Yu-Gi-Oh! Arc-V	Allie / Riley / Amanda / Grace Tyler / Gloria Tyler		
2015	Be-Be Bears	Franny Fox		
2015–2019	Winx Club	Musa / Miele		
2016	Lastman	Siri		
2016	World of Winx	Evans		
2016–2018	Regal Academy	Joy LeFrog		
2016–2019	Yoko	Mai		
2017	Snack World	Penne / Shee / Pluglet		
2017	P. King Duckling	OC Actress		
2017–2019	Yu-Gi-Oh! VRAINS	Queen		
2017–2018	Nella the Princess Knight	Olivia		
2018	Strawberry Shortcake	Strawberry Shortcake		
2018–2019	44 Cats	Lola / Fleur / Neko		
2019	Pinkalicious & Peterrific	Fairy		
2019	Apollo's Tall Tales	Marguerite		
2019–2024	Boy Girl Dog Cat Mouse Cheese	Girl		
2020	Kid-E-Cats	Smudge / Mustard		
2020	Maesetsu! Opening Act	Eru Kusaba		
2020–present	Bread Barbershop	Lemon Tart Princess / Big Head Cupcake Donut Mama		
2021	Insiders	Maria / Cynthia		
2021–2022	Emojitown	Joanie		
2022	Mobile Suit Gundam Seed Destiny	LunaMaria Hawke	Remastered version	
2026–present	Brookhaven	Skye/Additional Voices		
2026–present	Breaking in Brookhaven	Skye		
2026–present	Meanwhile in Brookhaven	Skye		

=== Video games ===
Year	Title	Role	Notes	Ref.
2012	PokéPark 2: Wonders Beyond	Audino		
2012	Pokémon Mystery Dungeon: Gates to Infinity	Pikachu		
2014	Smite	Lady Liberty Nox		
2015	White Day: A Labyrinth Named School	Ghosts		
2016	Yu-Gi-Oh! Duel Links	Yubel Rio Kastle/Marin Mickey		
2016	Dragon Mania Legends	Dragons		
2017	Modern Combat Versus	Mi-Nu		
2018	Pathfinder: Kingmaker	Octavia		
2018	Dead Rivals	Additional Voices		
2021	Yu-Gi-Oh! Rush Duel: Dawn of the Battle Royale!!	Female Drone		
2021	Pathfinder: Wrath of the Righteous	Queen Galfrey		
2023	Wo Long: Fallen Destiny	Additional Voices		
2023	Arknights	Pozëmka		
TBA	He-Man and the Masters of the Universe: Dragon Pearl of Destruction	She-Ra / Princess Adora		

=== Web series ===
Year	Title	Role	Notes	Ref.
2013	Parker & Steve	Gabby	Also producer	
2014	Crumbly Kitchen	Liz Berger	Also co-creator and co-writer	
2019–2021	Om Nom Stories	Om Nelle	Episode: "Magic Mic" (also sung the theme songs for seasons 13–14 and 18–26)	
