= Kotori =

- Gender: Female

Origin
- Origin: Japanese
- Meaning: Different meanings depending on the kanji used

Kotori is a feminine Japanese given name. Notable people with the name include:

- Kotori Koiwai (小岩井 ことり; born 1990), Japanese voice actress
- Kotori Momoyuki, manga artist of Pink Innocent and Princess Debut
- Kotori Shigemoto (重本 ことり; born 1996), Japanese television personality, model, singer and voice actress
- Kotori Music, American Riddim dubstep producer and DJ.

== Fictional characters ==
- Kotori Habane (羽々音 小鳥), a character in the visual novel If My Heart Had Wings
- Kotori Haruno (春野 琴梨), a character in the visual novel Kita e
- Kotori Hasutani (蓮谷 小鳥), a character in the manga series Cat Paradise
- Kotori Iida (飯田 小鳥), a character in the manga series Sweetness and Lightning
- Kotori Itsuka (五河 琴里), a character in the light novel series Date A Live
- Kotori Kanbe (神戸 小鳥), a character in the visual novel Rewrite
- Kotori Minami (南 ことり), a character in the media franchise Love Live!
- Kotori Mizuki (観月 小鳥), English name Tori Meadows, a character in the anime series Yu-Gi-Oh! Zexal
- Kotori Monou (桃生 小鳥), a character in the manga series X
- Kotori Nanaya (七谷 小鳥), a character in the light novel series Magical Girl Raising Project
- Kotori Nonomura (野々村 小鳥), a character in the visual novel Triangle Heart
- Kotori Otonashi (音無 小鳥), a character in the video game series The Idolmaster
- Kotori Shirakawa (白河 ことり), a character in the visual novel Da Capo
- Kotori Takatori (鷹鳥 小鳥), a character in the manga series Brynhildr in the Darkness
