= Dog pound (disambiguation) =

A dog pound is a type of animal shelter.

Dog pound may also refer to:

- Tha Dogg Pound, a hip-hop duo
- Dawg Pound, a Cleveland Browns cheering section
- Dog Pound (film), a 2010 Canadian film
- Brookhaven, Fresno, California, a neighborhood with the colloquial name of "Dogpound"

== See also ==
- Kennel
