= Marry Me a Little (musical) =

Musical revue by Stephen Sondheim

- Original Cast Album
- Music: Stephen Sondheim
- Lyrics: Stephen Sondheim
- Book: Revue
- Basis: An original idea by Craig Lucas; Norman René
- Productions: 1980 Off-Off Broadway; 1981 Off Broadway; 2012 Off Broadway; 2024 Stage Door Theatre, Covent Garden

Marry Me a Little is a musical with lyrics and music by Stephen Sondheim, conceived by Craig Lucas and Norman René. The revue sets songs cut from Sondheim's better-known musicals, as well as from his then-unproduced musical Saturday Night, to a dialogue-free plot about two lonely New York single people, who express their passions, fantasies and longings during an evening in their separate one-room apartments. For the purposes of a unique stage convention, both apartments are merged into one and both characters inhabit the same space. Although they never meet during the course of the musical, they occasionally interact as fantasized romantic companions or counterpoints.

== History ==
The musical originally was staged by the off-off-Broadway Production Company. It opened on October 29, 1980, and closed on December 28, 1980. It re-opened on March 12, 1981, at the Off-Broadway Actor's Playhouse, where it ran for 96 performances. Directed by René and choreographed by Don Johanson, it starred Craig Lucas and Suzanne Henry. On June 7, 1982, the musical opened at the King's Head Theatre, London, directed by Robert Cushman and choreographed by Dennis Grimaldi. In 1983, it saw its West Coast professional premiere at The Met Theatre in West Hollywood, directed and choreographed by Gary Mascaro and starring Brad Maule (General Hospital) and Pamela Hall (1776). The revue has been performed in US regional theaters such as GroundWorks Theatre, Nashville, Tennessee, in March 2009 and the Cincinnati Playhouse in the Park, Cincinnati, Ohio, in May 2009.

In late 1998 actor Steve Gideon proposed a revival of the work with the casting of a male same-sex couple to play the leads. He approached Stephen Sondheim with the idea and was given permission. The new version of the work debuted at the Celebration Theatre in Hollywood, California, in 1999.

In 2008, Marry Me a Little was performed in South Africa in a production starring David Fick opposite Talia Egelhof, and then opposite Nathan Fredericks, in two successive runs of the show at the Intimate Theatre in Cape Town from 28 June – 5 July. The production was directed by Jacqui Kowen, with musical direction by Victor Tichart.

In 2012, the Off-Broadway Keen Company presented a new version of Marry Me a Little starring Jason Tam and Lauren Molina. This production included several new songs and a new concept. The production was directed by Jonathan Silverstein and started previews on September 11, 2012, opening on October 2, 2012, at the Clurman Theatre on Theatre Row. Both Stephen Sondheim and Craig Lucas were involved in the project.

In January 2013, the New Repertory Theatre in Watertown, Massachusetts, under the direction of Ilyse Robbins, received permission to do a gender-neutral staging of Marry Me a Little, using four actors—two women and two men—and two pianists. In this version, the action takes place in four Manhattan apartments, with various pairings on songs, including: man and woman, woman and woman, and man and man (the last character pairing was particularly effective with the lyrics of "So Many People" from Saturday Night). At the end of the show, the four actors do meet for a closing finale.

In March 2014, a Canadian production of Marry Me a Little opened at the Tarragon Theatre in Toronto, directed by Adam Brazier and starring Elodie Gillett and Adrian Marchuk. The production showed the two characters living together in a relationship that eventually comes to an end.

From June 29 to August 10, 2014, a British production opened at the St James Theatre in London, directed by Hannah Chissick, under the musical direction of David Randall, and starring Simon Bailey and Laura Pitt-Pulford. The critically acclaimed, sell-out production went on to get another week at the St James Theatre's Studio from October 6 to October 11, 2014.

From January 28 to February 13, 2017, the show was presented at the Gallery Players directed by Barrie Gelles and starring Jesse Manocherian, Alyson Leigh Rosenfeld, Adrian Rifat, Paul Williams, Cassandra Dupler and Laura Cetti. A first for this show, there were three rotating casts performing each weekend: one duo was male and female, one was an all-male duo, and one was an all-female duo.

In autumn 2020, the production had a socially distanced run at the Barn Theatre in Cirencester, starring Rob Houchen, Celinde Schoenmaker and Waylon Jacobs. It was the first show of International City Theatre's 2022 season in Long Beach, California.

A production of the show was scheduled for February 16–18, 2023, at the Yale Cabaret of the David Geffen Yale School of Drama, New Haven, Connecticut.

The show opened at the Stage Door Theatre, Covent Garden on 28 February 2024, with leads Shelley Rivers and Markus Sodergren.

== Song list ==
=== Original 1980/81 version ===
- "Saturday Night" (from Saturday Night) - Woman, Man
- "Two Fairy Tales" (cut from A Little Night Music) - Woman, Man
- "Can That Boy Foxtrot!" (cut from Follies) - Woman, Man
- "All Things Bright and Beautiful" (cut from Follies) - Woman, Man
- "Bang!" (cut from A Little Night Music) - Woman, Man
- "All Things Bright and Beautiful (Part 2)" (cut from Follies) - Woman, Man
- "The Girls of Summer" (originally an instrumental theme from the 1956 play The Girls of Summer; Sondheim added lyrics sometime later) - Woman, Man
- "Uptown, Downtown" (cut from Follies) - Man
- "So Many People" (from Saturday Night) - Woman, Man
- "Your Eyes Are Blue" (cut from A Funny Thing Happened on the Way to the Forum) - Woman, Man
- "A Moment With You" (from Saturday Night) - Woman, Man
- "Marry Me a Little" (initially cut from Company, restored in all versions since 1990) - Woman
- "Happily Ever After" (cut from Company) - Man
- "Pour Le Sport" (from The Last Resorts, unproduced) - Woman, Man
- "Silly People" (cut from A Little Night Music) - Man
- "There Won't Be Trumpets" (cut from Anyone Can Whistle) - Woman, Man
- "It Wasn't Meant to Happen" (cut from Follies) - Man, Woman
- "Who Could Be Blue?" (cut from Follies) - Man, Woman
- "Little White House" (cut from Follies) - Man, Woman

=== London 1982 version ===
Same as the original production with the added songs:

- "Class" [from Saturday Night]
- "That Old Piano Roll" [cut from Follies]
- "I Do Like You" [cut from A Funny Thing Happened...]

=== 1987 York Theater Company Production ===
Same as the original production with the added song:

- "What More Do I Need?" [from Saturday Night]

=== 2012 Keen Company Production ===
Same as the original production, but dropped "Uptown, Downtown", "Pour Le Sport", and "Two Fairy Tales", and added these numbers:

- "If You Can Find Me, I'm Here" [from Evening Primrose]
- "Bring on the Girls" [cut from Follies]
- "Ah, But Underneath" [cut from Follies]
- "Rainbows" [written for an aborted film version of Into the Woods]
- "Night Waltz" [instrumental, from A Little Night Music]
