= Kid-E-Cats =

Television series

- Russian: Три кота
- Genre: Preschool; Kindergarten; Fantasy; Comedy
- Created by: Dmitry Vysotsky
- Written by: Darina Shmidt; Dmitry Vysotsky
- Country of origin: Russia
- Original language: Russian
- No. of seasons: 6
- No. of episodes: 312

Production
- Running time: 4–5 minutes

Original release
- Network: STS
- Release: October 24, 2015 – present

Kid-E-Cats (Russian: Три кота; romanized: Tri kota, lit. 'Three cats') is a Russian animated children's television series for preschoolers and kindergarteners made by CTC Media and Metrafilms Studio.

The television series has been launched in 148 countries on the Nick Jr. Channel since the end of November 2017. French free-to-air kids TV channel Gulli has picked up season one and two (for a total of 156 x five minutes) of animated preschool series Kid-E-Cats from Paris distributor APC Kids. Gulli began airing the show on January 6, 2020. Beijing Joy Culture Media (BJCM) represents Kid-E-Cats.

== Plot ==
The series follows three cats - Cookie, Pudding, and their younger sister Candy - who live in Catopolis, also known as Meowli City. The kittens spend their days playing, eating sweets, and investigating their surroundings, often guided by their parents. Recurring characters include their friends Cupcake, Chase, Boris, Smudge, Mustard, Bow, Raisin, and Dart.

Many other cats live in the town, each with their own ways of doing things. Despite their differences, they generally work toward shared decisions. Kittens learn from their parents how to consider their choices, understand others, and interact with those around them.

In every episode, Cookie, Candy and Pudding, along with Dad, Mom, Grandma, Grandpa, Uncle Muffin, Aunt Cinnamon and their little cousin Bagel, try to make the world a better place for their family and friends.

== Characters ==
=== Main ===
- Cookie (Russian – Коржик (Shortbread / Korzhik) – (voiced by Lori Gardner and Kate Bristol) is the most restless and hyperactive kitten. He is brave and the first one to propose bold and smart ideas seeking to act only, he cannot focus of his attention on just one thing, and his mind often flows, jumping from one to another proposal. He is seen to be energetic and keen on sports and likes outdoor games, such as football and badminton, and he is fond of archery, just like his grandma. He can be very helpful to his parents, whenever he is needed. He is the second youngest kitten in the family.
- Pudding (Russian – Компот (Compote)) – (voiced by Billy Bob Thompson in US dub) (David Holt in UK dub) is an inquisitive and very knowledgeable kitten for his age and is the oldest member of the cat family. He likes reading often but since he is still a kitten, his knowledge is purely theoretical. He collects puzzles, reads riddles, and can even beat Mom in checkers. Similar to his name, he is a bit overweight. He is keen on eating sweets and always has a lot of them in his pockets. He is the oldest kitten in the family, but everyone takes care of him.
- Candy (Russian – Карамелька (Caramel)) – (voiced by Kate Bristol) is the youngest member of the cat family. While quite small, she is just as sensible as the other kittens. She is also just as smart as the other kittens by nature when it comes to practical things. However, she can sometimes go a little too far, and be annoying to her older brothers. When she wins contests, she usually acts victorious by being quite bossy to her older brothers. She has different interests among her older brothers, having subconscious worldly wisdom very often, and she can also find a way out of difficult situations. It happens that copying her mother's behavior, she helps and works with her brothers to finding a solution to the problem. Her key phrases are "I know what to do!", or "I have a good idea!".
- Dad (Russian – Котя (The Cat)) (voiced by Marc Thompson) (US dub) (Andy Turvey) (UK dub) is Mom's husband and Cookie, Pudding and Candy's father. He works at the candy shop and he is usually very clumsy.
- Mom (Russian - Кисуля (Kitty)) – (voiced by Erica Schroeder) is Dad's wife and Cookie, Pudding and Candy's mother. She is often seen cooking up food for the family.
- Grandma – (Russian – Бабушка (Babushka)) (voiced by Erica Schroeder) is Mom's mother and Cookie, Pudding and Candy's maternal grandmother. She also likes cooking, and according to the Season 1 episode "Treasure", she enjoyed playing in her childhood.
- Grandpa – (Russian – Дедушка (Dedushka)) – (voiced by Tom Wayland) is Dad's father and Cookie, Pudding and Candy's paternal grandfather. According to the Season 1 episode "Kittens go Diving", he is good in swimming under water and teaches the kittens diving lessons.
- Uncle Muffin (Russian – Дядя Кекс (Dyadya Keks)) – (voiced by Wayne Grayson) is Dad's brother and the paternal uncle of the Kid-E-Cats. He is extremely educated and has a little son as shown on the Season 2 episode "Old things, new things".
- Aunt Cinnamon (Russian – Тётя Корица (Tyotya Koritsa)) – (voiced by Lori Gardner) is Mom's sister and the maternal aunt the Kid-E-Cats. She has a little son named Bagel.

=== Friends ===
- Boris (Russian – Нудик (Tedious/Nudik)) – (voiced by Tom Wayland) is a shy gray cat who is one of the Kid-E-Cats' friends, he really enjoys the circus culture a lot and wants to be a clown when he grows up.
- Cupcake (Russian – Лапочка (Honey/Lapochka)) – (voiced by Erica Schroeder) is a pink cat who is one of the Kid-E-Cats' friends and Candy's best friend. She is interested in beautiful and pretty things.
- Smudge (Russian – Сажик (Soot/Sajik)) – (voiced by Alyson Leigh Rosenfeld) is a black cat. He is one of the Kid-E-Cats' friends, he likes scary and horrifying things and enjoys scaring his friends sometimes.
- Chase (Russian – Гоня (Gonya)) – (voiced by Erica Schroeder) is a black and white cat. He is one of the Kid-E-Cats' friends and Cookie's best friend. He is very interested in the space/galaxy culture and would like to meet a real life alien one day.
- Dart (Russian – Шуруп (Screw/Shurup) – (voiced by Erica Schroeder) is a red cat. He is one of the Kid-E-Cats' friends, he enjoys learning math, and Albert Einstein's famous equation, E=MC^2, is also seen on his jumper.
- Mustard (Russian – Горчица (Gorchitsa)) – (voiced by Alyson Leigh Rosenfeld) is a violet cat and she is one of the Kid-E-Cats' friends. Like Pudding, she is also keen on eating sweets and is a bit overweight. She can sometimes be seen angry or in a bad mood and she can occasionally be seen being rude to her friends.
- Bow (Russian – Бантик (Bantik)) – (voiced by Tom Wayland) is a blue cat, he is one of the Kid-E-Cats' friends and likes listening to fairy tales, enjoys music, and wants to be an actor when he grows up.
- Raisin (Russian – Изюм (Izyum)) – (voiced by Alyson Leigh Rosenfeld) is a yellow cat, he is one of the Kid-E-Cats' friends and he really enjoys painting and wants to be an artist when he grows up.

=== Minor characters ===
- Cupcake's mother – (voiced by Kate Bristol) is Cupcake's mother. She teaches Candy how to play the piano.
- Cupcake's father – is Cupcake's father who appears in the Season 1 episodes "Movie Makers" and "A Dance Competition".
- Smudge's father – (voiced by Mark Thompson) is Smudge's father who works as a builder.
- Chase's mother – (voiced by Alyson Leigh Rosenfeld) is Chase's mother who works in a local shop.
- Chase's father – (voiced by Marc Thompson) is Chase's father who is a sports coach.
- Dart's father – (voiced by Marc Thompson) is Dart's father. Along with his son, they both work as firefighters.

=== Guest characters ===
- Police cat – (voiced by Marc Thompson)
- Female pastry chef cat – (voiced by Laurie Hymes)
- Stewardess cat – (voiced by Kate Bristol)
- Lady drowning cat – (voiced by Tom Wayland)
- TV Narrator – (voiced by Lori Gardner)
- Merchandise voice – (voiced by Tom Wayland)
- Bagel – is the Kid-E-Cats' younger cousin and Aunt Cinnamon's son.
