= Gulliver Returns =

- Theatrical release poster
- Directed by: Ilya Maksimov
- Screenplay by: Michael Ryan
- Based on: Gulliver's Travels by Jonathan Swift
- Produced by: Oleg Khodachuk; Eugene Yarmilko; Igor Nikolaev; Andrey Yakovlev; Sergey Shefir; Boris Shefir
- Edited by: Alexandr Synko
- Music by: Dmytro Shurov; Yuriy Melnychuk; Andriy Golovan
- Production companies: 95 Animation Studio; Gulliver Films Ltd.
- Distributed by: B&H Film Distribution (Ukraine); All Rights Entertainment (international)
- Release dates: June 18, 2021 (SIFF); August 19, 2021 (Ukraine)
- Running time: 90 minutes
- Countries: Ukraine; Cyprus
- Language: English
- Budget: $10 million

Gulliver Returns (titled in Ukrainian: «Гуллівер повертається», romanized: Gulliver povertaietsia) is a 2021 animated comedy film produced by 95 Animation Studio and Gulliver Films. Based on an original idea by Volodymyr Zelenskyy, Borys and Serhiy Shefir, and Andriy Yakovlev, it is directed by Ilya Maksimov, with a screenplay by Michael Ryan. The film is a loose adaptation of Gulliver's Travels by Jonathan Swift.

The film premiered at the 2021 Shanghai International Film Festival on 18 June, and was later released in Ukraine on 19 August.

== Premise ==
World traveler and adventurer Gulliver is invited to return to Lilliput, the town he previously saved from the enemy fleet of the neighboring Blefuscu.

When he arrives, he only finds indignation, panic and a hopeless crowd, as the King of Lilliput made his people believe that the legendary Giant Gulliver was returning. Instead, they discover an ordinary man, when the whole town had been getting ready and building accommodation to welcome a giant. Disappointed, the King orders Gulliver's execution. Meanwhile, the invincible Blefuscu armada is at the gates of the city and threatening again.

During his adventure, Gulliver discovers that time moves faster in Lilliput and Blefuscu than anywhere else in the world, meaning the grown Lilliputians that Gulliver met on his first adventure are now elderly or have passed away. The now-adult Lilliputians, like the current king, only remember Gulliver as a giant and have passed on that belief to their children.

Gulliver will prove that it is not necessary to be a giant to do great things, but that friendship and love can prevail, with a little bit of luck, a quirky mind and a disarming smile, a charismatic athletic body trained to be a master of swords.

== Voice cast ==
- Wayne Grayson as Gulliver
- Alyson Leigh Rosenfeld as Marcy
- Scottie Ray as the General of Blefuscu
- Billy Bob Thompson as the King of Lilliput
- Marc Thompson as Peters
- H.D. Quinn as Frelok
- Yelisaveta Zinovenko as Squick
- Tom Wayland as Pablo and a sergeant
- Samuel Weintraub as Wesley

== Production ==
=== Development ===
Gulliver Returns was originally submitted alongside a film sequel to Servant of the People by Kvartal 95 Studio at the 2016 pitching of the Ukrainian State Film Agency for state funding. However, following a controversy related to a Kvartal 95's performance in Jurmala where Volodymyr Zelenskyy –parodying the then-president of Ukraine Petro Poroshenko– referred to the government of Ukraine as "a beggar", the studio withdrew both projects from the event the next day.

According to producer Oleg Khodachuk, the final budget for the film was of $10 million USD, more than half of it coming from his own account.

=== Animation ===
A team consisting of 35 Ukrainian animators and 30 foreign animators (from countries such as Germany, Brazil, United States, Canada and Australia) worked on the creation of the animated film, under the supervision of American animator Tony Bonilla.

== Release ==
In 2019, the international rights to the film were acquired by the French-Chinese company All Rights Entertainment, which subsequently organized the screening of the project at the American Film Market (in 2019) and the European Film Market (in 2021).

== Critical reception ==
Ukrainian film critics gave Gulliver Returns a lukewarm review. The reviewer of focus.ua Konstantin Rylev called the weak script the biggest drawback of the film, saying that in his opinion "the big flaws of the film lie not in the technical side, but in the script". According to Rylev, due to the weak script, the film does not reveal the motives of the main character and his social status, does not develop a clear coordinate system of the cartoon's inner world, and also that there are almost no funny jokes in the film.
