= Brookhaven =

Brookhaven may refer to:

== Places ==
=== Canada ===
- Amesbury, Toronto, also known as Brookhaven-Amesbury, a Toronto neighbourhood

=== United States ===
- Brookhaven, Georgia, a city just northeast of Atlanta
  - Brookhaven/Oglethorpe (MARTA station), a passenger rail station in Brookhaven, Georgia
- Brookhaven, Mississippi
- Brookhaven, New York, the most populous place named Brookhaven
  - Brookhaven (CDP), New York, a hamlet within the town
- Brookhaven, Pennsylvania
- Brookhaven, Fresno, California, neighborhood

== Other uses ==
- Brookhaven College, a college in Dallas, Texas
- Brookhaven Town Council, governing body of Brookhaven, New York
- Brookhaven High School (Columbus, Ohio), a high school in Columbus, Ohio
- Brookhaven National Laboratory, a research facility in Upton, New York
- Brookhaven RP, a video game on the Roblox platform
