= List of Yu-Gi-Oh! Zexal characters =

The following is a list of characters for the Yu-Gi-Oh! anime series, Yu-Gi-Oh! Zexal and its sequel, Yu-Gi-Oh! Zexal II. When applicable, names from English-language anime are on the left, while the original Japanese names (as featured in the English-language manga) are provided on the right. Character descriptions pertain to the Japanese version of the anime.

== Main characters ==
Two of the main protagonists, Yuma Tsukumo (left) and Astral (right).

Yuma Tsukumo (九十九 遊馬, Tsukumo Yūma)
Voiced by: Tasuku Hatanaka (Japanese); Eli James (English)
Yuma Tsukumo is the main protagonist of the series, an energetic 13-year-old boy who is an underachiever in both school and duels, but always takes on any challenges and never gives up; an ethic he dubs "Feeling the Flow" "High the Sky" or "Kattobingu da ore" (かっとビング, Kattobingu; adapted from the Japanese word "katto"). Yuma is the current duel champion of Heartland City. Yuma's dream is to become the strongest duelist in the universe, but his dueling skills aren't up to par yet. He wears a unique key called the "Emperor's Key" that is given to him by his traveling parents. The key unlocks a door to another dimension, where he encounters Astral. He uses a Deck given to him by his father, largely consisting of monsters that have notable play on words. Many of his monster cards are Light and Earth attribute, especially his XYZ monsters. His ace card is "Number 39: Utopia", which is able to be evolve into "Chaos Number 39: Utopia Ray". He is also given "Rank-up Magic Limited Barian's Force" by Ray Shadows which is able to evolve Utopia into "Chaos Number 39: Utopia Ray V". He obtains "Rank-Up Magic Numeron Force", which is able to evolve Utopia into "Chaos Number 39: Utopia Ray Victory". A new magic card called "Rank-Down Magic Numeron Fall" grants Yuma the ability to summon a new evolution of Utopia, "Number 39: Utopia Roots". Another Rank-Up card, "Rank-Up-Magic Astral Force" allows Utopia to evolve into "Number 39: Utopia Beyond". In his duel with Astral, Yuma gains a unique Number of his own creation, "Future Number 0: Utopic Future". As the series progress, Yuma was able to become a skillful duelist due to his teachings of Astral, it was revealed that Yuma was actually Astral's half as he uses the "Shining Draw" in their final duel.
By combining his soul with Astral's, Yuma can obtain the power of Zexal. There are currently four known Zexal forms. The first Zexal form allows Yuma to perform a "Shining Draw" and draw "Zexal Weapon" monsters from his deck, which he can use to power up Utopia. Following a battle against Vector, he gains the power to become Zexal II, which allows him to transform a card in his hand. In one instance where Astral is attacked by Vector's darkness (only revealed to be controlled by Vector's Chaos) he then fuses with Yuma into a Dark Zexal form, and can draw "Dark Zexal Weapons". When Yuma is in a head-to-head combat with Mr. Heartland he undergoes another transformation called Zexal III which allows them to maintain the Shining Draw and now they are able to use an ability called "Zexal Field".
Astral (アストラル, Asutoraru)
Voiced by: Miyu Irino (Japanese); Marc Thompson (English)
The "Original Number", Astral is a mysterious spirit from another plane of existence who has to carry out an important mission. Yuma is the only one who hears and sees him. A calculating person, Astral makes a list of his observations of Yuma and other human behaviors while offering his dueling wisdom to the boy. His aim is to obtain the 99 "Numbers" Cards which are fragments of his own memories, are scattered when he enters Yuma's dimension. Yuma gradually becomes more skilled and experienced as a duelist while maintaining his positive outlook on life. However, it is clear that Yuma and Astral work together as a team; Astral gains knowledge from Yuma about how to be more upbeat and in touch with his emotions. He usually resides in Yuma's Emperor Key's special realm, which includes a peculiar spacecraft whose components can be obtained as Astral gathers more "Numbers" cards.
Tori Meadows / Kotori Mizuki (観月 小鳥, Mizuki Kotori)
Voiced by: Mikako Komatsu (Japanese); Eileen Stevens (English)
Yuma's classmate and childhood friend. She is often depicted using her D-Gazer to watch augmented reality duels. She is shown to never leave Yuma's side, no matter what the circumstances, and seems to harbor a crush on Yuma. In the final episode of Zexal II, she confesses to him that she loves him. She is also intelligent, and good with computers. She develops a rivalry with Cathy for Yuma's affections. Tori does not duel often; throughout the entire series only one duel involving her is shown in full. She uses a Fairy Deck and her ace monster is Fairy Cheer Girl.
Kite Tenjo (天城 カイト, Tenjō Kaito)
Voiced by: Kōki Uchiyama (Japanese); Christopher Kromer (English)
Kite is the son of Dr. Faker, a "Numbers" Hunter, and one of the main characters who was collecting "Numbers" for his father in order to help his formerly sick brother, Hart. He is a major antagonist throughout most of the first series and is one of Yuma's rivals, however he becomes Yuma's ally and friend during Zexal II. Assisted by a robot named Orbital-7, he has the ability to stop time for everyone except those that possess "Numbers". When Kite defeats a "Numbers" Holder, he uses an ability called Photon Hand to remove the "Numbers" card from the person, taking their soul along with it, thereby rapidly aging the body of the person affected. Kite possesses 15 "Numbers", but loses them to Yuma. He wields a "Photon" deck, that focuses on extraterrestrial monsters and magic, and many of his monsters are associated with light and wind as a consequence. His key card is "Galaxy-Eyes Photon Dragon", an anti-XYZ support monster. Kite upgrades his monster with Hart's power, granting him the XYZ Monster "Neo Galaxy-Eyes Photon Dragon". He obtains the Number monster "Number 62: Galaxy-Eyes Prime Photon Dragon".

=== Yuma's family ===
Kari Tsukumo / Akari Tsukumo (九十九 明里, Tsukumo Akari)
Voiced by: Nami Miyahara (Japanese); Jessica Paquet (English)
Yuma's older sister, who works from home as a reporter and is always on the lookout for a scoop. She is generally against Yuma dueling as she is often worries about his safety. She is strict but cares for Yuma.
Haru Tsukumo (九十九 春, Tsukumo Haru)
Voiced by: Ikuko Tani (Japanese); Kathryn Cahill (English)
Yuma and Kari's grandmother, who looks after them with their parents on business trips. She is often kind but will occasionally get strict over certain matters.
Kazuma Tsukumo (九十九 一馬, Tsukumo Kazuma)
Voiced by: Ichirō Mikami (Japanese); Sean Schemmel (English)
Yuma and Kari's father, who is the original owner of Yuma's deck. During a dangerous expedition, he encounters a being from the Astral World and is given the Golden Key, which he gives to Yuma to give him courage. According to Quinton, he is currently in Astral World somewhere, having been betrayed by Dr. Faker.
Mira Tsukumo / Mirai Tsukumo (九十九 未来, Tsukumo Mirai)
Voiced by: Eri Miyajima (Japanese); Veronica Taylor, Alyson Leigh Rosenfeld (English)
Yuma and Kari's mother, who often goes on travels with Kazuma.

=== Classmates ===
Bronk Stone / Tetsuo Takeda (武田 鉄男, Takeda Tetsuo)
Voiced by: Makoto Shimada (Japanese); Sean Schemmel (English)
Yuma's close friend and a very skilled brutish duelist, but is defeated by Shark in the first episode. He is known to have defeated Yuma about 20 times already, and speculates if Astral really exists. He claims that he beat Yuma with what he calls, "pure skill". Despite his harsh behavior toward Yuma, he regards him as a friend. He often rides around on a skateboard. He develops a crush on Shark's sister, Rio. He plays a Gearspring deck; his ace card is "Tin Archduke".
Caswell Francis (等々力 孝, Todoroki Takashi)
Voiced by: Taishi Murata (Japanese); Jason Griffith (English)
The class president in Yuma's class. He tends to add "in the end" (トドのつまり, todo no tsumari; lit. 'to summarise') to his statements, even when it is not necessarily a summary.
Flip Turner (表裏 徳之助, Otomeura Tokunosuke)
Voiced by: Aki Kanada (Japanese); Justin Boyd (English)
A wily and mischievous kid who often notes that everything in the whole world has a flipside. His English anime name is a reference to Flip Effect monsters in the Yu-Gi-Oh! trading card game. He is bullied and considered unintelligent during his childhood, Flip had learns to play dirty in order to win duels. However, Yuma beats him in a duel, and he learns to be more friendly. His deck mainly consists of monsters that use Flip Effects, and he has a habit of ending his sentences with "ura", meaning "reversed". Flip has a crafty personality similar to the character Weevil Underwood from the original Yu-Gi-Oh! series. Flip has a big tendency to scheme and to prank others. In the World Duel Carnival, he uses a zombie type deck that doesn't consist of XYZ Monsters.
Cathy Katherine (キャッシー, Kyasshī)
Voiced by: Yū Kobayashi (Japanese); Bella Hudson (English)
Known as Cat for short, Cathy is a shy girl who has a crush on Yuma but doesn't stand out too well in class. She is slightly more confident as a duelist, using a Cat themed deck. She is rumored to have the ability to communicate with cats.
Anna Kaboom / Anna Kozuki (神月 アンナ, Kōzuki Anna)
Voiced by: Rei Mochizuki (Japanese); Suzy Myers (English)
A classmate of Yuma and Tori who moves out of Yuma's school. She supposedly has a crush on Yuma, but realizes that the boy she actually likes is a boy with a similar name. She carries around a large rocket launcher that can also be used as a hoverjet, which she tends to have trouble controlling properly. She unexpectedly crashes into projectiles. She appears in the World Duel Carnival finals though is knocked out during the knockout phase while protecting Yuma. She uses a "Railroad" deck which focuses on summoning high-level monsters such as "Rocket Arrow Express" and dealing effect damage. Her ace card is "Superdreadnought Rail Cannon Gustav Max".

=== Others ===
Hart Tenjo (天城 ハルト, Tenjō Haruto)
Voiced by: Yūko Sanpei (Japanese); Rebecca Soler (English)
He is Kite's younger brother and Dr. Faker's youngest son who can create paths to other realities. He uses this ability to send trash collected from Heartland City to attack Astral's homeworld. When he is captured by Vetrix, the majority of his powers are stolen by him, but sensing that his brother is in danger, Hart gives Kite the remainder of his power, giving him the ability to summon Neo Galaxy-Eyes Photon Dragon. After his father and Barian are defeated, Hart is healed, losing all his powers and returning to the way he was before Kite started hunting "Numbers".
Orbital 7 (オービタル7, Obitaru Sebun)
Voiced by: Tomoaki Maeno (Japanese); Sean Schemmel, Darren Dunstan (English)
Kite's robotic assistant who calls him "Master Kite". He is tall with drills in fighting form. He can also transform into a motorcycle, a jetpack and a glider.
Lillybot (オボミ)
Voiced by: Yūko Sanpei (Japanese); Eileen Stevens (English)
An assumedly female Litterbot that is originally programmed to assist in burglaries. When it becomes damaged during a getaway, it is found and repaired by Yuma and his friends and now lives with Yuma's family. She uses a Trashbot deck consisting of animals made from run down appliances.
Nelson Andrews (奥平 風也, Okudaira Fūya)
Voiced by: Yūichi Iguchi (Japanese); Wayne Grayson (English)
A child actor who plays a television character known as the Sparrow (Esper Robin (エスパー・ロビン, Esupā Robin) in the Japanese version). Unlike the character he portrays, Nelson is rather timid and is scared easily, often feeling lonely that he has to hide his true self to maintain his public image. He becomes possessed by the Number card, "Number 83: Galaxy Queen", and starts to cause trouble as his alter ego. His deck uses monsters based on characters from his show, his key card being "Esper Star Sparrow".
Roku (三沢 六十郎, Misawa Rokujūrō)
Voiced by: Shōichirō Akaboshi (Japanese); Mick Lauer, Darren Dunstan (English)
An old acquaintance of Haru who runs a Duel Sanctuary where people learn to respect Duel Monsters. He has a similar deck to the one Yugi Muto used in the original series, and is also able to fuse his monsters with the Spell, Polymerization.

== Heartland City ==
Dr. Faker (Dr.フェイカー, Dokuta Feikā)
Voiced by: Shinji Ogawa (Japanese); Ryan Stadler (English)
The father of Kite and Hart Tenjo and the main antagonist for the first half of the series, he is a seemingly evil man who desires the destruction of the Astral World via the forceful collection of all 100 "Number" cards. His evil persona is later revealed as nothing more than a farce, due in part to the revelation of a deal with a being called "Barian" regarding the well-being of Hart. As such, he took extreme interest in Hart's power, and is therefore overprotective of him. Faker was responsible for the mutation of Vetrix and the disappearance of Kazuma Tsukumo. In the manga, Dr. Faker died of an incurable illness and Mr. Heartland had been keeping this a secret to manipulate things in his favor.
Mr. Heartland (Mr.ハートランド, Misutā Hātorando)
Voiced by: Jūrōta Kosugi (Japanese); Darren Dunstan, Marc Thompson (English)
Mr. Heartland is the person in charge of relaying Dr. Faker's orders to Kite Tenjo and is the current Mayor of Heartland and a minor antagonist. During the World Duel Carnival finals, Heartland takes on the role of MC and keeps the duels away from the eyes of the public in order to have the duelist fight to their fullest potential. Later when Dr. Faker traps Yuma Tsukumo and Astral in the Sphere field, Heartland tries to prevent Tori Meadows, Kite Tenjo and Reginald "Shark" Kastle from saving them. However, they turn off the power in the room causing Heartland to fall into the Astral World initially thought to kill him. However he survives, having ended up in the Barian World, Mr. Heartland is revived by Vector in the form of a fly and later restored to his human form as the leader of the Fearsome Four.
Dextra (ドロワ, Dorowa)
Voiced by: Yumi Fukamizu (Japanese); Eva Kaminsky (English)
Mr. Heartland's right-hand woman who is a moderator for the WDC alongside Nistro. She is also a "Number" Hunter who uses a Photon Butterspy deck, spearheaded by "Photon Papilloperative" and, to a lesser extent, "Photon Alexandra Queen". She harbors feelings for Kite.
Nistro (ゴーシュ, Gōshu)
Voiced by: Go Shinomiya (Japanese); Jason Griffith (English)
Mr. Heartland's right-hand man who is a WDC moderator alongside Dextra. While initially utilizing a "Bounzer" Deck given to him by Mr. Heartland, he switches to his personal "Heroic Challenger" Deck when he decides to enter the WDC to defeat Yuma. His ace monster was "Heroic Champion - Excalibur", before giving it to Yuma after their duel in the WDC finals.

== Vetrix Family ==
Vetrix (トロン, Toron) / Byron Arclight (バイロン・アークライ, Bairon Ākuraito)
Voiced by: Sachi Kokuryu (Japanese); Michael Smith (English)
Born Byron Arclight, Vetrix is the father of Trey, Quattro, and Quinton and the secondary antagonist of the 2nd and 3rd arcs of the series. He works alongside Kazuma Tsukumo and Dr. Faker in researching the location of the door to parallel worlds. Reduced to the form of a child after a betrayal from Dr. Faker, he seeks revenge by entering the WDC. He is the object of Kite's rage because of the damage he inflicts on Hart. Vetrix duels using a "Heraldry" deck, a deck focusing on control and manipulation. Vetrix is the one who orders Quattro's attack on Rio Kastle. Vetrix also has the ability to steal people's memories and corrupt people's hearts, as shown when he steals Dextra's memories of Kite and uses his crest to amplify Shark's feelings of hate. Following his loss to Yuma, Vetrix reforms himself and leaves Heartland City to be with his sons. He is not mentioned until the final season where he is seen speeding toward Yuma and Nash's duel with Kazuma and revealed to him that he had found a way to stabilize the worlds by creating a sphere. He later works with Dr. Faker, Kite Tenjo, Hart, and Orbital 7 to help reopen the doors to the parallel worlds.
Quattro (IV, Fō) / Thomas Arclight (トーマス・アークライ, Tōmasu Ākuraito)
Voiced by: Yoshimasa Hosoya (Japanese); Michael Smith (English)
Born Thomas Arclight, he is a young man with yellow and red hair and Vetrix's middle son. He is a man of many faces. He acts polite to strangers, tortures and treats his duelist opponents with scorn, but loves his family and feels regret for the people he hurts because of his actions. Quattro wishes to be the sole taker of revenge on Dr. Faker. In the past, he was responsible for the disqualification of Reginald Kastle by letting him see his "Gravekeepers" deck. In the present, Quattro runs a "Gimmick Puppet" deck. He had 3 "Numbers" monsters in his possession, with his ace formerly being "Number 88: Gimmick Puppet of Leo". He was later defeated by Shark in the WDC finals when he used Shark Drake Vice to destroy the Gimmick Puppet of Leo and win the duel. Quattro was the object of Reginald's revenge because he hospitalized Rio, Reginald's sister, though this was later revealed to be an accident by the trap card. He then entrusts Shark to save his father before disappearing. He later appeared in season 2 of ZEXAL II where he aids Shark to fight Chironex in order to save his sister from being poisoned. After finding out Shark is the Barian Nash, he duels him again in order to bring back Shark and ranks up his "Gimmick Puppet" number monsters to take on Nash's ace, "Number 101: Silent Honor Ark" which later took on its chaos form, "Number C101: Silent Honor DARK, but was later defeated and his soul was sent to the Barian World. He was later revived after Nash's defeat and watched Yuma and Astral's duel. He then still continues his career as a professional duelist at the end of the series.

Trey (III, Surī) / Michael Arclight (ミハイル・アークライ, Mihairu Ākuraito)
Voiced by: Kyōsuke Ikeda (Japanese); Brian Hovland (English)
Born Michael Arclight, Trey is the youngest son of Vetrix, and the peacekeeper of his family, whom he cares for deeply. Incredibly caring, gentle, and self-sacrificial, he is willing to go against his own personality in an attempt to repair his long-broken apart family. Later on, he develops an interest in Yuma Tsukumo after his tag duel with him and Kite. He uses a "Chronomaly" Deck that his father gave him, which is based on various out-of-place artifacts, which he has a great interest in, notably for the Aztec, Mayan, and Inca.
Quinton (V, Bui) / Christopher Arclight (クリストファー・アークライト, Kurisutofā Ākuraito)
Voiced by: Shouma Yamamoto (Japanese); Jamal Najum Khan (English)
Born Christopher Arclight, he is the oldest son of Vetrix. Quinton is portrayed as a calm and collected character who is very loyal to his father and lashes out at anyone who disrespects him. He uses a "Space" Deck and his ace monster is "Number 9: Dyson Sphere". Approximately five years before the start of the series, Quinton was Kite's dueling mentor and teacher.

== Barian World ==
Don Thousand (ドン・サウザンド, Don Sauzando)
Voiced by: Haruhiko Jō, Mitsuru Miyamoto (Japanese); David Wills (English)
Don Thousand is the ancient deity of Barian World and the true main antagonist of the series. He battled Astral thousands of years ago but was defeated and sealed in the Great Barian Sea within the volcanic core. Eventually, Vector journeyed to the sea and released him. He merged with Vector and told him to journey to Earth to retrieve the seven-sealed "Mythyrian Numbers", which would fully revive him.

=== Seven Barian Emperors ===
Reginald Kastle / Ryoga Kamishiro (神代 凌牙, Kamishiro Ryōga) / "Shark" (シャーク, Shāku) / Nash (ナッシュ, Nasshu)
Voiced by: Toshiki Masuda (Japanese); Gary Mack (English)
Yuma's rival and a good friend and one of the main characters who was originally a championship duelist before he was disqualified for peeking at his opponent's cards, eventually becoming a delinquent and taking the nickname "Shark". Now close friends with Yuma, Shark fights the Barian threat alongside him and Kite. During his duel against Yuma, he is briefly possessed by the Number card, "Number 17: Leviathan Dragon", but Astral takes it from him after Yuma defeats him. Like his namesake, he uses a deck filled with fish-type monsters, many being based on water and darkness, his key card being "Black Ray Lancer". This XYZ monster is normally unable to destroy Numbers, but Shark seems to have put some workarounds into his deck, such as the Spell card "Armor XYZ", which equips an Xyz monster with a second one, giving the first its attack points and Number status if the equipped monster is a Number. Shark eventually obtains "Number 32: Shark Drake" to use as his new ace card. He later gains the ability to evolve "Shark Drake", much like how Yuma can evolve "Utopia", but, rather than through the feeling of love, Shark acquired it through feelings of hate. After this, Shark can summon "Chaos Number 32: Shark Drake Veiss" at will. He then later obtains a new ace "Number 73: Abyss Splash". He is later revealed to be 'Nash, the leader of the Seven Barian Emperors.
It is believed Vector had killed Nash, alongside Marin, however they were saved by Abyss who transferred their souls into the bodies of Reginald and Rio causing them to live on as children with amnesia. When they regain their memories they decide to leave Yuma's group and rejoin the Barians. Despite this, he does not wish his former allies ill: he is simply trying to prevent tragedy from occurring to his people. His new ace is "Number 101: Silent Honor ARK". Using "Rank-Up-Magic The Seventh One", he can upgrade his monster into "Chaos Number 101: Silent Honor DARK". He is killed when Don Thousand's curse is dispelled, but he is revived and chooses to live on as Shark.
Rio Kastle / Rio Kamishiro (神代 璃緒, Kamishiro Rio) / Marin (メラグ, Meragu)
Voiced by: Megumi Han (Japanese); Alyson Leigh Rosenfeld (English)
Rio is the younger twin sister of Reginald (Shark). As a part of Vetrix's plan to use Reginald as their assassin against Dr. Faker, he sent his son Quattro to duel her. It was there that Quattro played a card given to him by Vetrix which unknowingly caused the field to go on fire. Quattro was able to take Rio to safety, but she was severely injured. Quattro later lied and told Reginald that he intentionally hurt his sister to keep with the plan, even though he hated the idea that Vetrix was using him to commit atrocious actions. She eventually regains consciousness after Reginald saves her from one of Barian's mind slaves and enrolls in Yuma's school. Rio is initially shown to be a polite girl with charming looks and great athleticism that earn her attention from her classmates (especially Bronk, who develops a crush on her). However, as her brother knows, she is actually quite irritable and stern. Despite all of this, she is afraid of cats. She is later revealed to be Marin, of the Seven Barian Emperors.
It is believed Vector had killed Marin, alongside Nash, however they were saved by Abyss who transferred their souls into the bodies of Reginald and Rio causing them to live on as children with amnesia. When they regain their memories they decide to leave Yuma's group and rejoin the Barians. Her new ace is "Number 103: Ragnazero". Using "Rank-Up-Magic The Seventh One", she can upgrade her monster into "Chaos Number 103: Ragnafinity". Although she is absorbed into Don Thousand in the series' climax, Astral revives her and she chooses to live out the rest of her life as Rio.
Vector (ベクター, Bekutā) / Ray Shadows (真月 零, Shingetsu Rei)
Voiced by: Satoshi Hino (Japanese); Billy Bob Thompson (English)
An Emperor from Barian World, he manipulated Dr. Faker and Vetrix to achieve the Barians' agenda of destroying Astral World. After his first defeat, he orchestrated a new scheme by taking on a human form on Earth and calling himself Ray Shadows, becoming friends with Yuma Tsukumo is a gambit to orchestrate the latter's fall. When that failed, Vector released the Barian Deity, Don Thousand, and became his current host. He is also known for being extremely cruel towards his dueling opponents and fellow Barians and is incredibly insane, which leads him to random fits of deranged laughter. Vector uses an "Umbral Horror" Deck. He was in possession of one "Number" monster, "Number 66: Master Key Beetle" which he used to lure Yuma and his friends into a trap. His ace is the Over-Hundred Number, "Number 104: Masquerade". Using "Rank-Up-Magic Barian's Force", he can upgrade his monster into "Chaos Number 104: Umbral Horror Masquerade".
Dumon (ドルベ, Dorube)
Voiced by: Daisuke Hirakawa (Japanese); Jake Paque (English)
He leads his fellow Emperors, Girag, Alito and Mizar and to a lesser extent, Vector against Yuma and his friends. A conversation between himself, Girag, Alito and Mizar reveals they saved Vetrix, granted him some of the abilities of Barian World and returned him to his own world and requested he collect the "Numbers" and destroy Astral World as compensation for their altruism. With the defeat of both Vetrix and Dr. Faker, Dumon is determined that they would have to do it themselves. To that end, he sent his comrades to Earth to search for the "Numbers". He would also come to use his former comrade's name, Nash, as his alias when in human form on Earth. He uses a "Star Seraph" deck, his ace monster being "Number 102: Star Seraph Sentry". Using "Rank-Up-Magic - The Seventh One", he can upgrade his monster into "Chaos Number 102: Archfiend Seraph".
Girag (ギラグ, Giragu)
Voiced by: Kōsuke Takaguchi (Japanese); Marc Thompson (English)
He is one of the Barians who works under Dumon, he was sent to Heartland disguised as a student from Yuma's school, to acquire the "Number" cards. He uses "Rank-Up Magic Barian's Force" to brainwash people to serve Barian World. He has supernatural endurance, taking a punch from Fender in the face with no ill effects. Girag uses a "Hand" Deck, with his ace monster being "Number 106: Giant Hand". Using "Rank-Up-Magic Barian's Force" or "Rank-Up-Magic - The Seventh One", he can upgrade his monster into "Chaos Number 106: Giant Red Hand". He later showed some changes in attitude after being revived by Vector, who used Don Thousand's power to brainwash him.
Alito (アリト, Arito)
Voiced by: Takahiro Hikami (Japanese); Tony Salerno (Season 4), Marc Thompson (Season 5-6) (English)
He is one of the Barians who works under Dumon, sent to Yuma's school to assist Girag. Contrary to his mission, Alito falls for Kotori and ends up forming an unlikely friendship and rival with Yuma Tsukumo. Alito uses a "Battlin' Boxer" deck, with his ace monster being "Number 105: Battlin' Boxer Star Cestus". Using "Rank-Up-Magic Barian's Force" or "Rank-Up-Magic - The Seventh One", he can upgrade his monster into "Chaos Number 105: Battlin' Boxer Comet Cestus". Like Girag, he has some changes in attitude after being revived by Vector, who used Don Thousand's power to brainwash him.
Mizar (ミザエル, Mizaeru)
Voiced by: Genki Okawa (Japanese); Billy Bob Thompson (English)
He is one of the Barians who works under Dumon and is feared amongst his kind. His ace monster is "Number 107: Galaxy-Eyes Tachyon Dragon". Using "Rank-Up-Magic Barian's Force" or "Rank-Up-Magic - The Seventh One", he can upgrade his monster into "Chaos Number 107: Neo Galaxy-Eyes Tachyon Dragon". It has the power to reverse time, negating the effects of any card that was activated on the field. He sees Kite as his rival, vowing to see who is the superior "Galaxy-Eyes" user. However, after their final duel on the moon, Kite admitted that Mizar was the true Galaxy-Eyes user.

== Astral World ==
Eliphas (エリファス, Erifasu)
Voiced by: Kenji Hamada (Japanese); Matt W. Cody (English)
Eliphas is the will of the Astral World. When Yuma appeared in the Astral World, he constantly attacked him as he saw Yuma as a threat. Eliphas reveals to Yuma that he plans to kill Astral because he became corrupted by chaos, so Yuma challenges him to a duel in order to save his friend. Eliphas plays a "New Orders" deck and is the first person to summon a Rank 13 monster. He is the only person other than Yuma and Astral that can perform a "Shining Draw".
Enna (エナ, Ena)
Voiced by: Eri Aida (Japanese); Meredith Zeitlin (English)
She is one of citizens of the Astral World. She explains to Yuma how the Astral World and Barian World were originally one world before they separated. Enna also tells Yuma about how he holds the power of chaos within him and explains what it is and how it can heal the Astral World.

== Duelists ==
=== World Duel Carnival ===
Striker (国立 カケル, Kunitachi Kakeru)
Voiced by: Mitsuki Saiga (Japanese); Tom Wayland (English)
The first opponent Yuma faces in the World Duel Carnival, Striker is the younger brother of a pair of talented soccer players who quit soccer because he couldn't get along with others. However, he still holds a dormant love for soccer, represented by his "Soccer" deck and a soccer ball made out of Duel Monsters cards.
Cody Callum (油圧 ショーベェ, Yuatsu Shōbē)
Voiced by: Motoko Kumai (Japanese); Michael Sinterniklaas (English)
A young kid who uses a "Heavy Machinery" deck, often relying on power to make up for his short stature.
Tombo Tillbitty (矢最 豊作, Yasai Hōsaku)
Voiced by: Kenji Nomura (Japanese); Dan Green (English)
A chubby duelist who loves vegetables, especially tomatoes, and grows his own vegetables. He participates in the World Duel Carnival to fulfill his dreams of one day making a tomato-themed amusement park, and challenges opponents using a "Vegetable Deathmatch" rule, in which players must eat a vegetable in order to attack. He uses a "Tomato" Deck, his key monster being "Tomato King".
Charlie McCay (チャーリーマッコイ, Chārī Makkoi)
Voiced by: Daisuke Hirakawa (Japanese); Ryan Stadler (English)
A former acquaintance of Kazuma and lover of Kari, Charlie is a thief who stole the "Numbers" card, "Number 7: Lucky Straight", which possesses extreme powers of luck, in order to deliver it to his niece who was due for an operation.
Cameron Clix (速見 秀太, Hayami Shūta)
Voiced by: Takuya Eguchi (Japanese); Ted Lewis (English)
A freelance photographer who was good at taking pictures, but was often told by publishers to deliver for action. He was possessed by "Number 25: Force Focus", which gave him the ability to take photos which displayed a future envisioned in his head, allowing him to get the first shots of these disasters by creating them himself. He similarly uses a "Photography" Deck.
Pip (ドッグちゃん, Doggu-chan)
Voiced by: Sumire Morohoshi (Japanese); Lisa Adams (English)
A young girl in the World Duel Carnival who uses a "Dog" Deck. Because of her shyness, she hides behind her pet dog Roscoe, pretending to be a talking dog.
Triad of Terror (フォールガイズ, Fōru Gaizu)
A three man team hired by Vetrix to take on Yuma during the Duel Coaster phase. Its members consist of Wolfsbane, Jackal and Coyote who all use a "Magnet" Deck to emphasize team tactics, with Wolfsbane's ace monster being "Magnet Dragon". They are defeated by the combined efforts of Yuma, Anna and Nistro.

=== Number Holders ===
Mr. Kay (北野 右京, Kitano Ukyō)
Voiced by: Tomoaki Maeno (Japanese); Darren Dunstan (English)
Yuma's teacher and professor who was possessed by the "Number" card, "Number 34: Terror-Byte". He is quite knowledgeable about hacking and is able to create viruses, though his true intentions are to spread joy to others. He uses a "Crashbug" Deck. After creating the virus, he manages to pretend to be good and tell Yuma and his friends what happened during the incident. He then duels Yuma after revealing he was the mastermind of the virus plot. After being defeated, the virus shuts down and instead reveals a light Crashbug monster in a stadium. He sometimes appears in gym class, acting as a coach for students jumping boxes.
Scorch (陸王, Rikuō) and Chills (海王, Kaiō)
Voiced by: Daisuke Kirii and Kenji Fukuda (Japanese); Eric Stuart and Sam Riegel (English)
A pair of brothers who head up an underground group of delinquents that Reginald used to hang around with after Shark's first defeat against Yuma and becoming Nash, the leader of the Seven Barian Emperors. They become possessed by the "Number" cards "Number 61: Volcasaurus" and "Number 19: Freezadon" respectively and attempt to steal a priceless deck, but are thwarted by Yuma and Shark in a tag duel and begin flee after they're defeat. They use cheating techniques in order to know how to play off each other's cards.
Kaze (闇川)
Voiced by: Shouma Yamamoto (Japanese); Ben Stumpf (Episodes 15 to 16), unknown actor (Episode 82 to 125) (English)
A former student of Roku's Duel Sanctuary, who was possessed by "Number 12: Crimson Shadow Armor Ninja".
Fortuno (ジン)
Voiced by: Ken Narita (Japanese); Justin Badger (English)
A "Numbers" Hunter who wished to be Kite's servant by worshiping him by bowing down to Kite's own statue in a similar way to what a religious person would do, he uses traps and illusions to outwit his opponents. He had "Number 11: Big Eye", "Number 16: Shock Master" and another unspecified "Number" in his possession. The former two were taken by Yuma, while the latter was taken by Kite, along with Fortuno's soul. He slightly resembles the Joker from the DC Comics series Batman.
Number 96 (No.96 ブラック・ミスト, Nanbāzu Kyūjūroku Burakku Misuto)
Voiced by: Miyu Irino (Japanese); Marc Thompson (English)
An evil conscience residing in the "Number 96: Dark Mist" card whose appearance is initially a corrupted version of Astral's. He claims to be the strongest "Number" monster of all, and has lately become a more prominent antagonist, having acquired the Mythyrian Number "Number 65: Djinn Buster", as well as used "Rank-Up-Magic Barian's Force" to evolve both of his Numbers into Chaos Numbers, "Chaos Number 65: King Overfiend" and "Chaos Number 96: Dark Storm", which had the effect of changing his own physical form.

== Other characters ==
Mrs. Meadows (Mrs.みずき, Misesu Mizuki)
Voiced by: Kana Omuro (Japanese); Eileen Stevens (English)
Mrs. Meadows is Tori's mother.
Brianna Stone (武田 鉄子, Takeda Tetsuko)
Voiced by: TBA (Japanese); TBA (English)
Brianna is Bronk's older sister and a good friend of Kari's.
Mrs. Stone (武田 鉄美, Takeda Tetsumi)
Voiced by: Shizuka Okohira (Japanese); Sean Schemmel (English)
Tetsumi is Bronk and Brianna's mother.
Mrs. Francis (Mrs.とどろき, Misesu Todoroki)
Voiced by: TBA (Japanese); Bella Hudson (English)
Mrs. Francis is Caswell's mother.

== Manga characters ==
Kyoji Yagumo (八雲 興司, Yagumo Kyōji)
Kyoji Yagumo is a number hunter that works for Dr. Faker and is Shark's rival. He was once a kind person who lived in the same orphanage as Shark and was looked up to as a hero by the other kids of the orphanage, but now he is cruel and plans to destroy Earth as he believes that the planet isn't worth saving and that it desires destruction. According to himself, Kyoji has 8 numbers in his possession. These numbers are "Number 14: Greedy Sarameya", "Number 21: Frozen Lady Justice", "Number 23: Lancelot, Dark Knight of the Underworld", "Number 28: Titanic Moth", "Number 35: Ravenous Tarantula", "Number 70: Deadly Sin", "Number 77: The Seven Sins", "Number 84: Pain Gainer", and "Number 95: Galaxy-Eyes Dark Matter Dragon". Numbers 28 and 95 originally belonged to Kyoji before he gave them to Hart and Kite when they were blank.
Luna (瑠那, Runa)
Luna is a number hunter. She was once an assistant to Dr. Faker but after she discovered his plans to destroy both Earth and the Astral World, she turned against him. Luna convinces Shark to work together with her and was the one who gave him "Number 47: Nightmare Shark".
E'Rah (e・ラー, e Rā)
The main antagonist of the manga. She calls herself the Goddess of Despair and is the one responsible for Kyoji becoming evil, having possessed his body and giving him the powers and numbers that he now owns. E'Rah claims to be responsible for influencing several events in the lives of Yuma and his friends. She plays a deck based upon summoning dark copies of her opponent's monsters.

=== Dr. Faker's Number Hunters ===
Captain Corn (キャプテン・コーン, Kyaputen Kōn)
Captain Corn is a number hunter and the first one that Yuma fights in Heartland. Captain Corn works in a roller coaster ride and traps duelists who hold number cards in order to take their numbers away. He had "Number 50: Blackship of Corn" before it was taken away by Yuma and Astral.
Thunder Spark (サンダー・スパーク, Sandā Supāku)
Thunder Spark is a number hunter and the second one that duels Yuma in Heartland. Thunder Spark works in the Speed Field ride in order to take away the duelists numbers. He held "Number 91: Thunder Spark Dragon".
Cologne (コロン, Koron)
Cologne is a number hunter and the third one that Yuma fought in Heartland. She was once a doll that was owned by Cathy but she was discarded and thrown away when Cathy got new doll. Dr. Faker found her and brought her to life to serve him as a number hunter. After being defeated by Yuma in a duel, he befriends her and offers her a place to live with him at his house. She owned "Number 22: Zombiestein" whom she nicknamed Frankie.

=== Kyoji Yagumo's Number Hunters ===
Eviluder (イビルーダー, Ibirūdā)
Eviluder is the first number hunter that serves Kyoji Yagumo. He challenged Yuma to a duel in order to obtain his numbers. Although he pushed him into a corner during their duel, Yuma was able to win and as punishment for his failure, Kyoji Yagumo put a penalty game on Eviluder, causing him to become unconscious. Eviluder had one number which was "Number 42: Galaxy Tomahawk". His face and body appearance looks similar to Dr. Eggman from the Sonic the Hedgehog video games and TV series.
Hishakaku (飛車角, Hishakaku)
Hishakaku is the second number hunter that serves Kyoji Yagumo. When Kite attempts to leave Heartland, Hiskakaku forces him into a duel while holding Hart hostage. Hiskakaku's deck is based on the Japanese board game called Shogi and his ace monster is "Number 72: Shogi Rook".
Shadow (シャドウ, Shadou)
Shadow is the third number hunter that serves Kyoji Yagumo. Shadow lost to both Shark and Kite on purpose in order to have them take his numbers so he can lure them into a trap. Shadow had three numbers in his possession. The former two, "Number 13: Embodiment of Crime " and "Number 31: Embodiment of Punishment" were given to Kite Tenjo and Shark respectively while the latter, "Number 48: Shadow Lich" was used in a duel against Yuma. All three numbers were taken by Astral after Shadow was defeated.

== Terminology ==
=== Xyz Monsters ===
Introduced to the series are Xyz Monsters, which have also been added to the Yu-Gi-Oh! Trading Card Game. By stacking two or more monsters of the same level on top of each other, an Xyz Monster with a Rank that matches that level can be summoned. The overlaid monsters, or Overlay Units, can then be used to activate an Xyz Monster's effect. The most prominent Xyz Monsters in the anime series are the Numbers cards, some of which have Chaos Numbers counterparts.
