= List of Magical Girl Raising Project characters =

Cosplayers dressed as characters from the first novel. From left to right: Ruler, Tama, Nemurin, Hardgore Alice, Snow White, La Pucelle, Sister Nana, and Weiss Winterprison.

Magical Girl Raising Project, a Japanese light novel series created by Asari Endō and illustrated by Marui-no, features a large cast of characters. Marui-no created the original character designs, with Yukiko Aikei adapting them for animation in the first anime series, and Masako Itou for the second anime series.

== Magical Girl Raising Project ==
Snow White (スノーホワイト, Sunō Howaito) / Koyuki Himekawa (姫河 小雪, Himekawa Koyuki)
Voiced by: Nao Tōyama (Japanese); Megan Shipman (English)
A middle school student who is a huge Magical Girl fan and has dreamed of becoming one since she was young, a wish granted when Fav turns her into one. Her magical girl outfit is a white schoolgirl uniform covered with flowers. She survives the death game but is psychologically scarred by her inability to stop it. As a result, by RESTART, she joined the Magical Kingdom's Inspection Department, hunting down rogue Magical Girls to prevent similar tragedies, her achievements earning her the title <Magical Girl Hunter>. After her only fellow survivor, Ripple, goes missing following LIMITED, her overarching goal in the series becomes finding her. This culminates in RED, where she saves a mortally wounded Ripple by fusing with her, becoming a single Magical Girl named Snow Blood (スノーブラッド).
Her ability allows her to hear the voices of anyone in distress; it evolves as the series progresses, allowing her to read people's minds. Throughout the series, she also acquires various magical items, including: Hardgore Alice's lucky rabbit's foot, Swim Swim's halberd, Princess Inferno's fire guandao, and Tetty Goodgrip's strength-enhancing mittens. In addition, after fusing with Ripple and becoming Snow Blood, she gains the former's magic, making any object she throws always hit its target.

Ripple (リップル, Rippuru) / Kano Sazanami (細波 華乃, Sazanami Kano)
Voiced by: Manami Numakura (Japanese); Sarah Wiedenheft (English)
An antisocial high school student prone to getting into fights. Her magical girl outfit is a ninja-style attire. She survives the death game but loses her left eye and arm. Afterward, she became protective of the only other survivor, Snow White. In LIMITED, during a promotional exam to gain Magical Kingdom citizenship, she becomes embroiled with an investigation team sent to capture a rogue Magical Girl and later gets brainwashed by Pythie Frederica, being made to adopt the identity of the jester magical girl Stanczyka (スタンチッカ) in JOKERS. Although the brainwashing is undone following ACES, she goes into hiding out of guilt over the crimes she was made to commit and later, in WHITE, allies with Old Blue to kill Frederica in revenge. This culminates in RED, where she nearly sacrifices herself to help defeat Frederica but is saved by Snow White fusing with her, becoming a single Magical Girl named Snow Blood (スノーブラッド).
Her ability makes any object she throws always hit its target. Her Magical Girl form also has several weapons, including shuriken, kunai, and a katana.

Nemurin (ねむりん) / Nemu Sanjou (三条 合歓, Sanjō Nemu)
Voiced by: Yumiri Hanamori (Japanese); Amanda Lee (English)
A 24-year-old unemployed lazy girl, who still enjoys helping people. She wears pajamas and has cloud-like creatures coming out of her hair as her magical girl outfit. Using her ability to enter other people's dreams, she helps people by fighting off nightmares, although this doesn't earn her any Magical Candies. She is the first magical girl to die after placing last in the first ranking. However, it is later revealed that only her body died while her spirit continues to roam other people's dreams.
Her ability allows her to enter others' dreams; in this dream world, she is all-powerful, capable of making anything she thinks real.

Ruler (ルーラ, Rūra) / Sanae Mokuou (木王 早苗, Mokuō Sanae)
Voiced by: Yoko Hikasa (Japanese); Emily Neves (English)
The leader of Team Ruler; an adult female office worker who styles herself as a queen operating an abandoned temple in N-City alongside her teammates. She wears royal princess-like attire as her magical girl outfit. She is the second magical girl to die after placing last in the second ranking due to Swim Swim manipulating the scores.
Her ability allows her to make others obey her by pointing her scepter at them. However, she must stand within 5 meters of her target and remain still while using it.

La Pucelle (ラ・ピュセル, Ra Pyuseru) / Souta Kishibe (岸辺 颯太, Kishibe Sōta)
Voiced by: Ayane Sakura (Japanese); Katelyn Barr (English)
Snow White's partner and male childhood friend, who is a closet Magical Girls fan and has an obvious crush on her. As a Magical Girl, his body is entirely female, and he wears knight-style attire with draconic motifs. He is the third magical girl to die after being killed by Cranberry.
His ability allows him to change the length and size of his sword at will. The sword also comes with a scabbard, which has the same ability.

Magicaloid 44 (マジカロイド44, Majikaroido Fōtīfō) / Makoto Andou (安藤 真琴, Andō Makoto)
Voiced by: Satomi Arai (Japanese); Stephanie Garrett (English)
A 15-year-old homeless girl who cares more about using her Magical Girl abilities for financial gain than helping others. In her Magical Girl form, she is a robot. Throughout her life, she has always taken what she perceives to be the easy way out, even quitting school and running away from home. She is the fourth magical girl to die, killed by Hardgore Alice upon attempting to kill Snow White.
Her ability allows her to obtain a random futuristic gadget from her backpack once per day, but she cannot predict what it will be and it disappears at the end of the day. Her robotic body also allows her to fly.

Yunael (ユナエル, Yunaeru) / Yuna Amasato (天里 優奈, Amasato Yuna)
Voiced by: Satsumi Matsuda (Japanese); Kristin Sutton (English)
A member of Team Ruler and Minael's younger twin sister. She wears an angelic-style dress and has one wing on the left side of her outfit. She acts very childish but is a college student. She is the fifth magical girl to die, killed by Winterprison.
Her ability allows her to shapeshift into any living being. her wing also allows her to fly.

Weiss Winterprison (ヴェス・ウィンタープリズン, Vesu Wintāpurizun) / Shizuku Ashuu (亜柊 雫, Ashū Shizuku)
Voiced by: Yū Kobayashi (Japanese); Morgan Berry (English)
Sister Nana's lover. She is a college student that publicly known as the most powerful magical girl in N-City. In truth, however, this image was merely fabricated by Sister Nana, who constantly put herself in danger to allow her to be saved by her. She wears a thick winter coat as her Magical Girl outfit. She is the sixth magical girl to die, dying from blood loss following attacks from the Peaky Angels and Swim Swim.
Her ability lets her create walls of any form, depending on the terrain.

Calamity Mary (カラミティ・メアリ, Karamiti Meari) / Naoko Yamamoto (山本 奈緒子, Yamamoto Naoko)
Voiced by: Kikuko Inoue (Japanese); Mikaela Krantz (English)
A sadistic 39-year-old magical girl hired by the N-City's criminal underground. She wears a cowboy hat and has wild-west style attire as her magical girl outfit. She is the seventh magical girl to die when she shoots a piece of glass that Ripple threw at her, causing her to be impaled by the glass shards (in the anime, the shards were a distraction and she was killed by taking a shuriken to the head).
Her ability allows her to magically enhance weapons. She also owns a variety of arms, including knives, pistols, rifles, grades, and landmines.

Top Speed (トップスピード, Toppu Supīdo) / Tsubame Murota (室田 つばめ, Murota Tsubame)
Voiced by: Yumi Uchiyama (Japanese); Lindsay Seidel (English)
A cheerful veteran magical girl who is paired up with Ripple. She wears a classic black witch outfit and a witch hat as her magical girl outfit. She talks casually with an "ore" male self-referencing pronoun. She is the pregnant 19-year-old housewife of a young politician. She also used to be the leader of a biker gang. She is the eighth magical girl to die after being stabbed in the back by Swim Swim; Her unborn child died with her.
Her ability allows her to fly at breakneck speeds on her magical broomstick, Rapid Swallow.

Sister Nana (シスターナナ, Shisutā Nana) / Nana Habutae (羽二重 奈々, Habutae Nana)
Voiced by: Saori Hayami (Japanese); Tia Ballard (English)
A veteran N-City Magical Girl and Weiss Winterprison's lover. In real life, she is a college student and a sweet girl who lives with Shizuku and has dedicated her career to protecting the city and bringing a message of peace. She wears a nun-like dress as her magical girl outfit. Despite being much stronger than Weiss, Nana often relies on her for protection to fulfill her fairytale fantasies; this ultimately proves to be her undoing, as Winterprison's death completely breaks her, since she had gone out looking to cause a confrontation with Swim Swim's group to be "saved" by Winterprison. She commits suicide by hanging following Winterprison's death, becoming the ninth magical girl to die.
Her ability allows her to enhance a person's physical capabilities.

Hardgore Alice (ハードゴア・アリス, Hādogoa Arisu) / Ako Hatoda (鳩田 亜子, Hatoda Ako)
Voiced by: Rina Hidaka (Japanese); Macy Anne Johnson (English)
The recently chosen 16th and final Magical Girl of N-City. Her Magical Girl outfit is a black "Alice in Wonderland"-style dress, which others find creepy. Following La Pucelle's death, she pairs up with Snow White, though the latter only agrees out of fear of her. It later revealed that she is a young girl Snow White helped in the past, causing her to want to repay the latter. She is the tenth magical girl to die, killed by Swim Swim while untransformed.
Her ability lets her regenerate any damage taken, making her immortal while transformed.

Minael (ミナエル, Minaeru) / Mina Amasato (天里 美奈, Amasato Mina)
Voiced by: Risae Matsuda (Japanese); Alex Moore (English)
A member of Team Ruler and Yunael's older twin sister. She wears an angelic-style dress with one wing on the right side of her outfit. Initially, like her sister, she is very childish but is a college student. However, after Yunael is killed she becomes a lot more violent. She is the eleventh magical girl to die after a failed ambush on Cranberry.
Her ability allows her to shapeshift into any non-living object. She is also able to fly as a result of her wing.

Musician of the Forest, Cranberry (森の音楽家クラムベリー, Mori no Ongakuka Kuramuberī)
Voiced by: Megumi Ogata (Japanese); Anastasia Muñoz (English)
A recluse living within the ruins on the outskirts of N-City. Her outfit is decorated with wildflowers and leaves, and her appearance is that of an elf. It is later revealed that the death game is a selection exam and she is the overseer. She was once part of a selection exam that went wrong, resulting in the deaths of the other participants, after which she became obsessed with fighting strong opponents. As a result, after becoming a selection exam overseer, she started putting Magical Girls through death games whilst participating herself to replicate her own exam. She is the twelfth magical girl to die, killed by Tama. Despite this, her influence is felt throughout the series.
Her ability lets her manipulate sound waves, allowing her to distract her opponents, enhance her hearing, and create powerful sonic attacks.

Tama (たま) / Tama Inubouzaki (犬吠埼 珠, Inubōzaki Tama)
Voiced by: Asuka Nishi (Japanese); Kristen McGuire (English)
A member of Team Ruler; she is a shy and nervous girl. Her Magical Girl outfit is a dog costume. While she is less competent than her other teammates, she is grateful for being allowed to join the group. She is the thirteenth magical girl to die, killed by Swim Swim upon discovering her identity.
Her ability allows her to create a hole, up to 1m in diameter and 5m in depth, on any surface. She eventually also gains a magical cloak that can make her invisible.

Swim Swim (スイムスイム, Suimu Suimu) / Ayana Sakanagi (坂凪 綾名, Sakanagi Ayana)
Voiced by: Inori Minase (Japanese); Bryn Apprill (English)
A member of Team Ruler; she is a rather intelligent 7-year-old girl who is a huge fan of princesses, causing her to idolize Ruler. In her Magical Girl form, she is an adult wearing a swimsuit. Following an offhand remark by Nemurin about whether she would like to be a princess herself, she launches a scheme to overthrow Ruler, resulting in the latter's death and herself becoming Team Ruler's new leader. She is the fourteenth and final magical girl to die, killed by Ripple in revenge for Top Speed's death.
Her ability lets her move through solid objects as if they are liquid. She later also gains a magical halberd, which she names "Ruler".

Fav (ファヴ, Favu)
Voiced by: Kurumi Mamiya (Japanese); Madeleine Morris (English)
The mascot character of the "Magical Girl Raising Project" mobile game who turns those playing it into real Magical Girls. He orders the magical girls to fight each other by claiming that the city's mana supply will be depleted causing the city's destruction if the number of magical girls is not reduced. In truth, he is Cranberry's familiar who cooperated with her to turn the normally boring Magical Girl selection exams into deathmatches, with him sending falsified reports back to his superiors to hide their crimes. He is killed when Ripple destroys his terminal.

== Magical Girl Raising Project: RESTART ==
Shadow Gale (シャドウゲール, Shadougēru) / Mamori Totoyama (魚山護, Totoyama Mamori)
Voiced by: Reina Kondō
A member of Team Pfle; she is Pfle's butler and childhood friend, the two having always been together. Her Magical Girl attire is a dark-colored nurse's outfit. After being forced into Keek's re-selection, she grows increasingly worried that her mistress is manipulating the killing game to ensure their survival at others' expense. Although her concerns are disproven and she survives RESTART, they resurface as Pfle gets implicated in shady activities throughout the rest of the series. This culminates in ACES and QUEENS, where she gets brainwashed by Puk Puck and ends up killing Pfle, who has her memories of her erased in her final moments to spare her guilt. As a result, she survives QUEENS but is left in a vegetative state.
Her ability lets her magically upgrade any mechanical object. She also owns a gigantic wrench and giant scissors, which she uses as weapons.

Pfle (プフレ, Pufure) / Kanoe Hitokouji (人小路庚江, Hitokouji Kanoe)
Voiced by: Yoshino Nanjō
The leader of Team Pfle; heiress to a wealthy family, she is a cunning girl with only one weakness: her butler and childhood friend, Shadow Gale. Her Magical Girl self is a young lady in a wheelchair, though she can walk just fine. Though surviving RESTART, she becomes disillusioned with the Magical Kingdom and begins plotting to overthrow it with Lapis Lazuline I, with it being revealed at the end of LIMITED that all the arc's events were a cover-up to conceal her crimes. In JOKERS, she is revealed to be the sponsor of the "artificial magical girl project" and orchestrated the arc's events to unveil it to the public. However, the Kingdom eventually catches on to her, forcing her to erase her own memories to hide evidence. This culminates in ACES and QUEENS, where she regains her memories and attempts to rescue Shadow Gale, who had been brainwashed by Puk Puck, resulting in her being killed by her whilst protecting her; she is the ninth and final Magical Girl to die in QUEENS.
Her ability lies in her magical wheelchair, which can move at supersonic speeds. The wheelchair has also been modified by Shadow Gale, who added several magical gadgets.

Clantail (クランテイル, Kuranteiru) / Nene Ono (尾野寧々, Ono Nene)
Voiced by: Mariya Ise
Leader of Team Clantail; though seemingly having a stern demeanor, she is actually a shy middle school student whose only friends are animals. Her Magical Girl form resembles a centaur. She survives RESTART and begins striving to make human friends. In breakdown, Ragi Zwe Nento hires her to accompany him to the late mage Sataborn's private island to discuss inheritance. She survives the subsequent incident and is offered a job as Ragi's bodyguard, but she turns him down after learning that he withheld aid during RESTART that could have saved her comrades.
Her ability allows her to shapeshift her lower body into any animal she has extensive knowledge of. She eventually also acquires a magical spear and shield.

Magical Daisy (マジカルデイジー, Majikarudeijī) / Kiku Yakumo (八雲 菊, Yakumo Kiku)
Voiced by: Maaya Uchida
Leader of Team Daisy; a well-known Magical Girl who used to have her own anime, her fame has long-since dried up, and she is now just a washed-up college student second-guessing her life choices before being pulled into Keek's "re-selection". She wears a traditional Magical Girl outfit decorated with flowers. She is the first Magical Girl to die, killed when a cyber world monster reflected her ability back at her; her recklessness, which led to her death, is later revealed to have been a result of Nokko using her ability to ratchet up her emotions.
Her ability allows her to shoot a magical laser beam, which she calls "Daisy Beam", from her hands and fingertips.

Masked Wonder (マスクド・ワンダー, Masukudo Wandā) / Konomi Mita (三田好, Mita Konomi)
Voiced by: Fairouz Ai
A member of Team Pfle; she is a self-proclaimed "hero of justice" and Nemurin's cousin in real life. She wears an American superhero outfit as her Magical Girl attire. She is the second Magical Girl to die, hit on the head from behind with a rock by an unknown assailant; later revealed to have been Melville.
Her ability lets her control her own weight and that of others. She can also fly by making herself lighter than air.

Genopsyko Yumenoshima (夢ノ島ジェノサイ子, Yumenoshima Jenosaiko) / Karin Sonoda (園田かりん, Sonoda Karin)
Voiced by: Sayumi Suzushiro
A member of Team Daisy; often just called Genopsyko. She wears a leather suit resembling a cat as her Magical Girl attire. In real life, she is a manga artist who got pulled into Keek's re-selection. She is the third Magical Girl to die, killed by Akane. Rionetta later manipulates her corpse with her ability to kill @Meow-Meow.
Her ability lies in her Magical Girl outfit, which is completely indestructible.

Akane (アカネ, Akane) / Akane Fuwa (不破茜, Fuwa Akane)
Voiced by: Ami Koshimizu
A mentally unstable Magical Girl who is looking for a certain "musician" and attacks anyone she comes across. She wears a samurai outfit as her Magical Girl attire. It is later revealed that the musician she is looking for is actually Cranberry, who killed her entire family during one of her previous selection exams, unaware that she was already deceased by RESTART. She is the fourth Magical Girl to die, killed by @Meow-Meow after she snapped and attempted to kill the other Magical Girls.
Her ability allows her to cut everything within sight using her katana, regardless of distance.

Cherna Mouse (チェルナー・マウス, Cherunā Mausu)
Voiced by: Maria Naganawa
A member of Team Bell; a stubborn little girl who does not let anyone near her team's territory. Her magical girl outfit is a hamster costume. She is actually a wild mouse, having gained a human body upon becoming a magical girl. She is the fifth Magical Girl to die, automagically killed as part of the death game when she placed last during a Magical Candy ranking; it is later revealed that Melville messed with the numbers.
Her ability lets her increase in size with no known limit.

@Meow-Meow (＠娘々, Attomāku Nyan Nyan) / Himari Tanahashi (棚橋陽真理, Tanahashi Himari)
Voiced by: Akari Kitō
A member of Team Daisy; she becomes their new leader after Magical Daisy's death. She wears a traditional Chinese martial artist outfit as her Magical Girl attire. She is the sixth Magical Girl to die when Genopsyko, who was presumed dead, inexplicably appeared before her and pushed her into a cyber world monster's attack; it is later revealed that this was actually Rionetta manipulating Genopsyko's corpse with her ability.
She possesses a set of scrolls. Her ability allows her to seal any object into these scrolls.

Nonako Miyokata (御世方那子, Miyokata Nonako) / Anna Sarizae (アンナ・サリザエ, Anna・Sarizae)
Voiced by: Jenya
A member of Team Clantail; a European girl who just moved to Japan and struggles with the language, causing her to constantly argue with her teammate Rionetta, who cannot stand her bad accent. She dresses as a Miko for Magical Girl attire. She is the seventh Magical Girl to die after she and Rionetta got into a fight, resulting in her being killed by a cyber world monster; it is later revealed that their hostility was a result of Nokko ratcheting up their emotions through her ability.
Her ability lets her tame any animal that wears her special ribbon, though only one at a time.

Detec Bell (ディティック・ベル, Ditikku Beru) / Shinobu Hioka (氷岡忍, Hioka Shinobu)
Voiced by: Miyu Tomita
The leader of Team Bell; a young adult who works as a detective, which amounts to little more than basic chores. She wears a detective outfit as her Magical Girl attire. Throughout RESTART, she makes it her mission to find the culprit behind the mysterious deaths of Masked Wonder, Cherna Mouse, and @Meow-Meow. She is the eighth Magical Girl to die, ambushed by the murderer she was pursuing, though she leaves behind intel that exposes Melville as the culprit.
Her ability allows her to give buildings faces and bring them to life by kissing them, allowing her to interrogate them.

Rionetta (リオネッタ, Rionetta) / Rio Kujou (九条李緒, Kujou Rio)
Voiced by: M.A.O
A member of Team Clantail; a sarcastic yet sharp-tongued young lady who seeks the prize money for beating Keek's re-selection to pay off her father's debt to the mafia. Her Magical Girl form seems to be a living doll, but is actually just an ordinary doll that she remotely controls through her ability; her actual Magical Girl form is a young lady in a dress. It is eventually revealed that Melville bribed her into using Genopsyko's corpse to kill @Meow-Meow. She is the ninth Magical Girl to die, killed by Melville after she was unwilling to betray her teammates and turned on her instead.
Her ability lets her telekinetically control non-living humanoid objects, like dolls and corpses.

Pechka (ペチカ, Pechika) / Chika Tatehara (建原智香, Tatehara Chika)
Voiced by: Honoka Inoue
A member of Team Clantail; a timid middle school student who uses her status as a Magical Girl to boost her confidence. Her Magical Girl outfit resembles a Chef's uniform. After being pulled into Keek's re-selection, what little confidence she had was quickly shattered upon meeting and comparing herself to her amazing teammates. Throughout RESTART, her self-esteem gradually increases as she bonds with her teammates and eventually begins fighting alongside them. She is the tenth Magical Girl to die, sacrificing herself to shield Clantail from Melville.
Her ability allows her to turn anything she touches for five minutes, regardless of size, into food.

Melville (メルヴィル, Meruviru) / Mashiro Kuji (久慈真白, Kuji Mashiro)
Voiced by: Shiori Mikami
A member of Team Bell; she talks with a thick accent, making her difficult to understand. Her Magical Girl self is an elf dressed in an outfit decorated with flowers. She is eventually revealed to be Cranberry's former pupil and the culprit behind the deaths of Masked Wonder, Cherna Mouse, and Detec Bell, which she did to carry on her teacher's legacy. She is the eleventh Magical Girl to die, killed by Clantail while being restrained by Lapiz Lazuline.
Her ability allows her to change the color of any surface, which she primarily uses to camouflage herself, rendering her virtually invisible. She also owns a magical harpoon.

Lapis Lazuline (ラピス・ラズリーヌ, Rapisu Razurīnu) / Lapis Lazuline II (二代目ラピス・ラズリーヌ, Nidaime Rapisu Razurīnu) / Ruri Yoneda (米田瑠璃, Yoneda Ruri)
Voiced by: Aoi Yūki
A member of Team Bell; she is a childish and enthusiastic high school dropout. Her Magical Girl outfit is a blue dress with a tail and a cape made of tiger fur. She is actually the second Magical Girl named "Lapis Lazuline", having inherited it from her mentor, Lapis Lazuline I; her true Magical Girl name is Blue Comet (ブルー・コメット, Burū Kometto). As a result, she is the only Magical Girl pulled into Keek's re-selection who was not a survivor of one of Cranberry's exams, having been mistaken for her mentor, the actual survivor. She is the twelfth Magical Girl to die, succumbing to wounds she sustained while fighting Melville.
She possesses a set of magical gems, and her ability lets her teleport to wherever these gems are located.

Nokko (のっこちゃん, Nokko chan) / Noriko Nonohara (野々原紀子, Nonohara Noriko)
Voiced by: Hime Sawada
A member of Team Daisy; she is a timid ten-year-old girl who has been a Magical Girl since she was five and desires the prize money for beating the re-selection to pay her hospitalized mother's bills. Her magical girl attire is a maid outfit. She is eventually revealed to be the game's final boss, whom the Magical Girls are supposed to kill, while she, in turn, must kill them. She did this by using her ability to make them emotionally unstable, causing them to kill each other. She is the thirteenth and final Magical Girl to die, committing suicide to repent for her actions.
Her ability allows her to manipulate the emotions of others in proximity to her.

Keek (キーク, Kīku)
Voiced by: Megumi Han
The primary antagonist of RESTART; she abducted the other Magical Girls and forced them into a death game later revealed to be an unauthorized re-selection for survivors of Cranberry's previous tests. Her Magical Girl attire is a lab coat. She ultimately suffers a mental breakdown upon realizing her hypocrisy after learning from Snow White that her own mentor, Frederica, was a Cranberry supporter.
Her ability allows her to create a cyber world in which she is all-powerful, capable of making anything she thinks of real.

Fal (ファル, Faru)
Voiced by: Mika Kanai
Snow White's mascot character. Though initially Keek's mascot in RESTART, their relationship was bad, and he eventually reported her to the Magical Kingdom after it became clear that her "re-selection" was a death game. Taken in by Snow White afterward, by JOKERS, he has grown to care for her, constantly worrying about her well-being. At the end of QUEENS, Frederica shuts his system down and sends him into space to kill him, but he survives and makes contact with Princess Deluge at the end of RED.

== Magical Girl Raising Project: Limited ==
7753 (ななこさん, Nanakosan) / Kotori Nanaya (七谷小鳥, Nanaya Kotori)
A Magical Girl employed by the Magical Kingdom's Magical Girl Resources Department. Her magical girl outfit resembles a male middle school student's uniform. In LIMITED, she is forced to join an Investigation Team sent to arrest a Rogue Magical Girl hiding amongst the Namiyama Magical Girls. She survives LIMITED and adopts fellow survivor Tepsekemei, unaware that her superior, Pfle, used her as a spy. In breakdown, she accompanies Mana to the late mage Sataborn's private island for inheritance talks and survives the subsequent incident, but ends up fused with a tree, though she is returned to normal at the end of RED.
Her ability lies in her goggles, which can scan anything she sees for information. Shadow Gale has also upgraded the goggles, allowing her to send data directly to Pfle and vice versa.

Mana (マナ, Mana)
A mage and a rookie member of the Magical Kingdom's Inspection Department. She dresses as a witch. In Limited, she leads an Investigation Team sent to arrest a Rogue Magical Girl hiding amongst the Namiyama Magical Girls. She survives the incident and befriends fellow survivors 7753 and Tepsekemei, leading her to invite them to accompany her to Sataborn's island in breakdown when she becomes a candidate for the late mage's inheritance; she once again survives the subsequent incident. In QUEENS, she gets dragged into the war against Puk's Faction, being used by Pfle to create a casus belli. In WHITE and RED, she cooperates with Snow White and Uluru to investigate the Magical Girl Class.
Being a mage rather than a Magical Girl, she has no ability but can cast a variety of spells and owns various magic items.

Tepsekemei (テプセケメイ, Tepusekemei)
One of the Namiyama Magical Girls, a group of middle schoolers transformed by Toko and tricked into fighting the Investigation Team sent to apprehend the fairy's Rogue Magical Girl master; she is the pet turtle of the school science lab, gaining human form as a magical girl. Her magical girl form resembles a genie. She survives LIMITED and gets adopted by 7753. In breakdown, she accompanies Mana and 7753 to the late mage Sataborn's private island for an inheritance meeting and survives the subsequent incident. In WHITE, it is revealed that Snow White recruited her to hunt down Frederica, and she survives the attack on the Magical Girl Class in RED.
Her ability is to transform into air, allowing her to fly, clone herself, generate wind, be invulnerable to physical attacks, and regenerate injuries.

Pythie Frederica (ピティ・フレデリカ, Piti furederika) / Yoshioka (吉岡, Yoshioka)
An overarching antagonist. Her Magical Girl outfit resembles a fortune teller. Following Snow White's selection exam, she became her new mentor, eventually becoming obsessed with her, only to be arrested by her protege after being ousted as a supporter of Cranberry. In Limited, Pfle releases her from prison in return for her silencing a Rogue Magical Girl hiding amongst the Namiyama Magical Girls, a task for which she assembled a group of criminals. She survives LIMITED and abducts Ripple before going on to manipulate the events of JOKERS and ACES from the shadows. In QUEENS, she has joined Caspar's Faction and has taken complete control of it by BLACK. In WHITE, she attacks the Magical Girl Class to acquire the relic from the ruins underneath the school and achieve immortality. She is the eleventh character to die in RED, disintegrated by the magical energy from the relic after Snow White destroys it.
Her ability lets her observe people through her crystal ball and open magical portals to them as long as she holds a strand of her target's hair. She later also takes possession of Pukin's sword.

Captain Grace (キャプテン・グレース, Kyaputen Gurēsu) / Umi Shibahara (芝原海, Shihabara Umi)
One of the Namiyama Magical Girls, a group of middle schoolers transformed by Toko and tricked into fighting the Investigation Team sent to arrest the fairy's Rogue Magical Girl master; she is a second-year student who dreams of going on adventures. However, she has unknowingly become the school's biggest delinquent by beating up anyone who makes fun of her dream. Her magical girl outfit resembles a pirate captain. She is the first character to die, killed by Sonia Bean.
Her ability allows her to summon a magical pirate ship, complete with a cannon to use as a weapon. She also possesses a magical cutlass which she can use as a melee weapon.

Sonia Bean (ソニア・ビーン, Sonia bīn)
One of the criminals, convicts released by Pfle in return for silencing the Rogue Magical Girl hiding amongst the Namiyama Magical Girls; she and her partner, Pukin, are the most infamous Rogue Magical Girls in England's history, being former Magical Kingdom investigators who rose through the ranks by arresting people on false charges and then erasing evidence to the contrary. She wears a patchwork dress as her magical girl outfit. She is the second character to die, killed by Archfiend Pam.
Her ability allows her to disintegrate everything she makes contact with.

Archfiend Pam (魔王パム, Maou Pamu)
A member of the Investigation Team, a group sent to arrest the Rogue Magical Girl hiding amongst the Namiyama Magical Girls, who is originally from the Magical Kingdom's Department of Diplomacy. She is the Magical Kingdom's strongest Magical Girl and heads an institution that teaches Magical Girls to fight, with even Cranberry having once studied under her. Her magical girl attire is a dark, very revealing, swimsuit-like outfit. She is the third character to die, stabbed in the back by Rain Pow while fighting the criminals.
Her ability allows her to manipulate her four wings in any way that she wants, even being capable of changing them into living creatures and producing a variety of elemental attacks.

Tot Pop (トットポップ, Tottopoppu) / Jessica Praise (ジェシカ・プレイズ, Jeshika pureizu)
One of the criminals, convicts released by Pfle in return for silencing the Rogue Magical Girl hiding amongst the Namiyama Magical Girls; she is Frederica's apprentice and the one initially sent by Pfle to break out the other criminals. Her magical girl outfit resembles a rock star. She is the fourth character to die, killed by Rain Pow.
Her ability allows her to materialize music notes using her guitar, which she can use as projectiles.

Hana Gekokujou (下克上羽菜, Gekokujou Hana)
A member of the Investigation Team, a group sent to arrest the Rogue Magical Girl hiding amongst the Namiyama Magical Girls, who is originally from the Magical Kingdom's Inspection Department; Mana's partner and adoptive sister, she is generally a gentle and calm person, though she is willing to become violent if the situation demands it. In her magical girl form, she wears a Japanese kimono and has rabbit ears. She is the fifth character to die, succumbing to wounds she sustained while fighting Pukin.
Her ability allows her to enhance her and others' senses. However, they will undergo a sensory overload if she takes it too far.

Toko (トコ, Toko)
A fairy; she is the one who turned the Namiyama Middle School students into Magical Girls and tricked them into fighting the Investigation Team sent to arrest her Rogue Magical Girl master. She is the sixth character to die, killed by a brainwashed Rain Pow.

Postarie (ポスタリィ, Posutaryi) / Tatsuko Sakaki (酒己達子, Sakaki Tatsuko)
One of the Namiyama Magical Girls, a group of middle schoolers transformed by Toko and tricked into fighting the Investigation Team sent to arrest the fairy's Rogue Magical Girl master; she is a shy first-year student whose only friend is Rain Pow. Her magical girl outfit resembles a mailman. Even after Rain Pow is revealed to be the Rogue Magical Girl chased by the Investigation Team and criminals, she remains loyal to her perceived friend. She is the seventh character to die, killed by a brainwashed Rain Pow.
Her ability allows her to give an object she touches wings that return it to its owner, which she can use offensively by having the object fly at supersonic speed.

Rain Pow (レイン・ポゥ, Rein Pou) / Kaori Ninotsugi (三香織, Ninotsugi Kaori)
One of the Namiyama Magical Girls, a group of middle schoolers transformed by Toko and tricked into fighting the Investigation Team sent to arrest the fairy's Rogue Magical Girl master; she is a first-year student and Postarie's only friend. Her magical girl outfit is a colorful leather suit. She is eventually revealed to be the Rogue Magical Girl chased by the investigation team and criminals, and later gets brainwashed by Pukin. She is both the eighth and ninth character to die, killed, crashing into a barrier placed around the city by the Magical Kingdom. It is later revealed that she was working for Pfle, who sent the criminals to silence her to prevent her own criminal activities from being exposed.
Her ability allows her to make rainbow bridges, which she later reveals can be used as retractable blades and shields.

Weddin (ウェディン, Wedin) / Mine Musubiya (結屋美祢, Musubiya Mine)
Leader of the Namiyama Magical Girls, a group of middle schoolers transformed by Toko and tricked into fighting the Investigation Team sent to arrest the fairy's Rogue Magical Girl master; she is a second-year honors student and a secret Magical Girls fan. Her magical girl outfit resembles a wedding dress. Though initially only a Magical Girl for selfish reasons, she ultimately develops a sense of justice, allying her forces with the Investigation Team and Frederica to stop the rampaging Pukin. She is both the eighth and ninth character to die, crashing into a barrier placed around the city by the Magical Kingdom after being tricked by Frederica.
Her ability makes it impossible for others to break a promise they make with her.

Funny Trick (ファニートリック, Fanītorikku) / Kayo Nemura (根村佳代, Nemura Kayo)
One of the Namiyama Magical Girls, a group of middle schoolers transformed by Toko and tricked into fighting the Investigation Team sent to arrest the fairy's Rogue Magical Girl master; A second-year student publicly known as Grace's best friend, she secretly hates getting dragged around by the latter. Her magical girl outfit resembles a stage magician. Despite their differences, she is furious when Grace is killed and agrees to work with her teammates, the Investigation Team, and Frederica to avenge her. She is both the tenth and eleventh character to die, succumbing to wounds she sustained while fighting Pukin.
Her ability allows her to make two hidden objects switch places through teleportation. However, she is unable to use it on herself.

Kuru-Kuru Hime (繰々姫, Kurukuru Hime) / Nozomi Himeno (姫野希, Himeno Nozomi)
One of the Namiyama Magical Girls, a group of middle schoolers transformed by Toko and tricked into fighting the Investigation Team sent to arrest the fairy's Rogue Magical Girl master; she is the group's teacher, infamously nicknamed "monster" due to having a baby face. As a Magical Girl, she is a young girl in a ballerina outfit. Being suspicious of the situation from the beginning, she defects to the Investigation Team upon learning the truth, and later, after Pukin kills her father, agrees to work with her comrades, the Investigation Team, and Frederica to avenge him. She is both the tenth and eleventh character to die, succumbing to wounds she sustained while fighting Pukin.
Her ability allows her to telekinetically manipulate the ribbons that her magical girl outfit is composed of.

Pukin (プキン, Pukin)
The primary antagonist of Limited; she is one of the criminals, convicts released by Pfle in return for silencing the Rogue Magical Girl hiding amongst the Namiyama Magical Girls. She and her partner, Sonia, are the most infamous Rogue Magical Girls in England's history, being former Magical Kingdom investigators who rose through the ranks by arresting people on false charges and then erasing evidence to the contrary. Her Magical Girl outfit resembles a Musketeer. Though initially manipulated by Frederica, she turns on her and goes on a rampage after snapping following Sonia's death. She is the twelfth and final character to die, having her entire body blown up from the inside by Tepsekemei.
Her ability lies in her sword, which can brainwash, inject information into, suppress senses, and seal memories of those she cuts, though she can only use it on one person at a time.

== Magical Girl Raising Project: JOKERS ==
Princess Deluge (プリンセス・デリュージ, Purinsesu Deryūji) / Nami Aoki (青木奈美, Aoki Nami)
One of the Pure Elements, a group of civilians transformed into magical girls to supposedly protect S-City from otherworldly monsters, unaware that Pfle and Lapis Lazuline I are using them to create "artificial magical girls"; she is a popular middle school student. Her magical girl attire is a swimsuit-like outfit with shell decorations. While initially fooled by the cover story, she begins to realize the truth upon meeting Prism Cherry. Although surviving JOKERS, she is broken by the arc's events and the revelation of her true nature, resulting in her becoming the leader of a gang of Rogue Magical Girls in ACES to avenge her comrades. However, she gives up on revenge following QUEENS after discovering that Lazuline I was manipulating her again. As a result, in BLACK, WHITE, and RED, she studies under Snow White on how to be a "proper magical girl".
Her ability allows her to create and manipulate water and ice. She also owns a magical trident which she uses as her primary weapon.

Marika Fukuroi (袋井魔梨華, Fukuroi Marika) / Mariko Fukuroi (袋井真理子, Fukuroi Mariko)
A former student of Archfiend Pam who got expelled for violence; though normally an intellectual woman, she loses all self-control as a magical girl and picks fights with everyone she encounters. As a magical girl, she is part-plant. She travels to S-City upon learning about the "artificial magical girls" from an anonymous message from Pfle and Frederica, hoping to find strong opponents to fight. She survives JOKERS and becomes a teacher at Koyuki's school.
Her ability allows her to grow magical flowers on top of her head by consuming seeds, each of which has a different ability. Also, due to her plant physiology, she gets stronger and heals faster when exposed to dirt, water, and/or sunlight.

Lady Proud (レディ・プロウド, Redi Puraudo)
A member of the Magical Kingdom's foreign affairs division who seeks to rise through its ranks. Her appearance resembles a vampire. She travels to S-City after learning about the "artificial magical girls" from an anonymous message from Pfle and Frederica, hoping to take the technology for herself. She is the first magical girl to die, killed by a horde of homunculi.
Her ability allows her to manipulate her own blood and change it into any kind of liquid. She also carries around several small vials of her blood to use as weapons.

Kafuria (カフリア, Kafuria) / Kokoro Kimura (木村心, Kimura Kokoro)
A freelance magical girl who travels to S-City after learning about the "artificial magical girls" from an anonymous message from Pfle and Frederica, which offered a reward for capturing them. Her magical girl attire is a widow's dress, and she has black wings at her waist. During her search, she partners with Uttakatta and Filru. She is the second magical girl to die, going missing and later being revealed to have been abducted by Grim Heart before being killed by the original Shufflin.
Her ability allows her to see who out of a group of people will be the first to die. She can also fly using her wings.

Uttakatta (ウッタカッタ, Uattakatta)
A freelance magical girl who travels to S-City after learning about the "artificial magical girls" from an anonymous message from Pfle and Frederica, which offered a reward for capturing them. Her magical girl attire makes her resemble the Caterpillar from Alice in Wonderland. During her search, she teams up with Kafuria and Filru. She is the third magical girl to die, killed by Shufflin clones.
Her ability allows her to blow huge magical bubbles out of her huge magical straw.

Umbrain (アンブレン, Anburen) / Mitsu Kasayama (嵩山美津, Kasayama Mitsu)
A member of the Magical Kingdom's foreign affairs division; she is Lady Proud's partner and dislikes how the latter constantly coddles her. Her magical girl self is a young girl in a raincoat. She is the fourth magical girl to die, going missing and later being revealed to have been abducted by Grim Heart before being killed by the original Shufflin.
Her ability lies in her umbrella, which can block anything as if it were something soft bumping into it.

Princess Quake (プリンセス・クェイク, Purinsesu Kueiku) / Chiko Saitou (茶藤千子, Saitou Chiko)
Leader of the Pure Elements, a group of civilians transformed into magical girls to supposedly protect S-City from otherworldly monsters, unaware that Pfle and Lapis Lazuline I are using them to create "artificial magical girls"; she is a college student. Her magical girl attire is a revealing outfit with Ancient Egyptian decorations. She is very protective of children, to the point of getting mistaken for a lolicon. She is the fifth magical girl to die, getting captured by Grim Heart before allowing herself to be killed by the original Shufflin in Tempest's place.
Her ability makes her skin harden, making her nearly invulnerable to physical attacks. She also possesses a huge magical hammer that can cause earthquakes.

Princess Inferno (プリンセス・インフェルノ, Purinsesu Inferuno) / Akari Hiyama (緋山朱里, Hiyama Akari)
One of the Pure Elements, a group of civilians transformed into magical girls to supposedly protect S-City from otherworldly monsters, unaware that Pfle and Lapis Lazuline I are using them to create "artificial magical girls"; she is a high school student and a childhood friend of Snow White. Her magical girl attire is a revealing outfit with flame decorations. Throughout the arc, she reunites and rekindles her friendship with Snow White. She is the sixth magical girl to die, dying in Snow White's arms from wounds that she sustained while fighting the original Shufflin.
Her ability allows her to create and manipulate fire. She also possesses a magical Guandao, which shares her ability.

Princess Tempest (プリンセス・テンペスト, Purinsesu Tenpesuto) / Mei Higashionna (東恩納鳴, Higashionna Mei)
One of the Pure Elements, a group of civilians transformed into magical girls to supposedly protect S-City from otherworldly monsters, unaware that Pfle and Lapis Lazuline I are using them to create "artificial magical girls"; she is an elementary school student. Her magical girl self is a teenager wearing a very revealing outfit with leaf decorations. She is the seventh magical girl to die, going missing and later being revealed to have been abducted by Grim Heart before being killed by the Joker Shufflin.
Her ability allows her to manipulate wind. One way that she can use this ability is to fly. She also possesses a magical boomerang.

Styler Mimi (スタイラーミミ, Sutairā Mimi)
A magical girl running a beauty salon who gets dragged to S-City by her best friend, Marika, after the latter learns about the "artificial magical girls" from an anonymous message from Pfle and Frederica. Her magical girl outfit resembles a fashionista. Though acting like she hates Marika, she secretly likes getting into trouble with her. She is the eighth magical girl to die, killed by a Shufflin clone.
Her ability allows her to alter another's appearance. She also possesses a pair of magical scissors, which she uses as her primary weapon.

Prism Cherry (プリズムチェリー, Purizumu Cherī) / Sakura Kagami (加賀美桜, Kagami Sakura)
A normal magical girl who finds herself amidst a conspiracy to create "artificial magical girls" after her classmate, Deluge, discovers her identity and brings her into the Pure Elements; she is a middle schooler. Her magical girl outfit is a reflective dress with cherry decorations. Having always wanted to be "special" like the Princesses, she is conflicted throughout JOKERS whether to tell them the truth. However, when given the option to flee, she ultimately opts to protect her new friends. She is the ninth magical girl to die, succumbing to wounds she sustained fighting Shufflin clones while covering Deluge's escape.
Her ability allows her to manipulate the reflections in mirrors, which she primarily uses by producing light flashes using her reflective outfit to disorient enemies.

Filru (フィルルゥ, Firuruu)
A former Magical Kingdom prison officer who got fired following Limited and travels to S-City after learning about the "artificial magical girls" from an anonymous message from Pfle and Frederica, needing a reward for capturing them due to being broke. Her magical girl outfit is a knitted dress. During her search, she teams up with Kafuria and Uttakatta, but ultimately decides to team up with the Pure Elements and the other magical girls once the threat of Grim Heart and the Shufflins emerges. Ultimately, she realizes that she never wanted a reward and just wanted to feel needed. She is the tenth magical girl to die, killed by a Shufflin clone whilst protecting Deluge.
Her ability allows her to puncture anything using a magical needle and thread. While the nature of her ability makes it so that the needle itself can't be used as a weapon, the thread is durable enough that it can't be broken even by a magical girl.

Grim Heart (グリムハート, Gurimuhāto)
The primary antagonist of JOKERS; a member of the Magical Kingdom's homeland security bureau and later revealed to be the incarnation of Shayta Val Osk Mer, leader of "Osk's Faction" and one of the Three Sages who rule the Kingdom. She resembles the Queen of Hearts from Alice in Wonderland. It was her faction that originally developed the "artificial magical girl" technology, which Pfle and Lapis Lazuline I stole and used to create the Pure Elements; thus, she was sent to capture them and eliminate witnesses. In the end, her plan fails when the other magical girls escape and expose her crimes, resulting in her being killed in a cover-up; she and Shufflin are the final magical girls to die.
Her ability allows her to ignore those she deems "rude", allowing her to nullify attacks, magical abilities, and even sounds aimed at her.

Shufflin (シャッフリン, Shaffurin)
Grim Heart's subordinate; a homunculus turned into a magical girl using the Osk Faction's "artificial magical girl" technology. She resembles the card soldiers from Alice in Wonderland. After Grim Heart's plan failed and her crimes were exposed, she was killed as alongside her superior in a cover-up; she and Grim Heart are the final magical girls to die.
Her consciousness is split between fifty-three bodies modeled after a deck of cards. Each card type has a different ability, ranked from Two to Ace: Spades are strong, Diamonds have high intelligence, Clubs are stealthy, and Hearts are durable. There is also a single Joker who can revive the others by killing a magical girl. In addition, each body is armed with a magical spear and the Joker with a scythe.

== Magical Girl Raising Project: ACES/QUEENS ==
Uluru (うるる, Ururu)
A member of Puk's Faction, one of the three factions ruling the Magical Kingdom; she is the eldest of Puk Puck's protéges, a stubborn and childish girl who idolizes the latter. Her magical girl outfit is reminiscent of The Boy Who Cried Wolf. In ACES, Puk Puck sends her, Snow White, and Sorami Nakano to retrieve Premium Sachiko, but the mission fails when both of her fellow protéges are killed. In QUEENS, she realizes Puk Puck brainwashed her and runs away from Puk's Faction, partnering with Mana to rescue the brainwashed Snow White. She survives QUEENS and cooperates with Snow White in BLACK, WHITE, and RED to bring Frederica, who masterminded her fellow protége's deaths, to justice.
Her ability makes others believe that anything she says is the truth; the only way to break the spell is to realize she is lying.

Blue Bell Candy (ブルーベル・キャンディ, Burūberu kyandi)
A member of the Magical Kingdom's R&D Division who looks after Deluge following JOKERS and follows her on her revenge quest. She wears a candy shop dress as her Magical Girl outfit. A voice of reason, she continually tries to convince Deluge to stop. However, it is revealed in QUEENS that she is actually Lapis Lazuline III (三代目ラピス・ラズリーヌ, Sandaime Rapisu Razurīnu) and had been manipulating Deluge all along, erasing her own memories to sell the act. In BLACK, WHITE, and RED, she works under Old Blue but grows increasingly skeptical of her, ultimately prompting her to partner with Deluge again.
Her ability allows her to make magical candies that can alter the consumer's emotions. It is later revealed that she can also seal away others' emotions, memories, and even magic into these candies.

Dark Cutie (ダークキューティー, Dākukyūtī)
A member of the Magical Girl Resources Department's covert team; she cooperates with Deluge's group under Pfle's orders. Her Magical Girl outfit is a black catsuit. She is a former celebrity who appeared in the in-universe anime Cutie Healer Galaxy as an antagonist, only to be anticlimactically written out of the series, resulting in her constantly role-playing as a villain. She survives ACES and QUEENS and becomes obsessed with Snow White, causing her to stalk the latter.
Her ability allows her to manipulate shadows and silhouettes.

Armor Arlie (アーマー・アーリィ, Āmā Aryi)
A Magical Girl homunculus created from the Magical Kingdom's R&D Division, who gets stolen by Deluge and joins her crew. She wears knight-like armor as her Magical Girl attire. Being technically a newborn, she acts very childlike. She follows Deluge's orders throughout ACES and QUEENS and lives through the arc's events. In Black, WHITE, and RED, she infiltrates Umemizaki Middle School's Group 1 under the alias Arc Arlie with Snow White and survives the attack on the school.
Her ability lies in her armor, which increases her strength the more it is damaged. It can also repair itself.

Blade Brenda (ブレイド・ブレンダ, Bureido Burenda)
A Magical Girl homunculus created from the Magical Kingdom's R&D Division, who gets stolen by Princess Deluge and joins her crew. She wears knight-like armor as her Magical Girl attire. Being technically a newborn, she acts very childlike. She follows Deluge's orders throughout ACES and QUEENS and lives through the arc's events. In Black, WHITE, and RED, she is taught by Snow White how to be a "proper Magical Girl". She is the second character to die in WHITE, killed by Frederica.
Her ability lies in her sword, which can cut through anything.

Cannon Catherine (キャノン・キャサリン, Kyanon Kyasarin)
A Magical Girl homunculus created from the Magical Kingdom's R&D Division, who gets stolen by Princess Deluge and joins her crew. She wears knight-like armor as her Magical Girl attire. Being technically a newborn, she acts very childlike. She follows Deluge's orders throughout ACES and QUEENS and lives through the arc's events. In Black, WHITE, and RED, she is taught by Snow White how to be a "proper Magical Girl". She is the second character to die in WHITE, killed by Frederica.
Her ability lies in her sword, which can cut through anything.

Shufflin II (シャッフリンII, Shaffurin II)
A member of Osk's Faction, one of three factions controlling the Magical Kingdom; she is a new model of the homunculus magical girl Shufflin from JOKERS, acting as the faction's mindless clone army. Her appearance is identical to the original Shufflin, resembling the card soldiers from Alice in Wonderland. Although many clones are destroyed, some survive the events of the arc.
Like the original Shufflin, she can produce a clone army modeled after a deck of cards. However, while individually stronger than the original, she lacks a Joker.

Patricia (パトリシア, Patorishia) / Shia Hattori (服部シア, Hattori Shia)
A mercenary hired by Pfle as Shadow Gale's bodyguard. Her Magical Girl outfit is a police uniform. She is the first Magical Girl to die, killed by Princess Deluge.
Her ability lies in her handcuffs, which can nullify the magic of those it chains.

Sorami Nakano (中野宇宙美, Nakano Sorami)
A member of Puk's Faction, one of three factions controlling the Magical Kingdom; she is the youngest of Puk Puck's protégés, a relaxed girl who often acts as mediator for her fellow protégés. She wears a middle-school uniform as her magical girl attire. She, Uluru, and Snow White are tasked with retrieving Sachiko after she runs away from home. She is the second Magical Girl to die, killed by Dark Cutie.
Her magic allows her to see the contents of sealed things without opening said things.

Micchan the Dictionary (物知りみっちゃん, Monoshiri Mitchan)
The leader of the Magical Girl Resources Department's covert team, who joins Deluge's group under Pfle's orders. Her Magical Girl outfit is a scholar's uniform. Both Dark Cutie and Glassianne respect her as their strategist. She is the third Magical Girl to die, killed by a brainwashed Ripple.
She can change any object in her hands by changing a syllable (ventriloquism works) in the object's name.

Premium Sachiko (プレミアム幸子, Puremiamu Sachiko)
A member of Puk's Faction, one of three factions controlling the Magical Kingdom; she is Puk Puck's second protégé, who ran away from home for fear of harming others with her ability. Her Magical Girl form has accessories associated with good luck. Since she is essential for her faction's plans, Osk's Faction targets her while Puk Puck tasks Snow White, Uluru, and Sorami with retrieving her. She is the fourth magical girl to die, killed by a brainwashed Ripple, though she left behind a magical contract containing her ability for Puk Puck to use.
Her ability allows others to sign a magic contract with her, temporarily making them extraordinarily lucky. However, they will suffer extreme bad luck afterward, which usually results in their deaths.

Glassianne (グラシアーネ, Gurashiāne)
A member of the Magical Girl Resources Department's covert team, who joins Deluge's group under Pfle's orders. Her magical girl outfit makes her resemble a strawberry cake. She works at a cake shop once a month and aspires to get her own anime one day. She is the fifth Magical Girl to die, killed by a brainwashed Shufflin II clone.
Her ability allows her to see any place she visited previously.

Lethe (レーテ, Rēte)
The acting leader of Osk's Faction, one of three factions controlling the Magical Kingdom, following Grim Heart's death in JOKERS; she maintains a pompous, duchess-like demeanor. Her outfit is like a ballgown with dragon horns and a tail. As Puk's Faction's plan is about to commence, she leads an alliance of Osk's Faction, Caspar's Faction, and the Magical Girl Resources Department to stop them. She is the sixth magical girl to die, killed by Puk Puck.
Her ability allows her to manipulate distance. She also owns a magical sword.

CQ Angel Hammer (CQ天使ハムエル, Shikyū Tenshi Hamueru)
A member of Osk's Faction, one of three factions controlling the Magical Kingdom. Her magical girl form resembles an angel with skeletal wings. After Sachiko runs away from Puk's Faction, she is tasked with abducting her to thwart their plans, only to find herself hopelessly out of her depth against Snow White and Deluge's groups. She later serves as Lethe's second-in-command. She is the seventh Magical Girl to die, killed by an unseen assailant.
Her ability lies in her magical microphone, which allows her to communicate with others telepathically.

Puk Puck (プク・プック, Puku Pukku)
The leader of Puk's Faction, one of three factions controlling the Magical Kingdom, and the current incarnation of one of the Three Sages. She has the appearance and personality of a child. Throughout ACES and QUEENS, she plots to use an ancient magical device to fix the Magical Kingdom's current magic shortage. To this end, she tasks Snow White with retrieving Sachiko after she runs away from home, as her magic is vital to her scheme, and brainwashes Shadow Gale to repair the device. She is the eighth Magical Girl to die, killed by the side effect of using Sachiko's magic.
Her ability makes everyone she makes contact with become infatuated with her.

== Magical Girl Raising Project: breakdown ==
- breakdown takes place before ACES/QUEENS in the timeline

=== Touta Camp ===
Touta Magaoka (曲岡統太, Tōta Magaoka)
A young boy raised by his aunt after his parents died in an accident. He only recently learned about the Magical Kingdom, following the revelation that he is a distant relative of the late mage Sataborn; thus making him eligible for his inheritance. His aunt arranges for Miss Marguerite to accompany him to Sataborn's private island for a meeting with the other inheritance candidates. He survives breakdown.
Being an ordinary person, he has no magic whatsoever. However, he later takes possession of Clarissa Toothedge's magical sword, which he uses to land the final blow to Francisca Francesca.

Miss Marguerite (ミス・マーガリート, Misu Maagariito) / Kaoruko Rokugou (麓郷薫子, Fumoto Gō Kaoruko)
A former instructor for the Magical Kingdom's Inspection Department who resigned after one of her students was killed in action. Her Magical Girl outfit is a French dress. She accompanies Touta to the late mage Sataborn's private island for an inheritance meeting at the request of his aunt, her former colleague, during which she educates him about the Magical Kingdom. She is the seventh and final character to die, killed by Francisca Francesca while using herself as a distraction so Touta could land a surprise attack.
Her ability allows her to bend straight objects she comes in contact with. She also owns a magical rapier which she uses as her primary weapon.

=== Shepherdspie Camp ===
Dreamy☆Chelsea (ドリーミィ☆チェルシー, Doriimyi ☆ Cherushii) / Chie Yumeno (夢野千枝, Yumeno Chie)
A 32-year-old hikikomori from a family of Magical Girls. She dons typical Magical Girl attire with star decorations. Despite wishing to focus solely on community service as a Magical Girl, she is forced by her mother to get a job, leading her to get hired by Shepherdspie as a housemaid for the inheritance meeting. Following her employer's death at the hands of Francisca Francesca, she becomes hellbent on avenging him. She survives breakdown.
Her ability allows her to manipulate star-shaped objects telekinetically.

Pastel Mary (パステルメリー, Pasuterumerii) / Yoh Tanada (棚田曜, Tanada Yoh)
Sheperdspie's housemaid. She is rather clumsy and desperate to keep her job after previously failing as an artist and a selection exam overseer. Her Magical Girl outfit combines elements of an artist and a shepherd. Following the revelation that people must consume magic fruits to maintain their powers on Sataborn's island, she is brainwashed by Love Me Ren-Ren into stealing all of said fruits. Her brainwashing later gets undone during the chaos caused by Francisca Francesca. She survives breakdown but somehow ends up possessing Francisca's body.
Her ability allows her to materialize sheep that she draws in her sketchbook.

John Shepherdspie (ジョン・シェパーズパイ, Jon Shepāzupai)
The cousin of the late mage Sataborn. Per his deceased uncle's will, he invites the other inheritance candidates to his relative's private island to discuss collateral distribution. Unlike his uncle, he is a humble man whose only passion is cooking. He is the second character to die, killed by Francisca Francesca when he accidentally stumbles upon her.
Being a mage rather than a Magical Girl, he has no ability, and even his spellcasting has been noted to be mediocre.

=== Ragi Camp ===
Ragi Zwe Nento (ラギ·ヅェ·ネント)
An elderly and grumpy mage who heads the Magical Girl Management Division. He first made a minor appearance in RESTART, where he refused to aid Snow White in stopping Keek's re-selection. In breakdown, he is a candidate for the late mage Sataborn's inheritance, traveling to the latter's private island to meet the other inheritors and hiring Clantail to accompany him. He survives breakdown and starts being less rigid after learning that his refusal to cooperate with Snow White led to the deaths of Clantail's comrades. In WHITE and RED, he is once again approached by Snow White during her investigation of the Magical Girl Class and chooses to aid her this time.
Being a mage rather than a Magical Girl, he has no ability but can cast a variety of spells.

=== Agri Camp ===
Nephilia (ネフィーリア, Nefiiria) / Iria Funada (Funada Iria)
A high schooler who likes "weird" and "nasty" things and works freelance. Her Magical Girl attire resembles a grim reaper. Agri hires her to accompany her to the late mage Sataborn's private island for inheritance talks and she aids her employer's schemes simply for entertainment. She survives breakdown but now constantly sees hallucinations of Love Me Ren-Ren due to having been struck by one of the latter's arrows, though she does not mind this.
Her ability allows her to recall everything a deceased person whose corpse she touches said before their death. She also owns a magical scythe which she uses as her primary weapon.

Agrielreymwaed Quarky (アグリイェルレイムエイド·クォーキ, Aguriierureimueido·Kuōki)
Usually referred to as Agri (アグリイ, Agurii); she is the illegitimate daughter of the late mage Sataborn and a candidate for his inheritance, hiring Love Me Ren-Ren and Nephilia to accompany her to her estranged father's private island to meet the other inheritors. Wishing for wealth after growing up in poverty, following the revelation that mages and Magical Girls must consume magic fruits to maintain their powers on the island, she hatches a scheme to extort the others by stealing all the fruit for herself. She is the third character to die upon getting caught in one of Francisca Francesca's rampages.
Being a mage rather than a Magical Girl, she has no ability but can cast a variety of spells, specializing in forging magic contracts that force signers to follow through on their terms.

Love Me Ren-Ren (らぶみー恋々, Rabumi ̄Renren) / Rei Koimizu (乞水怜, Koimizu Rei)
A high schooler who is obsessed with love and works freelance. Her Magical Girl form resembles a cupid. Agri hires her to accompany her to the late mage Sataborn's private island for inheritance talks. Along the way, she grows dangerously attached to her employer, willing to do whatever she says. It is later implied that she killed her own mother in retaliation for being abused but could not come to terms with her actions, causing her to view Agri as a surrogate. Following Agri's death, her mental state degrades, growing delusional. She is the sixth character to die, killed by Francisca Francesca while using herself as a human shield to protect Clantail.
She owns a magical bow and arrows, which she uses as her primary weapon. Her ability makes everyone hit by her arrows fall in love with the person struck before them; if no one was shot before, they fall in love with her.

=== Navi Camp ===
Navi Ru (ナヴィ・ル, Navi Ru)
The late mage Sataborn's former apprentice who is now a candidate for his master's inheritance. He travels to his mentor's private island with his partner, Clarissa Toothedge, to meet the other inheritors, aiming for the rights to his master's research. It is later revealed that he masterminded the events of breakdown to kill Maiya, who was opposed to his betrothal with Yol, and to steal a magic item from the inheritance collateral that he believes can cure his comatose sister. He survives breakdown but Nephilia and Ragi learn of his crimes and, with there being no incriminating evidence, brainwash him using Love Me Ren-Ren's ability as retribution.
Being a mage rather than a Magical Girl, he has no ability but can cast a variety of spells and owns various magic items.

Clarissa Toothedge (クラリッサ・トゥースエッジ, Kurarissa Tūsuejji) / Lu (ルー, Rū)
Navi Ru's cousin and partner who accompanies him to the late mage Sataborn's private island for inheritance talks. In her Magical Girl form, she has cat ears and a tail. Though presented as cheerful and jolly, she is actually rather devious. It is later revealed that she helped Navi orchestrate the events of breakdown to steal an item from the inheritance collateral which he believes could cure her comatose mother. She is the fifth character to die, killed by Francisca Francesca while attempting to silence her out-of-control ally.
Her ability allows her to know the location of any object she bites. Navi also gave her a magical sword that is highly effective against artificial beings.

=== Yol Camp ===
Yol (イオール, Iōru)
A young girl who is the heiress-in-waiting to a wealthy family of mages and a candidate for the inheritance of the late mage Sataborn, traveling to the latter's private island with her maids, Maiya and Rareko, to meet the other inheritors. She is also Navi Ru's former fiancé after their betrothal was canceled due to complaints over their age difference. Unbeknownst to her, she is not an actual inheritance candidate but was added to Sataborn's will post-mortem by Navi to lure out Maiya and Rareko. She survives breakdown.
Being a mage rather than a Magical Girl, she has no ability but can cast various spells and owns a variety of magic talismans.

Maiya (マイヤ, Maiyā) / Maya Mutou (武藤麻耶, Mutō Maya)
Rareko's mentor and a maid serving Yol's family, where she enjoys authority atypical for a mere servant. In her Magical Girl form, she dons a robe resembling a mage's and a mask that covers half her face. She accompanies Yol to the late mage Sataborn's private island alongside Rareko for an inheritance meeting. She is the first character to die, killed by Francisca Francesca; it is later revealed that the meeting was a trap set by Navi Ru to assassinate her over her opposition to his betrothal to Yol.
She owns a magical staff, which she uses as her primary weapon, and her ability causes said staff to deal more damage depending on how often the person struck by it has lied in their lives.

Rareko (られ子, Rareko) / Arare Mutou (武藤霞, Mutō Arare)
An orphan raised as Maiya's disciple and a maid serving Yol's family. While maintaining a stoic disposition, she is actually a two-faced person who is ungrateful for what she has been given. Her Magical Girl outfit resembles a mage's robe. She accompanies Yol to the late mage Sataborn's private island alongside Maiya for an inheritance meeting. It is later revealed that she has been cooperating with Navi Ru and Clarissa Toothedge. However, they turn on her once her role in their plans is complete. She is the fourth character to die, killed by Francisca Francesca upon crossing paths with her while fleeing Clarissa.
Her ability allows her to repair anything provided she has the necessary materials. She also owns a magical staff, which she uses as her primary weapon.

=== Others ===
Francisca Francesca (フランキスカ・フランチェスカ, Furankisuka Furanchesuka)
The primary antagonist of breakdown; a mysterious Magical Girl running amok on the late mage Sataborn's private island, attacking anyone she encounters. She resembles the Goddess of Spring from "The Honest Woodcutter". She is later revealed to be an artificial being created by Sataborn who Navi Ru intended to use to kill Maiya, but he lost control. In the end, after being severely injured from consecutive fights, her body ends up being taken over by Pastel Mary, effectively erasing her persona.
She owns two magical axes, which she uses as her primary weapons, and her ability allows her to alter their properties, capable of transforming them into anything. She can also copy others' fighting styles. However, her senses are unfinished, forcing her to see through magic detection.

Lyr Cuem Sataborn (リル·クェム·サタボーン, Riru· Kuemu· Satabōn)
A distinguished yet antisocial mage whose death set the events of breakdown into motion, as several inheritance candidates are invited to his private island with their magical girl associates to discuss collateral distribution but are caught in an incident caused by the results of his experiments.
Being a mage rather than a Magical Girl, he had no ability but could cast a variety of spells, being known for inventing many original magics.

== Magical Girl Raising Project: BLACK/WHITE/RED ==
WHITE is a direct continuation of BLACK and RED, while it’s a direct continuation of WHITE.

Mephis Pheles (メピス・フェレス, Mepisu Feresu) / Fuuko Sayama (佐山楓子ー, Sayama Fuko)
A temperamental student of the Magical Girl Class and the leader of Group 2, which has secretly been tasked with excavating the ruins underneath the school by Frederica; she becomes Kana's roommate after the latter transfers into the class. She is also Tetty Goodgrip's former childhood friend, after they fell out. Her Magical Girl form resembles a devil; her name being a play on Mephistopheles. In WHITE, it is later revealed that she had been brainwashed and fused with a homunculus clone by the principal. In RED, Kana undoes her brainwashing, and she turns on Frederica by helping Snow White destroy the relic she seeks. She survives RED.
Her ability allows her to influence others by whispering to them.

Rappy Taype (ラッピー・ティップ, Rappī Tippu) / Rumi Itadakita (頂田ルミ, Itadakita Rumi)
A student of the Magical Girl Class recommended by the Magical Girl Resources Department and a member of Group 1, which Snow White and Arlie join for their infiltration of the class; she is actually an adult pretending to be a middle schooler spying on the class. Her Magical Girl outfit is composed of aluminum foil. In WHITE, she begins working under Snow White after the latter strikes a deal with her superiors. When the school is attacked in RED, she is captured by Old Blue's forces but survives and is returned to the Resources Department following a deal between them and her superiors.
Her ability allows her to telekinetically control the foil her Magical Girl outfit is composed of.

Miss Ril (ミス・リール, Misu Rīru) / Satoko Kanegafuchi (鐘ヶ淵聡子, Kanegafuchi Satoko)
A student of the Magical Girl Class and a member of Group 1, which Snow White and Arlie join for their infiltration of the class; she is a social person who gets along with everyone. In her Magical Girl form, her entire body is made of metal; her name likely being a pun on the fictional metal Mithril. When the school is attacked, she is saved by and befriends 0 Lulu, causing her to survive RED.
Her ability allows her to change her body to any metallic material she comes in contact with.

Drill Dory (ドリル・ドリィ, Doriru Dorii)
A student of the Magical Girl Class and a member of Group 1, which Snow White and Arlie join for their infiltration of the class; she is an Artificial Magical Girl homunculus from the same model as Arlie, causing them to look identical and often be mistaken for twins. Being the latest model, she views herself as superior to other Artificial Magical Girls and constantly picks on Arlie. In her Magical Girl form, her right hand turns into a drill. She survives RED.
Her ability lies in her magical drill, which can continue spinning endlessly.

Sally Raven (サリー・レイヴン, Sarii Reivun) / Risa Karasuno (鳥野理沙, Karasuno Risa)
A student of the Magical Girl Class and a member of Group 3, which, unbeknownst to her, has secretly been tasked with sabotaging Group 2 by Old Blue; she is a huge fan of the in-universe magical girl anime Cutie Healer and hopes to be a part of it someday. Her Magical Girl outfit is a black dress, with her name being a reference to Sally the Witch. She survives RED and gets a job working on a new Magical Girl anime.
Her ability allows her to create magical ravens that do her bidding.

Calkoro (カルコロ, Karukoro) / Calkoro Culumff (カルコロ・クルンフ, Karukoro Kurunfu)
The homeroom teacher of the Magical Girl Class; she is admittedly mediocre at her job, having been hired solely for being both a mage and a Magical Girl. Her Magical Girl form resembles a mouse. While having self-esteem issues, she genuinely cares for her students, coming to their aid when they are in danger and ultimately even standing up to her superiors. She survives RED and gets a new job under Ragi.
Her ability allows her to make 100% accurate calculations using her magical abacus. Being a mage, she can also cast a variety of spells.

0 Lulu (０ラブ・ルールー, Rabu Rūrū)
One of Old Blue's apprentices; sold by her parents as a child, she is an initially forlorn and indifferent person until she gets tasked with assassinating Frederica in WHITE alongside Ripple, with whom she slowly bonds, agreeing to infiltrate the Magical Girl Class in RED to protect Snow White for her. Her Magical Girl attire resembles a Chinese Opera dress. She survives RED but, having effectively betrayed her comrades, she becomes a fugitive.
Her ability centers around gemstones, gaining a different power depending on what stone she holds.

Princess Lighting (プリンセス・ライトニング, Purinsesu Raitoningu) / Ai Tanaka (田中愛染, Tanaka Ai)
A student of the Magical Girl Class and the leader of Group 3, which has been secretly tasked with sabotaging Group 2 by Old Blue; she is a secret apprentice of Old Blue who infiltrated the school without the knowledge of the latter's other apprentices. Her Magical Girl attire is a revealing leather suit. Usually enigmatic, her personality seemingly changes in WHITE, becoming enthusiastic and gluttonous. This is later revealed to stem from her being a mass-produced Artificial Magical Girl homunculus; the Lightnings from BLACK and WHITE are different people. In RED, the school is attacked by an army of Lightning clones, many of whom die, though the one from WHITE survives.
Her ability is electrokinetics, and she possesses a magical sword. She also possesses forty clone bodies modeled after a deck of cards.

Ranyi (クミクミ, Ranyuui) / Saho Suzui (鈴井沙穂, Suzui Saho)
A student of the Magical Girl Class and a member of Group 3, which has secretly been tasked with sabotaging Group 2 by Old Blue; possessing severe self-esteem issues, she and Diko are actually apprentices of Old Blue sent to spy on the class. Her Magical Girl attire is a swimsuit-like outfit that resembles fish gills. She is the first character to die, succumbing to wounds she sustained when Frederica's forces attacked the school, though not before she transports Old Blue and her army to the school using her ability.
Her ability allows her to create a magical portal between an entrance and an exit.

Thunder-General Adelheid (雷将アーデルハイト, Raishou Aaderuhaito) / Adelheid Muller (アーデルハイト・ミュラー, Āderuhaitomyurā)
A student of the Magical Girl Class and a member of Group 2, which has been secretly tasked with excavating the ruins underneath the school by Frederica; she is one of Archfiend Pam's former students. Her Magical Girl attire is a military uniform. She develops a rivalry with fellow electricity-themed Magical Girl Princess Lighting, which eventually becomes a friendship. She is the fourth character to die, succumbing to wounds she sustained fighting Lightning's strongest clone.
Her ability allows her to absorb energy and unleash it toward her targets. She also owns a magical saber.

Pshuke Prains (プシュケ・プレインス, Pushuke Pureinsu) / China Mizuta (水田稚奈, Mizuta China)
A student of the Magical Girl Class and a member of Group 3, which, unbeknownst to her, has been secretly tasked with sabotaging Group 2 by Old Blue; formerly a member of Puk's Faction, she is constantly in a bad mood and worried for her future career prospects following their dissolution in QUEENS. Her Magical Girl outfit is a swimsuit. In RED, she is revealed to have been brainwashed and fused with a homunculus clone by the principal, being made to defend the school when it comes under attack. She is the fifth character to die, killed by Old Blue.
Her ability lies in her magical water gun, which can shoot out any liquid.

Diko Narakunoin (奈落野院出ィ子, Narakunoindiko) / Hitomi Gotou (後藤瞳, Gotou Hitomi)
A student of the Magical Girl Class and a member of Group 3, which has been secretly tasked with sabotaging Group 2 by Old Blue; often mistaken for a delinquent due to her mohawk hairstyle, she and Ranyi are actually apprentices of Old Blue sent to spy on the class. Her Magical Girl outfit is a large blue coat. In WHITE, she is abducted by Miss Satou before being brainwashed and fused with a homunculus clone by the principal, being made to defend the school when it is attacked in RED. She is both the sixth and seventh character to die, killed by Old Blue.
Her ability allows her to vanish from existence temporarily.

Miss Satou (佐藤さん, Satō-san)
The gardener who tends to the Magical Girl Class's courtyard; she is a mysterious individual who does not exist in the school's files. Tetty bonds with her and occasionally asks for her advice. In WHITE, she is revealed to actually be a clone of Cranberry guarding the ruins underneath the school. When the school is attacked in RED, she is ordered by the principal to defend it. She is both the sixth and seventh character to die, killed by Old Blue.
Being a copy of Cranberry, she possesses the former's sonokinesis.

Old Blue (オールド・ブルー, Ōrudo burū) / Lapis Lazuline I (初代ラピス・ラズリーヌ, Shodai Rapisu Razurīnu)
An overarching antagonist; she is a survivor of Cranberry's exams and Lapis Lazuline, Bluebell Candy, Ranyi, Diko, Lightning, and 0 Lulu's mentor. Her Magical Girl outfit is a flower-adorned blue dress. First mentioned in RESTART, it's later revealed that she began working with Pfle to overthrow the Magical Kingdom following the arc's events. She seemingly debuted in ACES, cooperating with Frederica to thwart Puk's Faction's plans. However, in QUEENS, it is revealed that she had already appeared before, her being the mysterious "Ms. Tanaka" who turned the Pure Elements into Artificial Magical Girls in JOKERS. By BLACK, she has taken over the Magical Kingdom's R&D Division and comes into conflict with Frederica, attacking the Magical Girl Class in RED to prevent the latter from acquiring the relic from the ruins underneath the school. She is the eighth character to die, killed by Frederica.
Her ability lets her "see the true nature of things".

Classical Lillian (クラシカル・リリアン, Kurashikaru Ririan) / Chikage Miki (三木千景, Miki Chikage)
A student of the Magical Girl Class and a member of Group 2, which has been secretly tasked with excavating the ruins underneath the school by Frederica; her personality and appearance as a human and Magical Girl are completely different, the former being very gloomy and monotone, whereas the latter is cheerful and colorful. In WHITE, she revealed to have been brainwashed and fused with a homunculus clone by the principal, being made to defend the school when it is attacked. In RED, she and Kumi-Kumi are sent to excavate the ruins, only for said ruins to assimilate them; she is both the ninth and tenth character to die.
Her ability allows her to spin an indestructible magical threat that can be used to create various contraptions.

Kumi-Kumi (クミクミ, Kumikumi) / Kumiko Tateno (立野玖美子, Tateno Kumiko)
A student of the Magical Girl Class and a member of Group 2, which has been secretly tasked with excavating the ruins underneath the school by Frederica; she is a kind person who tends to overthink things. Her Magical Girl attire is a miner's uniform. In WHITE, she is revealed to have been brainwashed and fused with a homunculus clone by the principal during BLACK, being made to defend the school when it is attacked. In RED, she and Lillian are sent to excavate the ruins, only for said ruins to assimilate them; she is both the ninth and tenth character to die.
Her ability allows her to create anything, provided she has the materials. She also owns a magical pickaxe.

Halna Midi Meren (ハルナ・ミディ・メレン, Haruna Midi Meren)
The principal of the Magical Girl Class. A strict woman with high standards, she is a critic of the Magical Kingdom's "quantity-over-quality" policy regarding magical girls and founded the class to guide them onto the right path. She is later revealed to be the culprit who abducted several students and turned them into homunculi, using them as an army to defend the school when Frederica and Old Blue attack it. However, Kana ultimately subdues her, and she gets forced to cooperate with the others to fight off the invaders. She is the eleventh character to die, succumbing to wounds she sustained while fighting Frederica.
Being a mage rather than a Magical Girl, she has no ability but can cast a variety of spells.

Tetty Goodgripp (テティ・グットニーギル, Teti Guttonīgiru) / Fujino Tohyama (遠山藤乃, Tohyama Fujino)
The class representative of the Magical Girl Class and the leader of Group 1, which Snow White and Arlie join for their infiltration of the class; and the class representative recommended to the Magical Girl Class by the Information Bureau; she is a responsible girl with strong morals. She is also Mephis's former childhood friend, after they had a falling out. Her Magical Girl attire is a baker's uniform. She reconciles with Mephis in WHITE, only for it to be revealed that she had been brainwashed and fused with a homunculus clone by the principal, being made to defend the school when it comes under attack. In RED, Kana undoes her brainwashing, and she helps Snow White destroy the relic that Frederica seeks. She is the twelfth character to die, killed by Frederica.
Her ability lies in her magic mittens, which give the wearer super strength.

Kana (カナ, Kana)
An alleged convict who transfers to the Magical Girl Class and joins Group 2 as part of a rehabilitation program; she is a socially awkward person who lacks common sense. She wears the school uniform and remains in her Magical Girl form at all times. In WHITE, she is revealed to actually be Ratsumukana-honome-no-kami (ラツムカナホノメノカミ), the incarnation of one of the Three Sages, having been brainwashed by Frederica. She is the fourteenth and final character to die, sacrificing herself to hold back the magic unleashed after the relic underneath the school is destroyed.
Her ability allows her to know the answer to any question she asks. She is also a mage, allowing her to cast a variety of spells. In addition, she is gifted a magical iron ball and chain by Mephis.

== Minor characters ==
Sumire (すみれ)
One of Koyuki's friends from school. Unlike Yoshiko, Sumire is more willing to accept the existence of Magical Girls.

Yoshiko Yoshinoura (吉乃浦芳子)
One of Koyuki's friends from school. She has grown aware of there being another side to Koyuki that she isn't showing in BLACK.

Juube (ジューベ) / Misa Natsume (なつめ・みさ)
The new head of the Magical Girl Resources Department following Pfle's death. In WHITE, she aids Snow White's investigation of the Magical Girls Class by lending her subordinate, Rappy Taype, to thwart Pythie Frederica and Old Blue's goals. Her ability allows her to use a magical pen to write any sentence, and after 24 hours, the sentence will turn blue if it is a true statement or red if it is false.
