= Brookhaven, Fresno, California =

Neighborhood in Fresno, California

Coordinates: 36.7037°N 119.7975°W

Location of Fresno in Fresno County, California. Brookhaven is located in Southwest Fresno

Brookhaven is a neighborhood in a small pocket of Southwest Fresno (the "West Side") located on the very edge of the city. It is bordered by Jensen Avenue on the north, Annadale Avenue on the south, Martin Luther King on the west Ivy on the east.

== History ==
Due to recurring attacks in the area by local gangs, the area had become known as "Dogpound". On September 18, 2007, as part of on-going efforts to reclaim the neighborhood, the Fresno City Council voted to officially name the neighborhood Brookhaven.

In a major operation with the codename "Dog Track", 28 individuals were arrested by the Fresno Police Department, a sweep that reportedly included leaders of the "Dog Pound" gang.
