= Gallery Players =

Performing arts theater in Brooklyn, NY

Coordinates: 40.6671°N 73.9905°W

Gallery Players is a community theatre which operates at its 99-seat blackbox theater at 199 14th Street, at the corner of 4th Avenue in Park Slope, Brooklyn. Founded in 1967, each season presents about 6 productions. Gallery produces classic and contemporary plays and musicals and also premieres new works.

== Early years and location moves ==
In 1967, founder Bruce Wyatt relocated from New Orleans, Louisiana, to Brooklyn, New York, bringing the concept of his New Orleans theater organization with him, along with the name The Gallery Players. The first Brooklyn incarnation was introduced in Flatbush, relocating a year later to St. Paul's Church at St. John's Place and 7th Avenue in Park Slope, Brooklyn. In 1974 they moved again to the Old First Church at Carroll Street and 7th Avenue. They remained at the Old First Church until 1984, at which time they moved to the Berkeley-Carroll School, before a period of two years during which the group had no home. 1989 to 1990 was The Gallery Players' first season at 199 14th Street in Park Slope, the venue that came to be the group's permanent home. The first season there, it produced Man of La Mancha, Frankie and Johnny in the Claire de Lune, The Dining Room, Nuts, The Boys Next Door, and a double bill of Christopher Durang's one-act plays The Actor's Nightmare, and Sister Mary Ignatius Explains It All For You.

Among the group's notable alumni are founding member Harvey Fierstein; Broadway regular Jeffry Denman; and New York theater personality Seth Rudetsky.

== Community theater ==
In 1978 The Gallery Players became an Equity Showcase house, inviting professional actors to use the Gallery performances as an opportunity to display and hone their skills. Initially focusing on "barebones" black box presentations, by the time of their pivotal production of Stephen Sondheim's A Funny Thing Happened on the Way to the Forum, a full stage had been installed. They are known for producing the first New York revivals of work first seen in Broadway and Off-Broadway venues. Gallery Players now presents a season of 6 play and musicals. In its 60 season run, over 156 plays and musicals have received their world premiere productions at Gallery Players.

== Community outreach & festivals ==
Leading up to the full productions, the Black Box Festival provides a workshop environment, facilitating readings of the new works and assisting the playwrights with the revising and expanding of their new plays. Gallery Players offers the use of its auditorium space to the Silas B. Dutcher School and P.S. 124 in Park Slope, for school events and performances, and provides its facility for use by other theatrical organizations.

== Premieres ==
- Animal Fair
- J.R.R. Tolkien's The Hobbit
- Ivan the Fool
- Merry-Go-Roundelay
- Nehemiah Hotep's Raisin Farm
- Sign on the Dotted Line
- Spoon River: The Musical
