= Secret Magic Control Agency II: Mission Sleeping Beauty =

- Theatrical release poster
- Directed by: Vladimir Nikolaev (ru); Aleksey "Alex" Tsitsilin
- Written by: Vladimir Nikolaev; Aleksey Zamyslov; Dmitry Sokolov
- Based on: Hansel and Gretel by Brothers Grimm; Sleeping Beauty
- Produced by: Sergey Selyanov (ru); Vladimir Nikolaev
- Starring: Irina Obrezkova; Yuri Romanov; Polina Avdeyenko; Aleksandr Vasilyev; Artem Krylov; Andrey Lyovin; English; Sylvana Joyce Nicholas Corda
- Music by: Artyom Ermolenko; Maksim Gromenko; Kirill Zakharchenko; English; Sefi Carmel
- Production companies: Voronezh Animation Studio; CTB Film Company; Magic Frame Animation (England/Cyprus); QED International (United States); Creation Entertainment Media (England)
- Distributed by: VLG.FILM
- Release date: 22 May 2025 (Russia)
- Running time: 90 minutes
- Country: Russia
- Languages: Russian; English
- Box office: ₽66 million

Secret Magic Control Agency II: Mission Sleeping Beauty (Russian: Ганзель и Гретель: Миссия «Спящая красавица», romanized: Ganzel i Gretel: Missiya «Spyashchaya krasavitsa», also known as Saving Sleeping Beauty) is a 2025 Russian animated spy comedy film written, produced and directed by Vladimir Nikolaev. It serves as the sequel to Secret Magic Control Agency.

The film was announced to be in production on 12 May 2023, with Alex Tsitsilin returning to direct. The film was released in Russia on 22 May 2025.

== Plot ==
"Agents Hansel and Gretel undergo their most important mission yet. In a race against the clock, the agents must work together to save a princess from her enchanted slumber. But when they cross paths with a sorcery-wielding prince who is after the same prize, Gretel finds herself battling the most powerful force she's ever experienced... true love."

== Russian voice cast ==
- Irina Obrezkova as Gretel
- Yuri Romanov as Hansel
- Polina Avdeyenko as Annette
- Aleksandr Vasilyev as Jenkins
- Artem Krylov as Rognar
- Andrey Lyovin as Asvald
- Aleksey Makretsky as the King
- Valentin Morozov as the Old Man / Forger
- Andrey Pirog as Grandfather Frost / Priest
- Yuliya Rudina as the Witch of the North
- Viktoriya Slutskaya as the Witch of the West
- Mariya Tsvetkova-Ovsyannikova as the Witch of the East
- Maksim Sergeev as Ali Baba / Trickster
- Dmitry Strelkov as Count Dracula
- Andrey Tenetko as Karabas
- Olga Ivanova as Clarissa
- Irina Chumantyeva as a stepdaughter
- Regina Shchukina as a stepmother

== Production ==
In mid-November 2022, a sequel to Secret Magic Control Agency was presented at the Cinema Fund pitching, which was dedicated to children's and youth projects, as well as author's animation.

Secret Magic Control Agency II: Mission Sleeping Beauty was announced to be in production on 12 May 2023. Tsitsilin was announced to return as director, with Joyce and Corda reprising their voice roles.

== Release ==
The film was released in Russia on 22 May 2025.

== See also ==
- List of films about witchcraft
