= The Tales of Wonder Keepers (TV series) =

- Genre: Fantasy; Comedy; Adventure
- Composers: Brad Breeck; Gabriel Hays
- Country of origin: China
- No. of seasons: 3
- No. of episodes: 78

Production
- Producer: Lulu Zhao
- Animators: Tatyana Korenskaya; Olga Nesterova; Pavel Malakhov; Shelley Page
- Production companies: Wizart Animation; Henan York Animation Film Co., Ltd.; Suzhou AoLa Animation Technology Co., Ltd.

Original release
- Network: IQIYI
- Release: 25 October 2019 – 1 June 2021

The Tales of Wonder Keepers is a Chinese 3D-animated fantasy children's television series. The first season was co-produced by IQIYI and Wizart Animation, while later seasons were produced solely by IQIYI. The series is loosely adapted from Hans Christian Andersen's fairy tale, The Snow Queen.

It follows the adventures of Icy, the five-year-old daughter of the Snow Queen, who comes to the human world to live and explore with her new friends, Gerda and Kai. Together, they embark on exciting adventures in a magical world filled with mysteries, pirates, magicians, and even walking plants. When faced with challenges, they transform into the Wonder Keepers and use both magic and science to overcome obstacles. Fearless and determined, they protect their town and stand up for what is right.

The series is currently available for streaming on iQIYI.

== Plot ==
Gerda and the charming weasel Luta rush to the aid of all those in need in their land. Gerda's pilgrimage from the Kingdom of Eternal Frost has ended as she safely brings home Kai. However, an inquisitive little girl — Icy, the daughter of the Snow Queen — tags along. Gerda, Kai, and Icy are transported into an ordinary world. In the ordinary world each of them wields extraordinary superpowers: Icy can freeze objects, Gerda has control over the North Wind, and Kai invents various kinds of mechanisms.

In the new world, Icy has opportunities to improve her socialization and balance her powers as they explore a world that suddenly turns into difficult situations. Gerda, Kai, Luta, and Icy become superheroes at their headquarters as they become their community's justice league, known as the Keepers of Wonders. Gerda becomes the guardian of the magic of the North Wind. Her special ability grants the ability to move objects in the air. Icy naturally uses her frost powers.

The practitioners of Gerda and Icy collide with the practitioners of science, Harald, the megalomaniac genius inventor of the battle robot, leading to a struggle. Alfida, the leader of the pirates, is also pitted against the Keepers of Wonders. Gerda and Icy realize magic won't always stop the villains. They come to the realisation that, although Kai's inventions aren't always used for their intended purpose, they can compete with Harald's.

When Icy disappears, Gerda and Kai go to their headquarters and transform into Keepers of Wonders. They are acquainted with the fairy Florida and her magical garden. They learn Florida will try to use magic to create an army of plants and turn the planet into a botanical garden. Later on, the brave four help solve the mysterious theft of paintings from the royal gallery, because without them, Icy will not be able to participate in the artist competition, where she was going to present her drawings. The characters use ingenuity to cope with the dangers. Eventually, they realize friendship, kindness, and a little magic can truly make them into invincible superheroes.

== Characters ==
=== Cast ===
Gerda - (voiced by Tatiana Shitova (ru)) - the protagonist of the series, who will turn into a superhero girl at the headquarters. There she will transform into the legion of the Keeper of Wonders with a magical circular disk. Gerda is the wielder of the magic of the North Wind.

Kai - (voiced by Prokhor Chekhov (ru)) - a brave inventor who believes in the power of Science. Kai's good inventions compete against the inventions of Harald.

Icy - (voiced by Tatiana Manetina) - five-year-old Icy is the daughter of the Snow Queen. The young, gifted, inquisitive magician must adjust to a new world of ordinary life that is far different from where she used to live in the North. Through socialization skills with the Keepers of Wonders, Icy will have to balance her frost power abilities.

Alfida and Florida - (voiced by Inga Smetanina) - Alfida is a fearless pirate who leads her crew seeking treasure. Florida is the fairy of a botanical garden who has super powers over plants.

Harald - (voiced by Alexander Matveev) - inventor Harald is trying to gain power using a battle robot that runs on sunflower oil. The megalomaniac science genius who constantly invents all sorts of mechanisms most formidable weapon is a giant mechanical house. The mobile laboratory and fortress has destructive powers.

Nils and Troll - (voiced by Alexander Luchinin) - Nils runs a mill house while the Troll is a mysterious ice creature that activates in unforeseen times

== Production ==
In 2017, the Wizart Animation studio was looking at the prospects of the continuation of the international feature film series, The Snow Queen. They were aware of the growing subscriber demographic of the series that has reached seventeen million viewers in Russia and abroad. The creators of the films made an unambiguous decision – to launch the film into an animated series. The spin-off production would help their audience get acquainted with the series without them waiting for about two years that usually takes for a film to be finished. Created by Wizart series of Wizart Animation, the production would present a 52 x 11 minute, 3D animated TV serial that would be targeted for children aged 6–9 years. The production would expand the familiar character's world to new areas.

The first footage was shown in the 2017 AFM. Directed by Alexey Zamyslov, Andrey Korenkov and Aleksey Tsitsilin, animation director Shelley Page also acted as a consultant. The TV series encompasses the genres of comedy, fantasy and adventure. An acclaimed music department was ordered for Snow Queen: Gerda and the Keepers of Wonders. The music was written by Brad Breeck, who also composed for the animated television series Gravity Falls.

Gabriel Hays, the composer of a number of animated television series, would provide additional musical accompaniment. The composers were particularly inspired by the characters Icy: "She is very smart, quick-witted and never gives up finding herself in a difficult situation. We hope that Icy's unique way of solving problems and getting out of the most difficult situations will become a role model for other children." The composers were able to find the right melody that is a mixture of pop and folk similar to those used in Disney classics. In terms of animation, the studio tried to keep the quality at the same level as what was used in The Snow Queen films.

The film was slated to be finished by the fall of 2019. At the Cartoon Forum 2018 in Toulouse, the series was presented. The showcase at the International Animated Film Market (MIFA) in 2018 featured details on the series. The series was part of the exhibition at the MIPCOM-2018 presented by Aleksandra Modestova, General Director of Expocontent company. In June 2020, MIFA held online also featured the TV series. The series was presented in the world's first audiovisual online market of Russia, Key Buyers Event: Digital Edition. A preview of The Snow Queen series was held at 2019 festival Animatika in Artek, Russia. Director Andrey Korenkov organized the event where the participants were able to learn about animation.

In 2019 fall, Snow Queen: Gerda and the Keepers of Wonders was released. On City Day, 21 September 2019 the premiere was held at Voronezh. The first five episodes were shown. The event occurred in Voronezh because Wizart Animation has headquarters at the city. Vladimir Nikolaev, the producer of the series stated "The premiere of the new series in our hometown is especially significant for us. Viewers around the world know Wizart not just as a Russian company, but as an animation studio from Voronezh." In October 2019, Kidburg Interactive Museum in Voronezh hosted an animation workshop where children under the guidance of professional animators learn about how the animated series was made. In October 2019, only after three episodes the show was able to be viewed by 1.5 million viewers in the social network, VK. Daria Zhilkina, marketing manager at VKontakte says, "We are glad that the first to see the series was the users of the social network VK, where the consumption of animated content is steadily growing. The number of views suggests that the return of your favorite characters to the screens was perceived positively by the audience." In December 2019, Carousel broadcast the show.

The first four episodes of the series were part of special screenings in the New Year of 2019 in Moscow that was organized by the Moscow Department of Culture. In February 2020 the series crossed forty five million viewers in TV. In recognition for this event, manufacturer Simbat signed a master toy contract with Wizart for the distribution of dolls, character figures, board games of the series to the market. In 2020, Wizart Animation released inspirational backgrounds for Zoom based on the series.

The series is currently broadcast in the channels of STS Kids, Carousel and O!. The animation studio Wizart made a new mobile app "Guardians of Wonders: Snowballs." The arcade game available in AppStore and Google Play features a realistic snowball fight with trolls and the heroes of the series. On 27 June 2021, at the International TV Content Market MIP China, Wizart Animation revealed the series will be co-produced iQiyi studio. Considered one of the first Russian iQiyi Original, The Tales of Wonder Keepers will reach a wide audience. It is available in English and Mandarin with additional subtitles.

=== Themes ===
The film presents main character Gerda along with the familiar cast of Kai, Alfida, Harald, and Luta. However, the serial will show them in their child form. The creators of the film introduced a new character, Icy, whom the series is completely centered around. Characterized as a little gifted girl with frost powers, each episode recounts how Icy along with the heroes overcome challenges and live in an ordinary world with magical abilities. The themes of socialization and friendship are explored in the film through the character Icy. The characters will be conceptualized with heroic qualities as they are transformed into superheroes known as Keepers of Wonders. The time frame for the series takes place just after the first film, The Snow Queen.

== Episodes ==
=== Season 1 (2019–21) ===
All episodes in this season were written by Dimitri Nesterak, Ilkham Abdel Khalek, Alina Dobrokvashina, Kristina Nebolcina, Alexander Petrenko, Kseniya Sibirko, Vera Sychkova, Julia Sheina, Nina Kosmileva, Kristina Ivanstova, Sibel Galina, Ekaterina Cuellar Rodriguez, Tatyana Skoropad, Semyon Astafyev, Anna Priymenko, Tatyana Kamshilina, Alexander Danchev, Natalya Sokolova, Karina Sabbina, and Lyudmila Platonova.

Story	Episode	Title	Release Date
1	1	"First Day"	25 October 2019
Little fairy Icy has lived all her life in the North, where flowers did not grow. Icy decides to go and explore the garden of Florida where flowers grow. However suddenly she is imprisoned by a flower fairy. Only the Guardians of Miracles can save her now out of the labyrinth garden mazes.
2	2	"The Best Summer Entertainment"	28 October 2019
A mysterious sabotage at the city gallery will find the Guardian of Wonders battling the crew of pirate Alfida. Their efforts will determine whether Kai and Icy can attend the painting competition that was supposed to be held there but was now cancelled.
3	3	"The Road Home"	31 October 2016
Icy, Gerda, Kai and Luta went to the mill. But it turned out that its blades were missing somewhere, and without them it is impossible to make flour for the residents of the city. It remains to be seen who destroyed the mill and stole the blades. This task is for the Keepers of Wonders.
4	4	"Harald's Revenge"	20 November 2019
In the city where Icy, Gerda, Kai and Luta live, strange flying objects have appeared. They steal other people's inventions. This task is for Keepers of Wonders who must return the stolen items to their rightful owners.
5	5	"Mysterious Forest"	27 November 2019
Icy, Gerda, Kai and Luta go on a picnic. A walk through the forest promises to be amazing. But on the way, the friends discover that only stumps remain from part of the forest. Someone does not protect nature. This task is for the Keepers of Wonders. The Guardians of Wonders are in a hurry to find out who this mysterious lumberjack is.
6	6	"A Matter of Taste"	4 December 2019
Icy and Gerda bake vegetable and fruit pies. However a trip to the green shop finds all the produce stolen by a mysterious thief. Only the Keepers of Wonders can find them now.
7	7	"Dogfight"	11 December 2019
In the Ice Kingdom, where Icy used to live, there are no balloons-that's why the baby is so surprised by the balloon that Kai built with his own hands. The young inventor promises her that she will be able to fly as soon as he completes the basket. But in the morning, it is discovered that the ball has been stolen. This means that the little princess ' dream of flying is under threat. The Keepers of Wonders must find the basket again.
8	8	"The Power of Knowledge"	18 December 2019
Icy is very curious about the human world, because in the Ice Kingdom, where she comes from, everything was different. But the answers to all the questions are only in the Library, where many different books are stored. After going there, Icy, Gerda, Kai, and Luta discover that the city's Knowledge Center has been savagely looted. Someone stole all the books to get their knowledge. The Guardians of Wonders will have to find the kidnappers and return all the books to the residents.
9	9	"Magic Words"	25 December 2019
All the water has disappeared from the city where Icy, Gerda, Kai and Luta live. The weather is hot outside. It turned out that the fairy Florida steals water to keep her garden from drying out during the heat. Only the Keepers of Wonders can return the water to the citizens at the same time water their garden of fresh flowers.
10	10	"The Ice Troll"	8 January 2020
Princess Icy knows about the ability to wield snow and frost. That is why she gets angry when Kai and Gerda tell her how to make neat snowballs. Icy suddenly shows her full frost powers by creating an ice troll. Suddenly the ice troll turns alive.
11	11	"Mysterious Disappearances"	17 January 2020
Its time of miracles as the holidays and the New Year is approaching. Icy never prepared for holidays before. That is why Gerda, Kai, and Luta decide to take her to the city square to see the Christmas tree. However something is not all right as they realize the tree is stolen. It is now time for the Keepers of Wonders to find the clues to the location of the tree.
12	12	"A Dangerous Invention"	20 February 2020
Kai's flying satchel is flown to the air. The surveillance reveals mysterious activity at Harald's secret fortress, the giant mechanical house. Kai tells Gerda and Icy about this activity and decide to investigate the castle near the train station.
14	14	"The Enemy is on the Doorstep"	20 March 2020
Icy, Gerda, Kai and Luta have fun playing "Sea Battle" in their home. Suddenly a cannonball shatters their doorstep. Looking out they see Alfida's crew approaching the city. The flotilla of flying ships must be stopped by a special tactical plan of action by the Keepers of Wonders.
15	15	"The Greedy Forest"	1 April 2020
Gerda, Kai, Icy and Luta go for a walk in the forest. There they find not only a lot of delicious berries, but also frightened children who run away from the living forest plants in fear. It turns out that the fairy Florida is not going to share the gifts of nature. The Wonder Keepers are going to change Florida's mind and show her how nice it is to share with others.
16	16	"The Fire at the Mill"	17 June 2020
A trip to the miller to talk to miller Nils turns into fire rescue operation as Alfida and the pirates were about to rob the mill. Suddenly their action caused fire. Both friends and enemies unite to stop the fire from spreading.
17	17	"Battle of the Invention"	5 August 2020
Talented inventor Kai creates an innovative machine, thanks to his knowledge and perseverance. On a buggy, friends go for a walk. Setting a trap, the insidious villain Harald steals the car along with Kai. Icy, Gerda and Luta will have to free Kai.
18	18	"Winter Garden"	26 September 2020
The winter is fast approaching and the townspeople are finding it hard to stay warm as coal is being depleted. The natural resource is also being shared by fairy Florida who is using it to warm the greenhouse. The Keepers of Wonders must find a way to share the natural resource for everyone before winter's cold weather arrives.
19	19	"Ice Chase"	2 December 2020
An alpine skiing trip by Icy, Gerda, Kai and Luta is being planned. Icy never skied before and Kai is showing what the techniques are when they suddenly realize the lower lift has been destroyed. They investigate and see the Ice Troll. They run away from the troll. They decide to turn to the superheroes Keepers of Wonders to confront the Ice Troll.
20	20	"Attack of the Monsters"	1 January 2021
Icy, Gerda, Kai and Luta go to the market and encounter terrible Vegetable Monsters that attack the inhabitants and destroy everything that comes in their way. Marcy May comes to the rescue of the Wonder Keepers.
21	21	"In Search of Treasure"	30 January 2021
Alfida's dream is to get all the treasures of the world. The pirates find a map that indicates the place where the treasure is hidden and this is the central city square. The Guardians of Wonders are always on the lookout and are in a hurry to prevent the pirates from destroying the center of their beloved city.
22	22	"A Cruel Deception"	13 February 2021
One day, Alfida comes to the Guardians of Miracles, and not just for nothing, but for help. It turns out that the insidious villain Harald captured her ship-airship along with the crew. The Guardians of Miracles decide to help her and understand what really happened.
23	23	"Sea Patrol"	1 June 2021
24	24	"Cave of Fear"	1 June 2021
25	25	"Treacherous Move"	1 June 2021
26	26	"Fairytale Watch"	1 June 2021

== TV channels and online platforms ==
Channel	Country
CTC	Russia
O!	Russia
Carousel	Russia
Mult	Russia
iQiyi	China

== Festivals and awards ==
At the 18th Hiroshima International Animation Festival that premiered on 20 August 2020, the series was selected to be screened at the Animation for Children section. Chicago International Children's Film Festival as part of the Academy Awards recommendation juries will evaluate the series.

Award	Date of ceremony	Category	Recipient(s) and nominee(s)	Result
Suzdalfest	March 2020	Serials	Episode 8: The Power of Knowledge	Nominated
Icarus	15 March 2020	Startup/Episode	Snow Queen: Gerda and the Keepers of Wonders	Nominated
The Academy of Russian Television Foundation (TEFI-KIDS)	5 October 2020	Best Music for a Children's Program	Brad Breeck	Nominated
Constantine's Gold Coin (Serbia)	13 November 2020	Best Animated Film	Episode 5: Mysterious Forest	Nominated
International Film Festival for Children and Youth "Hero" (Krasnoyarsk)	19 November 2020	Short Animated Film	Snow Queen: Gerda and the Keepers of Wonders	Nominated
