= Voronezh Animation Studio =

Russian animation studio

- Type: Animation studio
- Industry: Motion pictures; Television
- Predecessor: InlayFilm
- Founded: 2007; 19 years ago
- Founder: Vladimir Nikolaev; Yuri Moskvin
- Headquarters: Voronezh, Russia
- Area served: Worldwide
- Key people: Vladimir Nikolaev (general producer); Yuri Moskvin; Alexander Dorogov; Aleksey Tsitsilin; Diana Yurinova
- Products: Animation films
- Services: CGI animation; Filmmaking; Television
- Number of employees: 200 (2021)
- Website: voronezh.studio

Voronezh Animation Studio (Russian: анимационная студия «Воронеж», romanized: animatsionnaya studiya «Voronezh», formerly known as Wizart Animation) is a Russian animation film, short film and television studio based in Voronezh. The studio specializes in the production of animated feature films, television shows and their distribution and promotion in the domestic and international markets. The studio was formed in 2007 from a company specializing in software development, multimedia and software localization. Originally founded under the name InlayFilm, it rebranded as Wizart Animation in 2012. In August 2022, the company changed its name to Voronezh Animation Studio.

The company's main art technique is CGI animation that is used for their flagship series, The Snow Queen. The films from the series gave the studio the entrance into the film industry that has been recently noted by the animation industry. Its most recent release was The Snow Queen & the Princess, released on 16 February 2023.

== History ==
=== Early history ===
Former logo as Wizart Animation

The studio was founded in 2007 in Voronezh, Russia by a group of artists from the computer game and information technology industry. Their experience allowed them to launch a new type of computer animation studio that involve animators from different cities of Russia. In 2011, Wizart Animation created a new business department to promote and sell animation content in Russian and international markets. Their vision was a production facility to produce world-class family animated feature films and animated series, as well as international sales and a marketing department. Until 2012, the studio operated under the name InlayFilm with the main production site of the studio located in Voronezh, and some divisions located in Moscow. On 6 February 2012, InlayFilm rebranded into Wizart Animation.

The newly independent Wizart Animation studio was led by Vladimir Nikolaev (ru) as general producer and Yuri Moskvin as CEO. Vladimir Nikolaev introduced the company's films to events such as the 17th Open Russian Comedy Movie Festival held in Tula Oblast. Yuri Moskvin incorporated his 1999 PC game company Russobit-M over to InlayFilm for a joint re-profiling. The venture created an infusion of game knowledge that ultimately changed the trajectory of the studio into an animation house. Moskvin was the main producer for the studio's first franchise The Snow Queen. Moskvin also took part in signing a 2018 media alliance for Wizart at the Eastern Economic Forum in Vladivostok. Key people for Wizart Animation include Diana Yurinova, head of international distribution. Yurinova was instrumental in selling the studio's films to international high competition markets such as those in China. Olga Sinelshchikova, was the Business Development Director for Wizart Animation. Sinelshchikova is also the Vice President executive of Russian World Studios. For Wizart Animation, Sinelshchikova was vital as the business manager at the 2011 AFM The Snow Queen distributions. Anna Pokorskaya, as the international distribution manager negotiated deals for the sequels to The Snow Queen series. They presented the films in international sale markets such as the film festivals of Cannes and Toronto International Film Festival.

At the Animation Summit, Wizart Animation revealed animation in Russia is developing in the right direction. A few accomplishments were presented. Distribution-wise, its film have been distributed to South Korea, Brazil, Turkey, Middle East and Czech Republic for a total of 140 different countries around the world. Its films are selected in more than forty internationally acclaimed festivals.

=== Debut ===
The animators noted the fairy tale genre with its magical world and adventures was ideal for animated film adaptations. They explored the concept of adapting Hans Christian Andersen's The Snow Queen. Wizart Animation's first project The Snow Queen, a 3D computer-animated fantasy adventure film co-produced with Bazelevs and InlayFilm was ready for release in 2012. Wizart Animation planned for the film ever since 2007.

The film had a relatively easy domestic release on 31 December 2012. However international release was complicated due to the Russian animation industry in initial stages of development since the 1990s. Wizart Animation explored the concept of presenting The Snow Queen for the upcoming AFM (American Film Market). They believed the film has all the right materials for an international release.

The studio's initial concept of domestic and international package came to fruition when the film received positive feedback from buyers from over twenty countries at the AFM. The movie also found appeal from distributors at the 67th Cannes International Film Festival in France. Key people who made the realization of the project possible was the Business Development Director Olga Sinelshchikova as well as director Timur Bekmambetov. They were helpful in developing the animation company based on a new novel concept during that time period that is based on international avenue of development. The film became the winner of the Moscow Youth Film Festival "Reflection" in the category "Best Animated Film." Critics such as Annecy review noted the film was a successful venture despite its budget being 5% of a Disney budget. The also noted it was a more faithful adaptation of Andersen's fairy tale than the other modern-day adaptations.

On 29 January 2013, a few weeks after the release, Voronezh State University partnered with Wizart Animation to open an animation department at the university. The partnership was intended to be a training base for future employees to the animation studio. Film producer Sergey Selyanov, visited the studio during 2013. At a conference at City Hall with Governor Alexey Gordeev, Selyanov remarked Voronezh is developing domestic animation and within a very short time Wizart Animation was able to become a reputable high-tech film industry company comparable to its peers in St.Petersburg. At the top ten highest-grossing production centers and film companies in Russia in the first half of 2013, Wizart Animation came in tenth place. Kommersant believed The Snow Queen film was part of a creative industry movement that inaugurated a new era in Russian animation.

=== Sequels ===
In 2014, Wizart Animation's first film followed up with the sequel, The Snow Queen 2: The Snow King. The Bazelevs Company produced the sequel and the film was well received both domestically and internationally. The sequel officially made the studio's first animated series be seen in over 130 countries with a total international box office of $30 million.

The studio's first original film, Sheep and Wolves, was released in Russian theaters on 28 April 2016. Directed by Andrey Galat and Maxim Volkov, it was one of the most anticipated movies in 2016. The movie later released internationally. Critics have noted the adventure fantasy film's comedic references to other films. In 2016, Wizart Animation revamped its marketing team coinciding with it main goals of promoting its brand through advertising within international and domestic markets.

Wizart Animation continued on its record to produce sequels to The Snow Queen series. In 2016, The Snow Queen 3: Fire and Ice was released. The trequel became a breakthrough event. At the time of its release the film became the highest-grossing Russian film in foreign box office. The film strengthened the commercial ties between Russia and China, as a trilateral agreement was signed at the Russian Export Center to promote Russian animation abroad. Wizart Animation is one of the foremost clients of REC. The development institute's objective is to support and channel the export of Russian audio-visual products to domestic and international markets.

The Snow Queen series was one of the cinematic output that represented the Russian creative industry by the end of the 2010 decade. During this decade the animation industry was one of the major creative arms of the Russian film industry. It was one of the fastest growing sectors of Russian economy and was being recognized as part of the international creative industries. Wizart Animation revived a Soviet classic by presenting a short film, Kitten from Lizyukov Street 2 in 2018. The feature is a tribute to the original Soviet Union film of the same name and has been recognized with international awards. The fourth accompaniment to the franchise The Snow Queen: Mirrorlands was released on 1 January 2019. For the first time in Russian animation history, a film was co-directed by a Hollywood animator, Robert Lence. The film was received in North America through cable TV and global digital platforms in December 2020.

Wizart Animation has become noted for renewing a 19th-century fairy tale The Snow Queen in animated format. Film critics see the studio as one of Europe's highest potential animation studios. Today The Snow Queen animated tetralogy has managed to be released to over hundred fifty countries and has been translated into thirty languages. On 24 January 2019, the sequel to Sheep and Wolves released titled Sheep and Wolves: Pig Deal. Financial analysis has approximated an overall $100 million worldwide gross that include the generation of secondary revenues from the two franchises The Snow Queen and Sheep and Wolves before the budget.

The brands The Snow Queen and Sheep and Wolves have set new records for the animation studio. Areas once inaccessible to Russian film industry are now opening such as the French territories. Wizart Animation has been placed in the TOP 25 Animation Companies to Watch catalog compiled by Animation Magazine. Producer Yuri Moskvin noted the average production budget for independent animated films in the world is about $20 million, above $80 million in North America and $5–6 million for Wizart Animation productions.

The animation studio decided to adapt the classic 1812 fairy tale Hansel and Gretel to the theater screens. The animated fairy tale retelling Secret Magic Control Agency was released on 18 March 2021 in Russia. Netflix acquired global rights to the film and released it as the first Russian animation Netflix Original on 25 March 2021. The film set a number of streaming records. It became the first Russian project to top global viewership charts of an international VOD platform; the most watched film in Netflix for consecutive two days in the beginning of April 2021 and second in Nielsen streaming rankings for the week of March 29-April 4, 2021.

=== Upcoming films ===
Animation feature films that are in production include The Warrior Princess, the story is based on a traditional fairy tale that will be narrated based on a global language.

== Wizart Animation School ==
A meeting was held between the Voronezh State University (VSU) administration with representatives of the Wizart Animation studio as early as December 2012 when The Snow Queen was ready to debut in Russia. General producer Vladimir Nikolaev noted the studio was short of talent. The studio sought help from the university. With the support of Voronezh region and the governor Alexey Gordeev, the first stepping stone to the "Wizart Animation School" was established.

The collaboration would ensure that a once thriving animation industry during the Soviet Union is now revived in the modern era through independent training of animation specialists. The school is led by animation director Alexander Dorogov. Wizart Animation School was Russia's first privately sponsored state university course in computer graphics and animation.

== Feature films ==
=== Traditions ===
Wizart Animation's main objective is to develop, produce and distribute high-quality adventure, comedy, family animated media that combine innovative technologies of stereoscopy, CGI animation with traditional animation. Their stories' main audience is the children and even adults that have family-friendly content. Vladimir Nikolaev, general producer at Wizart Animation explains the animation studio always tried to make its features accepted into global animation community, “From the very beginning, our goal has been to create commercial animation features that a viewer of any country will find interesting.”

The stories they develop narrate positive themes such as believing in miracles and family. The company's portfolio contains animation projects at various stages of production. Wizart Animation offered insight into the concept of Russian film distribution in international markets that was a relatively new trend in the Russian film industry in the early 2010s. The studio noted since their startup days they went abroad marketing their game merchandise.

During animation development of The Snow Queen as well as Sheep and Wolves, it is noted the studio has over 14-17 departments with two hundred employees from areas such as 2D and 3D animators, lighting engineers, cameramen, sound engineers with the standard classic use of boards, paper, pencils, still forming the basis for much of their work. Usually a film takes about two years to make with the drawings created in picture form first. Then the drawings are rendered in 3D. Wizart Animation continues the tradition of Voronezh city animation, ever since the city's animation debut in 1988 when director Vyacheslav Kotyonochkin released the cartoon The Kitten from Lizyukov Street. Aleksey Tsitsilin, one of the leading directors in Voronezh noted employment in the city has its own advantages such as more adequate prices in the labor market and a general level of ease and simplicity. The team at the studio is a cordial community-based collaboration. Furthermore, the studio with the support of the Film Foundation has fostered a creative ecosystem for the animators whom they believe are talented.

Wizart Animation innovated their software by creating a cloud system for fourth part of The Snow Queen series. In 2019, Wizart unveiled a unique animation technology - an operating special effects system built for facial and skeleton setup. The official application of the first version of the system was used for the 2021 film Secret Magic Control Agency. The film also marked the first three-dimensional animated film shot in Russia in which the 3D lighting was carried out in the studio's own 3D editor.

=== Awards and acclaim ===
The studio's works have been recognized by the Annecy International Animated Film Festival (1 nomination), Asia Pacific Screen Awards (2 nominations), Golden Eagle Award (1 nomination), Golden Unicorn Award (1 nomination, 2 wins), Nika Award (1 nomination), Gijón International Film Festival (1 nomination), Suzdalfest (2 nominations, 3 wins), Prague Independent Film Festival (2 wins).

== Filmography ==
=== Released films ===
Title	Release date
The Snow Queen	31 December 2012
The Snow Queen 2: The Snow King	1 January 2015
Yoko and His Friends	13 September 2015
Sheep and Wolves	28 April 2016
The Snow Queen 3: Fire and Ice	29 December 2016
The Snow Queen 4: Mirrorlands	1 January 2019
Sheep and Wolves 2: Pig Deal	24 January 2019
Secret Magic Control Agency	18 March 2021
The Snow Queen & The Princess	16 February 2023

==== Upcoming films ====
Title	Release date
Aibolit	13 May 2027

=== Short films ===
Title	Release date
The Kitten from Lizyukov Street 2	2017
Magic Book	2018
Kitten from Admiralteyskaya Square	2023

=== Television series ===
Title	Release date
Yoko	13 November 2016
The Tales of Wonder Keepers	25 October 2019
Superheroi.ru	2 November 2023

=== Television pilots ===
Title	Year	Notes
Magic Book	2018	Unproduced television pilot
Tin's Firebots	2020	Pitched to Animation Production Days
In My Backpack	TBA	
