= Yoko (TV series) =

- Йоко
- Genre: Adventure Comedy Short film Children education
- Created by: Juanjo Elordi; Edorta Barruetabeña; Rishat Gilmetdinov; P. Kevin Strader; Andy Yerkes
- Written by: Andy Yerkes; Evgenia Golubeva; Edorta Barruetabeña; P. Kevin Strader; Juanjo Elordi; Cristina Broquetas; Stanislav Dobrovski; Daniiar Iambushev; Leo Murzenko
- Voices of: Tyler Bunch; Eileen Stevens; Ramya Ravi; Jaione Intxausti; Arantxa Moñux(eu); Vladimir Voityuk; Vasilisa Eldarova; Archipp Lebedev; Svetlana Permyakova (ru)
- Opening theme: "Playing with my Friends"; Lyrics by Edorta Barruetabeña
- Composers: Michael Richard Plowman; Vasily Filatov (ru)
- Countries of origin: Russia; Spain
- No. of seasons: 3
- No. of episodes: 78

Production
- Executive producers: Juanjo Elordi; Yuri Moskvin; Ricardo Ramón; Ana Ruiz Aguilera; Jone Landaluze; Vladimir Nikolaev (ru); Xavi Viza
- Producers: Elena Gozalo; Alexander Mirgorodskiy; Iurre Tellería; Benat Beitia; Daniiar Iambushev; Thatcher Scott Dyer Mines
- Editors: Alexandria Aleksashina; Alatzne Portu; Andrey Galat; Maialen Sarasua Oliden
- Running time: 12 minutes
- Production companies: Dibulitoon Studio (international); Somuga (international); Wizart Animation (international); Animiturri (English version); RTVE (international); EITB (international & Russian, season 2); Yoko Dibulitoon (international, season 2)

Original release
- Network: Carousel (Russia); Clan/ETB 3 (Spain)
- Release: September 12, 2016 – October 26, 2020

Yoko is a 3D-animated adventure children's education television series that released in 2016. The target audience is preschool. The first season contains 52 episodes. Spanish companies Somuga based in Andoain and Dibulitoon Studio based in Irún with RTVE along with Wizart Animation from Russia were the animation studios who produced the animated series. Yoko is the first Russian-Spanish animated co-production in the history of animation. The story is written by Juanjo Elordi, Edorta Barruetabeña, P. Kevin Strader and Andy Yerkes. Yoko features a multilingual adaptation of the magical adventures of the character Yoko (translated from Basque – "spirit of the game"). Juanjo Elordi and Rishat Gilmetdinov directed the episodes. The idea was conceptualized by Juanjo Elordi from the Basque Country.

The series is intended for children from 4–6 years old (12 minutes and 52 episodes per season) with educational content for the preschool social curriculum. Originally produced in the languages of Spanish, Russian, English and Basque; the first season aired on 13 November 2015 within the primary regions of Russia and Spain. During 2017 and 2018, Jetpack Distributions began a series of distribution agreements across the markets of Europe. Currently, the series' reruns are broadcast on TV platforms, such as Clan, Tlum, CTC and RTVE.

The series follows three children who unexpectedly meet the spirit of the game, Yoko. Together they revive the game and opens incredible world of childhood. Yoko adds magic to children's games and turns fantasy into reality. With the help of Yoko; Oto, Vik, Mai, and Ranger Loops pass difficult and entertaining tests that are featured in landscapes such as space, the raging sea, the fairy forest, and ancient cities. The series facilitates engagement with the outside world emphasizing ways children can play outside. Reed MIDEM, a MIP organizer has twice awarded the TV series with the title, "Animated Series with Highest International Potential."

== Plot ==
The story follows the adventures of Maya, Oto and Umka and a magical creature named Yoko. Yoko has been developed as a truly international property focused on outdoor play patterns with a social curriculum that mixes friendship, nature, and imagination. Yoko is a magical forest creature who only appears to those children who play with no holds barred. The main characters simply love to play outside. The enthusiasm and energy with which they throw themselves headlong into their games arouses the curiosity of a magical being Yoko who takes ordinary children's games and turns them into extraordinary adventures. Thanks to Yoko's magic, games such as "tag", for example, can suddenly become an exciting rocket race in outer space. Adventures are featured in various settings that cross different continents.

== Characters ==
Yoko - Yoko is the most friendly magical creature. He is a yellow giant with bunny ears. His species once occupied the parkland before buildings and people closed it in. Yoko has a unique way of communication. He emotes, gestures and uses the word "Yoko" a thousand different ways. But somehow Oto, Vik, and Mai understand everything. Yoko is quite old by human years, but young in Yoko years. He has emotional and social maturity of a child. Yoko is all about good time but he is unpredictable, emotional and contrary. Most of the time Yoko simply acts and plays like one of gang. Abuelita or Granny states, "Yoko only appears to children who love to play." Yoko uses magic to maximize or minimize existing conditions and objects. He also can make a cloud rain in one spot, freeze a lake, or make the sun shine.

Vik - Vik, 6 years-old, is the most reasonable of the bunch. The smartest and most erudite boy among the friends, Vik has a clearer idea of the rules of a game, although he has trouble catching on when things change. But, once Vik gets the gist he is a skilled role player who really gets into details. He has brown hair, brown eyes, and tan skin. He seeks peace and equanimity for others and for his own sanity. Vik is the one to say "time out!"

Mai - 4 year-old Mai is very sweet at heart. Mai is the only female in the company of kids. She loves everything about natural world of the park: flowers, trees. She has long, spiky, hot pink hip-length hair, green eyes and fair skin. She wears a yellow-orange medium-sleeved shirt with white short around the hem of the sleeves and the white short collar, a white short stripe along the bottom/on it, a green skirt, white short socks and darker pine-green sneakers. Mai is very verbal. She considers herself to be an expert about a lot of things. Mai likes to be prepared and is never far from her four-wheeled pull cart.

Oto - Oto is an impulsive 5-year-old. The most perky, naughty, and active among the friends; Oto likes everything connected with sports, rivalry, and active rest. He has blue hair, blue eyes, and fair-reddish skin. Physical Oto was made for outdoor play. He loves digging, climbing, skidding and earth foraging. But nothing dampens his enthusiasm for long. When the play begins, his creative ideas form exiting roles for everybody and scenarios that keep on giving. Oto's the last one to say "It's time to go home."

Ranger Loops - Ranger Loops is a park ranger who is the main woman in the park. She keeps the peace and order in City Park. She is enthusiastic and loves leading the kids in flower-sniffing exercises and wild animal calls. She is also a banjo player who sings short musical ditties about park rules and obscure nature facts. She looks after the park and enjoys chatting with children. Working out of the park recreation house, Ranger Loops dispenses sports gear, costumes, and art materials to the kids.

=== Cast ===
Character	English Actor	Russian Actor	Spanish Actor
Oto (Russian: Митя, romanized: Mitya)	Eileen Stevens	Vladimir Voityuk (Season 1) Stepan Sereda (Season 2)	Eva Ojanguren
Mai (Russian: Майя, romanized: Maya)	Alyson Leigh Rosenfeld	Vasilisa Eldarova (Season 1) Alisa Efimenko (Season 2)	Jaione Intxausti
Vik (Russian: Вик, romanized: Vik)	Sarah Natochenny	Archipp Lebedev (Episode 1-39) Andrey Yanayt (Episode 40-52) Tikhon Efimenko (Season 2)	Arantxa Moñux
Ranger Loops (Russian: Тётя Маша, romanized: Aunt Masha)	Eileen Stevens	Svetlana Permyakova	Eva Ojanguren
Yoko (Russian: Йоко, romanized: Yoko)	Tyler Bunch	Tyler Bunch	Tyler Bunch

== Production ==
=== Television debut ===
The original idea was created by Juanjo Elordi, the director from the Basque Country whose animated film credits including Olentzero: A Christmas Carol. The concept was formalized in 2011 after realizing a children's project based on outdoor play was fitting for the time period they were living in. The concept was rarely explored in the Basque region television channels. The support of projects related to children's television content during the timer period was lacking. Elordi would create a network of animation studios from Spain who started work on animated series about the benefits of outdoor play and the interaction of urban environments and children, all conceptualized by the eponymous character Yoko. Writer Edorta Barruetabeña from Spain wrote the script while Wizart Animation would provide additional support in animation. The project became the first Russian-Spanish series in the history of animated co-production.

In terms of animation, Alexey Medvedev stated one of the unique parts of the characters is how unusually organized their limbs are because they were designed around square geometrical framework. In order to feature a bending motion to the characters, a special animated muscular curve was made over fitted on their polygonal grid animated framework.

Around July 2015, Wizart Animation revealed the studios were working on a 52 x 12 minute, 3D animated series which is targeted for children aged 4–6 years. All the characters have their own distinct characteristics and do not resemble each other. The eponymous character Yoko who is characterized as a game-friendly forest dweller whose language consists of only one word, Yoko or Basque for "game." The character is also depicted as an invisible being to adults but visible to children.

Director Rishat Gilmetdinov says, "There will be an interactive part for each episode — a minute-long thematic game will be told, and there will be a cultural exchange: our games, Spanish games. And children, after watching this part, will be able to go to the Park and play with friends in these games. This is intended to break away from tablets and computers." Andy Yerkes was one of the creators of the series with previous credits including Pocoyo and Jungle Junction. Animation director and screenwriter Evgenia Golubeva wrote the first fifteen episodes for the series. Eva Ojanguren, Jaione Intxausti and Arantxa Moñux for the Basque version were in charge of giving voice to the protagonists of while, H.D. Quinn, a voice actor from the Pokémon series, voiced the character Yoko for all the versions of the film.

In the 2014 MIPCOM the new animated series Yoko was presented. The series received acclaim from buyers of Indonesia, Turkey and the Middle East. At the Asia TV Forum & Market in October 2015 held in Singapore, the series was presented to the potential buyers in Asia. At the Shanghai Film Market held in June 2015, Wizart presented the animated series. In 2015 Cannes at MIPJunior, the series was presented to one of the largest international exhibition of content for children and youth. A movie based on the TV series was launched in 2015 titled Yoko and His Friends (Yoko y Sus Amigos) that was released along with the TV broadcast. In Russia, the first season, consisting of 52 episodes, premiered on Russian national channels CTC and Carousel during late 2016. Additionally, in Spain the series broadcast on RTVE channel CLAN TV. On 14 May 2016, a special premiere of the TV series in the Russian theaters occurred that featured the Episode 23 (Small Safari), where the characters will go on a journey through the wildlife. The event was organized by the special cinema event known as CARTOON in the cinema.

=== Distributions ===
Following a number of agreements, the series broadcast in Russian educational channel O! (Pay TV Worldwide), as well as on Mult, Tlum, Ani (Pay TV), VTV in Belarus and ETV in Estonia. In March 2017, Jetpack Distributions, a global distributor of entertainment distributed the series to Canada, Portugal, India and Sri Lanka. Canada's BBC Knowledge, Portugal's Canal Panda, India and Sri Lanka's Sun TV, and the Nick Jr. Channel in Italy agreed to broadcast the show. Promotional toy campaign was launched by Bauer, Russia's DUM and Alliance, as well as Spain's Bizak. A Master Toy agreement was signed featuring wooden toys, action figures of the four cartoon characters: Yoko, Mitya, Vic and Maya; and construction sets. In Spain, the TV series debuted in March 2017 in the Basque language on EITB.

In February 2018, Jetpack Distributor bought Netflix on a deal to broadcast the series for new countries in U.S. and United Kingdom. Dominic Gardiner, the CEO of Jetpack Distribution says, "Yoko has proved to have mass global appeal. It contains elements that pre-school kids really love, including magic and adventure. It also highlights the value of play and delivers positive messages." New countries to broadcast the series included China released by distributor Huashi TV on Tencent. Nat Geo Kids Latin America picked up the show for Latin American and the Caribbean countries.

Around July 2018, the animation studios revealed they would be presenting a second season for Yoko due for delivery in Autumn 2018. In Russia the second season debuted in October 2019 on the channel O! In April 2020, Wizart presented Maya Knows, an educational TV series spin-off of the project Yoko. In each episode, the heroine Maya, along with her magical friend Yoko, will explain to children an interesting fact about the world around them.

Currently Yoko airs in international channels across 60 countries. In Spain, the series broadcast in ETB 3. Since its premiere in 2016, Yoko has achieved an average share of 24% viewership in the target of 4-8 age group as indicated by RTVE in Spain.

== Series overview ==
Series	Episodes	Originally aired	
Series	Episodes	First aired	Last aired
1	52	12 September 2016	8 November 2016
2	14	22 July 2019	22 October 2019
3	13	30 April 2020	26 October 2020

== Episodes ==
=== Season 1 (2016) ===
Story	Episode	Title	Directed by	Written by	Release Date
1	1	"First Day"	Juanjo Elordi	Edorta Barruetabeña	12 September 2016
Vik remembers the day he met Oto, Mai and Yoko. It's the park opening, and, being shy, Vik is avoiding all the other kids. Oto and Mai invite him to play trains with them. At first, they're just three kids playing trains, but something strange starts to happen; all at once, the three kids find themselves inside a "real" train zooming through the park, and taking off into outer space. They reach a planet where, finally, they meet Yoko, the magical author of their adventure.
2	2	"The Monster of Lake Wawa"	Dzhalil Rizvanov	Evgenia Golubeva	13 September 2016
When Mai loses her badminton racquet in the Lake, Ranger Loops tells the children the legend of the Monster of Lake Wawa. "Don't worry, it's just a story," she tells them. But together with Yoko they go on an underwater quest in order to find out what the monster looks like. After several close calls, and findin something mysterious they finally find the monster, and discover it's not a monster at all - it's the "monster" that's been helping them on their journey.
3	3	"Patty Loops"	Rishat Gilmetdinov	Cristina Broquetas	14 September 2016
Ranger Loops brings her niece, Patty, to spend the day in the park. The kidS are excited to spend the day with her, but Patty doesn't seem so sure. And the harder they try to get Patty to play with them, the less sure she seems. They're determined, however, and with Yoko's magical help, they do their best to impress the new kid.
4	4	"Camp Out!"	Dzhalil Rizvanov	Cristina Broquetas	15 September 2016
Today the kids decide to pretend that they're camping. It all seems like fun at first, until Mai's very specific ideas about that begin to get in the way. Oto, Vik, and specially Yoko seem unable to follow her "rules."
5	5	"It's Mai Castle"	Rishat Gilmetdinov	Leo Murzenko	16 September 2016
Mai works hard building a great sandcastle that she'd just like to protect it from getting wrecked. Thanks to Yoko's magic, Mai gets to have her castle all to herself - and it's life size. Very quickly, however, she begins to miss her friends. The only problem is, in their desperation to keep the castle safe, Yoko hasn't included a way in - or out. In the end, it'll take their combined imaginations to find a way out of Mai's castle.
6	6	"Don't Touch"	Juanjo Elordi	Edorta Barruetabeña	19 September 2016
Vik brings his brand new ball to the park. The friends are excited to play with it, but it's so beautiful that he doesn't want anyone touching it. Oto and Mai think that if they can just somehow get Vik to kick the ball with them, Vik will realize that he also wants to play. The teams starts a game in which Yoko uses his magic to build sophisticate security systems.
7	7	"Rocket to the Moon"	Juanjo Elordi	P.Kevin Strader	20 September 2016
Oto decides the gang will play Tag today. Oto corners Mai on the climbing tower. Yoko magically turns the climbing tower into a spaceship and Mai does indeed fly into space. Yoko turns a tree into a super-fast rocket. With Vik and Yoko aboard, Oto's pursues Mai's at high speeds in and out of clouds and to the moon. Then, the ships zoom into a hale of asteroids.
8	8	"The Treasure of Yoko Park"	Juanjo Elordi, Alexey Medvedev, and Alexey Minchenok	Andy Yerkes	21 September 2016
Oto, Vik and Mai are playing pirates today. Oto is ever the swashbuckler, Vik is into the ships, while Mai thinks it's all about the eye patches. When Yoko produces an interactive, magical map - there's one thing they can all agree on. Being a pirate is all about The Treasure.
9	9	"Red Litter Day"	Dzhalil Rizvanov	Leo Murzenko	22 September 2016
The kids head to the beautiful Meadow Gigantico to play tag - when they discover the meadow isn't all that beautiful anymore. Overnight somebody has completely trashed the place - and now the park's most pristine corner is covered with garbage. Ranger Loops will never have a chance to clean it up all by herself. With Yoko's help the clean up turns into a game that leads to something different from their initial expectations, including finding out who caused that mess in the first place.
10	10	"Broken"	Juano Elordi	Edorta Barruetabeña	23 September 2016
Ranger Loops is preparing a box of old items for recycling. Mai suggests playing with some of the broken toys in the box before they are delivered, but Oto thinks that it is silly playing with broken toys. Yoko feels badly for the broken toys, so he makes his magic and turns the three friends into the broken toys themselves, while he takes the shape of the old box.
11	11	"Hiding in Plain Sight"	Rishat Gilmetdinov	P.Kevin Strader	26 September 2016
Mr. Tuttle, a special zoologist, visits Yoko Park. He believes there are strange and unusual creatures in the world that have yet to be discovered. The kids are quite concerned that Tuttle will discover Yoko and take him to a special zoo.
12	12	"Vik on Ice"	Dzhalil Rizvanov	P.Kevin Strader	27 September 2016
Vik doesn't seem to enjoy playing in the snow quite as much as Mai, Oto and Yoko. He doesn't know how to play any winter sports. Everyone thinks ice-skating will be the right winter sport for Vik. At the lake, tVik learns the basics of skating.
13	13	"Vik Plays with Others"	Juanjo Elordi	Edorta Barruetabeña	28 September 2016
Oto and Mai walk to the meadow, where they are supposed to meet Vik. But from the distance they see that their friend is playing blind-man's bluff with other kids. Yoko appears and Mai and Otto play an incredible Red Light Green Light game to attract Vik. One by one they attract all the kids that are playing with Vik, except Vik, who keeps waiting in the meadows.
14	14	"Winner Wonderland"	Rishat Gilmetdinov	Evgenia Golubeva	29 September 2016
It's the summer. Yoko's not having it; he creates a Winter Wonderland and the "Race to the Pole" begins. It's Yoko and the children against a team of squirrels. It's all about winter sports. But in the end, the winner is not anyone they're expecting.
15	15	"The Perfect Pet"	Rishat Gilmetdinov	Evgenia Golubeva	30 September 2016
Mai, Oto, and Vik are talking about pets. They would all really like one, but Ranger Loops warns them that pets are "a big responsibility," which is, of course, exactly what their parents are always saying. The ranger suggests they try drawing some pets instead. They each draw their "perfect pet" - a cat, a parrot and a unicorn. And Yoko, inspired, turns a nearby sparrow into a wild and wonderful hybrid of all three.
16	16	"The Best Dinosaur"	Dzhalil Rizvanov	Evgenia Golubeva	3 October 2016
Mai, Vik and Oto are playing with little plastic dinosaur toys in the park's sandbox. When Yoko joins the game, he makes the toys real dinosaur size animals and transforms the whole park into Jurassic land. But the children get competitive, determined to figure out whose dinosaur is the best.
17	17	"Paper Planes"	Rishat Gilmetdinov	Leo Murzenko	4 October 2016
Oto, Vik and Mai are all having a great time making and flying paper airplanes in the park today. Vik's does tricks, Oto's goes fast. Mai is insecure about the plane she's made, but they all quickly recognize that her plane is the only one that can truly do it all.
18	18	"The Colours"	Dzhalil Rizvanov	Evgenia Golubeva	5 October 2016
Ranger Loops has given the children a task - paint a birdhouse she's just finished making. The kids are excited, but soon run into a problem. They can't agree which colour to paint it. One wants yellow, one red, and one blue. When Yoko joins them, they decide on a contest to see which color they'll paint it.
19	19	"Yoko 500"	Rishat Gilmetdinov	Leo Murzenko	6 October 2016
Vik, Oto and Mai determine that today, they're going to have a race in the park. Each of them brags that they're sure to be the winner. But when Yoko takes their race to a whole new level with vehicles that mirror each of their points of view on the race, they're put to a serious test, and they have to choose between winning at any cost and helping their friends.
20	20	"The Rainy Day Adventure"	Dzhalil Rizvanov	Evgenia Golubeva	7 October 2016
It's raining. The children hide in Ranger Loops's house and are bored. Vic found table games - Caramels, Hills and stairs, chess. Oto and Mai are sure that it will be uninteresting, but then Yoko appears and turns everything into a real adventure. Children get into the game, and the day passes a lot of fun, despite the weather.
21	21	"The Pyramid Adventure"	Rishat Gilmetdinov	Evgenia Golubeva	10 October 2016
Oto and Vik are playing heroes, and they're continually casting Mai in the role of "damsel in distress." But Mai wants to be a hero as well. And when Yoko brings their adventure to life with a huge Pyramid complete with Indiana Jones-like booby traps and mummies, the boys quickly find out that Mai can be a hero as well.
22	22	"The Robot"	Dzhalil Rizvanov	Evgenia Golubeva	11 October 2016
The children promised Ranger Loops they would create a flowerbed for the upcoming flower festival and, just fooling around, Vik invents a robot to "help" them. Unfortunately it's made of cardboard, and isn't much help at all - Until Yoko comes and makes it the best "Helpbot" in the whole universe ever. Things go awry as Helpbot's "programming" makes him do absolutely everything for the kids - including play. In the end, they decide to redo the flowerbed.
23	23	"Small Safari"	Rishat Gilmetdinov	Sarah Graham Hayes	3 October 2016
Mai brought her camera to the park, and she wants to play Safari today. Ranger Loops thinks this is a great idea, and encourages them to find all the different types of wildlife in the park. The three friends set out together, but to their dismay, they seem to run out of animals to observe very quickly. There are squirrels, ravens, a few ducks.
24	24	"The Little Things"	Dzhalil Rizvanov	Evgenia Golubeva	13 October 2016
Mai, Oto and Vik think they've played everything there is to play in the park. They get bored, idly pushing toys around in the sandbox. But when they lose their toy, Yoko arrives to help. He scales the children down and off they go to find their little toy car. But Yoko gets distracted and loses sight of them. The children and Yoko end up on a crazy adventure with huge squirrels, races in the desert, and being lost in a jungle of grass.
25	25	"Big Dress Up"	Rishat Gilmetdinov	Evgenia Golubeva	14 October 2016
Vik is particularly nervous and over-cautious today. When Ranger Loops gets out a box of old costumes for the children, dress up time begins, and it turns out that Archeologist Vik, Knight Vik and Superhero Vik is willing to try just about anything until he realizes that clothes do not make the man.
26	26	"Circus, Circus"	Dzhalil Rizvanov	Evgenia Golubeva	16 October 2016
Vik comes up with the idea to play circus. Mai, Oto, and Yoko are very keen on it, and each of them finds a perfect role, except Vik. He tries and tries to find something he can do, but he just keeps failing. Luckily, when things start to go wrong in the performance, Vik discovers the circus thing he is good at.
27	27	"Cowboys in Yoko Park"	Unknown	Evgenia Golubeva	16 October 2016
Ranger Loops has a big surprise in the park today: a petting zoo. When the truck arrives with the animals, Loops asks the children to look after things for a moment while she goes to the shed to gather some necessary supplies, as a busload of children is about to come for a visit. But as soon as Loops is gone, Yoko allows the animals to escape. The kids are in a panic, and Yoko, fun-loving as ever, uses his magic to turn the whole situation into a full-on cowboy and cowgirl adventure.
28	28	"Roll with IT"	Unknown	Edorta Barruetabeña	16 October 2016
The three kids play house with Yoko. As soon as they start playing the three boys start changing everything around, putting the house in crazy places and mixing everything up: at first they propose playing cowboy house, then it is space house; later, they want to play pirate house.
29	29	"Happy Birthday, Yoko"	Dzhalil Rizvanov	Evgenia Golubeva	17 October 2016
The kids realize that Yoko has never celebrated his Birthday. Mai, Oto and Vik decide to throw him a proper party but keeping it as a secret. The problem is that they are not sure that the present will be good enough, because it is something made by them. Finally when the surprise is revealed and Yoko's Birthday is in full swing, Yoko opens his present.
30	30	"My Craft"	Juanjo Elordi	Edorta Barruetabeña	18 October 2016
Everybody's making "sandcastles" in the sandbox. Oto tries to make a building but he goes so quickly that the building collapses again and again. Vik and Mai are more patient and they build beautiful buildings, going step by step. Yoko uses his magic, providing the kids with a magic spade that can build gigantic buildings.
31	31	"Storybook Ending"	Juanjo Elordi, Juanma Sánchez	Edorta Barruetabeña	19 October 2016
Mai arrives in the park carrying a brand new storybook, filled with" the most wonderful tales." She asks Vik, who's the best reader, to read them all a tale. Vik and Yoko are mesmerized by the book, but Oto can't believe they're wasting their time in the park reading instead of playing.
32	32	"The Biggest Kite"	Juanjo Elordi, Juanma Sánchez	Cristina Broquetas	20 October 2016
Oto goes to the park with his little cousin Tom. As the older cousin, Oto is put in charge. Since it is a rather windy day, they decide to build and fly some kites. Oto, Mai and Vik build some big ones because they think "bigger is better," but Tom, who has to use whatever is leftover, builds a tiny kite of his own. Once Yoko's magic is triggered, the kites become gliders and the kids spend their afternoon flying on the sky.
33	33	"A Big Fat Mistery"	Juanjo Elordi	Cristina Broquetas	21 October 2016
Lately, the Ravens are acting funny: they are so fat they can't even fly. It seems like somebody has been feeding them. Oto, Vik and Mai decide to investigate this mystery helped by Yoko, who makes them look like real detectives. After questioning some suspects and witnesses and examining some clues, they discover the culprit was Oto. The Ravens were eating the popcorn he couldn't finish - every single day.
34	34	"Mai's Wagon"	Juanjo Elordi, Juanma Sánchez	Cristina Broquetas	23 October 2016
Vik, Oto, and Yoko start to play with the wagon. Then they break the wagon. Using Yoko's magic, they go from fantasy to fantasy trying to keep the truth from Mai. Finally they decide to tell her the truth.
35	35	"Tree of Life"	Juanjo Elordi, Juanma Sánchez	Sarah Graham Hayes	24 October 2016
When a tree in the park is threatened, Yoko helps the kids to see that multiple animals would be affected by its loss. The kids "play" squirrels, birds and fish, and learn the value of each and every tree in the park, and a lesson about how we are connected to the natural world.
36	36	"Castaway"	Rishat Gilmetdinov	Evgenia Golubeva	25 October 2016
Oto stomps off, determined to do what he wants to do, all by himself. He heads off on an imaginative sea adventure, but he ends up stuck on a desert island all by himself. At first it seems like fun, but very quickly he discovers that he misses his friends. Even the company of a funny coconut can't replace them. It's much more fun to play together.
37	37	"Happy Next Birthday!"	Juanjo Elordi, Juanma Sánchez	P.Kevin Strader	26 October 2016
For Vik's sixth birthday Oto and Mai surprise him with a basketball-themed party -- a game Vik thinks he knows a lot about. They form a team: The Yoko Park Cows.
38	38	"Yoko's Computer Game"	Juanjo Elordi, Juanma Sánchez	P.Kevin Strader	28 October 2016
Yoko appears in the park, ready to play - only to find the kids playing a game on Oto's computer tablet called PLAY IN THE PARK. When the computer starts to act up, Yoko volunteers to "fix it". But what he really does is make the kids believe he's magically put them INSIDE the computer game.
39	39	"Grownups"	Juanjo Elordi, Maialen Sarasua Oliden	Edorta Barruetabeña	28 October 2016
Yoko's magic transports the three kids to an office, where they find themselves trapped in a bureaucratic loop with Yoko as a crazy boss due to a misunderstanding of what a grownup is. In the end, they must reconnect Yoko with his more playful self.
40	40	"The Cool Spies"	Juanjo Elordi, Juanma Sánchez	P.Kevin Strader	31 October 2016
Oto and Mai are determined to play an exciting, high-energy game today. Though he has an idea about what he wants to play, Vik feels his idea is not as good, and he goes off without telling his friend what his idea was. Oto and Mai, curious as always, think of another game. They'll be spies.
41	41	"All Together Now"	Juanjo Elordi, Juanma Sánchez	Craig Carlisle	1 November 2016
When Ranger Loops gives Vik and Mai some musical instruments, the two are soon making music and dreaming forming a soon-to-be-famous band. But they can't do this without Oto. Oto, however, has no interest, claiming to not like music until he finally admits that he loves music.
42	42	"All for One, and One for All"	Juanjo Elordi, Juanma Sánchez	Edorta Barruetabeña	2 November 2016
Each kid wants to play a different game, and as they just can't come to an agreement, each one plays by his or her own game. Each one tries to attract Yoko and, as a result, make his/her game bigger and more fun. But the competition among them is so fierce that they lose control of the games and the three games collide.
43	43	"Cloudy Day"	Juanjo Elordi, Juanma Sánchez	Cristina Broquetas	3 November 2016
It's a very hot day and the kids are lying in the field, looking for shapes in the clouds. Of course, everyone sees something different in each cloud. An exhausted Ranger Loops joins them for a moment, and quickly dozes off. Yoko, meanwhile, arrives and gets a little too into the game, bringing the cloud animals to life in the park.
44	44	"Snowball"	Juanjo Elordi	Andy Yerkes	4 November 2016
Winter is winding down, but Mai and Oto dearly wish for one last snowfall before springtime arrives in earnest. With a little Yoko magic, they get their wish. The only problem is, Vik, thinking that spring is finally here, is all revved up to show his pals his new favorite game: baseball.
45	45	"Perfect Picnic"	Dzhalil Rizvanov	Evgenia Golubeva	7 November 2016
It's a miracle. Oto, Mai and Vik all agree on the day's chosen activity: they're going to have a picnic. But they soon find that there's still one thing about the picnic that they can't seem to agree upon: where to have it. Yoko takes them on a magical trip exploring picnic sites - both on Earth and off - until they realize that each of them has to bend a bit on their own idea of a "perfect" picnic before that they can have a picnic that all of them can enjoy.
46	46	"The Yoko Workout"	Juanjo Elordi, Juanma Sánchez	P.Kevin Strader	7 November 2016
There is a new Obstacle Course in Yoko Park a fun way to stay active and be healthy. For the opening, Ranger Loops will hold a race to see who can go through the obstacles fastest. Oto wants to be in tip-top shape for it, so he chooses a traditional workout with the Ranger and Ronnie the Workout guy. Vik and Mai have a very active adventure with Yoko as they searching for the imaginary Jewel of the Jungle.
47	47	"An A-Mazing Winter Adventure"	Juanjo Elordi, Juanma Sánchez	Andy Yerkes	8 November 2016
It's a wintry day in the park, and Oto, Vik and Mai are having great fun making a snow fort. Ranger Loops comes along with exciting news: she's planning to have a puppet show in a bit in the cabin. She hands them a flyer, which gives a hint at the story. Two knights and a snow princess must find their way through a Snow Beast's labyrinth of ice and snow. The flyer blows away, and the kids, always mindful of keeping the park clean, chase after it.
48	48	"Hello Nature"	Juanjo Elordi	Cristina Broquetas	14 November 2016
After observing how hard Ranger Loops works, the kids decide that they'll be Rangers for one day. They focus on keeping people from doing things that may harm the park, but somehow they get a little power-mad, and people in the park, not too fond of their bossiness, start leaving in droves. When the kids see the park so lonely and sad, they realize they need to rethink their methods. With Yoko's magic, they go back in time and start from scratch.
49	49	"Vik Saves the Day"	Juanjo Elordi, Juanma Sánchez	Claudia Silver	19 November 2016
Vik wants to play superheroes. He comes charging into the park with a towel pinned around his neck, ready to play. His friends, however, have other things going on: Mai is helping Ranger Loops to "save" some sunflowers by transplanting them to an area with more sun, and Oto is reliving his heroics in his championship soccer win. It seems to Vik that his friends are really heroic, while he's just the same old Vik, running around with a towel around his neck. Yoko responds by making both of them real superheroes.
50	50	"Doppelgangers"	Juanjo Elordi, Juanma Sánchez	Cristina Broquetas	21 November 2016
The kids are playing soccer. Suddenly Oto decides that what they need is to play another team - so that they can play together. Yoko responds by magically creating doubles of our three kids: another Mai, another Oto and another Vik. They're very excited, but once they start playing, the real Mai, Vik and Oto see their own behavior mirrored by their doppelgangers.
51	51	"What's That Smell?"	Juanjo Elordi, Juanma Sánchez	Cristina Broquetas	23 November 2016
Ranger Loops is so proud of her flowers - it is spring, and everything is in bloom. People have come from far and wide to look at her marvelous work, and, of course, to breathe in the heavenly scent. Soon, however, they realize that there is something that smells horrible somewhere, overpowering the sweet scent of her blossoms. When the kids discover that the stink is coming from Yoko, who, as it turns out, has never taken a bath in his life.
52	52	"Outer Space Rocks"	Juanjo Elordi, Juanma Sánchez	Cristina Broquetas	25 November 2016
Oto wants to play with his frisbee and Vik wants to play rock collecting. Yoko's magic turns the frisbee into a flying saucer, sending the kids into outer space. Oto's happy because he thinks he's won, but clever Yoko lands them on a rocky planet. Now Vik thinks his choice has won out. The kids have many adventures in space until Oto and Yoko get in trouble with some rocks creatures.

=== Season 2 (2019) ===
Story	Episode	Title	Directed by	Written by	Release Date
53	1	"Sleep Well, Mr. Bear"	Dzhalil Rizvanov	Evgenia Golubeva	22 July 2019
It's winter and many animals in the Park are hibernating. But Oto can't stop himself from being noisy and he wakes them up. Now the children and Yoko must find a way to help the animals fall asleep again. They try to put the animals back to bed by creating a Dreamland with clouds, stars and sheep to count. They sing lullabies.
54	2	"Busy Bees"	Dzhalil Rizvanov	Evgenia Golubeva	23 July 2019
A bee swarm has arrived in the park. Yoko asks the bees to leave the park. But things change - flowers don't grow, the natural order of things is broken. Ranger Loops is worried. Yoko and the children go on a quest to apologize and get the bees back. They even meet the queen bee. Finally all the bees come back to the park and everything goes back to normal.
55	3	"A Simple Rescue"	Dzhalil Rizvanov	Edorta Barruetabeña	24 July 2019
One day, Oto and Mai help an old lady rescue her puppy from some bushes. Later, a little girl goes missing and Ranger Loops and two policemen organize a search party. The kids want to help but the policemen tell them that a rescue is not a game.
56	4	"At Ease"	Dzhalil Rizvanov	Edorta Barruetabeña	25 July 2019
Mai wants to teach her friends a dance routine. Vik and Yoko like the idea and try to learn the dance. Vik suggests doing a more energetic dance, with ninja movements. Yoko conjures up a colored dance floor, like a dance video-game. They challenge Oto to pass the first level.
57	5	"Delivery Service"	Stanislav Dobrovsky	Evgenia Golubeva	26 July 2019
Oto and friends volunteer to help Ranger Loops deliver a parcel. Mai and Vik are determined to prove to Oto that delivering things can be fun. Thanks to Yoko's magic the kids' delivery service becomes a real adventure with trains, chases and crows wanting to grab the bird food parcel for themselves.
58	6	"The Three Little Friends"	Juanjo Elordi	Edorta Barruetabeña	30 July 2018
Two little kids ask Mai to read them the story of "The Three Little Pigs". Mai doesn't want to admit that she can't read and pretends that she is reading, but she is suffering so much that Yoko decides to help her by putting some pictures in the book to guide her. The three pigs in Mai's story look like Mai, Oto and Vik, and each of them tries to improve the role of the pig that resembles them. Finally, when all the characters are happy with the story, even the two little kids, Mai confesses that she can't read yet, but will be able to someday, because she is learning.
59	7	"Back to School"	Rishat Gilmetdinov	Evgenia Golubeva	31 July 2019
Tomorrow is the first day back at school after the holidays. Yoko doesn't know what school is, so Mai and Vik decide to set up a pretend classroom to explain it to him. Oto joins in and - thanks to Yoko's magic - becomes the head teacher. Although at first he is convinced he has much better ideas about how to run a school, Oto struggles with the reality of the task and ends up losing all his pupils on a school outing to the jungle.
60	8	"Oto's Dinosaur"	Juanjo Elordi	Edorta Barruetabeña	18 August 2019
Vik has a new wristwatch and is learning to tell the time. Yoko tries to learn how the watch works, but its hands move too slowly for him and, bored, he creates a time machine. The kids travel to different times, finally arriving in the Jurassic Period. Oto finds a small orphan dinosaur and decides to bring it back to the park. Oto realizes that each animal belongs in its own environment.
61	9	"Excellence Award"	Juanjo Elordi	Evgenia Golubeva	22 August 2019
Mai and Oto come to the Park and show off their recent awards to Vik. Ranger Loops passes by and tells them that the Park has been given an Excellence Award, too. Vik really wants to win an award as well. Mai, Oto and Yoko invent competitions for Vik so he can get his own award. But he keeps coming second because he always ends up helping his friends. Mai, Oto and Yoko give Vik the "Best Friend Award".
62	10	"The Puddle"	Juanjo Elordi	Juanjo Elordi	22 August 2019
The three friends play around a small puddle by the lake with their toys. Oto has a can of salt that his parents gave him to build "a hangar". To avoiding having to go over to the litter bin, which is too far away, he empties the salt into the puddle. Suddenly, Oto realizes that several goldfish and tadpoles are looking ill and trying to escape from the water. Vik runs to warn Ranger Loops while the others try to save the animals.
63	11	"Yoko Park Inspector"	Juanjo Elordi	Evgenia Golubeva	25 August 2019
There is a Park Inspector in Yoko Park. The children and Yoko are on a mission to make sure she loves the park, but she keeps putting red stickers everywhere. It seems as if she doesn't like Yoko Park at all. But when she gets involved in the children's and Yoko's imaginative games, it turns out that this lady is not what she seems. It turns out that the red stickers were there to mark what she loved about the park. And it turns out she loved pretty much everything.
64	12	"Gift-Giving Day"	Juanjo Elordi	Edorta Barruetabeña	25 August 2019
The year comes to an end and Mai does not know what gift to ask for. Vik does not ask for any gifts at this time of year, because his parents have other customs. Oto has asked for a day at the Crazy Cars Amusement Park, but his parents want him to ask for something more sensible. Mai thinks that maybe it is more exciting to give presents than to receive them. Ranger Loops listens to the children and proposes a game: Secret Santa drawings made of recycled material.
65	13	"The Best Toy in the World"	Juanjo Elordi	Evgenia Golubeva	28 August 2019
The children can't decide what would be the best toy in the world - Vik's transformer? Mai's pencil? Or Oto's ball? When Yoko arrives he offers them a wooden stick. With Yoko's magic, it turns out that a wooden stick can be all sorts of things: a sword, a bridge, a stickman, a pole with a flag, a snake, a brush, a raft, a magic wand.
66	14	"The Play"	Juanjo Elordi	Edorta Barruetabeña	22 October 2019
An amphitheater has been built in the park and Ranger Loops has organized a children's theatre marathon for the opening day. Mai wants to participate in it, but Vik and Oto have doubts: Vik is embarrassed to act in front of people and Oto is bad at memorizing lines. But Yoko loves the idea, so finally they decide to participate. The show begins and when the friends' turn comes, Oto forgets all his lines, although luckily Mai is able to improvise by integrating Oto's doubts into the play.

=== Season 3 (2020) ===
==== Maya Knows ====
The premiere of the first four episodes of educational series spin-off Maya Knows started on 30 April 2020 exclusively in the social network VK. Each episode features a new outlook to the Yoko series through the singular character Maya. In each episode, the characters encounter a new topic to explore. Maya tells her friends one informative and interesting fact about the world around her. From painting, French cuisine, to history of photography the series presents the details of Maya's knowledge of these themes along with different characters such as Yoko and a squirrel.

Special #	Title	Directed By	Written By	Original air date
1	"Landscape"	Daniiar Iambushev	Daniiar Iambushev	30 April 2020
In the first series, Maya finds out what a landscape is and how it conveys the artist's feelings.
2	"Fairy Tales"	Stanislav Dobrovski, Daniiar Iambushev	Stanislav Dobrovski, Daniiar Iambushev	2 May 2020
Maya reads the different fairytales with Yoko and the squirrel. To explore more fairy tales, Maya heads to the library.
3	"French Cuisine"	Daniiar Iambushev	Daniiar Iambushev	4 May 2020
Maya learns about the French cuisine. Later they dine with a squirrel.
4	"History of Photography"	Daniiar Iambushev	Daniiar Iambushev, Pavel Kalinichenko	6 June 2020
The friends learn amazing facts about the history of photography, from the distant past to the present. They take a montage of pictures with a camera.
5	"Gravity"	Daniiar Iambushev	Stanislav Dobrovski	7 September 2020
Maya learns about physics and the effects of gravity on a dropping apple. Yoko stays asleep while the squirrel keeps on dropping apples. To enliven the situation, Maya tells Yoko the story of how in the moon, gravity causes everything to float. Yoko finds this story fascinating, and tries to gravitate by meditating. However, he falls down after a few seconds.
6	"Dinosaurs"	Daniiar Iambushev	Stanislav Dobrovski	14 September 2020
Maya and Yoko learn about dinosaurs. Dinosaurs ranging from land to the aerial forms are studied.
7	"Rain"	Daniiar Iambushev	Stanislav Dobrovski	21 September 2020
Maya and Yoko find themselves in a rainstorm. This was the perfect situation to learn more about rain. They learn that the sun evaporates water of the ocean into water vapor creating clouds. Then the clouds cause precipitation in terms of rainfall. They also learn that there could be more forms of precipitation. In the end, Yoko sends his umbrella to the sky, and a new precipitation in the form of stars appear.
9	"Ants"	Daniiar Iambushev	Stanislav Dobrovski	5 October 2020
Maya uses a magnifying glass to study ants. The ants ecosystem and regimented lifestyle is described.
10	"Solar Eclipse"	Daniiar Iambushev	Stanislav Dobrovski	12 October 2020
It is the time for the solar eclipse. The Moon slowly glides over the path of the Sun. The friends await the magical event with eclipse glasses.
11	"Ukulele"	Daniiar Iambushev	Daniiar Iambushev	19 October 2020
Maya strums the ukulele. Yoko and the squirrel listen to Maya how the ukulele was used as an entertainer in tropical islands throughout history. Yoko magically turns the park into a tropical island. Yoko becomes a ukulele rock star while Maya and the squirrel have a tropical island attire. They all dance to a new ukulele song.
12	"The Distribution of Debris"	Daniiar Iambushev	Daniiar Iambushev	26 October 2020
Maya recycles the debris at the park into the right recycling canisters. They are paper, plastic, metal. Yoko and the squirrel also contribute to the recycling process. Yoko not only recycles but also converts the recyclables into a playground.

== TV Channels and Online platforms ==
Channel	Country
CTC	Russia
O!	Russia
Carousel	Russia
Tlum	Russia
Mult	Russia
Da Vinci (English text)
Clan TV	Spain
EITB	Spain
RTVE	Spain
BBC Kids	Canada
Canal Panda	Portugal
Nick Jr. Channel	Italy
Netflix	Italy, Spain, Portugal, UK, US, Russia, Canada and the Indian Subcontinent
Huashi TV	China
Sun TV	India
Nat Geo Kids	Latin America and the Caribbean
Baraem	Qatar
Jeem TV	Qatar
ETV	Estonia
MiniMini+	Poland
VTM Kids Jr.	Belgium
Anione	South Korea
Anibox	South Korea
Champ TV	South Korea
Minika Çocuk	Turkey
YLE TV2	Finland
Pixel TV	Ukraine
Kiwi TV	Hungary
Ketnet	Belgium
Nick Jr. Too	United Kingdom
eToonz	South Africa

== Festivals and awards ==
Kanal-o applauded the series' message by stating, "Yoko not only entertains, but also develops. All good children are a little restless and tomboyish. And, sometimes, the spirit of competition leads to quarrels. But Yoko also comes to the rescue. Unobtrusively, in the form of a game, it leads kids to the idea that friendship is more important than victory, and really fun happens only when everyone has fun. With Yoko, any game turns from entertainment to an instructive parable, living through which the characters of the series, and with them the small audience, become a little more adult. Perhaps that is why the cartoon is so popular not only for children, but also for parents."

On 22 March 2015 at Suzdalfest, Yoko was awarded the prize with the category, "Animated Series with the Greatest International Potential." The distinction was tabulated by Reed MIDEM, the organizing body behind content markets MIPTV, MIPCOM, MIPJunior and MIPFormats who previously gave Yoko the same award.

Award	Date of ceremony	Category	Recipient(s) and nominee(s)	Result
Reed MIDEM	2014	Animated Series with the Greatest International Potential	Yoko	Won
Suzdalfest	22 March 2015	Animated Series with the Greatest International Potential	Yoko	Won

== See also ==
- Yoko and His Friends
- Children's television series
- Lists of animated television series
