= Late Night Liars =

- Genre: Game Show
- Created by: Adam Spiegelman; FM DeMarco
- Developed by: Dwight D. Smith; Michael Agbabian
- Written by: Michael Agbabian; Tom Johnson; Grant Taylor; Ray James; Scott King
- Directed by: Lenn Goodside
- Presented by: Larry Miller
- Voices of: Tyler Bunch; Brian Clark; Donna Kimball; Colleen Smith; Victor Yerrid
- Theme music composer: The Elements
- Country of origin: United States
- No. of episodes: 8

Production
- Executive producers: Lisa Henson; Michael Agbabian; Dwight D. Smith
- Production location: Hollywood
- Editor: Michael Karlich
- Production companies: Mission Control Media; Henson Alternative; GSN Original

Original release
- Network: Game Show Network
- Release: June 10 – July 29, 2010

Late Night Liars is an American television game show on Game Show Network (GSN) that was under The Jim Henson Company's Henson Alternative brand and premiered on June 10, 2010. The series was hosted by Larry Miller, and stars several "celebrity" puppets, which were created by The Jim Henson Company. Each episode has two human contestants trying to figure out which of the puppets are lying, and which are telling the truth.

== Characters ==
Five puppet characters regularly participate in the show:

Panelist	Description	Performed by
Shelley Oceans	A loudmouthed puppet with an oversized chest. She is a parody of Joan Rivers. There may also be aspects of Shelley Winters present (references to her many affairs and marriages, etc.)	Donna Kimball
William A. Mummy	A flamboyant mummy who was an ex-husband of Shelley Oceans. He is a parody of Paul Lynde.	Brian Clark
Cashmere Ramada	A ditzy pink poodle with sunglasses. She is a parody of Paris Hilton.	Colleen Smith
Sir Sebastian Simian	A monkey with a British accent that heads a record-producing company. He is a parody of Simon Cowell. He is a recycled version of Joey the Monkey from Late Night Buffet with Augie and Del.	Tyler Bunch
Weasel	The show's announcer. He ostensibly determines the value of the first two rounds based on some personal fact about himself, one of the panelists, or a random piece of trivia.	Victor Yerrid

In addition, the following puppets representing real-life celebrities have been panelists on certain episodes.

Panelist	Description	Performed by	Featured episode
Mickey Rourke Muppet	A guest puppet replacing Sir Sebastian Simian for one episode. He is a redressed version of the Nerd Girl from Puppet Up!	Tyler Bunch	Episode 3
Rosie O'Donnell Muppet	A guest puppet replacing Shelley Oceans for one episode. She is a redressed version of a female Whatnot from The Wubbulous World of Dr. Seuss.	Donna Kimball	Episode 5

== Gameplay ==
=== Round 1 ===
In round 1, host Larry Miller gives a category, and the puppet panelists each give one answer. Two of the panelists are giving real answers, and the other two are lying. After all four panelists give an answer, the contestants secretly and simultaneously pick one panelist that they think is lying. If a contestant selects a liar, he or she wins a pre-stated amount of money as announced by announcer Weasel, usually in the range of $500 to $600.

=== Round 2 ===
Round 2 is played the same as round 1, except that three panelists are giving true answers and one is lying. Correctly selecting the liar earns the contestant a pre-stated amount of money, usually in the range of $800 to $900, although one episode's second round was worth $797.

=== Round 3 ===
In Round 3, each contestant, starting with the current leader, selects one panelist, who gives a statement relating to the category given by host Miller. The contestant must then determine if the statement is true or a lie. If the contestant correctly judges the statement, a computer randomizer (dubbed the "Randomometer") is activated, when the contestant presses a button, the reels stop, revealing a cash amount greater than $100 (the upper limit is never clearly established; however, the screen has spaces for four digits). At the end of this round, the contestant with more money wins the game and keeps the money; the losing contestant receives a consolation prize (usually a product made by Telebrands) and $500 in cash, regardless of their score. The winning contestant also plays the "Two Topic Showdown" for a larger cash prize (from $10,000 up to $25,000).

=== Two Topic Showdown (Bonus Round) ===
The two panelists that did not participate in round 3 are each assigned a subject by host Miller. They alternate giving statements, the night's winner must determine whether the statement is true or a lie when applied to that panelist's subject. For each correct response, the contestant wins $500, if the contestant gives eight correct responses within 43 seconds, he or she wins the announced grand prize amount, prior to the last break, host Miller initially announces it to be $10,000, however, Weasel occasionally interrupts him to increase or reduce the amount, usually by very little; from $9,993 (eighth aired episode) to $10,004 (fourth aired episode). Episodes with special guest puppets have had higher cash prizes of $25,000 (Rourke episode) and $20,000 (O'Donnell episode), respectively.

== Later appearances ==
- Colleen Smith occasionally reprises Cashmere Ramada for specific Puppet Up! shows.
- Cashmere Ramada and Shelley Oceans appeared in the Neil's Puppet Dreams episode "Dream Bump." Cashmere Ramada was seen as a dancer while Shelly Oceans was seen as a drag queen (performed by Allan Trautman).
