= Yoko and His Friends =

- Theatrical release poster
- Spanish: Yoko y sus amigos
- Basque: Yoko eta lagunak
- Russian: Йоко и друзья
- Directed by: Juanjo Elordi; Rishat Gilmetdinov (ru); Iñigo Berasategui; Alexey Medvedev
- Written by: Edorta Barruetabeña; Craig Carlisle; P. Kevin Strader; Andy Yerkes
- Based on: Yoko
- Produced by: Juanjo Elordi; Elena Gozalo; Alexander Mirgorodskiy; Yuri Moskvin; Vladimir Nikolaev; Ricardo Ramón; Iurre Tellería
- Starring: Tyler Bunch; Eva Ojanguren; Jaione Intxausti; Arantxa Moñux; Kiko Jáuregui; Josu Mitxelena; Aintzane Krujeiras; Loinaz Jáuregui
- Edited by: Alexandria Aleksashina; Andrey Galat; Alatzne Portu; Maialen Sarasua Oliden
- Music by: Michael Richard Plowman
- Animation by: Ricardo Ramón; Elena Prozorova; Nicholas Lobov
- Production companies: Dibulitoon Studio (es); Somuga; Wizart Animation; Yokoren Kluba
- Distributed by: Barton Films
- Release date: 13 November 2015
- Running time: 80 minutes
- Countries: Spain; Russia
- Languages: Spanish; Basque; Russian

Yoko and His Friends (Spanish: Yoko y sus amigos, Basque: Yoko eta lagunak, Russian: Йоко и друзья) is a 2015 animated children's film based on the TV series Yoko. The film is directed by Juanjo Elordi, Rishat Gilmetdinov and Iñigo Berasategui with a script of Edorta Barruetabeña. Animation studios Yokoren Kluba, Spain's Somuga and Dibulitoon Studio and Russia's Wizart Animation produced the film. Distributed by Barton Films in Spain, the film was intended as a children's movie for the ages 4–8 years. The original was dubbed in Basque and it premiered on 13 November 2015 in 52 theaters.

== Plot ==
This is the third time that Vik and his family have moved to a different city. Vik is a shy boy who finds it hard to make new friends, and whenever he finally does start to open up to someone, his father's job inevitably causes the family to relocate to a different part of the country, and Vik has to start all over again. Luckily for him, this time he soon meets Mai and Oto in the city park.

The enthusiasm and energy with which they play end up attracting the attention of a magical rabbit-like creature who lives in the park: Yoko. Every day, after school, Vik runs to the park to meet his friends and go on amazing adventures, thanks to which he finally starts to feel that he's found his place in the world. Vik is happy at last, until one day his father is offered a job in another city.

== Cast ==
Character	Spanish Voice	Russian Voice
Yoko	Tyler Bunch	Tyler Bunch
Marisol / Oto / Mitya	Eva Ojanguren	Svetlana Permyakova Vladimir Voityuk
Nadiya / Mai / Maya	Jaione Intxausti	Vasilisa Eldarova Anastasia Lapina
Vik	Arantxa Moñux	Andrey Yanayt
Abhay	Kiko Jáuregui	Kiko Jáuregui
Markus	Josu Mitxelena	Daniel Eldarov
Itziar	Aintzane Krujeiras	Aintzane Krujeiras
Kristina	Loinaz Jáuregui	Elena Shulman

== Production ==
=== Development ===
A movie based on the TV series was launched in 2015 titled Yoko and Friends (Yoko y sus amigos). The Basque title was Yoko eta lagunak. The film also had a Russian version. Ever since 2011 director Juanjo Elordi who was in charge of children's programming for Euskal Telebisa detected a void in children's production aimed for the years 4–8. At the media group, Elordi collaborated with writer Edorta Barruetabeña to produce a film from the Yoko TV series. Elordi has directed many animated film including Olentzero: A Christmas Carol.

The idea was sprouted as early as 2011 when the materials were prepared. Elordi wanted to fill the gap of children's programming that major companies previously never thought of venturing. Initial ideas were about how children play in cities. The main character would be conceptualized thereafter - Yoko who is described as a mysterious forest yellow giant invisible to humans but visible as a playful being to children. A partnership between Spain's Dibulitoon Studio and Somuga studios was starting to be prepared with Barruetabeña bringing in animation studio Yokoren Kluba. In 2014 Cannes, there was a meeting with Russian animation team Wizart Animation led by Rishat Gilmetdinov. The Russian team liked the Basque project and was willing for a partnership. The idea for the Yoko series and the film would later be developed by the studios from the two countries. Despite the challenges, both teams were able to collaborate with comfortable degree of interaction and communication. The final animation producers were Yokoren Kluba, Somuga, Dibulitoon and Wizart Animation with the participation of EITB.

The film is dedicated to the Basque Country, Spain and Russia. The film is derived to get the best out of education. The characters are depicted as naturally playful due to the character Yoko only talking in one word, "Yoko" or Basque for game. The film will emphasize the story of the character Vik, with explanations of different themes such as the effect of relocation to urban cities, the effect of technology and the psychological effects of playing outdoors. The film will explore discussions ranging from security and freedom associated with outdoor play in the big cities.

From Russia, Rishat Gilmetdinov wrote the screenplay with Edorta Barruetabeña who is known for the film Durangko. Ricardo Ramón was production designer who received the El Festival El Chupete Special Award for the film. The film is stitched together using different small stories and is intended to make the children realize outdoor play is a safe space, that when utilized is critical for the development of emotional, social and physical development of children. Naiz media group published a report by director Juanjo Elordi and writer Edorta Barruetabeña on the importance of outdoor play.

Eva Ojanguren, Jaione Intxausti and Arantxa Moñux were in charge of giving voice to the protagonists while, H.D. Quinn, a voice actor from the Pokémon series voiced the character Yoko for all the versions of the film.

=== Theatrical ===
The film was released in Basque Country and Spain on 13 September 2015 through the distribution partner Barton Films. The First Exhibition of Ephemeral Cinema intended for ingenious films that did not have a thorough representation at the box office was presented on 11 March 2016 at Moralzarzal. Yoko and His Friends was selected for the exhibition. On 6 April 2016, a screening was held at Castrillón, Spain. The Cavalcade Madrid Parade of January 2017 featured floats derived from the character of Clan TV channel's shows. Constructed entirely by RTVE workers, one of the float was Yoko and His Friends. To increase distribution to other countries, in 2018 global TV distributor Jetpack Distribution and Wizart Animation signed with Nat Geo Kids Latin America to bring the movie as well as the TV series to Latin America and the Caribbean. The film is available on Netflix.

=== Animation ===
Animation of the characters are uniquely constructed using square frameworks. The straight lines lend the characters ease of visualization. The characters are unusually organized through their limbs because they were designed around square geometrical framework. In order to feature a bending motion to the characters, a special animated muscular curve was made over fitted on their polygonal grid animated framework. A review noted its "colorful aesthetic and angular characters that are part-Cubeecraft, part-Lego."

== Reception ==
=== Critical response ===
The film released simultaneously with the TV broadcast. The movie was one of the three top-performing shows for Clan Internacional, the high ranking commercial-free HD children's channel from RTVE in Spain.

Reviews for the film were positive with special emphasis given to how it conveys children's special ability to turn settings into magical outdoor play environments. Alfredo Manteca for Videodromo believed the film is a benchmark in both animation style and story telling for young children: "Yoko and His Friends is an absolute vindication of the park as a leisure center for children." The reviewer acknowledged the city life has changed society considerably but the film reminds parents that children's ability to play outside has never been banished. In terms of animation, "they bet on groundbreaking, modern, geometric and colorful settings that will surely attract the attention of children." Alicia Arribas for El Confidencial noted the film "reminds parents that there is nothing more fun than a child's imagination and that there is no space that cannot become magical, even if it is an inhospitable city."

In Argentina, at the 16 April 2016 Buenos Aires International Festival of Independent Cinema the film premiered at the Little Bafici section. A review for BAFICI, explained the film is "an invitation to play outside, far from the illuminated screens, with other children. That is Yoko and His Friends, is healthy as a plate of vegetables in its values and delicious as assorted candy." At the Canary Islands, the film was one of the four selection at the children's section The Magic Lantern for the Las Palmas de Gran Canaria International Film Festival.

== Accolades ==
The film has won or has been nominated for a host of accolades. At the Seville European Film Festival 2015, the children and youth audience of the Europa Junior section awarded the Giraldillo Junior awarded to the directors of Yoko and His Friends. The Spanish Film Academy nominated the Basque film for best animation at the 2016 Goya Awards. The international festival known as El Festival El Chupete (El Pacuete Festival) of children's media and communications in Spain awarded the Special Award to Yoko y sus amigos.

Award	Date of ceremony	Category	Recipient(s) and nominee(s)	Result
Seville European Film Festival	14 November 2015	Giraldillo Junior Award	Juanjo Elordi Rishat Gilmetdinov	Won
Círculo de Escritores Cinematográficos	1 February 2016	Animated Feature Film	Juanjo Elordi Rishat Gilmetdinov	Nominated
Goya Awards	6 February 2016	Best Animated Film	Alexander Mirgorodskiy Vladimir Nikolaev, Yuri Moskvin Juan José Elordi, Ricardo Ramón	Nominated
El Festival El Chupete	6 July 2016	Special Award	Ricardo Ramón	Won

== See also ==
- List of animated feature films of 2015
- List of Spanish films of 2015
- Educational entertainment
