= List of regional animation festivals =

This is a list of past and present regional animation festivals. These festivals include only animation and generally limit their submissions to a particular region of the world, or even a single country. They often show a program of independent, student, and commercial work.

Name	Est.	City (or other location)	Country	Region of focus
Asian Animation Film Festival	2006	Chicago	United States	Asia
Kecskemét Animation Film Festival	1985	Kecskemét	Hungary	Hungary
Open Russian Festival of Animated Film	1996	Suzdal	Russia	Russia and Belarus

== See also ==
- List of anime conventions
- List of international animation festivals
