= Brad Breeck =

American composer

- Born: Illinois, U.S.
- Education: California Institute of the Arts
- Genres: Film and television scores, electronic, rock, art punk
- Occupations: Composer, songwriter, musician
- Instruments: Keyboards, synthesizer, guitar
- Years active: 2002–present
- Website: bradbreeck.com

Bradley Joseph Breeck is an American composer and songwriter best known for his work with Disney Television Animation. He wrote the theme song for Gravity Falls and Star vs. the Forces of Evil, and has written the scores for numerous TV shows and films from several companies.

== Career ==
Brad Breeck was originally a member of the Los Angeles-based experimental punk band The Mae Shi, which he joined while he was studying at the California Institute of the Arts. In 2007, he left the band to focus on making music for TV and films. In 2011, he formed another band called Skull Tape. He is influenced from a wide variety of musical styles and grew up listening to mostly Christian heavy metal. He began working for Disney full-time when he pitched the Gravity Falls theme song to Disney Channel.

In 2017, Breeck won a Golden Reel Award for Best Sound Editing for the Nickelodeon TV film Albert.

== Filmography ==
=== Films ===
- Someone's Knocking at the Door (2009)
- One Too Many Mornings (2010)
- Bad Fairy (as Brad Joseph Breeck) (2012)
- Damaged Gods (as Brad Joseph Breeck) (2014)
- Albert (2016)
- Lucky (2019)
- The Yucca Sisters (2020)
- We Bare Bears: The Movie (2020)
- Secret Magic Control Agency (2021)

=== Television ===
- Shorty McShorts' Shorts (2006) (3 episodes)
- Random! Cartoons (2007–2009) (2 episodes)
- Fanboy & Chum Chum (2009–2012) (52 episodes)
- Bondi Band (2010–2012) (52 episodes; also wrote theme song)
- Awkward. (2011–2016) (55 episodes)
- Gravity Falls (2012–2016) (40 episodes; also wrote the theme song)
- Robot and Monster (2012–2014) (26 episodes; also wrote theme song)
- Randy Cunningham: 9th Grade Ninja (as Brad Joseph Breeck) (2012–2015) (50 episodes; also wrote theme song)
- Star vs. the Forces of Evil (2015–2019) (54 episodes; also wrote theme song)
- We Bare Bears (2015–2019) (140 episodes; end credits)
- Pickle and Peanut (2015–2018) (42 episodes; end credits)
- Whisker Haven (as Brad Joseph Breeck) (2015–2017) (31 episodes)
- Voltron: Legendary Defender (2016–2018) (78 episodes)
- Snezhnaya Koroleva: Khraniteli Chudes (2019 miniseries) (26 episodes)
- The Tales of Wonder Keepers (2019–2021) (78 episodes)
- Glitch Techs (2020) (19 episodes; also wrote theme song)
- The Owl House (2021–2023) (24 episodes)
- The Smurfs (2021–present) (156 episodes; also wrote theme song)
- Trivia Quest (2022) (30 episodes; also wrote theme song)
- Kiff (2023–present) (60 episodes; also wrote theme song)
- StuGo (2025) (20 episodes; also wrote theme song)
- Stranger Things: Tales from '85 (2026) (10 episodes; Stranger Things themes by Kyle Dixon and Michael Stein)
