= Albert (2016 film) =

2016 television film directed by Max Lang

- Written by: Will Eisenberg; Aaron Eisenberg; Joe Stillman
- Directed by: Max Lang
- Starring: Bobby Moynihan; Sasheer Zamata; Judah Friedlander; Rob Riggle
- Music by: Brad Breeck (score); Michelle R. Lewis & Dan Petty (songs)
- Country of origin: United States
- Original language: English

Production
- Executive producers: Will McRobb; Chris Viscardi
- Producer: MacGregor Middleton
- Running time: 43 minutes
- Production company: Nickelodeon Productions

Original release
- Network: Nickelodeon
- Release: December 9, 2016

Albert is a 2016 American CGI Christmas musical comedy television film produced by Nickelodeon Animation Studio. It premiered on December 9, 2016, and is Nickelodeon's first animated television film to not be based on a previous show since The Electric Piper.

== Premise ==
Albert, a small Douglas fir tree, sets out on an adventure to become the most famous Christmas tree in his hometown.

== Plot ==
Albert, a small Douglas fir tree, and his best friend, Maisie, escape Earth Mama’s, and get to Cactus Pete’s restaurant. They see Cactus Pete stuck in the snow, and they help him get his head out. Cactus Pete suddenly decides to murder the two for no reason, so gets his cactus gang to shoot needles at them, and the whole fight ends up with Pete getting shredded and Albert and Maisie escaping on a blimp to Empire City. They see the tree, but Pete returned and survived! Pete fights them again, but is thrown in the garbage and quits. Meanwhile, Albert gets up to the top of the tree. Albert sees Pete, and despite him being a backstabbing friend who tried to kill Albert for seemingly no reason, Albert lets Pete be the top of the Empire City tree. Albert and Maisie leave, and go back to Earth Mama’s.

== Cast ==
- Bobby Moynihan as Albert, a small Douglas fir tree who wants to become the Empire City Christmas tree
- Sasheer Zamata as Maisie, a very positive corn plant, hence the name, and Albert's girlfriend
- Judah Friedlander as Gene, a weed and Albert's best friend who is disliked by everybody
- Cheri Oteri as Linda
- Rob Riggle as Cactus Pete/Roy, the main antagonist who loathes Christmas, because he is taken out of the spotlight of his restaurant for a month, and seeks revenge on Christmas trees.
- Tom Kenny as Horton
- Breanna Yde as Molly, a helpful young girl who believes that Albert can do big things.
- John DiMaggio as Donny, Molly's father.
- Mary Pat Gleason as Earth Mama, Molly's grandmother and the caretaker of Albert, Maisie and the rest of the plants.

== Premiere ==
Albert premiered on Nickelodeon on December 9, 2016. It also premiered on Nicktoons the following day.

=== Home media ===
The television film was released on DVD in Region 1 on November 14, 2017 by Paramount Home Entertainment. It was then released on DVD in Region 2 on October 29, 2018 by Paramount Home Entertainment.

== Book ==
Aaron and Will Eisenberg, the film's screenwriters, have written a book based on it, Albert: The Little Tree with Big Dreams, to anticipate the premiere of the film.
