= Tyler Bunch =

American puppeteer

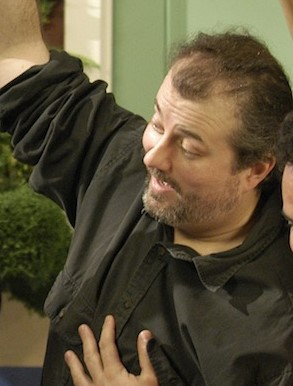
- Bunch on the set of Oobi in 2004
- Born: Tahlequah, Oklahoma, U.S.
- Other name: H.D. Quinn
- Occupations: Puppeteer, puppet designer, director, actor, voice actor
- Years active: 1993–present

Tyler Bunch, also known as H.D. Quinn, is an American puppeteer, director, and actor.

== Career ==
Since 1993, Bunch has been a puppet performer for The Jim Henson Company and The Muppets Studio. Under the pseudonym H.D. Quinn, he has provided voiceovers for several video games and English anime dubs such as Pokémon, Yu-Gi-Oh!, and Lu Over the Wall. From 2007 to 2008, Bunch served as director on the PBS Kids television series SeeMore's Playhouse.

== Filmography ==
=== Film ===
Year	Title	Role	Notes
1999	Muppets from Space	Additional Muppets	Performer
2005	The Muppets' Wizard of Oz	Janice, Old Tom	Performer; television film
2005	The Producers	Pigeon	Puppeteer
2008	Abby in Wonderland	Bottle	Performer; direct-to-DVD film
2011	The Muppets	Foozie, Thog, Additional Muppet Performer	Performer
2011	KikoRiki: Team Invincible	Pin, Docko	English dub; credited as H.D. Quinn
2012	Pokémon the Movie: Kyurem vs. the Sword of Justice	Cobalion	English dub; credited as H.D. Quinn
2014	Muppets Most Wanted	Bulls	Performer
2015	Yoko and His Friends	Yoko	Credited as H.D. Quinn
2016	Sheep & Wolves	Belgur, Bucho	English dub
2016	Your Name	Teshigawara's Father	English dub; credited as H.D. Quinn
2016	Pokémon the Movie: Volcanion and the Mechanical Marvel	Hawlucha	English dub; credited as H.D. Quinn
2017	Pokémon the Movie: I Choose You!	Additional voices	English dub; credited as H.D. Quinn
2017	Fantastic Journey to Oz	General Lan Pirot, Ogre	English dub; credited as H.D. Quinn
2017	Lu Over the Wall	Homeroom Teacher	English dub; credited as H.D. Quinn
2018	Pokémon the Movie: The Power of Us	Lugia, Additional voices	English dub; credited as H.D. Quinn

=== Television ===
Year	Title	Role	Notes
1993–present	Sesame Street	Louie, Rico, Mr. Can You Guess, Prince Cha-Cha-Charming, Joe Doe, Dancing Monsters, Tom Twinkletoes, Ryan, Pre-School Musical announcer, The Big Bad Wolf, Jack the Boss, Max Bear, Minnesota Mel, Super Chicken, Jeff Bawksworthy, Jeff Probst, Ricardo, Additional Muppets	Performer
1997–2006	Bear in the Big Blue House	Treelo, Pop, Doc Hogg, Rocko	Performer
2000–2010	Between the Lions	Walter Pigeon (season 1), Heath the Thesaurus (season 1), Dr. Nitwhite, Johnny, Vowel Boot Camp Letters, Cliff Hanger Narrator (seasons 6-10), Announcer, Pheasant, Vacuum Cleaner Vendor	Performer, voices
2000–2005	Oobi	Grampu	Performer
2001–2003	The Book of Pooh	Tigger	Puppeteer
2002	Law & Order: Criminal Intent	Drew Romney	Episode: "Malignant"
2004–2007	Blue's Room	Dress-Up Chest	Performer
2005	Sheira & Loli's Dittydoodle Works	Zippy the Kwirk, Zimbot	Performer, director (season 1)
2006–2010	It's a Big Big World	Winslow, Riona	Performer
2007–2011	WordWorld	Narrator, Dog, Fly, Duck, Ant	Voice; credited as H.D. Quinn
2007	Jack's Big Music Show	Giant	
2008	A Muppets Christmas: Letters to Santa	Pigeon Mom	Performer; television special
2009–2011	The Electric Company	Special Agent Jack Bowser	Voice
2010–2012	Team Umizoomi	Microraptor, Shape Bandit	Voice
2010	Late Night Liars	Sir Sebastian Simian	Performer
2013	Law and Order: Special Victims Unit	Bert Swanson	Episode: "Her Negotiation"
2013	No, You Shut Up!	Professor L. Chupacabra, Slim Beaumont, The Constitution (1st Time)	Performer
2013–2016	Alisa Knows What to Do!	General Draxpod, Showman	English dub; credited as H.D. Quinn
2014–2017	Wallykazam!	Hortis	Voice
2014–2018	Super 4	Wizard Fourchesac	English dub; credited as H.D. Quinn
2015–2016	The Muppets	Additional Muppets	Performer
2015–2016	Pokémon the Series: XYZ	Lysandre, Ash's Hawlucha, Additional roles	English dub; credited as H.D. Quinn
2016–2017	Pokémon the Series: Sun & Moon	Viren, Professor Kukui's Incineroar, Mudsdale, Additional roles	English dub; credited as H.D. Quinn
2016–2018	Regal Academy	Coach Beast	Voice
2016–2019	Yoko	Yoko	Voice; credited as H.D. Quinn
2017	Julie's Greenroom	Hugo the Duck	Performer
2017	Nella the Princess Knight	Knight Brigade	Voice
2017–2018	The Tick	Stosh	
2017–2019	Yu-Gi-Oh! VRAINS	Kiyoshi Kogami, Dr. Genome	English dub; credited as H.D. Quinn
2018–2021	44 Cats	Cats in Black, LaPalette, Ambrogio	English dub; credited as H.D. Quinn
2018–2024	Taffy	Bentley	English dub
2019	Nature Cat	Twig Stickman, Johnny Spins	Voice; 2 episodes
2019–2024	Boy Girl Dog Cat Mouse Cheese	Stevie Smith, Dad, Uncle Bub, Ripped Abman, Janitor, Robots	Voice; credited as H.D. Quinn
2021	Law and Order: Organized Crime	Store Owner	Episode: "An Inferior Product"
2026	The Muppet Show	Supporting Muppet Performer	ABC/Disney+ special

=== Video games ===
Year(s)	Title	Role	Notes
1999	Bear in the Big Blue House: Bear's Sense of Adventure	Pop, Treelo	Voice
1999	Bear in the Big Blue House: Bear's Imagine That!	Pop, Treelo	Voice
2004	Red Dead Revolver	Cornet Brother #2, Cowboy #3, Guard	Voice
2004	Grand Theft Auto: San Andreas	Pedestrian	Voice
2010	Red Dead Redemption	Local Population	Voice
2013	Thor: The Dark World	Ymir, Marauder Captain	Voice
2013	Dungeon Hunter 4	Male Peasant, Demon Wolf, Additional voices	Credited as H.D. Quinn
2013	Grand Theft Auto V	Local Population	Voice
2014	Brothers in Arms 3: Sons of War	Dean Miller	Credited as H.D. Quinn
2015	Dragon Mania Legends	Dragon voices	Voice
2018	Super Smash Bros. Ultimate	Incineroar	Credited as H.D. Quinn
2018	Pathfinder: Kingmaker	Ekundayo	Credited as H.D. Quinn

Preceded by Brian Henson	Performer of Janice; 2005–2008	Succeeded by David Rudman
Preceded by Jerry Nelson	Performer of Herry Monster; 2013	Succeeded by Peter Linz
