= Secret Magic Control Agency =

- Russian theatrical release poster
- Directed by: Aleksey Tsitsilin
- Written by: Analisa LaBianco; Vladimir Nikolaev; Jeffery Spencer; Aleksey Tsitsilin; Aleksey Zamyslov
- Based on: Hansel and Gretel by Brothers Grimm
- Produced by: Sergey Selyanov (ru); Vladimir Nikolaev (ru); Sasha Shapiro
- Starring: Nicholas Corda; Sylvana Joyce; Alyson Rosenfeld; Courtney Shaw; Erica Schroeder; Marc Thompson
- Edited by: Aleksey Tsitsilin
- Music by: Gabriel Hays; Brad Breeck
- Production companies: Wizart Animation; CTB Film Company; QED International
- Distributed by: Sony Pictures Releasing (Russia); Netflix (International)
- Release dates: March 18, 2021 (Russia); March 25, 2021 (United States)
- Running time: 104 minutes
- Country: Russia
- Language: English
- Budget: $7 million
- Box office: $1.2 million; 80.8 million RUB

Secret Magic Control Agency (also known as Hansel & Gretel) is a 2021 English-language Russian animated spy comedy film directed by Aleksey Tsitsilin and written by Analisa LaBianco, Vladimir Nikolaev, Jeffery Spencer, Tsitsilin, and Aleksey Zamyslov. Produced by Wizart Animation, CTB Film Company, and QED International, the film is a loose adaptation of the fairy tale Hansel and Gretel by the Brothers Grimm.

Secret Magic Control Agency was released on 18 March 2021 in Russia by Sony Pictures Productions and Releasing. Netflix acquired global rights to the film and released it on 25 March 2021. The film performed well at the streaming rankings for Netflix reaching the top ten global viewership charts in the first week of its release. The film received generally positive reviews from critics, noting the animation in particular.

== Plot ==
In a fantasy kingdom, all magic is regulated by the Secret Magic Control Agency (S.M.C.A.). One day, the king is abducted by sentient food enchanted with black magic. To keep the rest of the kingdom calm, the prime minister agrees to keep the abduction confidential and have the S.M.C.A. investigate. The S.M.C.A. appoints agent Gretel with her disowned brother and con artist Hansel, who the agency believes could contribute with his knowledge and abilities to track down the king.

The siblings identify a local pastry shop with a pantry that has sentient baked goods. Gretel discovers a potion room in the pantry, which includes a beaker of enchanted vanilla extract. Hansel and Gretel are turned into children after a chase with a dog-shaped cookie destroys the building. Unable to get help from the S.M.C.A. as no one believes that the children are Hansel and Gretel, they seek the assistance of Baba Yaga, a witch rumored to eat children. They learn that the enchanted vanilla extract came from the swamplands.

After escaping from Baba Yaga's, the siblings make their way to the swamplands, where mermaids live. However, the Lake Witch mistakes them for spies for Ilvira, the witch of the gingerbread house and former chef of the king. They are spared from being turned into fish when her daughter recognizes Gretel as the one who saved her from a previous incident. Hansel and Gretel discover that the mermaids have imprisoned some of Ilvira's goons. Gretel frees the goons who lead them to Ilvira's lair and the king's whereabouts. The spies learn Ilvira's intent was to make the sovereign and the whole kingdom fall in love with magic to become queen and gain the magical power imbued in the noble title itself. She captures the siblings and imprisons them in an oven.

Hansel and Gretel argue with each other: Gretel is disappointed in her brother's occupation as a con artist while Hansel is saddened that Gretel prioritized her career as an agent over her own family. Hansel reveals to Gretel that while their parents did advocate for their children to be honest, their jobs as agents for the S.M.C.A. were not enough to fund Gretel's education and that Hansel had given up his chance at an honest life to pay for Gretel's tuition, which he told Gretel was a scholarship from the king. They both reconcile and escape the oven.

The siblings prepare an antidote and go to the wedding. Gretel gives the antidote to the king, but the marriage is sealed before they can stop Ilvira. Before Gretel can pour the antidote into Ilvira's cookie-making machine, Ilvira takes the antidote back and shoves the children into the batter to be baked into cookies. Using an S.M.C.A. gadget Hansel stole from the agency earlier, Hansel and Gretel escape, get the antidote back, and drop Ilvira into the cookie batter.

Having saved the king and the kingdom from Ilvira, Gretel is awarded the title of "Best Agent" by the S.M.C.A. and Hansel is given an official license to perform magic, which he declines since he is incapable of using real magic. Gretel decides to work with her brother on all her future assignments.

== Voice cast ==
- Sylvana Joyce as Gretel, Hansel's sister and a Secret Magic Control Agency agent
  - Courtney Shaw as child Gretel
- Nicholas Corda as Hansel, Gretel's brother and a famous fraudster who pretends to be a wizard
  - Alyson Leigh Rosenfeld as child Hansel
- Erica Schroeder as Ilvira, the witch of the Gingerbread House and former cook of the King
- Marc Thompson as the King
- Thompson also voices a circus worker
- Georgette Reilly as Agent Stepmother, the head of the Secret Magic Control Agency
- Johanna Elmina Moise as Agent Stepdaughter, an inventor at the Secret Magic Control Agency
- Mike Pollock as the Prime Minister
- Mary O'Brady as Baba Yaga

== Concept ==
=== Animated film ===
The film's Hansel and Gretel are more active participants than the original material. The creators of the film stated the production had three components: an entertaining story for all audiences, high-quality animation and well-produced visual effects and background. They noted the Hansel and Gretel fairy tale has parental qualities associated with the story that revolves around the siblings Hansel and Gretel. The film's main audience will be the family.

The creators of the film acknowledged the original story has elements of horror. They retold the archetypal horror tale in a way that it can be appealing to all the audience by adding elements of comedy. Director Aleksey Tsitsilin remarked the film was not a remake: "We wanted not to remake, but to rethink. Leave the logic of the narrative and string some additional details. The story begins to play with new colors, it becomes different, but at the same time you realize that it is all the same Hansel and Gretel."

== Production ==
=== Development ===
In 2018, Wizart Animation revealed plans for a Hansel and Gretel film. Compared to their previous films, Wizart Animation focused on story integrity and humor. On 6 November 2019 at the American Film Market, the studio revealed the exclusive poster and preliminary collection of artwork for Secret Magic Control Agency. Wizart Animation has experience in adapting 19th-century fairy tales for the film industry that was featured in their The Snow Queen films.

At the 2019 MIPCOM in Cannes, Wizart Animation showcased a preview of Secret Magic Control Agency. On 13 October 2019, a presentation of domestic animation projects was held at MIPJunior. New material for the film was presented by Evgenia Markova, an official representative of the international markets MIPCOM, MIPJunior, and MIPTV.

Wizart Animation founded a production pact with QED International, and both companies agreed to creatively bolster the prospects for an international distribution collaboration. Yuri Moskvin, producer for Wizart, was in attendance as the managers from both sides signed a production contract. Sasha Shapiro of QED stated: “We have been looking into both investment possibilities and creative expansion within the family/kids’ genre, and I believe that Wizart has all necessary potentials we have been looking for.” The collaboration is one of the first times Wizart Animation entered the American film market.

Netflix acquired global rights to the film in 2019, when the film was presented for the first time to the professional community at the Marché du Film in Cannes. Together with Expocontent, a presentation of the project was organized under the Made in Russia brand. The presentation featured a catalog of the film's international voice acting produced in part through subsidies provided by the Ministry of Economic Development and the REC. Netflix buyers liked the film, and negotiations with the platform continued at subsequent film markets organized by Roskino and culminated in a global deal and agreement on a one-time release of the film in March 2021.

The film was presented at the September 2019 Toronto International Film Festival, the 2020 EFM film market in Berlin, and the 2020 Miami Kidscreen Summit.

=== Writing ===
While the original fairy tale is historically known for different horror film adaptations, the film's writers made the adaptation family-friendly and comedic. The adaptation was created in a way to be in the template used by Brothers Grimm from their fairy tales that had both horror and comedy.

The script had been in development for years. The screenwriters said adapting the classic European fairy tale was complicated, since it had only two settings: a gingerbread house and a dense forest. More than 57 script variants were written; one scenario involved a father and his children living in a forest. The writers explored the concept of the super-agent school where the troublemakers Hansel and Gretel enroll in. By the final script, the idea of a spy film with super-agents was finalized. One of the ways the writers formulated ideas was to go on real missions so they could be "in the shoes" of the characters.

The screenwriters focused on character development. In the final version of the script, the main characters turn into children, which allowed the writers to transform some of the darker undertones in the fairy tale into a suitable scenario. The film emphasized the detective component, revolving the story around the story's main setting, the Secret Magic Control Agency. The scriptwriters reviewed films from the James Bond series, Kingsman, as well as The Diamond Arm.

The writers intended to keep Hansel, Gretel, and the gingerbread house witch intact while expanding the settings. They noted the scale at which they developed the fairy tale universe is intended to keep the knowledgeable viewers of the fairy tale engaged. The idea of creating a magical security agency opened up new directions for film production. The script turned into a global story with references to elements from other cultures including Baba Yaga, the Frog Princess, mermaids on branches, seven-league boots, mermaids, and magical artifacts taken from different stories. The gingerbread mythological character Kolobok became a major character in the film. The interior design of Secret Magic Control Agency was inspired by the architecture of Hogwarts.

=== Animation ===
More than 60,000 frames were drawn in sync with the music, and the episodes were changed more than thirty times. About fifteen departments worked on the film and each frame moved according to the principle of a conveyor belt system. Animation for the film was considerably influenced by works from leading artists. The gingerbread house was based on the works of Antoni Gaudí. The animators were influenced by Tim Burton's ability to transform horror elements to charming characters featured in films like Corpse Bride. The studio's computer farm specification for the film is said to be 3,000 processor cores. The film is said to be Russia's first three-dimensional animated film made with the studio's own 3D lighting editor. The studio increased the character density during the climax at the royal square to about 1,200 characters.

Compared to previous Wizart Animation films, Secret Magic Control Agency used new animation methodologies and prototypes. The film is based on a new animation special effects system, the animation studio itself engineered. The system is based on the studio's own pipeline.

== Themes ==
Fantasy elements became cosmopolitan as Alexander Pushkin's fairy tales combined with western European fantasy. The writers explored Ilvira's cooking concept of love and sweets with cookies, cupcakes and candy. The concept of a megalomaniac whose cooking of cookies and cupcakes poses a threat to the government was once explained in Vladimir Lenin's thesis in 1917; during the Soviet Union, political scientists hypothesized what would happen in a scenario where the chef takes control of the government, "Every cook must learn to manage the state." Through comedy and drama, the authors explained the archaic thesis in a script of bureaucracy and its associated culinary politics. Ilvira became the cook of the thesis who was developed and refined to become a caricature of Marilyn Monroe.

Themes addressed in the film include family relationships and sibling bonds. The siblings' side story reveals that they are torn apart when Gretel becomes a respected student at the Secret Magic Control Agency studying on a government scholarship, while Hansel makes ends meet with deception. The film is framed as a mission, revealing the strengths and weaknesses of both Hansel and Gretel.

One of the main themes in the original fairy tale is sibling loyalty. The Brothers Grimm described how the siblings affected by poverty and parental loss grew up to trust and be loyal with each other. The film explores the concept of kinship. The concept is described when Hansel and Gretel must find common ground to rescue the king by affirming their sibling loyalty.

== Soundtrack ==
The score for Secret Magic Control Agency is composed by Gabriel Hays. He said that writing music for the genres of spy and fantasy required more reflection because the music would contrast with each other. Additionally this area of music is generally unexplored. Using the "fun, whimsy, and heart" classical characters Hansel and Gretel as a template, the music melded fantasy with the spy genre. Hays noted the creative component of the score started with initial excerpts from piano recordings. Thereafter three main songs for the film were created, such as the "Secret Magic Control Agency" that became the ideal representation of the concept of the fusion of spy and fantasy elements; the other main cues are "Back at the SMCA" and "Here's Looking at You Not Kid". Hays remarked that the art of composition involves musical vocabulary benchmarks and mindfully orchestrating tunes using acquired muscle memory of playing instruments.

== Release ==
Secret Magic Control Agency was released in Russia through Sony Pictures Productions and Releasing on 18 March 2021. The Netflix team promoted and localized the film for international distribution. On 25 March 2021, the film released under the Netflix Original brand.

== Reception ==
=== Streaming viewership ===
According to streaming aggregator FlixPatrol, the film topped the global viewership charts on Netflix in its first week. On 27 March 2021, a few days after the film began streaming on Netflix, the film became the second most popular film on the platform as it overcame and bypassed the ratings of Hollywood and worldwide blockbusters that included Fast and Furious. In the United States, it became the third most popular film seen in the movies section and top sixth overall. In the United Kingdom, the film reached the sixth position in rankings. In Germany, the film reached third position and tenth overall. Overall on that day it was the top film in Greece, Denmark, Finland, Cyprus, Sweden, Norway, Luxembourg and Jamaica.

On 28 March 2021, Secret Magic Control Agency was second in rankings worldwide. In the US where it was released it moved up to second most popular film in the movies section and top fourth overall. The film maintained its previous lead in the Scandinavian nations and Greece while the film moved up to the top position in France. In Germany, the film continued to be at the second position, and it attained top position in Poland and Brazil.

According to an IndieWire report, by 29 March 2021 the film ranked second on Netflix. In the US the streaming rankings were the same as the previous day.

Secret Magic Control Agency broke its own record from March in Netflix during April. Secret Magic Control Agency managed to become the top rated film in the Netflix platform for two days subsequently after which it went to second in rankings after Sky High was released.

The film has received significant coverage in Mexico and France. In its first week of release, it was one of the top-watched films in Mexico. The film was part of the top ten listings in the Netflix Spanish catalogue. According to FlixPatrol, the film was the most watched on Netflix for five days in a row in France in its first week. EcranLarge report from France noted "Hansel and Gretel, Secret Agents is shaping up to be another successful cartoon on Netflix, available since March 25." In Philippines and Greece, the film was part of the compilation of recommended shows to watch in Netflix. In the second week of April, the film continued to be in the top ten rankings in Netflix in certain countries. According to Nielsen ratings, Secret Magic Control Agency is the sixth highest video on demand program watched in United States. For the week of March 29–April 4, Nielsen calculated the film to rise to the second highest most watched film in the country. It became the tenth most popular film in April on Netflix.

=== Box office ===
The budget for the film is approximately $5–7 million. Secret Magic Control Agency opened in the Russian box office in fifth place in its debut on Thursday 18 March 2021. It earned about two million rubles in the opening and had a predicted earning of 30 million rubles in its first weekend. The highest ranking the film held was at fifth place on 18 March 2021. After the weekend, Secret Magic Control Agency was behind Warner -' Tom & Jerry ($8 million) while leading its parallel release animated feature Ainbo: Spirit of the Amazon. Due to the high box office revenue of Raya and the Last Dragon ($15 million) that released in early March, Secret Magic Control Agency was sixth in rankings, and the film descended to seventh place by April. The film's final collection was 80.8 million ₽ (~$1 million). According to analysts, the high competition such as those from Disney was one reason for the low start. However the film managed to become the fifth highest grossing Russian release in March 2021. In Kazakhstan, the film became the second highest rated film after Raya and the Last Dragon in March 2021.

=== Critical response ===
Russian-speaking critics note the film is aimed at children, but also entertained adults. Boris Grishin stated for a review in Kino Mail, the film is also suitable for adults: "A fascinating, dynamic, witty cartoon, a real adventure detective, whose intrigue will be interesting even for adults to follow. So for family viewing - a really good option." Ksenia Reutova for Kinoafisha wrote notes in terms of the pace and action of the script: “From all these scraps, the authors of the animated film manage to weave a canvas that looks quite soundly. The threads do not stick out, the action does not sag.”

Common Sense Media said the film is ideal for siblings who may want to "learn about each other and themselves in the process of working together to save the kingdom". The film also focuses on character development when "the siblings argue then come to some realizations and a new understanding of each other and their shared history, offers a bit of depth and a nice contrast to the nonstop action." Lights! Camera! Mom! states: "A royal kidnapping is nothing new, but taking familiar characters like Hansel and Gretel and writing a completely new background story creates a great family film."

Critics affirmed the score for the film is a spectacle. ABC Entertainment noted the music has "grandiose symphonic sweeps that we’ve come to expect from other feel-good family films." UnificationFrance said, "The music of Brad Joseph Breeck and Gabriel Hays is fun to listen to." Common Sense Media stated "the action is often set to inspirational music."

For animation, Cam's Eye View stated: "Animation-wise, it looks solid! It's still not up to par with most animated features from this or the previous decade, but you can tell from their first film to their most recent that Wizart is getting better at their craft." The Upcoming noted that the animation quality peaked in the final sets: "the art and animation is beautiful and is Pixar-like in its finish." A Netflix review at Blockbuster01.com by Shimato stated the Japanese dub for Gretel by Rie Kugimiya is commendable: "This work is worth seeing by itself," and that "two people who have been estranged for a long time" who must "cooperate [and] inevitably, the lost bond between the brothers and sisters returns" was exemplary character development.

Robledo Milani for Papo de Cinema wrote that the Secret Magic Control Agency is "more like a police force whose aim is not to regulate, but to curb magical practices." The reviewer's impression from the film is that in context to the other Hansel and Gretel adaptations such as "João and Maria: Witch Hunters (2013) or Maria and João: The Tale Of Witches (2020), which invested in adrenaline or terror", Secret Magic Control Agency "starts from a more original principle, although less ambitious." Corriere della Sera newspaper review observes the heroes Hansel and Gretel begins the story in precarious situations, "they have lost their roots as vanished prisoners of the dark forces of the forest." However, as the film progresses the film resonates with the audience: "Theirs is a digital journey, full of quotes ranging from classic cartoon to the most recent post-modern reinterpretations. The heart of the film however only beats when it accelerates to the spy story plane: that's where in the end the virtues and vices of lively, simpleton pop cinema come to light."

Isabelle Arnaud from Unification said "Aleksey Tsitsilin's direction is superb" through which the film's staging "does not give the impression that 1h45 has passed." With a four and a half stars out of five stars Arnaud noted the screenplay "present[ed] in an original way the characters from the books of the brothers Grimm." Toon Canoe stated the film is a "rollicking spy adventure that gives enough winks and nods to the original to keep the inspiration from feeling like an afterthought." The review particularly like the "fun denouement with the Brothers Grimm themselves" that was intended to remind the audience the original creators of the fairy tale but also was framed to "hang on a small lampshade on the overall secrecy of the [Secret Magic Control Agency]."

== Sequel ==
A sequel, titled Secret Magic Control Agency II: Mission Sleeping Beauty, was announced to be in production on May 12, 2023. The film will be produced by Magic Frame Animation and Creation Entertainment Media; with Tsitsilin returning as director, and Joyce and Corda reprising their roles.

== See also ==
- List of films about witchcraft
