= The Kitten from Lizyukov Street 2 =

- Theatrical release poster
- Directed by: Alexey Zamyslov
- Written by: Vitaly Zlotnikov; Vladimir Nikolaev; Aleksey Tsitsilin; Alexey Zamyslov; Lyudmila Zlotnikova
- Produced by: Yuri Moskvin; Vladimir Nikolaev
- Starring: Dimitri Kurta; Olga Shkorohova
- Cinematography: Aleksey Tsitsilin
- Edited by: Aleksey Tsitsilin
- Music by: Maxim Maksimov; Fabrizio Mancinelli
- Animation by: Aleksey Lyamkin; Alexey Zamyslov; Mariia Budlianska; Andrey Korenkov
- Production companies: Soyuzmultfilm; Wizart Animation
- Distributed by: Sony Pictures Releasing
- Release date: August 31, 2017
- Running time: 13 minutes
- Country: Russia
- Language: Russian

The Kitten from Lizyukov Street 2 (Russian: Котенок с улицы Лизюкова 2, romanized: Kotyonok s Ulitsy Lizyukova 2) is a 2017 Russian computer-animated short film produced by Wizart Animation and directed by Alexey Zamyslov.

The adaptation is the sequel to Kitten from Lizyukov Street that also features the previous film's themes of nostalgia to the native homeland. The dialogues and script is written by the author of the first part of the cartoon Vyacheslav Kotyonochkin. The short film was made with feature-film quality standards and is a continuation of the Soviet Union classic film into the Russian era.

== Plot ==
In Voronezh, Vasiliy the kitten and Bulka the puppy are rying to attract the attention of passers-by. Suddenly he notices Vasily and rushes in pursuit of him. Fortunately, Vasiliy climbs into a dog sculpture, where he sits until the evening. When the frost intensified, Bulka and Vaska became friends. Vasily expresses a desire to “live somewhere where it's summer all year round.” They are overheard by the Crow, who decides to help Vasily and Bulka and fulfill their wish. Remembering her grandmother's magic word, the crow takes Vasiliy and Bulka to a beach in Australia. Where they ended up at the finals of the volleyball league in which the players were kangaroos and ostriches, while the coach is a wombat.

Suddenly, the ball jumps off the tree and falls into the mouth of a sleeping crocodile. Then Bulka and Vaska try together to save the ball, but the Crocodile wakes up and, being angry, intends to eat them. While the kangaroo and Bulka are running to look for the ball, Vasily, seeing the wombat wakesurfing, asks the kangaroo for permission to take paint from him. He agrees, and Vasiliy starts to practice his surfing skills, but is overtaken by a great white shark.

Vasily then ends up stuck in a tree with a koala, as he watches from above Bulka running to the Outback from the volleyball players and accidentally stepping on a gopher. Vasily begins to drink milk, but inadvertently knocks over one of the koalas, and it almost falls into the mouth of the crocodile. Vasily manages to hold her, but soon the crocodile grabs a branch with its mouth, and the kitten and koala are ejected. Soon Bulka finds himself near the tree with Vasily and the koalas, pinched by the approaching Australians. On time, Vasily jumps from the tree and says that this is not accepted in Voronezh, after which he talks about the streets in his hometown. Suddenly, the crow then takes them back to Voronezh.

== Voice cast ==
- Dmitriy Kurta as Vasiliy
- Olga Shorokhova as Bulka
- Irina Ponomaryova as Crow
- Lina Ivanova as Kangaroo
- Alexander Noskov as Crocodile
- Yekaterina Semyonova as Mama Kangaroo

== Production ==
In 2017 there were plans for the continuation of the Soviet Union animation classic Kitten from Lizyukov Street. Wizart Animation was proposed as the animation studio for production. Governor Alexey Gordeev in 2017 at a meeting assured Wizart Animation, who received support of the Voronezh Region in carrying out the task of adapting the Soviet Union sequel. The short film was intended to find a positive response among the widest audience.

First the necessary legality framework had to be considered before the proposal was passed. Soyuzmultfilm the animation studio that bought the original film to the screens agreed for joint production with Wizart Animation. Nikolay Makovsky, producer of the Soyuzmultfilm film studio stated, "We are sure that we will get a good animated film aimed for children. It has a piece of Soyuzmultfilm in it."

The original right holders to the film; Alexey Kotenochkin and Lyudmila Zlotnikova also agreed to start the production. Originally an unpublished sequel story by acclaimed writer Vitaly Markovich Zlotnikov who wrote for the first film never went into production. There was no time for the production and the idea was put in the shelves. The writers of the 2017 sequel originally were unaware of the posthumous work. However they were enthusiastic in adapting the unpublished sequel script given to them by Zlotnikova. Lyudmila Zlotnikova noted "according to his works, 14 cartoons were staged: 13 during his lifetime, the 14th-already without him. And now it will be the 15th cartoon based on the works of Vitaly Markovich." Lyudmila Zlotnikova also took part in the creation of the film. The script also contained the dialogues of the characters.

Alexey Kotenochkin, the son of Vyacheslav Kotyonochkin who worked with the director of the original film as production designer also approved of the idea: "The main thing is that there are all the components of a good film – high-quality animation, high-quality music and an interesting story. And it is especially nice that the sequel will be filmed in Voronezh."

The film was intended as a twelve-minute 3D animated short film scheduled for release in 2017. Production started as early as 2014 with copyright negotiation taking over two years. The film would be a sequel and not a remake. During the time period director Timur Bekmambetov visited Voronezh and proposed the idea of being part of the production team for the sequel short film. The project became Wizart Animation's first short film. The film will have the acclaimed song by Vladimir Migulya intact while in terms of animation the studio tried to preserve the style of the first film as much as possible.

According to producer Yuri Moskvin, the project tried to animate the Soviet Union kitten Vasily and his story into a Russian era story - "The film is undoubtedly an important project for us, which we treated with the utmost trepidation. The classic Soviet animation in a new interpretation has acquired the 3D format, the kitten has become more modern, in the spirit of the times." Voronezh animators thought of at first going to traditional animation. However they were used to draw everything in detail changing the animation format. Furthermore, the studio staff worked overtime for the film conceptualizing the project as if it was a full-length film. The studio acknowledged the production is their tribute to their hometown.

The sequel script focused on themes of nostalgia for the native country as well as the attractions component of the film conceptualized by the character Kitten Vaska who starts a travel agency. The main setting will be Australia. The film was presented at the 2017 MIPCOM.

The pre-premiere of the short film coincided on 31 August 2017, before Day of Knowledge at Voronezh. The governor of Voronezh was at the pre-premiere who explained, "Vasily is the same kitten who lived in the twentieth century in a country called the Soviet Union. Now he lives in the twenty-first century in a country called Russia." The animation project is intended to raise the level of tourism in Voronezh, as the film depicts recognizable places of the city such as Admiralty Square, Goto Predestination and the monument to the White Bim Black Ear.

The short film was part of the CARTOON in the cinema program on 26 May 2018 as well as the July 2018 Multimir festival of animation and entertainment. For the first time in September 2019, an art object from Wizart Animation decorated Voronezh as the Square Nikitinskiy Park featured graffiti paintings of the characters from The Kitten from Lizyukov Street 2.

== Accolades ==
Award	Date of ceremony	Category	Recipient(s) and nominee(s)	Result
SCHLINGEL International Film Festival	1 October 2018	Short Films	The Kitten from Lizyukov Street 2	Nominated
Near Nazareth Festival	2018	Best Animation	The Kitten from Lizyukov Street 2	Won
Kolkata Shorts International Film Festival	2018	Best Animation	The Kitten from Lizyukov Street 2	Won
Jaipur International Short Film Festival	2018	Best Animation Short	The Kitten from Lizyukov Street 2	Won
Golden Eagle	27 January 2019	Best Non-fiction Film	The Kitten from Lizyukov Street 2	Nominated
IAFF Golden Kuker (Bulgaria)	7 December 2019	Short Film made for Kids	Alexey Zamyslov	Nominated
