= The Kitten from Lizyukov Street =

- Theatrical release poster
- Directed by: Vyacheslav Kotyonochkin
- Written by: Vitaly Zlotnikov
- Produced by: Lilian Monahova
- Starring: voice cast only
- Cinematography: Alexander Chekhovsky
- Edited by: Elena Nikitkina
- Music by: Vladimir Migulya
- Animation by: Alexey Kotenochkin; Victoria Makina; Sergey Marakasov; Tatiana Makarova
- Production company: Soyuzmultfilm
- Release date: 1988
- Running time: 9 minutes
- Country: Soviet Union
- Language: Russian

The Kitten from Lizyukov Street (Russian: Котёнок с улицы Лизюкова, romanized: Kotyonok s Ulitsy Lizyukova) is a 1988 Soviet animated film directed by Vyacheslav Kotyonochkin of Soyuzmultfilm animation studio.

The film features the voices of popular artists Vyacheslav Nevinny and Olga Aroseva. The fairy tale story drawn in traditional animation describes the life of kitten Vasily who finds it difficult living in the African wilderness as a hippopotamus. Kitten Vasiliy is nostalgic for the days of his homeland, Lizyukov Street in Voronezh, Russia. In 2003 a sculpture was opened in Voronezh, featuring the characters Vasily and the crow.

== Plot ==
A British Shorthair named Vasiliy who always wanted to be bold against the yard dogs. One day his wish is granted as a crow lets him be turned into a pink hippopotamus and finding himself in the African Savanna. Where he meets a blue elephant and a lion, saves an ostrich from a hungry crocodile and befriends a marmoset who lives in the coconut trees. Eventually Vasiliy is feeling nostalgic for his love to its home at the Lizyukov street and tells the crow to return to his original form. The crow accepts and Vasily is transported back to the Lizyukov street. The renewed kitten now can be bold against the yard dogs again because he has not lost his roar of the hippopotamus.

== Voice cast ==
- Vyacheslav Nevinny as Vasiliy
- Olga Aroseva as Elephant
- Vladimir Soshalsky as Lion
- Margarita Korabelnikova as Crow

== Production ==
Filmed in 1988 by Soyuzmultfilm using hand-drawn animation, the cartoon gave the start to Voronezh animation history. Vitaly Zlotnikov, the screenwriter settled the hero on a real historical street of a residential neighborhood of Voronezh, named after General Alexander Lizyukov. As a native of Voronezh, Zlotnikov based the setting on the address of his wife's relatives. Vyacheslav Kotyonochkin, one of the directors of the acclaimed Soviet Union animated series Well, Just You Wait! directed the film. Framed as a fairy tale, the story depicts Voronezh kitten Vasily, who dreams of turning into anything other than a kitten, so as to escape the terrifying yard dogs.

The Kitten from Lizyukov Street is Voronezh resident's favorite cartoon whose characters are part of their cultural fabric and heritage. The cartoon and the eponymous character, kitten Vasily is not only known in Voronezh but also in many parts of Russia. Most people in Russia knows about the kitten on Lizyukov Street. In 2016 a vote was held in the Russian Federation on who should appear on new ruble banknotes. Among the leaders of the proposals which included the Chelyabinsk meteorite, Golden Bridge in Vladivostok, was the kitten Vasily from Liyukov Street. The proposal received over five thousand votes.

The story is comedic in nature with animation intended to emphasize the surprises such as transformations and inexplicable color and object changes that reflect the transformation phase of the character, kitten Vasily. Comedic blunders are present in the story such as the coordinates to find Voronezh was stated as 7 degrees south latitude, 30 degrees east longitude-7°00 's. 30°00.' The coordinates would have actually sent Vasily to Lake Tanganyika. The cartoon features the song "If You are a Kitten" (music by Vladimir Miguli, words by Vitaly Zlotnikov) performed by Marina Miguli.

== Reception ==
A review by Anastasia Krainer for Nash Film noted Vasily the kitten "is a hero without fear and reproach." The review also noted the impetus for the anticipation to the cartoon was high considering the last season to animated series Well, Just You Wait! finished just at the cartoon was starting to be produced. The fairy tale qualities of the film starkly contrasts from other adaptation that usually have such characters as "image of the peacemaker - cat Leopold" or "super-hero, like the giant Uncle Stepa or the crocodile Gena." Instead the fairy tale by "animated Soviet Olympus" director Kotyonochkin is depicted as "the miracle that came in the form of a crow." The crow's miracle that sends Vasily to Africa is similar to the "force that sent Alice down the rabbit hole, or Dorothy to Oz."

== Legacy ==
The cult Soviet cartoon has created aphorisms in certain communities in Russia. The song by Vasily, "there is no city anywhere better than Voronezh" is well remembered to this day.

The musical introduction to this film was used by Seryoga as the main theme for the 2003 Russian road film Bumer.

In mid-2016, Voronezh studio Wizart Animation together with Soyuzmultfilm began shooting a 3D cartoon Kitten from Lizyukov Street 2 that was released in 2017. The cartoon was set according to an unpublished script of Zlotnikov and became a continuation of the original cartoon. The fairy tale cartoon in three parts are also published into a fairy tale novel by the Moscow publishing house Altey.

=== The Kitten from Lizyukov Street Monument ===
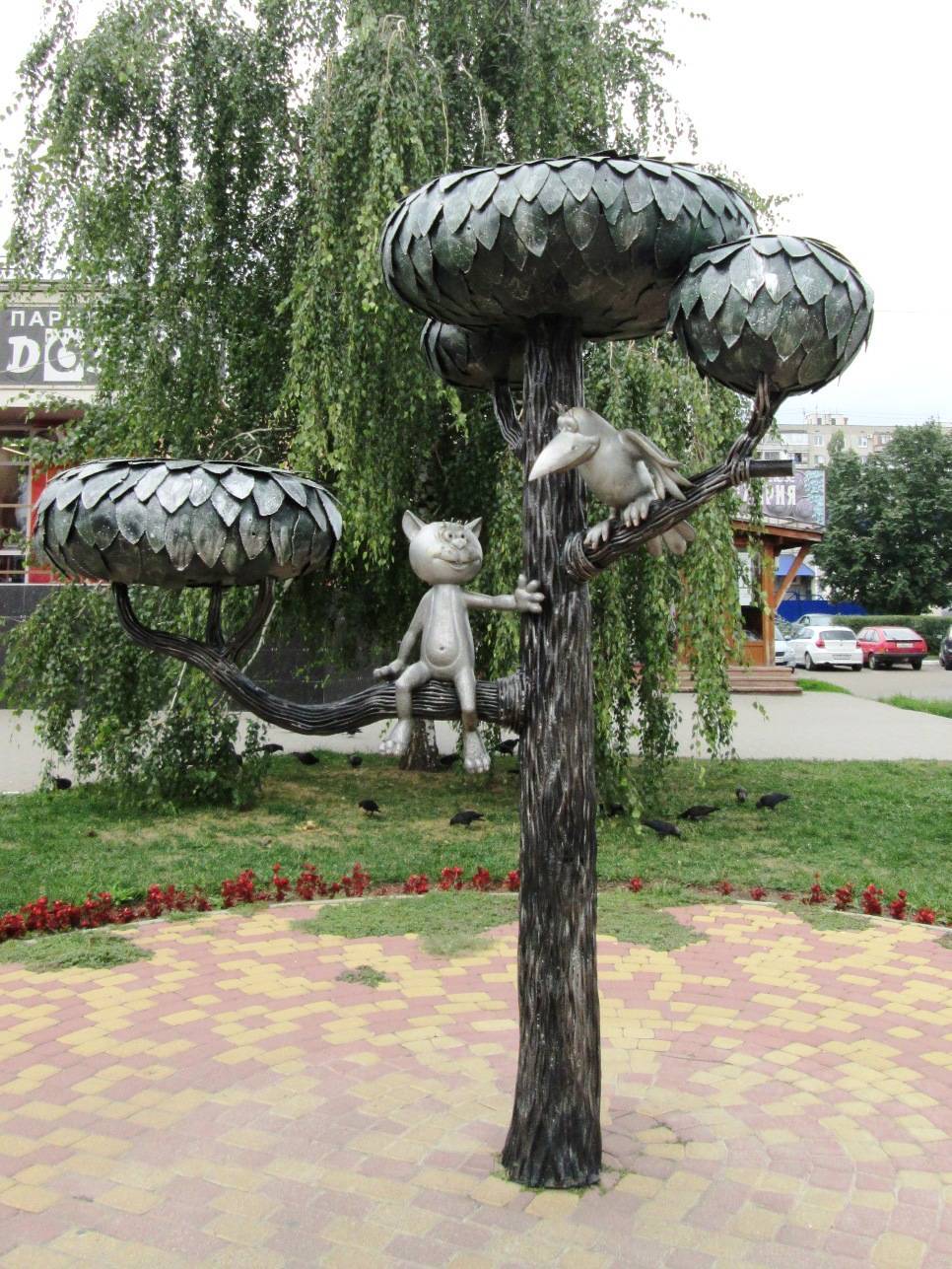
The monument showing Vasiliy (left) and Crow

Komsomolkaya Pravda initiated a proposal to install The Kitten from Lizyukov Street monument in Vororenzh. Originally, the journalism faculty at VSU were the ones who started the idea. The newspaper would get the help of the administration of the Kominternovsky district. Ivan Obraztsov, was the founder of the board of trustees of the monument. The construction of the monument began through the help of sponsors.

The newspaper recalled the editorial received plenty of drawings for the competition for the best design for the monument in 2003. On 5 December 2003, a monument dedicated to the heroes of the cartoon was installed. Vasily the kitten is the first cartoon character to have a sculpture installed in Russia. The design was by a student from Voronezh whose project was bought to construction by famous Dikunov family of sculptors in Voronezh. The monument is popular among tourists. In 2007 Voronezh residents nominated the iron kitten at Lizyukov Street for the title of honorary citizen of the city. In 2009, the kitten was almost nominated for the title of unofficial symbol of Voronezh with just one percent difference in voting from the other nominee Peter the Great. Famous people to have visited the memorial include Alexey Lysenkov and actress Maria Berseneva, Coach Konstantin Sarsania of the Torch team admitted the kitten bought his football team good luck as stated at Soviet Sport.

In 2005 the first prize for the All-Russian local history competition "Funny Monument" went to the monument. In 2013, the monument was also nominated at the contest of the visual symbol of the country "Russia 10". In 2012, thanks to the Kitten from Lizyukov Street, Voronezh appeared on the original map of Russia.

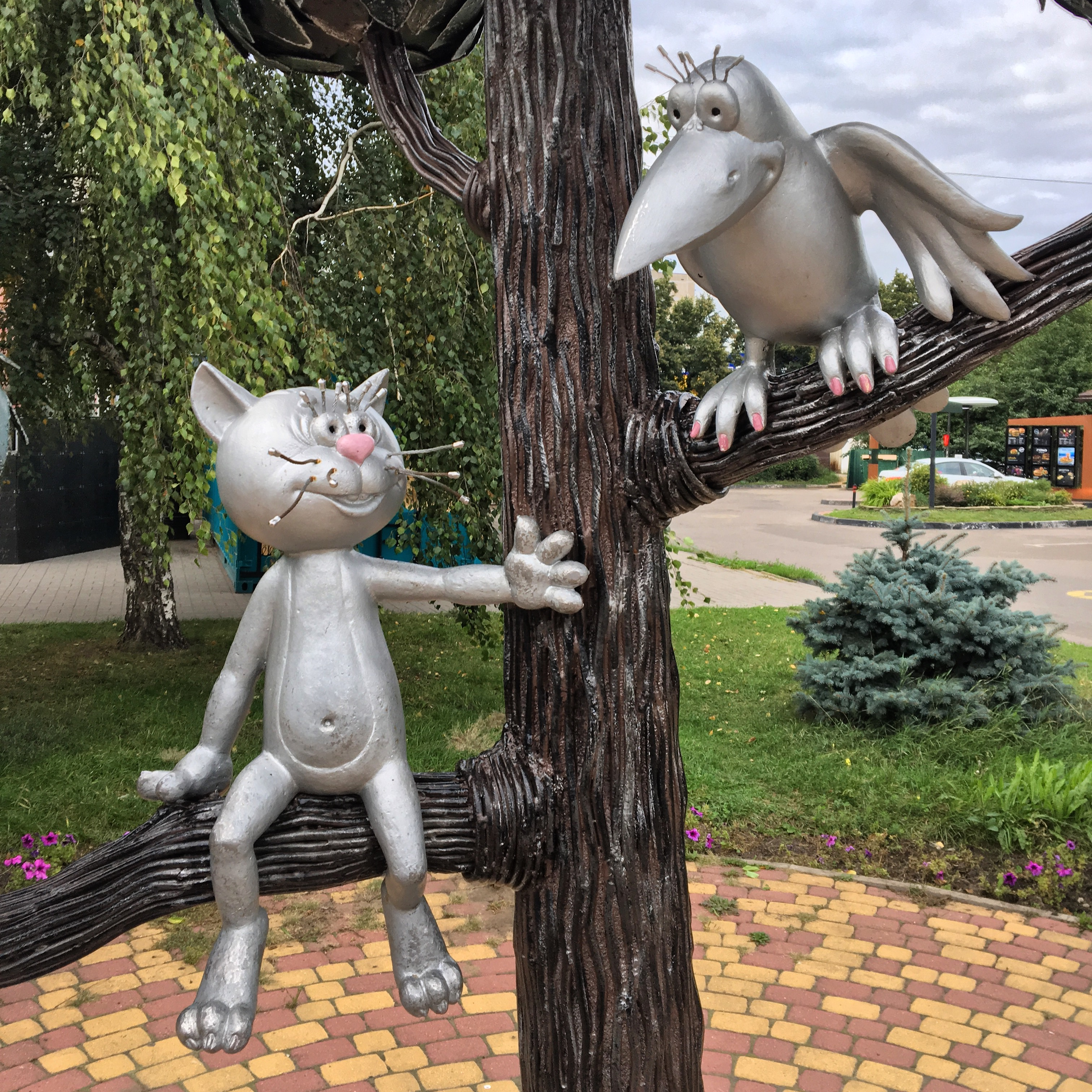
Detail showing Vasiliy's pink nose and Crow's pink talons

March 2012, the monument was taken away for repair. Ivan Chukhnov, head of the Department of Culture, said: "Many people say vandalism, vandalism. We see it differently. That they loved it so much that everyone wanted to take a piece of the kitten to himself, so that he was near. Well, maybe it's funny, but that's how we feel about it. And at the same time, we found an opportunity to carry out a complete restoration. And I hope that in this form it will serve for many, many years." With support by the Department of Culture, the city with the workshop of Dikunov constructed a new stainless steel monument. The new additions included Kitten's nose having a pink color and Crow having new talons.

On 5 December 2013, the tenth anniversary of the historical art object was celebrated as well as the 25th anniversary of the cartoon. On the festive day the monument heroes were dressed up with bow ties and flowers. Sculptor Maxim Dikunov recalled the sculptors watched the cartoon many times before the monument's construction began. A the workshop, construction began based on the design by a student at Voronezh who won the best competition for pre-visualization concept art for the project. In 2018 Winter Sberbank Games at Krasnaya Polyana, Krasnodar Krai, one of the team to compete had the Kitten from Lizyukov Street (TSCHB) mascot. Recently in 2019, near two hotels at the villages of Otradnoye and Podkletnoye at Voronezh, bronze sculptures of The Kitten from Lizyukov Street were installed. Resident adorned the original monument heroes with hand-made clothes as a gesture of goodwill. The legend of The Kitten from Lizyukov Street monument is spoken of at great lengths in Voronezh. The memorial is said to have bought good luck and fulfillment of wishes to those who stroke the iron kitten.

== See also ==
- Котёнок с улицы Лизюкова (памятник) (Russian: Котёнок с улицы Лизюкова (памятник), lit. 'The Kitten from Lizyukov Street (monument)')
- History of Russian animation
