= Witch of the North =

The Witch of the North may refer to:

- Locasta, the Good Witch of the North in the 1900 novel The Wonderful Wizard of Oz
- Glinda the Good Witch of the North, a character in the 1939 film The Wizard of Oz
- Mombi, the Wicked Witch of the North in the 1904 novel The Marvelous Land of Oz
- Addaperle, the Good Witch of the North in the 1974 musical The Wiz
- "The Witch of the North", 2021 album by Burning Witches
