= Open Russian Festival of Animated Films =

The Open Russian Festival of Animated Films (Russian: Откры́тый Росси́йский Фестива́ль Анимацио́нного Кино́), also known as "Suzdalfest" (Russian: "Суздальфест"), is an annual animation film festival held in Suzdal, Russia. It is devoted to professional appraisal of domestic Russian animation. The festival takes place in late winter or early spring (in 2007 it was on the first five days of March) and accepts only animated films from the Russian Federation and (after a 1999 referendum) from Belarus made in the last three years.

== History ==
The festival was first held in 1996 at a boarding house called "Birch Grove" near the town of Tarusa. For the first five years, the festival continued to be held in the "Birch Grove". Since 2002, the event has been held in Suzdal. The organizers call the festival the main site of Russian animation and the only professional screening of the entire animation program.

Because of the extreme scarcity of Russian animation in the post-perestroika era, submissions from the last three years were accepted. Along with auteur films, commercial reels, video clips and television bumpers were allowed. The prizes were handed out according to profession, and any member or guest of the festival was able to vote for their favourite film. The three leading winners were given wooden planks hewn by founder and president Aleksandr Tatarskiy and signed by their colleagues. For the first number of years, the festival did not have an official name and was known simply as "Tarusoy" (Тарусой).

Since 2006, the jury situation changed, and films have been judged by a panel of 33 Russian animation professionals representing varied professions in the art. 2008 was the first festival held after the death of Aleksandr Tatarskiy, who had headed all the previous festivals. The artistic director in his place was Aleksandr Gerasimov.

Playwright Vadim Zhuk had been leading led the opening and closing ceremonies of Suzdalfest for more than 20 years. He died during a visit to the Suzdalfest on March 20, 2025.

== Prizes ==
Historically, the prizes have varied in different years; on some years the jury decided to not give out a Grand Prix and other years featured specific awards tailor-made to the films which were in the competition. In 2007, the prizes were: Grand Prix (also 2nd and 3rd place), Best Direction, Best Dramaturgy, Best Visuals, Best Animation, Best Sound, Best Student Film, Best Interstitial Animation and Best Film for Children.

Additionally, before 2009, the festival allowed internet users of Rambler Vision to see the films first and vote for their favourites. The Prize of Audience Sympathies was awarded at the closing ceremony.

== See also ==
- History of Russian animation
- KROK International Animated Films Festival
- List of regional animation festivals
