= Bunta =

== People ==
- Bunta Sugawara (菅原文太; 1933–2014), a Japanese actor

== Fictional characters ==
- Bunta Daichi, from the television series J.A.K.Q. Dengekitai
- Bunta Fujiwara, from the manga series Initial D
- Bunta Kōno, from the manga series I'm No Angel
- Bunta Marui, from the manga series The Prince of Tennis
- Buntarō Hōjō, from the visual novel series Girls Beyond the Wasteland
- Gamabunta, from the manga series Naruto

== See also ==
- Roşia Montană for Bunta, a village in Romania
- The Bunta Trilogy, a Chinese 3D animated film series
