= Jake Paque =

American voice actor

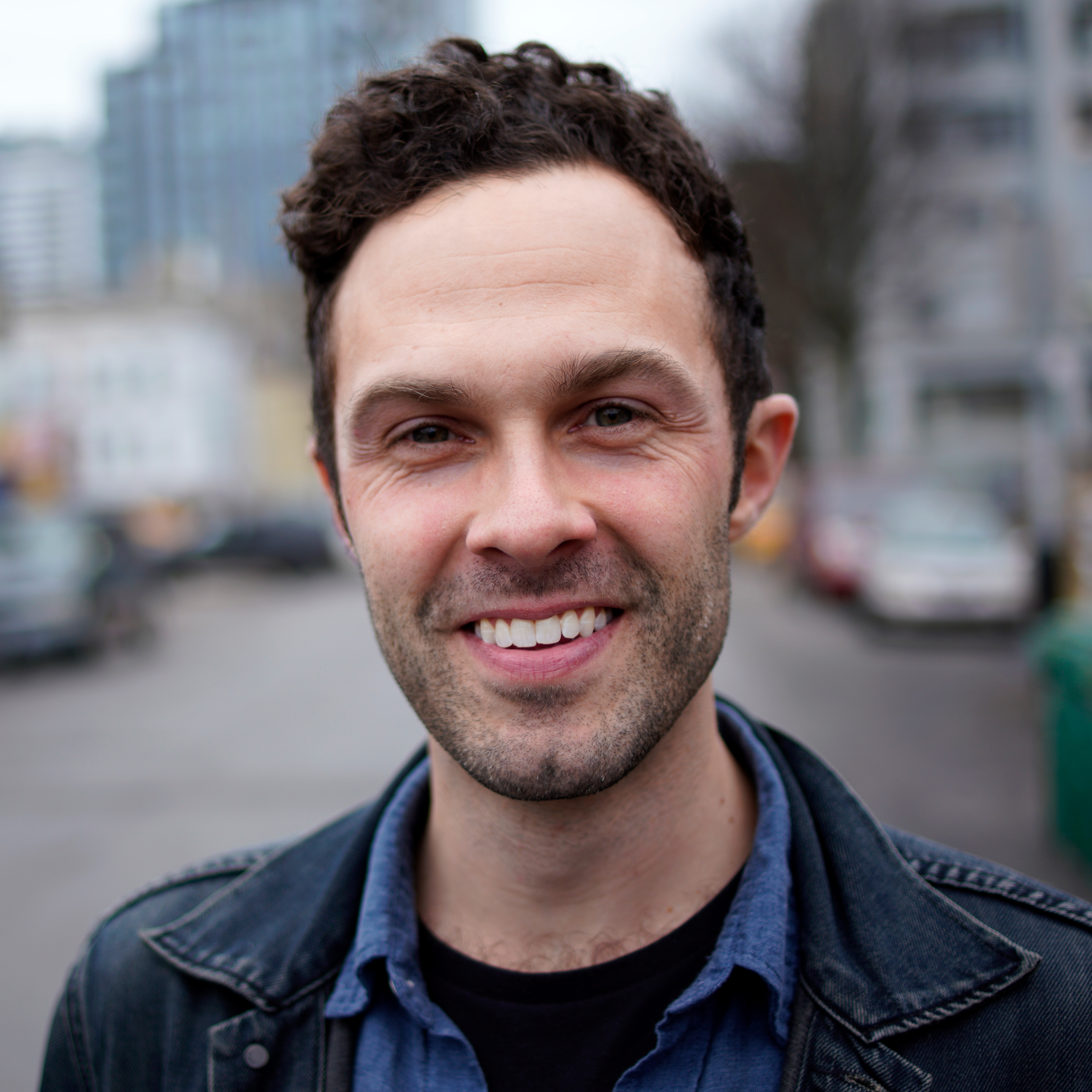
- Paque in 2020
- Occupation: Voice actor
- Years active: 2006–present
- Website: jakepaque.com

Jake Paque (/peɪk/ PAYK) is an American voice actor. He is best known for playing Caydan Phoenix in the video game Modern Combat 5.

== Filmography ==
=== Animation ===
- Super 4 – Ruby's Father/Lenny/Rock Brock/Various
- Winx Club – Brandon (DuArt Film and Video, season 7)
- Angel's Friends – Merko/Various
- Egyxos – Horus/Hatanor
- World War Blue – Boyz/Byse
- Pokémon - Professor Sycamore, Zipp, Manectric, Braviary
- Pokémon the Movie: Genesect and the Legend Awakened – Eric
- Mobile Suit Gundam Thunderbolt – Brian
- Robin Hood: Mischief in Sherwood – Little John
- The Stolen Princess – Ratmir
- The Dragon Spell – Bogdan
- Birdboy: The Forgotten Children – Birdman
- Yu-Gi-Oh! ZEXAL II - Dumon, Devon Knox
- Yu-Gi-Oh! VRAINS – Yusaku Fujiki/Playmaker
- Yu-Gi-Oh! Sevens - Kaizo

=== Video games ===
- Modern Combat 5 – Caydan Phoenix
- Brothers in Arms 3 – Mathieu Chaput
- Dungeon Hunter 5 – Various
- MXGP The Official Motocross Videogame – Announcer
- Dragon Mania Legends – Various
