= Tom Wayland =

American voice actor (born 1973)

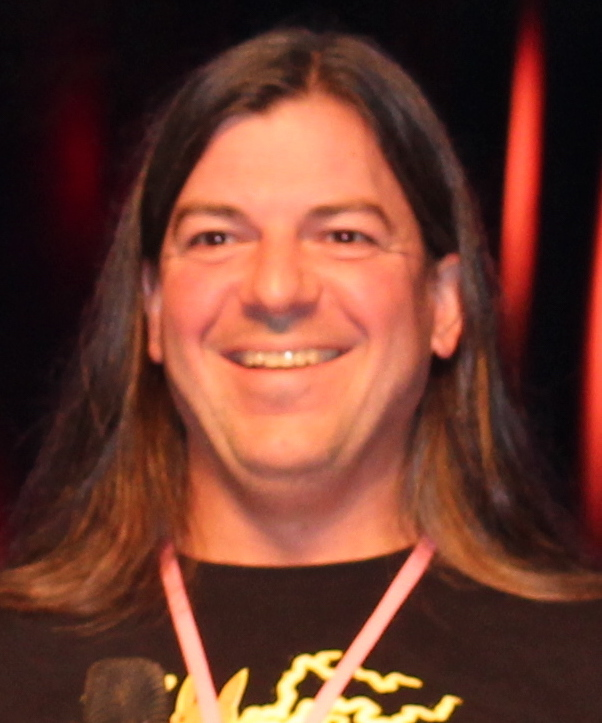
- Wayland at Animate! Miami in 2014
- Born: July 21, 1973 (age 53)
- Other name: Henry F. Benjamin
- Occupations: Voice actor; voice director; producer; supervising director
- Years active: 1994–present
- Children: 2

Tom Wayland (born July 21, 1973) is an American voice actor, voice director and producer who is the supervising director at 3Beep productions, which works on English-language dubs of Japanese anime and other global animations. He previously worked for Central Park Media and 4Kids Entertainment. He founded TripWire Productions, which has produced more than 200 different anime titles and overseen the voice direction of many animation titles. He is also a graduate of NYU's Tisch School of the Arts. He was best known as the voice director for Pokémon, Mew Mew Power, Magical DoReMi, ShootFighter Tekken, G.I. Joe: Sigma 6 and The World of Narue. He has also worked with related New York studios at DuArt Film and Video, NYAV Post, Real Recording, Matlin Recording, Beatstreet Studios and Audioworks Producers Group.

== Filmography ==
=== Animation ===
==== Animated series ====
List of dubbing performances and crew roles in animated series (including cartoons, anime, etc)
Year	Title	Role	Crew role, Notes	Ref.
2003	Alien Nine		ADR writer, ADR director	
2004	The World of Narue	Various characters	Associate Producer, ADR Voice Director, Script Adaptation	
2004–2007	One Piece	Fullbody, Choo, Kappa, Lake	4Kids Version	
2005	G.I. Joe Sigma 6	Storm Shadow	ADR Voice Director, 4Kids Version	
2006	Animation Runner Kuromi 2	Nonki Hayama		
2006	Padre Pio	Additional voices		
2006–2007	Teenage Mutant Ninja Turtles: Fast Forward	Jammerhead		
2007	Tarchin and Friends	Yalchin, Crayons and others		
2007–2008	Yu-Gi-Oh! GX	Freed, Jim Crocodile, Chumley Hoffington (episode 85)		
2008–2011	Yu-Gi-Oh! 5Ds	Blister, Nervin, Lester, Crow Hogan (seasons 4–5)		
2008–2015	Pokémon	Various: Major human characters: Reggie (DP), Flint (DP165-DP180), Mr. Sukizo (DP161-DP177), Cress (BW), Freddy O'Martian (BW), Virgil (BW), Meyer (XY009-XY066); Major Pokémon: Gible (Ash's; DP156-DP191), Charmander and Charmeleon (Ash's; BW116), Roggenrola and Boldore (Ash's; BW034-BW142), Goomy, Sliggoo and Goodra (Ash's; XY055-XY070), Drilbur and Excadrill (Iris'; BW009-BW139), Dwebble and Crustle (Cilan's), Yamask (James'; BW023-BW142), Magmar and Magmortar (Paul's), Gastrodon (Zoey's), Pansear (Chili's), Beartic (Georgia's), Honedge, Doublade, and Aegislash (Argus Steel's), Arceus (M12)	ADR director	
2010	Ikki Tousen: Dragon Destiny	Kakouton		
2011	Shaktimaan Animated	Bumpy, Guru #6, others	English dub	
2011–2012	Tai Chi Chasers	Finn		
2012–2013	Yu-Gi-Oh! ZEXAL	Striker Crossit, Coyote, Fender		
2013–2016	The Daltons	Jack, William	Season 2	
2015–2024	Robin Hood: Mischief in Sherwood	Robin Hood		
2015	Gundam: The Origin II: Artesia's Sorrow	Mash		
2015	Yu-Gi-Oh! Arc-V	Skip Boyle	(episode 1–7) replaced by Billy Bob Thompson	
2019	Sheep and Wolves: Pig Deal	Hobbler	English dub	

==== Film ====
List of voice performances and crew roles in direct-to-video and television films
Year	Title	Role	Crew role, Notes	Ref.
1994	Kizuna: Bonds of Love	Toshi		
1994–1995	DNA^2	Kakimaro Someya		
1996–2003	Gall Force	Born	Movies 2–3	
2001	Ichi the Killer	Kaneda		
2001–2002	Alien Nine	Kasumi's Brother		
2001–2002	Magical DoReMi	Oliver, Reanne's dad		
2002–2003	Mew Mew Power	R2000/Mini Mew		
2004	The Gokusen	Kudo, Additional Voices		
2004	Mobile Suit Gundam SEED	Mu La Flaga (NYAV Post dub)		
2005	Kakurenbo	Tachiji		
2006–2010	Chaotic	Drew, Cerbie, Mipedian		
2007–2008	Tai Chi Chasers	Finn		
2010	Animals United	The Anteater Bob		
2014–2018	Super 4	Black Baron		
	It's All Elementary	JT		

=== Live action series and film (Dubbing) ===
List of live action dubbing roles
Title	Role	Crew role, Notes	Ref.
Big Boobs Busters	Eiji Bando		
The Machine Girl	Shinsuke		
New York Ninja	Switchblade		
The Ninja Dragon	Suzuka Hatai		
The Fifth Dimension	TBD		

=== Video games ===
List of voice performances and crew roles in video games
Year	Title	Role	Crew role, Notes	Ref.
2019	Earth Defense Force: Iron Rain	Takuma		
2017	Syberia 3	Mayor Bouliakine, Dr. Zamiatine, Leon		

== Production credits ==
=== ADR voice direction ===
- Arcade Gamer Fubuki
- Animation Runner Kuromi 2
- Gall Force 2: Revolution
- Gall Force 3: Destruction
- Ichi the Killer: Episode 0
- Joe vs. Joe
- Kakurenbo: Hide & Seek
- Munto 2: Beyond the Walls
- Negadon: The Monster from Mars
- Magical DoReMi
- Mew Mew Power
- Outlanders (CPM Version)
- Pokémon (TV Series: EP516 - EP864 / Movie Adaptions: from Pokémon: The Rise of Darkrai until Diancie and the Cocoon of Destruction)
- Shootfighter Tekken
- Tales of Seduction
- The Boy Who Wanted to be a Bear
- Winx Club The Magic is Back

=== ADR script adaptation ===
- Alien Nine
- Animation Runner Kuromi 2
- Arcade Gamer Fubuki
- Gall Force 2: Destruction
- Gall Force 3: Stardust War
- Garaga
- Ichi the Killer: Episode 0
- Kakurenbo
- Joe vs. Joe
- Munto
- Munto 2: Beyond the Walls of Time
- Negadon: The Monster from Mars
- ShootFighter Tekken
- The Boy Who Wanted to be a Bear

=== Associate producer/Dubbing supervisor ===
- Angel Sanctuary
- Animation Runner Kuromi
- Armored Trooper Votoms
- Descendants of Darkness
- Detonator Orgun
- DNA^2
- Domain of Murder
- Gall Force 2: Revolution
- Gall Force 3: Destruction
- Gall Force: Earth Chapter
- Gall Force: New Era
- Garaga
- Geobreeders: Breakthrough
- Hades Project Zeorymer
- Harlock Saga
- Labyrinth of Flames
- Legend of Himiko
- Maetel Legend
- Maze
- Night on the Galactic Railroad
- Nightwalker
- Now and Then, Here and There
- Patlabor: The Mobile Police
- Patlabor: The TV Series
- Revolutionary Girl Utena
- RG Veda
- Rhea Gall Force
- Sohryuden: Legend of the Dragon Kings
- Tales of Seduction

=== Recording engineer ===
- Arcade Gamer Fubuki
- Animation Runner Kuromi 2
- Gall Force 2: Destruction
- Gall Force 3: Stardust War
- Ichi the Killer: Episode 0
- Kakurenbo
- Joe vs. Joe
- Munto 2: Beyond the Walls of Time
- Negadon: The Monster from Mars
- ShootFighter Tekken
- The Boy Who Wanted to be a Bear
