= Written in the Stars =

Written in the Stars may refer to:

== Music ==
- "Written in the Stars" (Elton John and LeAnn Rimes song), 1999
- "Written in the Stars" (Tinie Tempah song), 2010
- "Written in the Stars", by Blackmore's Night from Fires at Midnight
- "Written in the Stars", by Joey Badass from 2000
- "Written in the Stars", by The Girl and the Dreamcatcher
- "Written in the Stars", by Westlife from Unbreakable: The Greatest Hits Volume 1

== Film and television ==
- Written in the Stars (film), a 1925 German film
- "Written in the Stars", the third episode of the fifth season of Gilmore Girls
- "Written in the Stars", the finale of the eighth season of Winx Club
- "Written in the Stars", the official film of the 2022 FIFA World Cup
