= If I Go Missing the Witches Did It =

Horror podcast

If I Go Missing the Witches Did It is a horror podcast written by Pia Wilson and starring both Gabourey Sidibe and Sarah Natochenny. The podcast consisted of nine episodes and was produced by Realm.

== Background ==
The show debuted in September 2021 and released a total of nine episodes on a weekly basis. The podcast was produced by Realm. Each episode is about half an hour in length. The story was written by Pia Wilson with Jenna Clayton played by Gabourey Sidibe and Elise Edgerton played by Sarah Natochenny. The story follows a white podcaster who is trying to find a black writer who has disappeared.

== Reception ==
The podcast won the 2022 People's Voice Webby Award for a scripted fiction podcast and was also nominated for best writing in the podcast category. Jess Joho wrote in Mashable that the podcast is "a super compelling binge-worthy thriller." Aigner Loren Wilson wrote in Discover Pods that the show is "plain great horror satire."
