= Robin Hood: Mischief in Sherwood =

- Genre: Animation
- Based on: The Robin Hood folklore
- Directed by: Sandra Derval (season 1); Stéphane Mit (season 2); Olivier Derynck (season 3)
- Voices of: Tom Wayland; Bryce Papenbrook; Eli James; Jake Paque; David Nelson (seasons 1–2); Barrett Leddy (seasons 3–4); David Wills; Billy Bob Thompson; Marc Thompson; Sarah Natochenny (seasons 1–2); Kara Edwards (seasons 3–4); Cristina Vee; Eileen Stevens; Cameron Guile
- Theme music composer: Fabien Nataf
- Composers: Fabien Nataf; Alain Mouysset
- Countries of origin: France; Germany; Luxembourg (season 1); India (seasons 1–2); Italy (seasons 1, 3)
- No. of seasons: 4
- No. of episodes: 208

Production
- Executive producers: Aton Soumache (season 1); Tapaas Chakravarti (season 1); Alexis Vonarb (season 1); Jean-Marie Musique (season 1); Sumedha Saraogi (season 1); Cédric Pilot (seasons 1–2); Rouhini Jaswal (seasons 1–2); Olivier Pérouze (season 2); Shona Nivedita Chakravarti (season 2); Manoj Mishra (season 2); Nicole Keeb (seasons 2–3); Arne Lohmann (seasons 2–3); Fabienne Oheix (season 3); Pierfrancesco Gherardi (season 3); Massimo Bruno (season 3)
- Producers: Aton Soumache; Jean-Marie Musique (season 1); Christine Parisse (season 1); Tapaas Chakravarti (seasons 1–2); Olivier Pérouze (season 3); Julien Borde (season 3)
- Running time: 11 minutes
- Production companies: Method Animation; ZDF Studios; Fabrique D'Images (season 1); De Agostini Editore (season 1); DQ Entertainment (seasons 1–2); KidsMe S.r.l. (season 3)

Original release
- Network: TF1 (France); Disney Channel (France, seasons 1–2); ZDF (Germany); DeA Kids (Italy, season 1)
- Release: October 19, 2015 – 2024

Robin Hood: Mischief in Sherwood is a CG-animated series produced by Method Animation and DQ Entertainment (seasons 1–2), in co-production with Fabrique D'Images (season 1), ZDF, ZDF Enterprises, De Agostini Editore (season 1), and KidsMe S.r.l. (season 3), with the participation of TF1 and The Walt Disney Company France (seasons 1–2), and in association with COFIMAGE 24. It is an animated adaptation of the Robin Hood story.

It has 208 episodes over four seasons, which are 11 minutes each. Microsoft opts to pair four of them up as one, reducing the count to 52, with a total of 13 per season (despite the series having aired continuously from June to July 2016).

== Characters ==
- Robin Hood (voiced by Tom Wayland) is the teenage son of the Earl of Locksley.
- Tuck (voiced by Eli James) is based on Friar Tuck and a friend of Robin Hood who helps with Little John in stopping the plans of Prince John.
- Little John (voiced by Jake Paque) is a friend of Robin Hood who helps with Tuck in stopping the plans of Prince John.
- Prince John (voiced by David Nelson [seasons 1–2], Barrett Leddy [seasons 3–4]).
- Sheriff (voiced by David Wills) is based on the Sheriff of Nottingham.
- Rolf (voiced by Billy Bob Thompson) and Ralf (voiced by Marc Thompson) are the Sheriff's twin sons.
- Marian (voiced by Sarah Natochenny [seasons 1–2], Kara Edwards [seasons 3–4]) is based on Maid Marian and an apprentice magician who operates as a spy in Prince John's castle.
- Derke is a dragon transformed into a hamster by Marian.
- Scarlett (voiced by Eileen Stevens) is based on Will Scarlet.
- Flynn is a dog that helps The Sheriff hunt for Robin.
- Matilda (voiced by Laurie Hymes) is Scarlett's mom and Robin Hood's aunt.
- King Richard (voiced by H.D. Quinn) is based on King Richard.
- Stig (voiced by Cameron Guile) is the son of the Viking King, and the tribe's shaman.
- Jack is the tall leader of the rogues.
- Doug is the smallest of the rogues.
- Fillcher is the heaviest of the rogues.

== Series overview ==
Series	Episodes	Originally released	
Series	Episodes	First released	Last released
1	52	19 October 2015	30 October 2016
2	52	11 December 2016	18 November 2018
3	52	2020	2022
4	52	2022	2024

== Episodes ==
Each season has 52 episodes with unique debut dates.

=== Season 1 (2015–16) ===
No.	Title	Written by	Storyboarded by	Original release date
1	"The Conquest of Sherwood"	Olivier & Hérve Pérouze	Sandra Derval	19 October 2015
2	"Royal Lessons"	Olivier & Hérve Pérouze	Frédéric Trouillot	TBA
3	"The Hypnotizer"	Olivier & Hérve Pérouze	Bernard Ling	TBA
4	"The Charlatan"	Sérine Barbin	Olivier Poirette	TBA
5	"The Other Robin"	Fred Valion	Wilfrid Poma	TBA
6	"The Treasure Chase"	Emmanuel Leduc; Cédric Bacconnier	Cédric Guarneri	TBA
7	"The Puppet Master"	Emmanuel Leduc; Cédric Bacconnier	Frédéric Trouillot	TBA
8	"The Sword of Kings"	Sébastien Viaud	Bernard Ling	TBA
9	"Baby Hood"	Jean de Loriol	Wilfrid Poma	TBA
10	"Lubin's Horse"	Dodine Grimaldi	Cédric Guarneri	TBA
11	"Manhunt"	Sérine Barbin	Frédérick Chaillou	TBA
12	"Times Are a Changin'"	Baptiste Heidrich	Guillaume Lebois	TBA
13	"The Magic Arrow"	Fred Valion	Hülya Güç	TBA
14	"A Bottle of Luck"	Olivier & Hervé Pérouze	Guilain de Aguiar	TBA
15	"Hail of Stones"	Fred Valion	Yoshi Tamura	TBA
16	"The Statue of the Prince"	Emmanuel Leduc; Cédric Bacconnier	Bernard Ling	TBA
17	"The Biter Bit"	Dominique Amouyal	Cédric Guarneri	TBA
18	"The Invisible Gold"	Maité Demoulin	Guillaume Lebois	TBA
19	"Princely Flight"	Pierre Olivier	Hülya Güç	TBA
20	"A One and Only Sheriff"	Julien Frey	Aymeric Gendre	TBA
21	"The Pantry"	Camille Couasse; Claire Kanny	Bernard Ling	TBA
22	"The Ransom"	Sandrine Joly	Guillaume Lebois	TBA
23	"Trapped in the Village"	Pascal Bertho	Cédric Guarneri	TBA
24	"The Haunted Castle"	Olivier & Hervé Pérouze	Hülya Güç	TBA
25	"Pigeon Post"	Olivier & Hervé Pérouze	Hülya Güç	TBA
26	"Tuck Hood"	Maité Demoulin; Baptiste Heidrich	Bernard Ling	TBA
27	"The Prince's Party"	Francis Launay; Eric Verat	Cédric Guarneri	TBA
28	"The Letter"	Benjamin Le Bars	Hülya Güç	TBA
29	"The Five Puppets"	Nicolas Digard	Aymeric Gendre	TBA
30	"Mirror Marian"	Camille Couasse; Claire Kanny	Bernard Ling	TBA
31	"The Sherwood Werewolf"	Emmanuel Leduc; Cédric Bacconnier	Cédric Guarneri	TBA
32	"The Prince's Windmill"	Etienne Jeantet	Alexis Gachet	TBA
33	"The Prince's Water"	Pascal Bertho	Aymeric Gendre	TBA
34	"In Pursuit of Flynn"	Vincent de Mul	Bernard Ling	TBA
35	"A Pretty Course"	Mathieu Kendrick	Cédric Guarneri	TBA
36	"Team Work"	Mathieu Kendrick	Hülya Güç	TBA
37	"Musical Mish-Mash"	Francis Launay; Eric Verat	Aymeric Gendre	TBA
38	"The Best of Enemies"	Benjamin Le Bars	Bernard Ling	TBA
39	"The Apprentice Lawman"	Olivier & Hérve Pérouze	Cédric Guarneri	TBA
40	"Betting the Blame"	Maud Garnier; David Robert	Hülya Güç	TBA
41	"The Great Game"	Olivier & Hérve Pérouze	Aymeric Gendre	TBA
42	"The Good, the Bad and the Ugly"	Olivier & Hérve Pérouze	Bernard Ling	TBA
43	"The Ballad of Robin Hood"	Olivier & Hérve Pérouze	Gaultier Buiret	TBA
44	"John the Hero"	Pascal Bertho	Cédric Guarneri	TBA
45	"Child's Play"	Xavier de Broucker	Bernard Ling	TBA
46	"The Alchemist"	Olivier & Hérve Pérouze	Cédric Guarneri	TBA
47	"The Secret Garden"	Olivier & Hérve Pérouze	Hülya Güç	TBA
48	"The Witch"	Olivier & Hérve Pérouze	Frédéric Trouillot	TBA
49	"One Joke Too Many"	Camille Couasse; Claire Kanny	Bernard Ling	TBA
50	"Damsel in Distress"	Emmanuel Leduc; Cédric Bacconnier	Hülya Güç	TBA
51	"Once Upon a Time in Sherwood - Part 1"	Olivier & Hérve Pérouze	Hülya Güç	TBA
52	"Once Upon a Time in Sherwood - Part 2"	Olivier & Hérve Pérouze	Frédéric Trouillot	30 October 2016

=== Season 2 (2016–18) ===
No.	Title	Written by	Storyboarded by	Original release date
1	"Robin and the King - Part 1"	Olivier & Hérve Pérouze	Frédéric Trouillot	11 December 2016
2	"Robin and the King - Part 2"	Olivier & Hérve Pérouze	Luc Blanchard; Sylvie Sanna	TBA
3	"Search for the Spell Book"	Camille Couasse; Claire Kanny	Emily Goldsmith	TBA
4	"A New Recruit"	Marine Lachenaud; Cédric Lachenaud	Gaultier Buiret	TBA
5	"When Isabelle Interrupts"	TBA	TBA	TBA
6	"A Most Surprising Birthday"	TBA	TBA	TBA
7	"Sleeping Richard"	TBA	TBA	TBA
8	"My Cuddly Dragon"	TBA	TBA	TBA
9	"The Parrot of Contention"	TBA	TBA	TBA
10	"The Man in the Clay Mask"	TBA	TBA	TBA
11	"Robin's Bridge"	TBA	TBA	TBA
12	"The Dragon's Egg"	TBA	TBA	TBA
13	"Flute Fun"	TBA	TBA	TBA
14	"A King too Many"	TBA	TBA	TBA
15	"Tuck the Valiant"	TBA	TBA	TBA
16	"The Ghost Coach"	TBA	TBA	TBA
17	"That Thief, Robin!"	TBA	TBA	TBA
18	"A Hero Named Little John"	TBA	TBA	TBA
19	"The Smell of Disaster"	TBA	TBA	TBA
20	"The Gold of the Beasts"	TBA	TBA	TBA
21	"The Bewitched Cup"	TBA	TBA	TBA
22	"Vanishing Marian"	TBA	TBA	TBA
23	"Trapped in the Forest"	TBA	TBA	TBA
24	"Sheriff Robin"	TBA	TBA	TBA
25	"Sherwood on Fire"	TBA	TBA	TBA
26	"Invisible Thieves"	TBA	TBA	TBA
27	"The Knight with a Heart of Stone"	TBA	TBA	TBA
28	"Robin the Gentleman"	TBA	TBA	TBA
29	"A Royal Gift"	TBA	TBA	TBA
30	"Faithful Flynn"	TBA	TBA	TBA
31	"With Good Grace"	TBA	TBA	TBA
32	"The Astrologer"	TBA	TBA	TBA
33	"Rivals"	TBA	TBA	TBA
34	"Scarlett and the Diamond"	TBA	TBA	TBA
35	"Tumult at the Tumulus"	TBA	TBA	TBA
36	"Marian Rules!"	TBA	TBA	TBA
37	"A Dirty Trick"	TBA	TBA	TBA
38	"Blaise the Brawn!"	TBA	TBA	TBA
39	"What a Family!"	TBA	TBA	TBA
40	"Endless Robin"	TBA	TBA	TBA
41	"The Return of the Nightingale Diba"	TBA	TBA	TBA
42	"Strange Damsels"	TBA	TBA	TBA
43	"Uncharted Sherwood"	TBA	TBA	TBA
44	"The Dragon Stone"	TBA	TBA	TBA
45	"A Friendly Little Stroll"	TBA	TBA	TBA
46	"Derke in a Box"	TBA	TBA	TBA
47	"The King and the Hen"	TBA	TBA	TBA
48	"The Invaders"	TBA	TBA	TBA
49	"Burning with Enthusiasm"	TBA	TBA	TBA
50	"The Steward"	TBA	TBA	TBA
51	"Merlin's Book - Part 1"	TBA	TBA	TBA
52	"Merlin's Book - Part 2"	Unknown	TBA	18 November 2018

=== Season 3 (2020–22) ===
No.	Title	Written by	Storyboarded by	Original release date
1	"The Threat - Part 1"	Eddy Fluchon	Pierre Cerutti	TBA
2	"The Threat - Part 2"	Eddy Fluchon	Hülya Güç	TBA
3	"Derke Under Control"	Cyril Deydier	Sandra Derval	TBA
4	"The Wild Dragon"	Nadira Aouadi Moreau & Bruno Regeste	Luc Blanchard & Sylvie Sanna	TBA
5	"Princess in Danger"	Alice Diener & Claire Le Luhern	Matthieu Venant	TBA
6	"The Mentor"	Jérôme Erbin & Eddy Fluchon	Pierre Cerutti	TBA
7	"Robin's Arrows"	Cyril Deydier	Sandra Derval	TBA
8	"Liv's Revenge"	Eddy Fluchon	Marc Crevisy	TBA
9	"Surprise Bread"	Alice Diener & Claire Le Luhern	Jordi Valbuena	TBA
10	"The Kidnapping"	Nadira Aouadi Moreau & Bruno Regeste	Luc Blanchard & Sylvie Sanna	TBA
11	"Without a Noise"	Nicolas Schiavi	Matthieu Venant	TBA
12	"He Who Knew Too Much"	Alice Diener & Claire Le Luhern	Luc Blanchard	TBA
13	"The Diabolical Trio"	Eddy Fluchon & Baptiste Heidrich	Jordi Valbuena	TBA
14	"The Jewel of Peace"	Cyril Deydier	Christophe Pinto	TBA
15	"Unbearably Close Friends"	Nicolas Schiavi	Marc Crevisy	TBA
16	"The Royal Lottery"	Hervé Pérouze	Luc Blanchard	TBA
17	"For a Fistful of Blueberries"	Baptiste Heidrich	Yves Montagne	TBA
18	"The Remedy"	Jérôme Erbin & Eddy Fluchon	Jordi Valbuena	TBA
19	"The Visitor"	Alice Diener & Claire Le Luhern	Christophe Pinto	TBA
20	"The Ransom Runaway"	Nadira Aouadi Moreau & Bruno Regeste	Marc Crevisy	TBA
21	"A Question of Honor"	Nadira Aouadi Moreau & Bruno Regeste	Luc Blanchard	TBA
22	"What a Family!"	Jérôme Erbin & Eddy Fluchon	Sarah Amrani	TBA
23	"King or Queen"	Agnès Slimovici	Jordi Valbuena	TBA
24	"All the Same"	Jérôme Lefévère & Tom Gobart	Marc Sierra	TBA
25	"In Shock"	Jérôme Lefévère & Tom Gobart	Christophe Pinto	TBA
26	"Romance in Sherwood"	Jérôme Erbin & Eddy Fluchon	Luc Blanchard	TBA
27	"Hide in a Bear Hide"	Nadira Aouadi Moreau & Bruno Regeste	Sarah Amrani	TBA
28	"The Mysterious Lamp"	Jérôme Lefévère & Tom Gobart	Jordi Valbuena	TBA
29	"There's Always a Trick"	Alice Diener & Claire Le Luhern	Marc Sierra	TBA
30	"A Nasty Temper"	Jérôme Lefévère & Tom Gobart	Marc Crevisy	TBA
31	"Sparks Will Fly"	Cyril Deydier	Luc Blanchard	TBA
32	"The New Chief"	Nicolas Schiavi	Sarah Amrani	TBA
33	"Eyes Closed"	Eddy Fluchon & Baptiste Heidrich	Jordi Valbuena	TBA
34	"A Pet Dragon"	Sonia Gozlan & Cécile Nicouleaud	Marc Sierra	TBA
35	"Morgane"	Jérôme Lefévère & Tom Gobart	Marc Crevisy	TBA
36	"The New Kid"	Eddy Fluchon & Claire Le Luhern	Matthieu Robert	TBA
37	"Samson Returns"	Jérôme Lefévère & Tom Gobart	Jordi Valbuena	TBA
38	"The Fan"	Jérôme Lefévère & Tom Gobart	Fabien Brandily & Souleymane Diallo	TBA
39	"Beware of the Grumpy Dragon!"	Agnès Slimovici	Jordi Valbuena	TBA
40	"Sly as a Fox"	Eddy Fluchon, Tom Gobart & Jérôme Lefévère	Matthieu Robert	TBA
41	"The Squire with a Heart of Stone"	Eddy Fluchon & Yann Ropars	Gaston Jaunet & Matthieu Robert	TBA
42	"The Parrot Pursuit"	Jérôme Lefévère & Tom Gobart	Jordi Valbuena	TBA
43	"Like Father, Like Daughter"	Nicolas Schiavi	Antoine Poirine	TBA
44	"Derke's Nightmare"	Eddy Fluchon	Matthieu Robert	TBA
45	"The Lord's Games"	Nadira Aouadi Moreau & Bruno Regeste	Jordi Valbuena	TBA
46	"The Beast of Sherwood"	Cyril Deydier	Marion Dramard	TBA
47	"Flynn's Exile"	Alice Diener	Antoine Poirine	TBA
48	"The Poisonous Melody"	Eddy Fluchon, Tom Gobart & Jérôme Lefévère	Matthieu Robert	TBA
49	"A Simple Servant"	Nadira Aouadi Moreau & Bruno Regeste	Souleymane Diallo	TBA
50	"The Collection Chest"	Jérémy Elsair & Eddy Fluchon	Antoine Poirine	TBA
51	"The Ultimate Evolution - Part 1"	Eddy Fluchon, Tom Gobart & Jérôme Lefévère	Jordi Valbuena	TBA
52	"The Ultimate Evolution - Part 2"	Eddy Fluchon, Tom Gobart & Jérôme Lefévère	Marion Dramard	TBA

=== Season 4 (2022–24) ===
No.	Title	Written by	Storyboarded by	Original release date
1	"Katel's Awakening - Part 1"	Jérôme Erbin	Quentin Lebegue	TBA
2	"Katel's Awakening - Part 2"	Jérôme Erbin	Idriss Benseghir	TBA
3	"Prince Little John"	Frédéric Valion	Charlotte Koziel-Rozycki	TBA
4	"The Lady of the Lake"	Cédric Bacconnier & Pascal Stervinou	Sylvain Girault	TBA
5	"John the Good"	Alice Diener & Claire Le Luhern	Romain Villemaine	TBA
6	"The Song of Prince John"	Jérôme Erbin & Eddy Fluchon	Claire Dufresne	TBA
7	"Ragnar and Rognar"	Nadira Aouadi & Bruno Regeste	Elise Neau	TBA
8	"The Voice of Odin"	Jérôme Erbin & Pauline Rostain	Sylvain Girault	TBA
9	"Gold Rush"	Louis-David Delahaye	Manon Serda	TBA
10	"The Other Dragon"	Jérôme Lefévère & Tom Gobart	Claire Dufresne	TBA
11	"The Dragon Hunter"	Jérôme Lefévère & Tom Gobart	Elise Neau	TBA
12	"Hamster and Dragon"	Jérôme Erbin & Eddy Fluchon	Aurélien Ottenwaelter	TBA
13	"The Flying Thief"	Frédéric Valion	Guy Quelquejeu	TBA
14	"All for One!"	Alice Diener & Claire Le Luhern	Sylvain Girault	TBA
15	"Hideout in Danger"	Agnès Slimovici	Claire Dufresne	TBA
16	"Fitzwalter's Treasure"	Louis-David Delahaye	Elise Neau	TBA
17	"Geri the Fearless"	Frédéric Valion	Aurélien Ottenwaelter	TBA
18	"Giovanni the Ball and Chain"	Cédric Bacconnier & Pascal Stervinou	Guy Quelquejeu	TBA
19	"The Conspirator"	Jérôme Erbin	Sylvain Girault	TBA
20	"The Totem"	Perrine Prost & Bertille Rétif	Claire Dufresne	TBA

== Production ==
Development for Robin Hood: Mischief in Sherwood started in April 2011, when Method Animation and Indian animation production company DQ Entertainment announced a new CGI-animated series based on the legendary English heroic outlaw Robin Hood, with the titular character de-aged as a 10-year old for teen audiences as the series focuses on the early days of the legendary English heroic outlaw. DQ Entertainment would handle animation production services for the series.

In April 2012, French broadcasting network TF1 and Turkish television channel ATV joined the animated series as they signed a co-production deal with the production companies Method Animation and Indian animation studio DQ Entertainment to broadcast the series in its home country of France and in Turkey.
