= The Dragon Spell =

2016 Ukrainian fantasy film

- Ukrainian theatrical release poster
- Directed by: Manuk Depoyan
- Written by: Olena Shulga; Svitlana Kutsenko
- Produced by: Dmytro Belinskyi; Ihor Roma; Iryna Manzhosova
- Starring: Kate Bristol; Allen Enlow; Melissa Schoenberg
- Cinematography: Dmytro Nedrya
- Edited by: Manwel Aramian; Vitaliy Arsenin; Vladyslav Arsenin
- Distributed by: ADS Service
- Release date: 13 October 2016
- Running time: 83 minutes
- Country: Ukraine
- Language: English
- Budget: $4 million
- Box office: $1.98 million

The Dragon Spell (in Ukrainian: «Микита Кожум'яка», romanized: Mykyta Kozhumiaka) is a 2016 Ukrainian 3D animated fantasy film directed by Manuk Depoyan based on Anton Siyanika's fairy tale of the same name. The film is about a young boy named Nicky, who saves the magical world and humans from evil.

The film premiered in Ukraine on 13 October 2016. In August 2017, the film was nominated for the Ukrainian entry for the Best Foreign Language Film at the 90th Academy Awards. The film received mixed reviews, with some Ukrainian and foreign viewers and experts finding the film successful and interesting, while some critics characterized it as a technically outdated, excessively clichéd work.

== Plot ==
Nicky is the son of the hero Cyril, who once defeated the evil Dragon. Now, nothing threatens the world, and Cyril lives peacefully with his family, and the skin of the Dragon hangs in his house. Nicky dreams of becoming a hero, fighting evil, but he lacks strength. Because of his pranks, the skin tears, so the father has to stitch it up. The mother, Maria, treats Nicky with condescension, but the elder brother Bohdan mocks him, saying that he is no hero.

Meanwhile, the magician, grandfather Danylo, notices the comet and determines that soon, therefore, the Fire Flower will bloom. Danylo sends his apprentice, the clever but boastful bat Eddie, to deliver a letter to Cyril. The hero goes to see the magician and orders Nicky to stay at home. Despite the order, the boy follows his father, followed by the calf Chubyk. So, Nicky eavesdrops on the conversation, from which he learns that the Dragon was not completely defeated. His spirit has taken possession of the witch and if she obtains the fern flower and the dragon skin, the Dragon will return as strong as ever. Eddie tells Nicky to look for the Fire Flower, which grows in the fairyland of Divinalia. But Eddie clumsily casts a spell that takes him and the boy to the wrong place.

Nicky and Eddie meet the orphan girl Roksolana and her squirrel named Kamikaze in Divinalia. Since Roksolana first calls herself Rocky, she is mistaken for a boy. She agrees to help in the fight against the Dragon, and Nicky believes that this is his opportunity to make his dream come true. The witch senses the appearance of strangers and realizes that Nicky is Cyril's son. She sends the troll Tatya to capture the boy. The troll's attack separates the children. Nicky and Eddie are forced to go further by themselves to the place indicated by Roksolana. At that time, Danylo was building a helicopter together with Cyril and his relatives.

The boy and Eddie are trapped by a witch, who sends ghosts impersonating Cyril and Danylo. But Nicky guesses that they are not real. Then the witch tries to bribe Roksolana, promising to give her a family. The girl refuses to betray her new friends and refuses. Nicky meets Roksolana in an abandoned house where she once lived, but he has no idea about it. The children read a clue that points to an enchanted lake, which opens up an obstacle-filled path to the Fireflower. The path is interrupted by a stone guard who recognizes Nicky and Roksolana as brave. The children tell him that they want to stop the Dragon, and the guard gives them a firefly to help them, which can show where the Fire Flower grows.

Dad grabs Roksolana and runs to the witch. She promises to return Roksolana only in exchange for a flower. The girl recognizes the witch as her mother, who was inhabited by the Dragon. Danylo starts the helicopter and, together with Nicky's parents, moves the device to Divinalia.

Nicky manages to find the Fire Flower, but he realizes that it cannot be given to a witch. Eddie tries to stop the witch, but she grabs the flower and uses it to turn the Dragon's body. When the Dragon intends to burn the children, Dmytro arrives to help with Cyril, Maria and Bohdan. Nicky and Roksolana stealthily steal a helicopter to distract the villain. The boy remembers that only his flame can defeat the Dragon, and provokes him to exhale. Because the hide was poorly stitched, flames shoot everywhere from under it, the Dragon catches fire and explodes.

Nicky's parents congratulate him, and Dmytro tells Eddie that he learned magic well. Roksolana stays in Divinalia with her mother. Eddie sends Nicky and his family home, but messes up the spell again and ends up in Divinalia.

== Cast ==
- Kate Bristol: Nicky
- Allen Enlow: Eddie
- Melissa Schoenberg: Witch / Siringa
- Marc Thompson: Dragon / Kamikaze / Monster / Boys / Narrator
- Mike Pollock: Cyril
- Alyson Leigh Rosenfeld: Rocky
- William Tost: Adler
- Jason Griffith: Goon
- Eileen Stevens: Maria
- Jake Paque: Bogdan

== Production ==
=== Development ===
The development of the project, initially called "Mykyta Kozhumyak and the Fire Flower", began in 2007, but after pre-production, the entire process of computer graphics production had to be completely changed, for which the investors did not have enough money. As a result of the Great Recession, the film was left without funding, and in 2008, the project was completely frozen due to the loss of funding from the project's sponsor, an anonymous Ukrainian businessman.

Film production resumed in 2011 by Panama Grand Prix, with support from Ukrainian investors and Derzhkino, amounting to 4 million hryvnias—one-fifth of the cartoon's total budget. The director of the film, Manuk Depoyan, said that a team of several hundred people actively worked on the creation of the film for two years. According to him, the backbone of the animators was Ukrainian artists, and the animation was created in Kyiv, Kharkiv and Odesa. According to one of the producers, more than 200 people worked on the film.

The film was finished in 2016, and several changes, along with international experience, allowed for a significant enhancement in the appearance of the characters and all scenes in the cartoon's final version. Interestingly, both "frames" and soundtracks from the first versions of the cartoon and from the final work published in 2016 are circulating on the internet.

=== Language ===
The script of the film was written in English so that it could be later edited/adapted by American screenwriters to make the dialogues and scenes more emotional and real. Similarly, the film itself was shot in English in the original, due to the fact that dubbing in English after Ukrainian dubbing is much more difficult than vice versa, due to the specifics of English phonetics and vocabulary.

=== Music ===
The music for the film was written by Serhiy Krutsenko. An orchestra consisting of 62 people was also involved. 7 songs were recorded especially for the film, the main one of which is performed by singer Zlata Ognevich.

== Reception ==
During the first weekend in Ukraine, the film collected more than 5 million hryvnias, and in general, almost 12 million hryvnias for rental, which is quite powerful for Ukrainian film distribution. In Ukraine, the tape was viewed by about 200,000 viewers.

During the first weekend of foreign distribution, "Mykyta Kozhumyak" collected UAH 4.350 million in Poland and UAH 3.071 million in Turkey.[36] In general, the cartoon was released in many foreign countries, such as Russia, Saudi Arabia, Hungary, Poland, South Korea, and Turkey. In total, the film collected $1.98 million at the global box office (in Ukraine and abroad).

=== Critical response ===
The film received mixed reviews from Ukrainian and international film critics.

=== Awards and honors ===
Award	Year	Category	Nominee(s)	Result	Ref.
Golden Dzyga	2017	Best Animated Film	The Dragon Spell	Won	
