= Winx Club season 7 =

Winx Club
- Season 7
- Cover for digital downloads
- No. of episodes: 26

Release
- Original network: Rai Gulp, Nick Jr. Channel
- Original release: 21 September – 3 October 2015

Season chronology
- ← Previous; Season 6 Next → Season 8

The seventh season of Winx Club premiered on Nickelodeon in Asia on 22 June 2015. It later aired from 21 September to 3 October 2015 on Rai Gulp in Italy, and from January 10 to April 10, 2016 on the Nick Jr. Channel in the United States. The season consists of 26 episodes.

Nickelodeon first announced the season at the 2013 San Diego Comic-Con, with the premiere tentatively scheduled for fall 2014. In a press release on April 7, 2014, Rainbow S.r.l. and Nickelodeon officially announced their continuing partnership on the seventh season, with the premiere now set for 2015. Iginio Straffi, the creator of the series, said of the season: "It will be a privilege to partner once more with Nickelodeon on this."

== Production and broadcast ==
At the 2013 San Diego Comic-Con, Nickelodeon confirmed that a seventh season was in production, with the premiere tentatively scheduled for fall 2014. In a press release on April 7, 2014, Rainbow S.r.l. and Nickelodeon officially announced their continuing partnership on the seventh season of Winx Club, with the premiere now pushed back to 2015. Iginio Straffi, the creator of the series, said of the season: "It will be a privilege to partner once more with Nickelodeon on this."

The first episode aired on 22 June 2015, on Nickelodeon in Asia, followed by its broadcast on 21 September 2015 on Rai Gulp in Italy. As a cost-cutting measure, the animated segments and California voice cast from the previous two seasons were not used in this season (during its production, Rainbow was undergoing a multimillion-euro financial loss). Season 7 was animated entirely in 2D Flash animation, and Nick Jr. commissioned the cheaper New York facility DuArt to record the dub. Like the previous two seasons, the copyright to Season 7 is co-owned by Rainbow and Viacom.

== Episodes ==
No. overall	No. in season	Italian title Nick Jr. English title	Italian air date	American air date
157	1	"Il parco naturale di Alfea" "The Alfea Natural Park"	21 September 2015	January 10, 2016
Faragonda shows the girls the Alfea Natural Park, which she created to welcome the last specimens of Fairy Animals along with the Winx's good friend Roxy, the Fairy of Animals. However, an evil bird of prey enters the park and abducts the last specimen of Digmole.
158	2	"Giovani fate crescono" "Young Fairies Grow Up"	21 September 2015	January 10, 2016
Faragonda is deeply concerned as each Fairy Animal has a special talent or secret directly linked with the very order of the magical universe itself. They need to solve the mystery of the Digmole. The six girls, alongside their good friend Roxy, receive the Stones of Memories to travel back in time thousands of years ago and be able to save the Digmoles.
159	3	"Butterflix"	22 September 2015	January 17, 2016
In the Alfea College of the ancient past, Kalshara, a fairy with dark intentions, manages to access an old hall. Crossing an ancient Wild Magic source, she becomes a shapeshifting animistic creature, the first step to obtaining the fairy animals' Ultimate Power. The seven Winx girls fight against the elemental creature cast by Brafilius and after defeating the monster (and realizing that even their Bloomix powers and Roxy's Believix powers are not as nature-based to save the Digmoles), they, excluding Roxy, earn a new and even greater magical power derived from nature itself - Butterflix.
160	4	"Il primo colore dell'universo" "The First Color of the Universe"	22 September 2015	January 17, 2016
Back in the present, the Winx and Roxy organize the inauguration of the Alfea Natural Park, where now there are many Digmoles, saved in the past. The Digmoles however, hide a mysterious enigma. Roxy tires to go on a solo mission, but is approached by Brafilius, who steals her Stone of Memories.
161	5	"Un amico dal passato" "A Friend from the Past"	23 September 2015	January 24, 2016
Brafilius can now use the stone stolen from Roxy to travel back in time, and he also knows how to find the animal with the very First Color of the Universe, thanks to the information that the fairy of animals unwittingly gave him. Roxy is sure that the Winx can succeed in finding the Cry-Cry without her.
162	6	"Avventura su Lynphea" "Adventure on Lynphea"	23 September 2015	January 24, 2016
Roxy calls the Winx in her room at Alfea, because she knows that the MagiWolves species is in danger on Linphea, Flora's home planet. The fairies go to Linphea and meet Flora's parents, who are healing two MagiWolves. The Winx go into the heart of nature to find the source of this dilemma as why the MagiWolves are afraid to enter the forests of nature and the girls see that Wild Magic has contaminated the trees, so transform into their Butterflix forms, but they are thwarted by dark magic trees that drain all their powers - leaving Flora unable to reach the magic seeds.
163	7	"Attenti al magilupo" "Beware of the Wolf"	24 September 2015	January 31, 2016
Miele comes to help her elder sister and the other five fairies, using the antidote get rid of the fungi. Noticing that nature is spontaneously reacting, Flora gets the idea of helping nature itself with her own Butterflix special spell and bonds with the MagiWolf named Armarok.
164	8	"Ritorno al medioevo" "Back in the Middle Ages"	24 September 2015	January 31, 2016
After a few attempts to make Squonk and Amarok become friends, the Winx use the Stones of Memories to travel back to Medieval Italy, where another species of Fairy Animals - Quillcat used to live.
165	9	"Il gatto magico" "The Fairy Cat"	25 September 2015	February 7, 2016
Orlando, a minstrel who knows how to summon the Quillcat, decides to help the Winx. Brafilius ambushes the cat, but Musa stops him with her Butterflix power and bonds with the Quillcat.
166	10	"Winx in trappola!" "Winx Trapped!"	25 September 2015	February 7, 2016
Brafilius fails to catch the Quillcat and finding out if the feline has the Ultimate Power. A furious Kalshara goes to Alfea alone and abducts Critty. Meanwhile, Stella bonds with a Shinygreed named Shiny. Stella and Shiny use their light-based powers to defeat Kalshara and rescue the others
167	11	"Missione nella giungla" "Mission in the Jungle"	26 September 2015	February 14, 2016
The Sumatran tigers are in danger because they are hunted by shapeshifting poachers, contaminated by a source of wild magic, so Roxy asks the Winx for help.
168	12	"Un animale fatato per Tecna" "A Fairy Animal for Tecna"	26 September 2015	February 14, 2016
In the ancient core of Tecna's techno-magical home world, Brafilius has an evil plan to make Zenith unstable. To save the endangered Techsquirrels, Tecna must bring balance to her home world alone.
169	13	"Il segreto dell'unicorno" "The Unicorn's Secret"	27 September 2015	February 21, 2016
Everyone of the girls have their Fairy Animal, except a desperately worried Bloom. Meanwhile, the Winx travel to China to save the pandas from a mysterious creature. When the creature is revealed to be a unicorn under a Wild Magic spell, Bloom must bond with it to restore the wild magic to its natural state.
170	14	"Potere Tynix" "Tynix Transformation"	27 September 2015	February 21, 2016
After finding the magic harmony among them, the six Fairy Animals give the Winx the Tynix bracelets, which will let them explore the Miniworlds - Dimensions that support every ecosystem on a microscopic scale. Roxy becomes head of the Animal Rescue Park.
171	15	"Le pietre magiche" "The Magic Stones"	28 September 2015	February 28, 2016
The dragons are getting weaker since the ancient mystical dragon fire of Pyros Island has been absorbed by the Vampire of Fire. Kalshara demands to be let go in exchange for calling it back.
172	16	"Ritorno a Baia Paradiso" "Back to Paradise Bay"	28 September 2015	February 28, 2016
Roxy warns the Winx that the entire ecosystem is in danger for an unknown reason, so the Winx work hard to solve the mystery.
173	17	"Viaggio in una goccia" "Lost in a Droplet"	29 September 2015	March 6, 2016
The Winx need to grow new Gems of Light, traveling to the Water Cradles where they each have to plant a magic seed.
174	18	"Il rapimento di Stella" "Banana Day"	29 September 2015	March 6, 2016
As the Winx and the Specialists take a group of lemurs back to their natural habitat, a sudden attack by Kalshara and Brafilius who transforms all the bananas into mutated banana monsters, which attack everyone including Brafilius but not Kalshara. So the Winx travel back in time to the past, but encountered a giant prehistoric "Mega Lemur" who have followed the Winx back to the present and proceed to eat the mutated banana monsters. While the Winx have bring back some giant prehistoric bananas to plant at the present because Kalshara and Brafilius have ruined them all.
175	19	"L'arcobaleno di Magix" (Note: "L'arcobaleno di Magix" is misrepresented as "L'arcobaleno di Magic" on the title card.) "The Magix Rainbow"	30 September 2015	March 13, 2016
As an important ball is taking place at Domino Castle, Kalshara and Brafilius are at Graynor Ruins to catch the Creature of the Rainbow Mantle. Roxy warns Bloom via hologram, and the Winx return to Graynor to help the Creature of the Rainbow Mantle.
176	20	"Baby Winx"	30 September 2015	March 13, 2016
Kalshara and Brafilius think that the Animal with the Ultimate Power is one of the Fairy Animals bonded with the Winx, and set a miniaturization trap for the fairies, turning them back into little children as Roxy shows people around the Animal Rescue Park. Still, the Winx manage to beat Brafilius.
177	21	"Pazzo, pazza mondo" "It's a Crazy, Crazy World"	1 October 2015	March 20, 2016
The Winx decide to go back to Alfea with their Fairy Animals. In order to catch them, Kalshara has to find a way to enter the school for fairies. She does so by masquerading as Faragonda's fairy animal, the last Digmole.
178	22	"Il regno dei diamanti" "The Kingdom of Diamonds"	1 October 2015	March 20, 2016
The last of the Digmoles the Winx show to Faragonda says it is bonded with the Alfea headmistress, but Faragonda has vague memories about it. When Bloom realizes that the Ultimate Power is in the Adamantine MiniWorld, the Winx go to the MiniWorld. As Flora uses her magic, she frees the gem which is the Ultimate Power, she also causes the cave to crumble, burying her in a pile of rocks. When Braffilius gets a hold of if, he summons three people the Winx knew all their magical lives - the Trix!
179	23	"Il cuore di Alfea" "The Secret of Alfea"	2 October 2015	April 3, 2016
The Fairy Animals arrive to save Flora. Meanwhile, the Trix begin their second attack of Alfea, with Roxy, Daphne and other fairies fending them off.
180	24	"La farfalla dorata" "The Golden Butterfly"	2 October 2015	April 3, 2016
Outside Alfea, the fight between the Trix and the fairies of the college continues, the Winx use their Stones of Memories to go back to Alfea in the past.
181	25	"Un patto inatteso" "New Magic Harmony"	3 October 2015	April 10, 2016
In the Flower MiniWorld, Bloom is rescued by Elas, whose horn becomes golden for his bravery. Before the Winx arrive at Alfea, the Trix try to destroy the college once again and using the Ultimate Power and their Fairy Animals, But the Trix are warred away from the new magical barrier and sent away and they retreat to Under Realm to find the original source of Wild Magic and obtain its power. The Winx go back to the present to watch the victory of Alfea. At the end, Kalshara comes with a plea to ask the Winx for their help to save Brafilius from the Trix.
182	26	"Il potere degli animali fatati" "The Power of the Fairy Animals"	3 October 2015	April 10, 2016
Kalshara wants to save Brafilius from the Trix, so she joins forces with the Winx, but to contain the Ultimate Power. They must defeat the Trix in order to retrieve the Ultimate Power from the three witches. As the Winx battle the Trix in their newly-hybrid witch form, the Shape-Shifting Witch, they proved too difficult for the Winx as their powers are much weaker than the Trix and their Fairy Animal used the Ultimate Power to form the Infinity Swan - the Trix are encased in the magical orb by the Infinity Swan and the Ultimate Power goes to the Infinity Swan for safe keeping. The Winx use their stones to trap the Trix in limbo and never to cause harm again. After dealing with the Trix, Kalshara goes on a rage - she wanted the Ultimate Power for herself and she shockingly disowns her brother - she then falls into the dark abyss of the source of Wild Magic - after that, Brafilius changes and finds new friends who care about him. The Winx return to Alfea and perform a concert alongside the Specialists and the Fairy Animals.
