= Super 4 (2014 TV series) =

Animated television series

- Genre: Comedy; Action
- Created by: Morgen Studios; Method Animation
- Based on: Playmobil
- Written by: Hervé Benedetti; Guillaume Enard; Nicholas Robin; Cyril Tysz
- Directed by: Cyril Adam; Arnaud Bouron (season 1)
- Voices of: Billy Bob Thompson; Jordan Carlos (season 1); Sarah Natochenny; Kathleen McInnerney (Note: credited as Veronica Taylor in season 2); Mike Pollock; Tom Wayland; Marc Thompson; Kevin T. Collins (season 2); Jake Paque; Toby Fielding (season 2); Alyson Leigh Rosenfeld; Tyler Bunch (Note: credited at H.D. Quinn); Jason Griffith
- Theme music composer: Ingo Frenzel; Felix Raffel; Lars Löhn
- Countries of origin: France; Germany
- No. of seasons: 2
- No. of episodes: 104

Production
- Executive producer: Jean-Yves Patay
- Producers: Tom Kubischik; Carsten Kieckbush; Cédric Pilot; Aton Soumache; Axel Von Maydell; Alexis Vonarb (season 1)
- Running time: 11 minutes
- Production companies: Method Animation; Morgen Studios

Original release
- Network: Channel 8
- Release: August 4, 2014 – April 15, 2018

Super 4 is an animated television series that premiered in 2014, marking the 40th anniversary of the Playmobil toy line that inspired it. The series follows a team of heroes who protect the inhabitants of the distinct worlds of Kingsland, the Enchanted Island, and the City of Technopolis from various calamities and adversaries.

The series was co-produced by Method Animation and Morgen Studios, with participation from France Télévisions and Cartoon Network Italy during the first season. It was produced in association with Turner Broadcasting System Italy for the first season and SOFITVCINE 3 for the second season. Animation services were provided by Vision Globale for the first season and DQ Entertainment for the second season.

The series began airing in August 2014 in the French language. An English-language dub was produced at a later stage. The series has been broadcast by several television channels worldwide, including CITV in the United Kingdom and Minimax TV in Central Europe. In the United States, the series was aired through the terrestrial KidsClick programming block in syndication by stations associated with the Sinclair Broadcast Group.

== Synopsis ==
Super 4 is a crossover story which combines the disparate Playmobil toy worlds of fairies, pirates, medieval knights, scientists, robots, dinosaurs and aliens, by depicting them as inhabiting neighbouring islands in an amorphous ocean. The titular "Super 4" are Alex, a medieval prince, Ruby, a pirate, Twinkle, a fairy, and Gene, a scientist, who along with Alien, a cute bunny rabbit, are united in being exiled from their respective worlds. They band together to have adventures, fight villains, and save their worlds from calamities.

The series starts with the heroes already established as a team of adventurers who travel about in Gene's shape-shifting vehicle, the Chameleon, with their exploits related in an episodic story style. Later their back-stories are revealed via a series of 4-part origins stories. The first of these story arcs, Ruby, Queen of the Seas, relates how Ruby ran away from the pirate world of Gunpowder Island after being told that as a girl she couldn't be a pirate. The second origins story arc, Gene, Techno Explorer, shows how Gene escaped from the authoritarian city of Technopolis, populated by scientists and robots, to explore the outside world in defiance of claims that it was toxic and uninhabitable. Finally the Origins arc tells of how Alex ran away from Kingsland because he felt stifled by his schooling, and went on to meet the diminutive Alien, a refugee from a lost world, and later the fairy Twinkle who was fleeing the Enchanted Island of fairies, witches and trolls after accidentally turning the Fairy Queen into a frog.

== Characters ==
=== Heroes ===
English name	World	English voice	German voice	French name	French Voice	Personality
Alex (Prince Alexander)	Kingsland	Billy Bob Thompson	Jannik Endemann	Alex (prince Alexandre)	Damien Ferrette	A chivalrous knight and heir to the throne.
Gene (Agent Gene 120452)	Technopolis	Jordan Carlos (season 1); Kevin T. Collins (season 2)	Rasmus Borowski	Gene	Franck Lorrain	A very skeptical scientist.
Ruby	Gunpowder Island	Veronica Taylor	-	Ruby	Laetitia Lefebvre	A very impulsive pirate girl.
Twinkle Starglitter	Enchanted Island	Sarah Natochenny	Tanja Dohse	Étincelle	Annouck Hautbois	A cute and joyous fairy who can also be very dizzy and dangerous.
Alien	Lost World	uncredited	-	-	-	A Scooby-Doo-like mascot who is also a team member.

Note: Kingsland is called "Médiévalia'" in the original French version and occasionally in the English version too.

=== Other characters ===
English name	World	Role	English voice	French name	French voice
King Kendrick	Kingsland	Ruler of Kingsland	Mike Pollock	Roi Kendric	-
Princess Leonora	Kingsland	The King's daughter	Alyson Leigh Rosenfeld	Princesse Léonore	-
Wizard Fourchesac	Kingsland	Evil wizard allied with the Black Baron	Tyler Bunch (Note: credited as H.D. Quinn in season 2)	-	-
Black Baron	Kingsland	The King's evil rival	Tom Wayland	Baron Noir	Sébastien Desjours
Queen Fairy	Enchanted Island	Ruler of Enchanted Island who has been turned into a frog	Veronica Taylor	-	-
Grand Fairy	Enchanted Island	Wise old matriarch of the fairies	Alyson Leigh Rosenfeld	-	-
Baba Cara	Enchanted Island	Evil witch	Alyson Leigh Rosenfeld	-	-
Sharkbeard	Gunpowder Island	Pirate leader	Marc Thompson	Barbe de Requin	Bernard Métreaux
Doctor X	Technopolis	Mad scientist and ruler of Technopolis	Jason Griffith (Note: credited as DJ Tanner in season 2)	Docteur X	Vincent Violette
Lenny	Technopolis	Gene's robot assistant	Jake Paque	-	-
Sycronior	Extraterrestrial	Leader of alien invaders, the Sycronians (season 2)	Toby Fielding	-	-
Rock Brock		Adventurer with a 4x4 car (season 2)	Jake Paque	-	-
Agent Franz 6464	Technopolis	Scientist (season 2)	Kevin T. Collins	-	-

Note: Doctor X is referred to as "Professor X" in some episodes, whilst the Black Baron is frequently called "the Dark Baron" or simply "the Baron".

== Episodes ==
The first 13 episodes have an instrumental theme tune, whilst episodes 14–104 have a theme song with English lyrics.

=== Season 1 (2014–15) ===
1. Cleaning Day
The Super 4 introduce themselves as they arrive at Technopolis to get the Chameleon's cloaking system repaired. Whilst there they learn that Doctor X has created a giant cleaning robot, Clean-O, which is promptly hijacked by Sharkbeard so he can clean the world of his enemies.
2. Dragonraiders
Dragons seem to be attacking King Kendrick's castle but on following them back to the volcano on Gunpowder Island, Gene, Ruby and Alex discover they're pirates riding baby pterosaurs armed with flame throwers. Meanwhile, Twinkle tries to galvanize the defenders of the castle, not helped by Alien who keeps fainting with fright.
3. I'm the King
Wizard Fourchesac uses a magic potion to switch identities with the King and, after setting a knight on Twinkle and Ruby, realizes that the knights will do anything he commands, so he decides to use them to invade Enchanted Island and destroy the fairy kingdom. He is foiled when Alex releases the real king from the dungeon.
4. Gene's Four
When the Chameleon's fuel tank is ruptured, the four need to steal some alphaperonium fuel from Dr X's Alpha Tower in Technopolis. But it is guarded by infra-red laser beams, robot guards, and security cameras, and Gene discovers that his medieval friends don't even know what lasers, robots, or cameras are!
5. MindNet
Dr. X's "perfect" Mindnet computer is given control of Technopolis and tasked with eliminating inefficiencies promptly expels all humans from the city. But it's forced to admit it doesn't know everything when, like Gene, it is unable to answer Twinkle's question: Why is sunrise is so beautiful?
6. Princely Wedding
Princess Leonora decides to marry the Baron, but it turns out she had been bewitched by a charm made by Baba Cara.
7. The Great Gonk
In a homage to King Kong, a monkey kidnapped by Dr. X for a Technopolis zoo uses Twinkle's wand to grow enormous and then carries her off to the top of a tower.
8. Baby Dragon
The four prevent the Dark Baron from stealing a dragon egg, but it hatches and the baby dragon imprints on Gene.
9. A Colossal Challenge
The Baron tries to win a jousting tournament by turning himself into a giant warrior whilst shrinking Alex to the size of a doll. But Alex proves that skill matters more than size.
10. Go Ruby
Gene has entered a vehicle in the Technopolis Bot Run (robot race), but Ruby decides to take the place of his robot pilot. When the race turns out to have been rigged by Dr. X, the others realize her life is in danger.
11. The Song of the Stork
Fourchesac is making a love potion to cause Princess Leonora to fall in love with the Baron, but being out of a required ingredient, Stork Song, he uses Crow Song instead. The resultant potion turns the whole castle into lovestruck zombies, leaving Ruby to try and save them by persuading a real stork to sing!
12. Haunted Castle
Doctor X visits Kingsland on a dark and stormy night and uses a robotic ghost to try and steal Kingsland's largest diamond from Princess Leonora.
13. Tower Trouble
The four attack the Baron's castle in the mistaken belief that Princess Leonora has been kidnapped by him.
14. Fog Over Kingsland
The pirates pretend to be ghosts with the help of a fog generator and kidnap some knights during a tournament. But the four turn the tables on them.
15. Ruby, Queen of the Seas - Part 1
In this four-part story about Ruby's childhood, Baby Ruby is washed up on Gunpowder Island in a basket. She aspires to become a pirate herself, but her adoptive father ends up Sharkbeard's prisoner.
16. Ruby, Queen of the Seas - Part 2
To ransom her adoptive father, Ruby tries to solve a maze of puzzles that supposedly protect Kingsland's treasure
17. Ruby, Queen of the Seas - Part 3
Ruby becomes a trainee knight of Kingsland under Sir Ulf.
18. Ruby, Queen of the Seas - Part 4
Ruby flees Kingsland on a dragon to rescue her adoptive father.
19. Saving Prince Alexander
Baba Cara kidnaps Alex, and the others must steal the sacred golden teapot to ransom him.
20. Convoy of Honour
A mystical Crystal Sword must be brought to the King for a ceremony, but the Baron steals it.
21. Operation Swashbuckler
Baron kidnaps the 4 but finds he has captured Sharkbeard instead of Alex. Alex must team up with the pirates to rescue everyone.
22. Sleeping Buddy
Twinkle accidentally puts Alex to sleep whilst he's fighting an attacking dragon. The only way to wake him is to carry him to Enchanted Island to be kissed by a frog.
23. Outlaws of Gravity
King Kendrick unwittingly creates discord amongst the four when he announces he wants to give their leader a gold medal. Suddenly they all want to be the leader and have a race to settle the dispute, which Twinkle wins. Meanwhile, Dr. X has made an antigravity machine that goes haywire so that Technopolis is at risk of floating away into space. Only "Captain" Twinkle has the power to save everyone, but she has been demoralized after losing first her gold medal (which in fact has been stolen by Ruby) and then her wand.
24. The Siege
Everyone in Kingsland castle has been imprisoned in some magical tapestries by Fourchesac so that the Baron can seize the castle. In trying to free them from the tapestry, Twinkle instead manages to get herself, Alien, and Gene trapped too. But once inside she realises that the tapestries are actually a sort of medieval platform game: to escape they need to defeat the big boss and gather a set of keys. Meanwhile, Alex and Ruby are fighting a losing battle as the Baron besieges the castle.
25. Appetite for Destruction
Baron ransoms the Super 4 by telling the king they've been imprisoned by a troll, but then a troll catches them for real and decides to cook and eat them.
26. The Metal Age
Dr. X has made a robotic medieval theme world, Techvalia, but his programming is so good that the robots really believe themselves to be medieval knights, and their ruler Queen Robotia imprisons the population of Technopolis, believing them to be evil wizards.
27. Your Wish Is My Command
A grateful elf, Floppy, who was rescued by the four from Baba Cara, grants their every wish with disastrous results.
28. The Golden Wand
Twinkle enters a magic contest and turns the frog queen back into a fairy in hopes of making amends with her, but the queen's response is wholly vindictive.
29. The Final Countdown
Sharkbeard causes Gunpowder Island to blow up. Using one of Gene's inventions, Alex travels back in time to prevent the catastrophe, but finds he has to try over and over, Groundhog Day style, as things keep going wrong.
30. Spell Book in Danger
Twinkle is awaiting a replacement wand when a dragon eats the Grand Fairy's spellbook, which she was supposed to be guarding
31. Turnips and Old Lace
Ruby finds a treasure map for a golden carrot which is buried in the garden of two fairies who turn out to be witches who turn any visitors into rabbits.
32. The Silence of the Statues
In an episode that is related to a fairy tale, a statue of the fairy queen comes alive and turns everyone to stone with its petrifying gaze after Sharkbeard tries to steal it. As the last person left petrified, it is down to Twinkle to save everyone by figuring out how to get the statue to look at its own reflection so that it petrifies itself.
33. The Prophecy
An alien tribe on the Lost Island makes Ruby their queen because she looks like a person depicted in a cave painting of an ancient prophecy, but it turns out the prophecy also calls for her to be sacrificed.
34. A Pirate's Honour
When Ruby is falsely accused of stealing the Fairy Queen's necklace (which serves as a key to a Lost Island treasure trove), she is dismayed to realize that even her friends think she is guilty. So she steals the Chameleon and sets off by herself to clear her own name.
35. The White Rabbit
Wizard Fourchesac seems to have turned Alex into a rabbit. The others take it to the fairies for help, unaware that it is actually a trojan horse intended to destroy the fairy kingdom. Luckily Alien isn't fooled and frees the real Alex in time.
36. The Goose with the Golden Eggs
After Ruby touches a magic apple she develops a Midas touch, and everything she touches turns to gold. She thinks the pirates will adore her for this but instead they enslave her.
37. Gene, Techno Explorer - Part 1
In this four-part backstory about Gene, Agent Gene lives in Technopolis, a futuristic domed city sealed off from the outside world and controlled by the autocratic Computer Supreme. After detecting signs of life in the supposedly uninhabitable world beyond the dome, Gene designs a vehicle, the Chameleon, for exploring the world outside. His plan is opposed by Computer Supreme and its puppet ruler Doctor X, who doesn't want anyone to leave the city.
38. Gene, Techno Explorer - Part 2
Gene escapes Technopolis with help from crotchety robot Lenny, and arriving in Kingsland, helps King Kendrick's folk repel a dragon attack which had been provoked by Fourchesac (then the king's wizard) hiding a dragon egg in the castle dungeon. Gene discovers a map of the known world in the castle and decides to cross Enchanted Island and try to reach the possibly mythical Lost Island.
39. Gene, Techno Explorer - Part 3
When the Chameleon runs out of fuel on Enchanted Island, Gene meets the fairy Alba and some elves. Despite being scornful of her claim to have magical powers, he and Lenny help her retrieve her wand from a troll whereupon he discovers to his shock that her magic is real when she defeats a fearsome Technopolis robot with a simple wave of her wand and then transforms the Chameleon into a flower-power chariot.
40. Gene, Techno Explorer - Part 4
After a plea from Doctor X, Gene returns to Technopolis to save its scientist population from Computer Supreme which has decided to "archive" (cryogenically freeze) everyone to stop them from following Gene's example and leaving the city.
41. Rage of the Dragon
Ruby is turned into a dragon by the witch Baba Cara, meanwhile the Baron is looking for a dragon to enslave...
42. Negatives
Doctor X has made a cloning machine but it makes negative copies of the 4 who are as evil as the originals are noble. Their evil doppelgangers set about making a clone army to take over the world.
43. All That Glitters
Ruby seeks a hoard of pirate treasure in a boobytrapped cave on Gunpowder Island whose door is unlocked by the last ray of the setting sun, like the door on the Lonely Mountain in The Hobbit.
44. Some Like It Magical
Twinkle starts to float away after being injured by Baba Cara. To cure her weightlessness the others need to dupe the fairies into letting them have some magical honey.
45. The Furious Elf
Baba Cara has turned an elf into an evil gnome and sent him forth to drain the Enchanted Island of color, causing the fairies to become so depressed they lose their powers.
46. Unicorn Lady
A fairy's boyfriend was turned into a unicorn by a love-hating witch, but Alex realizes she just needs a friend.
47. A Robot at the Fairies
When Twinkle makes a mess of decorating the Queen Fairy's palace on the queen's birthday, the four try to use Clean-O (from ep.1) to fix it, with disastrous results.
48. Origins - Part 1
In this four-part story about how the Super 4 met up, Prince Alex rebels against his tutor and runs away from Kingsland in search of adventure. He meets a telepathic Alien who has fled his own country after it was attacked by a monster. They team up to return to Kingsland Castle and save King Kendrick from the Black Baron. Alex realizes that a map in the castle shows a lost island inhabited by creatures that look like Alien and realizes this is where he comes from.
49. Origins - Part 2
Determined to reach Lost Island to help Alien's people, Alex sets out again with Alien. Cautiously traveling through Enchanted Island they encounter the fairy Twinkle, who has turned her Queen into a frog. Fleeing the vengeful Queen, they end up on board a passing ship sailed by Ruby.
50. Origins - Part 3
Ruby gets captured by Sharkbeard's pirates, so Alex and Twinkle disguise themselves as pirates too and go rescue her. Escaping on Sharkbeard's ship, they end up shipwrecked on Lost Island.
51. Origins - Part 4
On Alien's homeland, Lost Island, Alex, Ruby, and Twinkle meet Gene, and save Alien's tribe from attacking dinosaurs. In the end, the five decide to team up to have adventures in the Chameleon, thus sparking the dawn of the Super 4.
52. The Truce
Twinkle has a premonition that the Baron, Fourchesac & Baba Cara have made an alliance to defeat the Fairies. When the 4 try to stop the plot, Fourchesac & Baba Cara imprison them in the fairy's dungeon, but Alien leads Baba Cara on a merry dance leading to her capture.

=== Season 2 (2017–18) ===
A second season started to air on weekday afternoons on CITV on 27 February 2017, and weekday mornings on KidsClick on April 2, 2018 until September 21, 2018. The episodes were broadcast out of order, e.g. new character Rock Brock is treated as a known character before he has been introduced.

1. Special Invaders
The Sycronians have taken over Gunpowder Island, but their mantra "We come in peace" is at odds with their tendency to shoot anything that moves. It turns out they need lava from the island's volcano to fulfill the mission of their great leader Sycronior: to destroy the Earth!
2. Fairy Snatchers
Twinkle is delighted when she is allowed to attend the fairies' flower festival, but the others are suspicious, and the fairies' endlessly repeated reassurance, "All is very very well", only makes them even warier. It turns out that the fairies have been kidnapped and replaced by Sycronian doppelgangers.
3. Migration of Aliens
Alien is behaving strangely. He keeps moving in one direction and never stops, no matter what dangers get in his way! It's impossible to snap him out of his trance-like state, so our heroes help him continue towards... The Lost World, where he joins his people, who are all in the same state! They have to protect a small group from the island's dangers... And it gets even more complicated when Rock Brock gets involved!
4. Sabotage
Doctor X holds a Science v. Magic competition with the fairies, but both sides' efforts keep being mysteriously sabotaged. This time it's not the Sycronians who are to blame but Baba Cara, who is after the Golden Spellbook. In the end, Twinkle and Gene reluctantly team up, as only Science and Magic combined can defeat Baba Cara once she has the all-powerful spellbook in her hands.
5. Light My Fire
The Black Baron pretends he is going to save Kingsland, by getting Fourchesac to make a fake dragon for him to fight. But when a real dragon shows up instead, the heroes manage to lure it away by using the Baron himself as bait after Twinkle turns him into a rabbit.
6. Sharkruby
Ruby enters the contest to pick the pirate's leader, but despite proving she is better than Sharkbeard, the pirates declare him the winner anyway. Ruby is philosophical about the result as she knows the pirates could see she was the best even though they wouldn't admit it, and says she wouldn't want to rule over such a bunch of cheaters anyway.
7. Sir Cleano
Kingsland castle is infested by Pirate Fleas, so Gene calls in Cleano to eradicate them. Unfortunately, the Black Baron hijacks Cleano and uses it to take over Kingsland, so Alex challenges him to a duel using the old Cleano robot.
8. Bittersweet Treasure
Ruby has found a splendid amulet...but it's cursed! The wearer of this artifact suffers terribly bad luck and Ruby is forced to part with it. Easier said than done when you really have rotten luck. Luckily, Sharkbeard steals the amulet and frees our heroes. But a cursed amulet on an island with a volcano can prove to be...explosive! Our heroes chase after Sharkbeard who, despite all the bad luck falling on his head, refuses to let go of his treasure!
9. Let's Be Rational
Doctor X has cowardly abandoned Magda, a Technopolitan scientist, to Baba-Cara. The Super 4 wants to save Magda, but Baba-Cara is unbeatable in the heart of her cursed forest! Chased by the witch, our heroes have to hide in a "funny magic" zone, a bubble of happiness created by the fairies, where the pollen from flowers makes you laugh! But how can they formulate a plan when they are laughing hysterically?
10. Bubble Trouble
A mysterious force is leading all of the residents of Kingsland towards the highest mountain in the country. And Alex is also under its control! Twinkle casts a spell to protect him: a magic energy bubble that surrounds the knight and... Oops, Ruby too! Our bubble-trapped heroes will have to go destroy the hypnotizer beam that is... In the flying Sycronian base! They will have to learn to get along if they want to be effective!
11. Flying Shark
The Super 4, on the Chameleon, are battling Sharkbeard's ship... Which suddenly reveals an ultra-powerful laser and flies away! His ship has been modified by Franz, a Technopolitan who was bamboozled by the pirate. Flying from island to island, Sharkbeard (called Agent SRKBD by the robots) pillages everyone. He seems to be invincible...
12. Enchanted Jungle
The Fairy Queen goes to the Lost World on a quest with adventurer Rock Brock to find the legendary First Fairy, in the hope she gets her wish to be restored to fairy form granted. But the map they are following is a fake, luring them into a trap laid by Baba Cara. But then Gene realizes that a song about the First Fairy which Twinkle knows may be a cryptic message telling how to summon the First Fairy for real.
13. Disenchanted Island
The fairies have been cursed so that they cast random spells every time they sneeze. If they are not cured with baby dragon spit they'll lose their magic forever. Unfortunately, Twinkle gets infected too and mayhem ensues inside the Chameleon.
14. Mine Your Own Business
The trolls ask for help, saying that a dragon drove them from their cave. But it turns out the trolls had excavated their cave all the way to the Lost Island, letting a T-Rex in.
15. A Mad Mad World
Rock Brock removes a magical staff, the Heart of the World, from its setting in the Lost World, causing everyone to swap identities, with the pirates believing they are fairies, the fairies believing they are knights, the knights believing they are scientists, and the Technopolians believing they are pirates. Only the Super 4 are unaffected, as they were inside a protective force field at the time.
16. Maze of Fears
The four discover a mysterious maze on the Enchanted Island which traps each of them inside their worst nightmare. But Twinkle is so used to being scared of things that she can set her own fear aside when she hears Alex cry for help, and the maze's illusions start to unravel.
17. Welcome to the Jungle
Gene and Rock Brock disappear during a televised expedition to the Lost World. Alex, Ruby, and Twinkle discover they have been captured by a hitherto unknown tribe of aliens who plan to eat them.
18. Super 5
Annoyed at no longer being the center of attention due to the Super 4's heroics, Princess Leonora demands to be allowed to join them. To fob her off they send her on a quest to Gunpowder Island which ends with her having an insult contest against Sharkbeard, which to everyone's shock she wins by swearing at Sharkbeard (most of her words are bleeped out). Fortunately, she changes her mind about joining the four when she realizes going on adventures means getting her clothes dirty.
19. Logic and Magic
After taking the sword from the Black Baron's castle, Twinkle doesn't want to be useless anymore. So Gene creates the Logi-Tron to make Twinkle smart but instead made Twinkle act like a logic machine. Will Twinkle snap out of logic and continue to focus on magic?
20. The Dark Unicorn
The fairies take refuge in Kingsland because a unicorn is wreaking havoc on Enchanted Island! The Super 4 have to discover what is happening and save the Fairy Queen's followers. Will they manage to stop the Unicorn of Terror before the Frog Queen, who gets mixed up in everything, starts a war between the Fairies and the Knights?
21. Ricky Rictus
When the Super 4 have to walk to the fairies castle on foot, Ruby falls in a hole and finds a minuscule chest that grants her 3 wishes. But on the third wish, she, then Gene, then Alex, then Twinkle gets trapped in the chest all because of Ricky Rictus. Will the Super 4 stop Ricky Rictus in time?
22. The King's Jubilee
The castle is bustling with activity for the King's Jubilee. But the Golden Teapot, King Kenric's symbol of power, has vanished. Stolen, gone! Rock Brock instantly sets in as a super detective! The Super 4 will have to find the Teapot before he accuses everyone in the castle, including the King himself!
23. Toy Boxed
The Super 4, in a Cleano robot, are kidnapped and brought to the orbiting Sykronian base. They see that their kidnapper is none other than Sykrojunior 1/2, the unbearable and capricious nephew of Sykronior 6, who takes them for...toys! Our heroes will take advantage to try to foil Sykronior 6's plans to destroy the world yet again!
24. Super Fast
To bring different peoples closer together, our heroes and the leaders of each world have decided to organize a great intercontinental race. But the Super 4 discover that one of the participants is a Sykronian imposter! Low blows, gadgets, spells... Our heroes investigate during the most eventful race of all time!
25. Superior
Sykronior has kidnapped a representative from each island to steal their knowledge and create the ultimate Sykronian soldier, Superior! Nothing can stop the Sykronian invasion now. Our heroes come to rescue the prisoners and will have to find the super warrior's weakness... If it has one!
26. Saturday Knight Fever
Gene has agreed to accompany Twinkle to Princess Leonora's Great Ball. He has invented dancing shoes that should allow him to shine on the dance floor... But once they are turned on, it's impossible to stop them! The infamous Black Baron takes advantage of the distraction to kidnap King Kenric. He wants to pretend to rescue the King in order to ask for the Princess' hand and inherit the kingdom. Our heroes will have to track him down with Gene the Dancing Machine!
27. Super Gene
The Super 4 are captured by the Black Baron, but Gene and Twinkle manage to escape. Twinkle challenges Sir Ryan in a duel to free them. Coerced by the Baron, the knight accepts the challenge but doesn't want to fight a girl, so Gene has to step in. No problem, Twinkle will coach him and get him all ready to go. But Gene isn't very athletic and Twinkle can't help cheating just a little. She casts a spell that transforms him into... Super Gene. His new powers go to his head and he overdoes it...a lot!
28. Bodyguards
It's Leonora's birthday and she is finally old enough to receive her first castle as a present! Baba-Cara has sworn that she would get revenge on this day for not having been invited to the Princess' birth celebration. So the Super 4 keep an eye on the Princess all day long, which annoys her so much that she disappears!
29. Twinkle, Queen of the Pirates
Sharkbeard thinks that Twinkle is his long lost fellow of his, but Alex, Ruby, and Gene make her snap out of it.
30. Poetry Party
Leonora organizes the first poetry contest in Kingsland! Our heroes quickly see that something strange is going on. When the poems are recited, they come to life! The Super 4 will try to put an end to this curse before the contestants mention a dragon, the end of the world, or some other minor complication. The problem is that they unintentionally speak in rhyme!
31. Super 3
Twinkle has finally succeeded in restoring the Fairy Queen's normal appearance. For this exploit, Twinkle is authorized to return to the Palace in a prestigious position. Her dream finally comes true and she says goodbye to her friends to remain with her fellow fairies. But our heroes – now the "Super 3" – realize that without Twinkle they can't repel the new Sykronian invasion!
32. Saving Pirate Sharkbeard
Our heroes take in Sharkbeard, whose ship has been stolen. He quickly blackmails Ruby so that she convinces the Super 4 to come to help him recover his "Queen of the Seas". Our heroes and their new forced shipmate discover the thieves and bring the ship back safe and sound. But so as he doesn't lose face in front of his men, Sharkbeard accuses our heroes of having stolen his ship and has them imprisoned. To rescue her friends, Ruby will have to blackmail her blackmailer.
33. The Sky is Falling
A meteorite is being irreparably drawn towards King Kendrick's castle. After a few vain attempts to destroy the airborne object, Gene discovers that the source of attraction is beneath the castle. After getting upset, Twinkle strives to be unpredictable and goes it alone to search the most unlikely places in the castle. And yet she is the one who discovers that this is a Sycronian plot. But what can she do against them alone? And time is of the essence because the meteorite will destroy Kingsland in a matter of moments...
34. Jurassic Safari
Rock Brock and Agent Franz 6464 take the Super 4 and Dr. X on a Jurassic safari.
35. Fairy Happy
Fourchesac has stolen the fairies' laughter so they stop making magic and he is the only magician in all the worlds. But he has forgotten to steal Twinkle's laugh. The Super 4 are determined to give the fairies their laughter back but the mission will get much harder when the laughter escapes the magician's control and contaminates all of the knights in the Kingsland castle. They will have to intervene before everyone dies of laughter!
36. Chasing the Chameleon
The Super 4 watch powerlessly as Sharkbeard steals the Chameleon by surprise and escapes with it! To retrieve it from the pirate, our heroes steal Sharkbeard's ship and chase after him. But the crews on both ships aren't really comfortable. Sharkbeard doesn't know how to use the technology and the Super 4 aren't used to operating a pirate ship. Only Ruby knows how to go about it and struggles to train her crew in the basics of piracy.
37. Wanted Rock Brock
Rock Brock is telling everyone that he smote a dragon with his bare hands! But the dragon was guarding the magic cauldron, which was broken during the battle. The cauldron's owner, an angry elf, promises to grant the wish of whoever finds the guilty party! The Super 4 will have to protect Rock Brock from witches, pirates, and the Baron and his men! If only they could get Rock to admit that he isn't capable of smiting a dragon... But the adventurer is too proud!
38. Move It
When an inert robot is found in the middle of the bridge connecting Kingsland to Enchanted Island, ill-feeling is stirred up between the two worlds. Each side accuses the other of dumping trash on their side. The Super 4 recognize Ex-Nihilo and Gene goes to the Chameleon to get a program to fix it. While it's up to Ruby to be diplomatic, which everyone knows isn't her strong point, Alex and Twinkle go to join Gene and discover that he has been kidnapped! All clues indicate that the Black Baron is behind this...
39. Gray Magic
Fourchesac has managed to take possession of the terrible Grey Magic power! Invincible, he crosses Enchanted Island to absorb all of the magic there. Nothing can satisfy his hunger. According to Twinkle, they wave to unite the Fairies' White Magic with the Witches' Black Magic to stop him. But Baba-Cara hasn't decided to help our heroes... They will have to use cunning... and in a hurry!
40. Princess Ruby
As dictated by custom, in King Kendrick's absence, the Kingsland throne is entrusted to his successor, Alex. But Alex falls ill and is unable to uphold his role. Against all odds, Ruby inherits the responsibility of temporarily governing Kingsland. The pirate is convinced she will be an excellent monarch. But the protocol (which Leonora has decided to follow to the letter) is very clear: a woman on the throne isn't a king, it's a queen! Ruby is forced to transform into a perfect princess. Fighting forbidden! Discovering this, the Black Baron invokes the protocol and decides to marry Ruby to take the throne himself!
41. Super Bad
When King Kendrick holds the sword of power, it goes through every world, but when it goes through Technopolis, it causes Dr. X's cloning machine to malfunction and free the Negative 4, who wants revenge for what the Super 4 did to them, so they kidnap Gene and Ruby and replace them with Negative Gene and Negative Ruby disguised as Ruby and Gene. Will Alex and Twinkle save their friends in time?
42. The Pied Piper of Kingsland
Twinkle accidentally transforms a cute bunny into a hoard of rodents that eat everything they come across. Fourchesac helps the Super 4 with his ancestor's magic flute. The operation is a major success. They congratulate each other with such joy that Fourchesac thinks he is part of the group! Why doesn't he accompany the Super 4 on their next adventures? The Super 4 (politely) refuse. Fourchesac feels angry and betrayed and decides to get revenge...
43. We Come in Peace
What was to be a peace treaty with the Sycronians, the Sycronians replace the normal oxygen with sleeping gas in Technopolis. Will the Super 4 prevent this from happening?
44. Romancing the Opal
Dr. X wants to steal an orb to power up his "new" Maxi-Cleano. But the Super 4 catches him and he falls in love with the Fairy Queen. Meanwhile, Baba Cara invades the island and the Super 4 have to use the orb to defeat Baba Cara.
45. Worlds Apart
This time, the Sykronians attack everywhere at once! When they can't agree on which direction to go, the Super 4 split up, and each head to a different island. This is exactly what Sykronior was expecting, allowing him to calmly set up his latest evil invention in the Lost World, the only place our heroes don't go. Meanwhile, the Super 4 have to tackle situations that they can't handle alone and all end up in prison! Will Sykronior achieve his ends?
46. Heart of a Knight
Though he is supposed to be guarding his father's castle, Alex sleeps like a baby, allowing Sykronior to turn Kingsland into his new vacation home. When our knight wakes up from a strange dream, he discovers his friends and family imprisoned by the Sykronians! Guilt-ridden for having fallen asleep and convinced he has lost his knight's honor, Alex is filled with despair and, for the first time in his life, gives up...
47. Super Rock
The Furious have allied with the giant apes to take control of the Lost World. And when our heroes come to save the Mysterios, they are all captured! All except for Alien, who is obliged to team up with the worst adventurer in the world... Rock Brock!
48. The Truth is Far Out There
A meteorite is being irreparably drawn towards King Kendrick's castle. After a few vain attempts to destroy the airborne object, Gene discovers that the source of attraction is beneath the castle. After getting upset, Twinkle strives to be unpredictable and goes it alone to search the most unlikely places in the castle. And yet she is the one who discovers that this is a Sycronian plot. But what can she do against them alone? And time is of the essence because the meteorite will destroy Kingsland in a matter of moments...
49. Half and Half
In Technopolis, Dr. X presents his new invention: a teleporter. But the demonstration comes to a sudden end when the lower half of Dr. X's body is teleported, while the upper half of his body...remains in Technopolis! The Super 4 have to find the doctor's legs and rejoin the two pieces before they are damaged because the slightest bobo will modify the body's molecular structure and prevent the two parts from recognizing each other and joining. But this isn't an easy task because the doctor's legs might have landed in a very dangerous place...but where?
50. The Pirate Virus
Sharkbeard and his pirates are being chased by Technopolis robots, which take them for viruses! According to Gene, there is only one solution: they have to go to Technopolis to prove to the Cleanos that they are wrong. Easy... But only if the pirates stop acting like hostile organisms attacking the city!
51. All Together Now - Part 1
In the first part of this half-hour episode, The Kingsland forest has suddenly appeared on Gunpowder Island... And it is filled with dinosaurs! Even stranger, Doctor X's Tower now dominates the landscape, firing laser beams at anyone who tries to come close! As they attempt to find the key to the mystery, our heroes will have to escort Sharkbeard, the Black Baron, Baba-Cara, and Doctor X, who also find themselves in this strange land made of pieces of each of the islands. How will they be able to lead an investigation when they are surrounded by their worst enemies?
52. All Together Now - Part 2
In the second part of this half-hour episode, Miniaturized in a Sycronian "snow globe", our heroes have to stop the invasion of their world. By uniting their powers with Sharkbeard, the Black Baron, Baba-Cara, and Doctor X, they should be able to escape from their mini-prison but can they trust the worst people on the entire planet? Of course not! Only Twinkle has a slight chance to save our friends... but only if she doesn't lose the snow globe!

== Reception ==
Common Sense Media gave the series a generally positive write up, describing it as "an entertaining CGI series ... multiple settings and themed characters make for some fun crossover plots." They also felt it offered positive role models: "Friendship and a common goal unite the heroes despite their very different personalities ... the heroes stand up to villains at every opportunity, putting themselves in harm's way for others." However they also had some criticisms, notably that "some female characters (including one of the heroes) come off as fairly dim at times" and cautioned that "Parents need to know that Super 4 ... doubles as a lengthy commercial for Playmobil toys". Regarding the target demographic they said "parents ... will enjoy the show nearly as much (as their children), thanks to witty writing."

Writing for the website Geek Dad, Jamie Greene said "My kids (3 and 6) were riveted to the screener episode we were sent." However, like the Common Sense Media reviewer he had misgivings about the portrayal of female characters: "Alex the Knight is a brave knight. Twinkle the Fairy is a brainless dope. ... notice anything troubling in those gender portrayals?" Despite this, he finished his review by saying "I think it's safe to say that we'll be watching more."

In The Globe and Mail, Kate Taylor looked at the very concept of making TV series about toys. Initially she contrasted Playmobil's ethos with that of Lego in a favourable way, writing: "In the highly segregated world of children's toys, Playmobil gets better marks for battling sexual stereotypes as (its) male and female figures can play a variety of roles. With Lego, you get the predetermined sexual stereotypes of the movies." However, she went on to criticise Playmobil's decision to follow Lego's example in turning their toys into a TV series: "Will naming Playmobil figures and identifying them with on-screen characters in TV and film help children play better? No." ... "It's a sad day for those of us who ... still believe that children can invent their own stories."

== Playmobil sets ==
In 2015, the following Playmobil sets associated with the TV series were released.

- Sharkbeard Play Set - Includes Sharkbeard. Released on June 4, 2015.
- Skyjet Play Set - Includes a Technopolis technician. Released on June 4, 2015.
- Pirate Cave Play Set - Includes a pirate. Released on June 4, 2015.
- Black Colossus Play Set - Includes Black Colossus. Released on June 4, 2015.
- Cleano Robot Play Set - Includes Cleano Robot and Sharkbeard. Released on August 4, 2015.
- Royal Guard Sir Ulf Play Set - Includes Royal Guard Sir Ulf. Released on August 4, 2015.
- Jousting Ripan Guardian of The Black Baron Play Set - Includes Jousting Ripan, Guardian of the Black Baron and a horse. Released on August 4, 2015.
- Lost Island with Alien Raptor Play Set - Includes an explorer, a raptor and an alien. Released on August 4, 2015.
- Doctor X Play Set - Includes Doctor X. Released on August 4, 2015.
- Musical Flower Tower with Twinkle Play Set - Includes Twinkle, a fairy and a Unicorn. Released on September 21, 2015.
- Take Along Black Baron's Castle Play Set - Includes 3 knights,2 horses, and the Black Baron. Released on September 21, 2015.
- Camouflage Pirate Fort Play Set - Includes Ruby and a pirate. Released on September 21, 2015.
- Chameleon Command Vehicle Play Set - Includes Gene. Released on September 21, 2015.
- Royal Tribune with Alex Play Set - Includes the King, Alex and a knight. Released on September 21, 2015.
- PLAYMOBIL 9409 Troll with ruby 18 may 2018
- PLAYMOBIL 9410 The Grand Fairy with Twinkle 18 may 2018
