= Axel: The Biggest Little Hero =

- DVD cover art
- Directed by: Leo Lee
- Written by: Leo Lee
- Produced by: Leilei Hu; Leo Lee
- Starring: Ed Asner; Tim Curry; Matthew Lillard; George Takei
- Narrated by: Ed Asner
- Cinematography: Chuntao Guo
- Edited by: Leo Lee
- Music by: Brian McKenna
- Production company: Zhejiang Versatile
- Distributed by: Gryphon Entertainment; Anderson Digital; Arc Entertainment
- Release date: August 2, 2013
- Running time: 80 minutes
- Country: China
- Language: Chinese

Axel: The Biggest Little Hero (original title: Bonta) is a 2013 animated 3-D film written and directed by Leo Lee. The English-language version stars the voices of Yuri Lowenthal, Sarah Natochenny, Colleen O'Shaughnessey, Kate Higgins, Ed Asner, and Tim Curry. Under its original title of Bonta, the film released nationwide across China on August 2, 2013, as China's very first 3-D film to combine stereoscopic effects with CG technology, representing their highest level of animation.

The English-language version titled Axel: The Biggest Little Hero was released on DVD in the United States on June 3, 2014.

== Plot ==
On the planet Earth, Axel (Yuri Lowenthal) and his best friend Jono (Colleen O'Shaughnessey) go out in search of a magical plant from the Bonta Forest that will feed their starving tribe, but they are threatened by the Lizard King (Matthew Lillard) who wants to take over the forest. The two become friends with a brave princess and a giant ostrich robot (Marc Thompson) who assist them on their journey for the plant.

== English cast ==
- Yuri Lowenthal as Axel
- Colleen O'Shaughnessey as Jono
- Kate Higgins as Gaga
- Ed Asner as Bonta
- Tim Curry as Papa Qi
- Matthew Lillard as Lizard King
- George Takei as Elder
- Marc Thompson as 1st & 4th Guardians, Pootron, Mecha Lizard
- Sarah Natochenny as Boca
- Alyson Leigh Rosenfeld as Second Guardian
- Rebecca Soler as Neepop
- Veronica Taylor as Young Gaga

== Release ==
Bonta theatrical poster

The 3-D film released nationwide across China under its original title of Bonta on August 2, 2013, before heading to film festivals in Europe and South Korea. The project screened October 3, 2013 at the 18th Busan International Film Festival and "won wide popularity among the viewers and Korean media".

=== DVD ===
As Axel: The Biggest Little Hero, the film was released on DVD in the United States on June 3, 2014.

== Reception ==
Common Sense Media gave the film three out of five stars, expressing frustration over the film's lack of immediate resolution while also commenting that they enjoyed the relationship between Axel and Jono. Dove was more wholly positive and called Axel a "charming and unique animated movie". Aced Magazine generally praised the film, remarking that the strangely animated characters would be appreciated by the target audience of small children. They also advised that since the adventure "gets a little rough" for youngsters, they that parents watch the film their children.
