= Bunta Trilogy =

Chinese animated film

The Bunta Trilogy
- Directed by: Lian Li
- Written by: Lian Li
- Production companies: Zhejiang Versatile Media; DuArt Film and Video
- Running time: 82 minutes
- Country: China
- Languages: Chinese; English
- Budget: RMB100 million

The Bunta Trilogy (Chinese: 《昆塔》; pinyin: Kūntǎ) is a Chinese animated film series by Zhejiang Versatile Media. The first movie opened in theaters in China on August 2, 2013. The sequels are currently still in development.

== Plot ==
In the first Bunta movie, which takes place on a faraway planet the size of a peanut, teenage boy Boca goes on a journey to search for Bunta, a legendary cactus plant that may save his community from an impending food crisis. Though wanting to do it by himself as a hero would, he is accompanied by a younger boy named Neepop, who is also his big admirer. The two travel further and further away from home, befriending Wishstick Mountain's Princess Gaga, who joins their cause after an intense fight with a super villain from the Lizard Valley.

== Production ==
Miniature effects were used to produce the first Bunta movie in 3D, coupled with the proprietary technology "Kmoke 9-Axis Automated Frame-by-Frame Synchronizing Technology for Virtual and Physical Cameras" developed by Zhejiang Versatile Media. The precision level of this synchronization system goes down to micrometers.

6,700 AliCloud computers were used to perform the final rendering for the 82-minute feature, the first of its kind in China.

DuArt Film and Video was hired to "adapt the script, audition talent, record voices, score the whole film, create the entire sound design" for the first movie.
