= Winx Club season 8 =

Winx Club
- Season 8
- Title card for the season
- No. of episodes: 26

Release
- Original network: Rai YoYo, Amazon Prime Video
- Original release: 15 April – 17 September 2019

Season chronology
- ← Previous; Season 7

The eighth and final season of Winx Club aired from 15 April to 17 September 2019, on the Rai YoYo preschool channel in Italy. The English version premiered on Nickelodeon Asia on 8 January 2020. In the U.S., all episodes of the eighth season were released via streaming on Amazon Prime Video.

The eighth season of Winx Club was heavily retooled to appeal to a preschool target audience, and it is only loosely connected to the rest of the series. The creative team at Rainbow SpA (which is co-owned by Viacom) restyled the characters to appear younger, and the plot lines were simplified. Most of the show's longtime crew members were not called back to work on this season, including art director Simone Borselli, who had designed the series' characters from season 1 to 7, and singer Elisa Rosselli, who had performed a majority of the songs.

In another change from previous seasons, Nickelodeon's American team served as consultants rather than directly overseeing the episodes; at the time, Nickelodeon was instead working with Rainbow SpA on a new series called Club 57. The American writers remained as consultants for season 8 and Nick's Pierluigi Gazzolo continued in his role as a director for Rainbow SpA. Also during this season's production, series creator Iginio Straffi stepped away from focusing on the series. He shifted his concentration to other work with Nickelodeon, including Club 57, as well as a live-action adaptation of Winx Club aimed at an older audience.

In 2019, Straffi explained his reasoning for gradually lowering the series' intended demographic:

In the last ten years, the animation audience has skewed younger. Nowadays, it's very difficult to get a 10-year-old to watch cartoons... The fans of the previous Winx Club say on social media that the new seasons are childish, but they don't know that we had to do that.

== Synopsis ==
The Winx Club notices that some of the stars in the sky are disappearing. They determine that the return of Valtor is linked to the strange occurrence. The fairies travel to Lumenia, the Magic Dimension's brightest star and the light source for Khia’s home planet of Solaria. Lumenia's queen gives them the power of Cosmix to protect the magical universe's billions of stars. Along the way, the Winx also meet Dora; a helpful golden creature who powers the very core of Lumenia.

== Episodes ==
No. overall	No. in season	Italian title English title	Italian air date
183	1	"La notte delle stelle" "Night of the Stars"	15 April 2019
At Alfea, the Winx are watching the sky for shooting stars. Suddenly, a bright star lands in the forest near the college and the Winx follow it. They find a small yellow creature sleeping in the middle of the crash site, and Stella identifies it as a Lumen: a creature from Lumenia, the star that lights up Solaria. The Lumen has lost her memory, but she recovers it after winning a battle against a group of blue creatures. She then identifies herself as "Twinkly," the messenger of Lumenia, who was sent to find the most powerful fairies in the Magic Dimension. Twinkly asks the Winx for their help against a new threat to the universe's stars.
184	2	"Il regno delle Lumen" "A Kingdom of Lumens"	16 April 2019
The Winx, accompanied by Twinkly, reach Lumenia. There, Queen Dorana explains to them that the stars of the Magic Universe are in danger. She asks them to find out what has drained one of Lumenia's rivers of light, and the Winx find out it was because of a black magic sphere that blocks the flow of the river. After blowing up the sphere, they go underground where they battle two lava golems and a golem robot. But soonly, The Winx's Butterfilx grows smaller and no longer good enough to fight. After defeating the golems, Valtor's mark appears in the air, revealing to the Winx that he is still alive and back into action. After restoring the dried river of light, the Winx return to Dorana, who thanks them for saving the river. She then tells them that in order to save the stars, they will need a new power. Now that the river of light is restored and along with that Dorana's powers as well, she grants the Winx a new power: Cosmix.
185	3	"Attacco al nucleo" "Attack on the Core"	17 April 2019
The staryummies, led by Obscurum, absorb all the energy of Lumenia's core, causing the star to sink into darkness. The Winx use their new Cosmix powers to battle the staryummies, and eventually manage to make them escape. Though it seems the Lumenia's core is lost for good, The Winx finally see that their Cosmix is bigger. Bloom comes up with the idea of using a convergence spell on the core itself, in order to try to restore it. Thanks to their new Cosmix powers, they manage to restore the core successfully. The Winx then throw a party in honor of the Lumens. Meanwhile, however, Valtor is preparing to attack Peripla, a star-ship that fly across the space.
186	4	"Popstar!" "Popstars!"	18 April 2019
At Alfea, Sky is preparing a romantic picnic under the stars for Bloom. But his surprise gets destroyed when the Winx have to leave for a new mission: they will need to save Peripla, a star-ship, from Obscurum and the staryummies. In order not to expose themselves to the lumens of Peripla, Twinkly comes up with the idea of the Winx posing as intergalactic pop stars. The Winx arrive on Peripla, and start a concert in honor of the Peripla lumens. Though their concert is interrupted by Obscurum's attack on the core of Peripla. The Winx transform into their Cosmix form and go battle Obscurum, though they are too late, and the core of Peripla is drained. The Winx use their Cosmix powers to restore the core successfully. Then though, Valtor creates a black hole, which he intends to consume the specialists' spaceship & Peripla.
187	5	"Il segreto di Orion" "Orion's Secret"	19 April 2019
The Specialists' spaceship (the Owl) is about to fall into Valtor's black hole. In the last second, Timmy manages to activate the emergency speed boost of the ship and they manage to escape and perform an emergency landing in Peripla's ships bay. The danger is not over yet though: After the Specialists land in Peripla, the star-ship itself gets trapped in the black hole's orbit, about to fall in. The lumens of Peripla try to move the ship faster away from the black hole, but the ship doesn't have enough power for it. The Winx then use their Cosmix powers to boost up the lumens and make Peripla get out of the black hole. With their boost, the lumens manage to create enough movement energy on the core, and successfully make the star-ship escape the black hole. Meanwhile, the Specialists are in charge of tracking down a mysterious ruby thief who landed on Peripla, and Riven finds him. a chase ensues between the two, But Orion manages to escape, along with the ruby diamond of the core of Peripla. Meanwhile, the Winx have to face an asteroid monster sent by Valtor. The Specialists eventually manage to capture the ruby thief, who's named Orion, and he appears to be a star scientist determined to save his home planet, Prometia, at all costs. The Winx agree to help him restore Prometia, and decides to travel there with him.
188	6	"La stella faro" "Doom of the Lighthouse Star"	21 April 2019
The Winx and Twinkly follow Orion to Iridia, the star that lights Prometia. There, they try to restore the core of the star, unsuccessfully. They discover that the planet's core has been completely destroyed, that even with their Cosmix powers they cannot repair it. Twinkly finds her friend Lumilla and the two have a little tea party. Orion, disappointed by the failure of the Winx to fix the core of Iridia, is contacted by Valtor, who offers him a deal: if he helps him to take out the Winx, he will save Prometia, Orion's home planet, by restoring the core of Iridia. Orion agrees to the deal, and sets up a trap on Prometia for the Winx. He then sends the Winx to Prometia on a false pretence to use a radar he made to fill Prometia with artificial light. The Winx goes to Prometia, but when they arrive at the right spot to place the radar, the trap Orion has set for them is activated, and the Winx falls into it.
189	7	"Trappola su Prometia" "Trapped on Prometia"	22 April 2019
On Prometia, the Winx fall into the trap set up by Orion and Valtor. Fortunately, Stella and Flora manage to escape from the trap and transform in order to free their friends just in time. The Winx then creates a new temporary core of light for Prometia to save the star for the time being, by using a new spell: Cosmix Power Supernova. Meanwhile, on Iridia, Obscurum arrives at the star and transforms all the lumens of the star, including Lumilla, into staryummies. After the Winx gets free from the trap, they travel back to Iridia and arrive just in time to save Orion from Obscurum's dark portal, but unable to save the transformed lumens. Orion apologizes to the Winx for what he has done, and the Winx decides to give him another chance.
190	8	"Negli abissi di Andros" "Into the Depths of Andros"	23 April 2019
The Winx go to Andros, Aisha's home planet, to participate in the festival of the kingdom. an old friend of the Winx, queen Ligea, attends the festival as well. Meanwhile, Obscurum and the staryummies attack Gorgol, the underwater star of Andros. The Winx, aided by Nex, decides to go on a new underwater mission to save Gorgol, and to do so, they use their old power, Sirenix, and dive into the ocean of Andros. Underwater, they face the Hunter of the Seas, a predatory monster sent by Valtor. They manage to defeat it by trapping it in a cave with no way out. They then arrive at the cave of Gorgol, and discover that Obscurum and the staryummies are about to completely drain the core. While the Winx attack the staryummies, Obscurum takes advantage of the Winx not paying attention to him, and blasts a part of the cave's roof, which starts to collapse on Nex, seemingly about to crash on him and kill him.
191	9	"La luce di Gorgol" "The Light of Gorgol"	24 April 2019
In the depths of Andros, Aisha must save Nex, who is in grave danger. Meanwhile, the other Winx try to prevent Obscurum from escaping after the staryummies completely drained the core of Andros, but unfortunately, they are imprisoned inside the core's cave and are attacked by some magical anemones, special flowers that protect Gorgol. After all the Winx, except Aisha, falls into sleep because of the anemones' attack, it seems it's the end of the Winx Club. Aisha eventually understands how to calm the anemones - By using the singing of the lumens of Gorgol. After the anemones calm down and the Winx wake up, they try to figure out a way to use their Cosmix powers underwater, because by using them underwater, they won't be able to breathe. Aisha comes up with an idea right away: she creates a Morphix bubble full of air around the core, and the Winx manage to transform into their Cosmix form and restore the light of Gorgol.
192	10	"Il potere dell'Idra" "Hydra Awakens"	25 April 2019
Valtor decides to attack the star Hypsos, which is located in the star's constellation of the Hydra. When they discover that Hypsos is in danger, the Winx set off on a new mission to save the star. When they arrive on Hypsos, Valtor then uses his powers to turn the constellation of the Hydra into the actual Hydra monster. While the Winx face the Hydra, Musa saves Riven and the two seem to draw closer. The Specialists come to aid the Winx in fighting the Hydra, but it seems nothing affects it. None of the attacks of the Specialists nor the Winx do any damage to the monster. Obscurum opens a giant dark portal for the staryummies to go through, and Bloom comes with an idea to trap the Hydra in the dark portal. The Winx use their Cosmix Power Supernova spell to push the Hydra into the portal, and they successfully defeat it. The monster then transforms back into its original constellation of stars form, and Hypsos is saved. The Winx goes back to Alfea and hold a concert, but during the concert, Riven tries to impress Musa by making one of the projectors near the stage show Musa in the sky above the stage in different poses. Musa doesn't like what Riven did, and leaves the stage at once.
193	11	"Il tesoro magico di Syderia" "Treasures of Syderia"	26 April 2019
Valtor and Obscurum intend to attack a new star, Syderia, and to do so they decide to adapt a different strategy: deception. Obscurum goes to Syderia, and while all the lumens of the star are asleep, He cast a spell on them. He then sends the staryummies to drain the core of the star. Meanwhile, at Alfea, Twinkly informs the Winx that Syderia is under attack. When the Winx come to the rescue of Syderia, they discover that the lumens that inhabit the star are convinced that the fairies have come to steal the treasure of their star, and the Winx are forced to escape them and hide. After going underground, the Winx gets trapped by the lumens and are about to be attacked by them. In the last second, Kiko and Knut come to their rescue. Knut starts making funny things that makes the lumens of Syderia laugh and therefore distracted, so the Winx escape without them noticing it. The Winx then discover that in the subsoil of Syderia there is a mountain of light crystals. They use their Cosmix powers to light up the crystals, and with the crystals light, Syderia is restored. Bloom has the idea of bringing a crystal fragment to Orion, so he can build new cores for the extinguished stars.
194	12	"Festa a sorpresa" "Surprise Party on Earth"	28 April 2019
Bloom goes to earth to throw a surprise party for Vanessa, her mother's birthday. Valtor then decides to attack the Sun, in order to destroy the Earth and hurt Bloom's family and friends. While the Winx goes to the Sun to stop the attack, But then Valtor sends two dark star giants through the sea to Gardenia, to make sure his mission will succeed. Bloom then calls the Specialists for help, and they arrive at no time. Though, it seems their attacks on the star giants are useless, and they continue to march onto Gardenia, now with new minions by their side, the Star Goyles. Meanwhile, The Lumens of the Sun battle the Staryummies that attack the Sun, but then they transform into three Star Champs, which makes the lumens' battle a bit harder. When it seems the lumens of the Sun are about to win the battle, the Star Champs combine themselves into a new form: Star Troll, a much bigger and much stronger version of the Staryummies, that defeats the Lumens of the Sun in one hit. The Winx then arrive at the Sun and starts battling the monster, but are facing a hard time when the monster eats the entire core of the Sun, which makes it go dark. Valtor then arrives at the scene and kidnaps Bloom into another dimension. There, he shows Bloom the situations on Gardenia and on the Sun, and gives her a difficult choice to make: Give him her Cosmix powers and he will stop his minions, or not give him the powers and let her friends and family perish for good.
195	13	"L'ombra di Valtor" "Valtor's Shadow"	29 April 2019
While the Winx are trying to stop the attack on the Sun by the Star Troll, the Specialists have to deal with the two dark star giants that are about to attack Gardenia. Meanwhile, Obscurum goes to Lumenia to claim his throne, and traps Dorana in a magic cage. Valtor tries to take possession of Bloom's Cosmix power by threatening to destroy her world, family, and friends, So Bloom decides to give up her Cosmix powers to him. Valtor tries to absorb the powers, but is rejected by the power itself and is sent to the dimension of limbo. Twinkly arrive at Gardenia with her min artificial core made by Orion, and Sky uses it to blast one of the star giants into pieces, though there is still another star giant left, and no other mini cores. On the Sun, the Winx battle and defeat the Star Troll, which releases the energy sparkles of the Sun's core into the air. The Winx capture the sparkles and hold it in position until Bloom comes back with her Cosmix powers and helps them to keep it at bay. When the Winx are about to give up, Orion arrives and gives them another mini core, in which they insert the sparkles into, creating a new core for the Sun. Meanwhile, it seems the remaining Star Giant is about to reach the shore, but is then blasted to pieces as well by the light of the Sun, now restored by the Winx. The Sun and Gardenia are now safe. The Winx throws a concert on the beach to celebrate their victory. While it all seems like it's over, somewhere in another dimension, Valtor appears to be alive. He is furious that he lost to the Winx again, and then realizes that in order for him to defeat the Winx, he needs the power of the Wishing Star. Since he cannot get close to it because of his dark powers, he decides to free the only ones that can bring him the star, his old friends, from their space-time dimension: the Trix.
196	14	"La stella dei desideri" "The Wishing Star"	29 July 2019
After their last battle, the Winx relax and enjoy a lesson with professor Paladium in the Alfea simulator. Meanwhile, Valtor informs the Trix that he bonded them with him so they cannot escape, and then sends the Trix to capture the Wishing Star, though they fail when the star scatter itself into pieces across the galaxy to prevent the Trix from capturing her and bringing her to Valtor. One of the pieces, a star-shaped box, flies to Lumenia, landing in Dorana's throne room along with Twinkly. Dorana and Argan then send Twinkly to call the Winx. When they arrive at Lumenia, Dorana and Argan informs the Winx what happened to the Wishing Star, and asks them to go on a new mission to save it, by collecting all of its pieces, named Prime Stars, back together, and put them into the Star Case (the star-shaped box). The Winx agree to the mission and decides to first find the Wishing Star Compass, also a Prime Star. In order to find it, they need to enter the first Prime MiniWorld - The Clocks Prime MiniWorld. To do that, they transform into a very old transformation: Enchantix. They enter the Pinball prime miniworld, and find the compass. But when they are about to collect it, a sudden wind shifts around, and a laugh is heard. The Winx immediately recognize the voice of the laugh, and turn around just to find their old enemies behind them: The Trix.
197	15	"Una nuova missione" "Mission for the Prime Stars"	30 July 2019
The Winx, using their new and greater Enchantix powers, battle the Trix inside the Pinball Prime MiniWorld, in the quest of capturing the Compass of the Wishing Star. Every time someone is about the catch the compass, it escapes and bounces around in pinball-shaped world. After a long and funny encounter of the Winx with the Trix, the Winx win the quest and capture the Compass of the Wishing Star. They go back to Queen Dorana, who puts the compass into the Star Case, which activates it. The quest of the Prime Stars has now officially begun!
198	16	"La festa dello Sparx" "The Sparx Festival"	31 July 2019
Faragonda and Griffin announce the beginning of the Sparks Festival at Alfea. While preparing a new concert for the festival, The Winx are alerted by the Star Case that a prime star is nearby. They go down into the Alfea well, where they find a Star Screen - a portal to a Prime MiniWorld, where they go through several levels of the quest of the first prime star, and the Trix follow them there as well. Eventually the Winx manage to capture the first Prime Star, and goes back to Alfea to hold their concert, while the Trix go back to Valtor, who's angry at them.
199	17	"Il vestito della regina" "Dress Fit for a Queen"	1 August 2019
The Winx goes to Solaria, Stella's home planet, to find the second Prime Star. After a clue from the Star Case, They believe that in order to find it, they must make a dress fit for a queen. When they eventually enter the dimension of the second Prime star, the Courage Prime MiniWorld, they are surprised by the Trix. After Stormy and Stella enter a quest of courage held by the second Prime Star, They battle a situation of their own, where they need to overcome their fear and stand up for what's right. After finishing the quest of courage, Stormy appears to be the winner of the quest and takes the Prime star with her back to Valtor, who is surprisingly happy. Stella understands that the meaning of the clue from the Star Case was that she needs to have the courage of a queen, not just a dress fit for one. Though she is cheered up by the Winx and her parents.
200	18	"La valle degli unicorni alati" "Valley of the Flying Unicorns"	2 August 2019
While Bloom is concerned about Sky's safety, having not heard from her for some time, the Star Case informs the Winx that the third prime star is beyond the clouds of Monoceros, home of the winged unicorns. The prime star is protected by a barrier that only unicorns can cross, but they are very wary animals; however, the fairies manage to gain their trust and be accompanied in flight. Meanwhile, Diaspro and Sky are also on Monoceros in search of the lost medallion: during the mission, Sky realizes that Diaspro invented everything, but suddenly they are attacked by a black unicorn.
201	19	"La torre oltre le nuvole" "Tower Beyond the Clouds"	3 August 2019
As they fly past the clouds of Monoceros, the Winx hear someone shout for help and find Diaspro, and Sky not far away struggling with the black unicorn. Flora realizes that the animal is not evil and the fairies manage to calm it thanks to a rainbow show of the other unicorns. The Monoceros Lumens explain to the Winx that the animal no longer trusts anyone after the last person in whom he placed his trust broke his horn. Surprisingly, the black unicorn decides to bind himself to Jasper, who takes advantage of his help to leave the star, while Bloom and Sky quarrel because the Specialist did not tell her to be on a mission with Jasper. Thanks to the unicorns, the Winx and Sky reach the tower beyond the clouds where the third primary star is kept, but are attacked by the Trix. Here Bloom finds himself having to choose between taking the star before Icy or saving Sky from an ice prison, but he decides to trust him and let him go alone: the fairies then get hold of the primary star and Bloom and Sky regain trust in each other.
202	20	"Il cuore verde di Lynphea" "The Green Heart of Lynphea"	11 September 2019
The Winx reach Linphea and enter the Great Forest to retrieve the fourth prime star, but, having reached the Green Heart, they are attacked by the Trix. Even Miele went into the forest, despite Flora having forbidden it because it was dangerous, to help the fairies: Darcy takes advantage of it and, after making Miele pass out with a spell, takes on her appearance, pushing Flora to help her and thus taking her prime star without interference.
203	21	"La gara di ballo su Melody" "Dance Contest on Melody"	12 September 2019
The Star Case takes the Winx to Melody, Musa's planet, where they discover that the fifth prime star has been incorporated into the crown destined for the winner of the dance competition organized annually by Princess Galatea. The Winx and Trix, with the exception of Musa and Darcy, thus find themselves competing on the track in one-on-one challenges to grab the crown. Meanwhile, Musa visits her father and receives an unexpected visit from Riven, who is however under a spell cast by Darcy.
204	22	"Il segreto dell'armonia" "The Secret of Harmony"	13 September 2019
Darcy tries to harm Musa by pushing Riven, hypnotized, to attack her, but the Specialist manages to rebel from the witch's spell of illusions by showing the girl how strong the feelings towards him are. Meanwhile, the other Winx are engaged against the Trix in the dance competition, but in the end it is Stormy who wins the crown; however, the prime star vanishes from his hands and appears to Musa and Riven, as the requirement for conquering the star was to find harmony. The Trix try to take the star by attacking Musa and Riven, but the other Winx arrive to protect them and, at the end of the day, the fairies and Riven organize a small concert.
205	23	"Fra terra e mare" "Between the Earth and the Sea"	14 September 2019
At Alfea, Tecna and Aisha must pass an exam assigned by Professor Palladium within a time limit, but the two do not agree on how to act and end up failing. At the end of the lesson, while the two quarrel, at six fairies the Star Case appears, guiding them to Coralia, where the sixth primary star is located. Since Aisha thinks she is in the sea and Tecna is in the mouth of the volcano, the two fairies have another spat and so the girls decide to separate: while Aisha, Musa and Flora head towards the sea, Tecna, Stella and Bloom they go to the volcano, where they encounter large lava golems that protect the core. Meanwhile, Valtor decides to personally take the star and destabilizes the core of Coralia, overheating it and activating the volcano, which begins to erupt. Tecna reaches the other three Winx to ask for help and together with Aisha she discovers that the primary star is in a shell, but, as they are about to take it, Valtor appropriates it by leveraging the fairies' desire to save Coralia from the explosion of the volcano. The Winx then leave him the primary star and split: while Aisha and Flora save the lumens, Tecna and Musa reach Bloom and Stella and, with Cosmix powers, cool the core by stopping the eruption. Despite the mission's failure, Aisha and Tecna make peace by understanding that they have both been too stubborn.
206	24	"Tra i ghiacci di Dyamond" "Dyamond on Ice"	15 September 2019
The Star Case brings the Winx to Dyamond, a frozen and deserted world on which the seventh and last prime star is hidden. the conquest is fundamental, since those who in the end have more primary stars in his possession will automatically obtain those of the opposing group. Trix also arrive on Dyamond, although Icy was initially hesitant, and encounter a white fox; the Winx also stumble upon her during their exploration, and Sky, gone with them to be near Bloom, picks him up Seeing him, Icy attacks him causing him to end up in a frozen lake. The Winx are transformed into Crystal Sirenix fairies to save him.
207	25	"La volpe bianca" "The White Fox"	16 September 2019
While the Winx save Sky from the frozen lake, Icy meets the white fox: it turns out that Dyamond is the planet of the witch and that the fox is actually her sister Sapphire, transformed into an animal by a shaman witch that years before she arrived on Dyamond and froze everything. Since then, Icy has vowed to become a witch stronger than her and to break the spell. The white fox accompanies the Trix in the subsoil of Dyamond by the prime star, which however ends up in a tunnel, in which Sapphire slips to retrieve it. In an attempt to enlarge the opening with magic, Stormy causes a collapse of the vault, forcing the witches to escape and abandon the primary star; the latter, however, appreciating that Icy has rescued Sapphire instead of abandoning her to danger, hands herself over to the witch. Icy uses the star's power to free herself and the other Trix from Valtor's mark, but the star isn't powerful enough to bring Sapphire back to human, if not for a few moments. Returning to Alfea, the Winx, still having all their stars despite having three out of seven, arrive at the conclusion that the last prime star is the exclusive property of Icy, and therefore they are still tied with Valtor.
208	26	"Scritto nelle stelle" "Written in the Stars"	17 September 2019
The Winx reach Valtor's palace to try to defeat it and take the other prime stars. The group attacks the castle attracting the Trix to the outside and, while Bloom, Musa and Tecna face them, Stella, Aisha and Flora take on the appearance of the three witches to try to catch the stars; however, as they try to deceive Valtor, the real Trix return, forcing the Winx to fight against the wizard, who has turned into a gigantic demon monster. After hearing from Bloom that Valtor intends to destroy the Magic Dimension, Icy does not know who to give the prime star in his possession, but in the end she delivers it to the Winx in order to be able, one day, to save Dyamond and her younger sister. Since the Winx now have four prime stars out of seven, the stars imprisoned by Valtor are released and converge in the Star Case, freeing the Wishing Star. The Wishing Star gives the six Guardian Fairies a wish: after thinking carefully about it, Bloom asks to give the ability to continue protecting the magical universe, safeguarding its stability and harmony forever. The Winx receive a further charge of magical cosmic energy and manage to destroy Valtor for good this time while the Trix leave. Once returning to Alfea, the girls organize a concert and, out of gratitude, a new constellation appears in the sky: the Winx constellation.
