= Sarah Natochenny =

American voice actress

- Natochenny in 2026
- Born: New York City, U.S.
- Occupations: Actress; voice actress; film editor
- Years active: 2004–present
- Website: sarahnatochenny.com

Sarah Natochenny (/ˈnætəˌtʃɛni, ˈnætoʊ-/) is an American voice actress. She is best known for voicing Ash Ketchum and various other characters in the English dub of Pokémon, Alisa Mikhailovna Kujou ( Alya ) in Alya Sometimes Hides Her Feelings in Russian, as well as Alicia in the video game Bullet Witch. She has also edited documentaries for networks such as MS NOW and worked as an assistant editor on the films Life of Crime, Cold Comes the Night, Worst Friends, and Cruise.

== Early life ==
Natochenny was born in the Forest Hills neighborhood of New York City's Queens borough. She is of Russian descent and is fluent in both English and Russian. At the age of 12, she won a bronze medal in rhythmic gymnastics at the Junior Olympics. She graduated from Brooklyn Technical High School in 2005, and studied at the Lee Strasberg Theatre Institute's Young Actors Program, as well as the Upright Citizens Brigade and Magnet Theatre in New York City.

== Career ==
At the age of 18, Natochenny replaced Veronica Taylor as the voice of Ash Ketchum on the English-language dub of Pokémon, starting with the show's ninth season in 2006, as a result of Pokémon USA bringing their English dubbing work in-house over to TAJ Productions and stepping away from 4Kids Entertainment, who have been dubbing the anime since it first premiered in the West in 1998. They would proceed to do the same thing with all of the other voice actors and their characters. She likened getting the role to "being struck by Pikachu's Thunderbolt" and called it "the most exciting moment of [her] life". She also voices various other characters on the show. She faced some fan backlash for replacing Taylor as Ash, which affected her struggles with depression: "One [bout of depression] that wasn't circumstantial but was kicked off by the reaction I got when I first started. You're doing what you love, and you finally book your first huge role on a show that you loved as a child and people are like, 'You're terrible.' That's really painful to experience." Despite this, she would continue voicing Ash and other various characters on the show, including Ash's own mother, Delia Ketchum, although there would be some criticism that it didn't improve for them and some division between fans on who the better voice actress for Ash was. Her voice for Ash would also evolve over time, having her voice be more distinct, slightly more mature, and eventually a more feminine/childlike sound to differentiate herself from Veronica Taylor's voice for Ash, leading to a more positive reception of her voice over time. This would last until 2023, when Ash Ketchum officially left the series at the end of Pokémon Ultimate Journeys: The Series after more than a quarter-century long run. Despite this, Natochenny still voices various characters and Pokémon in Pokémon Horizons: The Series, taking a step back into voicing some smaller roles in the show after more than 17 years of voicing Ash Ketchum in the anime, lasting 9 seasons longer than Veronica Taylor did in the anime under 4Kids, who finished her run after 8 years.

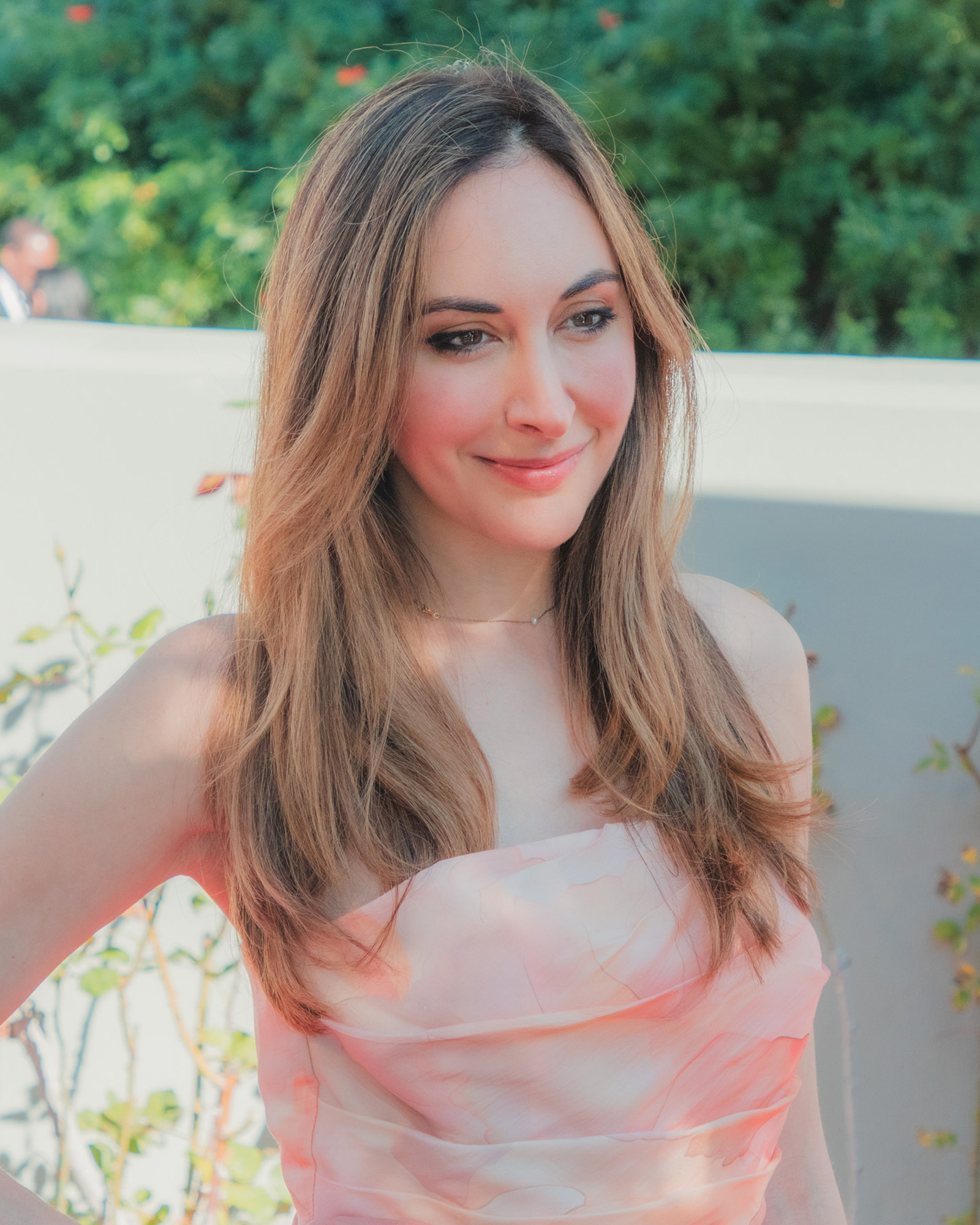
Natochenny in 2026 at the 53rd Saturn Awards

Natochenny voiced Alicia in the 2006 video game Bullet Witch. In 2009, she appeared in videos on the comedy website CollegeHumor. In 2019, she won the Outstanding Animation or Gaming - Demo, Best Voiceover award from the Society of Voice Arts and Sciences. In 2020, she co-starred in the live action pilot I Adore Dolores, which was one of No Budge's top picks of the year. She also appeared in three videos for Vanity Fair, talking about the dubbing process and improvising as never-before-seen characters.

Natochenny has appeared on multiple episodes of The George Lucas Talk Show. She is also a film editor, having worked as the primary editor on documentaries for networks such as MS NOW and an assistant editor on the films Life of Crime, Cold Comes the Night, Worst Friends, and Cruise.

== Personal life ==
Natochenny describes herself as Russian-American and discussed speaking fluent Russian in a 2020 interview with ComicsBeat. She splits her time between Los Angeles and New York City. She has been open about her past struggles with depression.

Natochenny has a cat named after Pikachu. Inspired by a Pokémon episode that dealt with death, Natochenny and fellow voice actress Lisa Ortiz co-founded Voices for Fosters, an organization dedicated to helping rescued animals find permanent homes and advising people on how to foster them. Their website states, "Our goal is to bring the joy of pet companionship to people who didn't think they had the time, end euthanasia and improve care standards for all animals."

== Filmography ==
=== Anime ===
Year	Title	Role	Notes	Ref(s)
2006–2023	Pokémon	Ash Ketchum, Delia Ketchum, Various other characters and Pokémon	Seasons 9–25	
2015–2017	Yu-Gi-Oh! Arc-V	Aura Sentia		
2023	Tokyo Revengers	Yuzuha Shiba	Season 2	
2023–present	Pokémon Horizons: The Series	Various characters and Pokémon	Seasons 26–present	
2024	Alya Sometimes Hides Her Feelings in Russian	Alisa "Alya" Mikhailovna Kujō		
2025	Mobile Suit Gundam GQuuuuuuX	Simus Al Bakharov		
2025	Witch Watch	Riro Takumi		
2026	Chainsmoker Cat	Lani		

=== Animation ===
Year	Title	Role	Notes	Ref(s)
2014–2018	Super 4	Twinkle	English dub	
2015–2018	Robin Hood: Mischief in Sherwood	Marian		
2015	Yoko	Vic		
2016	World of Winx	Venomiya, Silke	Netflix series	
2018	Peter Pan: The Quest for the Never Book	Tinker Bell	English dub	
2018	Camp Camp	Vera	2 episodes	
2018–2020	The Jungle Book	Mowgli	Season 3	
2019–2021	44 Cats	Lampo; Igor; Baby Pie	English	
2022–2023	Natural Habitat Shorts	Hot Cocoa Mug; Owl	Web animation	
2025	Your Friendly Neighborhood Spider-Man	Mila Masaryk / Unicorn		

=== Film ===
Year	Title	Role	Notes	Ref(s)
2006	Pokémon: The Mastermind of Mirage Pokémon	Ash Ketchum	DVD redub version	
2007	Pokémon Ranger and the Temple of the Sea	Ash Ketchum and Clamperl		
2008	Pokémon: The Rise of Darkrai	Ash Ketchum, Ash's Staravia and Dawn's Buneary		
2008	Turn Left at Pennsylvania Avenue	Sketch Performer		
2009	Pokémon: Giratina and the Sky Warrior	Ash Ketchum, Ogin, Ash's Staravia and Dawn's Buneary		
2009	Pokémon: Arceus and the Jewel of Life	Ash Ketchum, Ash's Staraptor and Dawn's Buneary		
2011	Pokémon: Zoroark: Master of Illusions	Ash Ketchum		
2011	Pokémon the Movie: Black—Victini and Reshiram	Ash Ketchum		
2011	Pokémon the Movie: White—Victini and Zekrom	Ash Ketchum		
2012	Pokémon the Movie: Kyurem vs. the Sword of Justice	Ash Ketchum		
2013	Axel: The Biggest Little Hero	Young Boca		
2013	Pokémon the Movie: Genesect and the Legend Awakened	Ash Ketchum		
2014	Pokémon the Movie: Diancie and the Cocoon of Destruction	Ash Ketchum		
2015	Pokémon the Movie: Hoopa and the Clash of Ages	Ash Ketchum		
2016	Pokémon the Movie: Volcanion and the Mechanical Marvel	Ash Ketchum		
2016	Sheep and Wolves	Xavi		
2017	Pokémon the Movie: I Choose You!	Ash Ketchum, Delia Ketchum		
2017	Pororo's Dinosaur Island Adventure	Crong, Hamster, Tricolor (voice)		
2018	Pokémon the Movie: The Power of Us	Ash Ketchum, Toren's Chansey		
2019	Pokémon: Mewtwo Strikes Back—Evolution	Ash Ketchum		
2021	Pokémon the Movie: Secrets of the Jungle	Ash Ketchum and Delia Ketchum		
2021	Ghostbusters: Afterlife	Mini-Puft		
2021	Girls und Panzer das Finale: Part 1	Klara		
2021	Seal Team	Shark		
2023	Mavka: The Forest Song	Kylina	English dub	

=== Video games ===
Year	Title	Role	Notes	Ref(s)
2006	Bullet Witch	Alicia		
2009	PokéPark Wii: Pikachu's Adventure	Celebi, Starly, Staravia, Staraptor, Mismagius, Buneary, Lopunny, Roselia, Roserade		
2009	PokéPark 2: Wonders Beyond	Starly, Staravia, Misdreavus, Buneary, Lopunny, Roselia		
2013	Gangstar Vegas	Roni Q		
2013	Grand Theft Auto V	The Local Population		
2013	Thor: The Dark World	Sif	iOS	
2014	Asphalt Overdrive	Getaway Girl		
2018	Super Smash Bros. Ultimate	Chansey	Archive audio	
2018	White Day	Han So-young		
2022	Pokémon Masters	Ash Ketchum		
2024	Fortnite Battle Royale	Ringmaster Scarr		
2025	Date Everything!	Lucinda		

=== Television ===
List of acting performances in television
Year	Title	Role	Notes	Ref(s)
2024	Game Changer	Herself	Episode: "Pencils Down"	

== Accolades ==
Year	Award	Category	Result	Ref.
2025	9th Crunchyroll Anime Awards	Best VA Performance (English) as Alisa "Alya" Mikhailovna Kujō (Alya Sometimes Hides Her Feelings in Russian)	Nominated	
