= DuArt Film and Video =

American film and recording studio

DuArt
- Industry: ADR Production, Dubbing, Commercial Services, Video Onlining, Sound Design, Audio Mixing, Film Processing and Film Restoration.
- Founded: 1922; 104 years ago
- Headquarters: New York City, New York, U.S.
- Key people: Executive Officers: Irwin Young, Owner & Chairman; Linda Young, President and CEO

DuArt Film & Video is an American film and recording studio founded in New York City by Al Young in 1922. DuArt has contributed to the production of a number of acclaimed films over its history, including Dirty Dancing, The Cider House Rules and Forrest Gump, pioneering a number of filmmaking technologies. Founder Al Young built one of the earliest continuous 35-millimeter processing machines in 1927, DuArt processed the first film in Eastmancolor negative in 1950, and DuArt also worked with CBS on EVR consumer video-player-based special-motion film in 1966. In 1979, DuArt was presented with an Academy Award for Technical Achievement for their development of the Frame-Count cueing system. During the 1980s, the lab became an industry leader in Super-16mm blow-ups, enabling independent filmmakers the opportunity to compete in the theatrical marketplace with low-budgeted films. In 2000, owner and Chairman Irwin Young was awarded the Gordon E. Sawyer Award by the Academy of Motion Picture Arts and Sciences for technological contributions to the motion picture industry.

In 2013, as DuArt began closing their film storage facilities, a number of film archives—including the Academy Film Archive, the Library of Congress, the Museum of Modern Art, the UCLA Film & Television Archive, the George Eastman House, the Harvard Film Archive, and Anthology Film Archives—collaborated to find homes for thousands of orphaned films stored at DuArt, including elements for independent features, documentaries, student films, industrials, shorts, animation, and foreign films. The DuArt Collection at the Academy Film Archive is now home to over five hundred of these films.

On August 25, 2021, DuArt announced that it would be ceasing all of its media services to focus on its real estate holdings by offering production and office space to media companies.

The studio previously opened its doors for anime dubbing, original animation, and commercials, with clients including Viacom, AnimeWho, The Pokémon Company International, 4Kids Entertainment, Accel Animation, J. Kyle's Korner Entertainment and Mondo Media. Their notable works include Pokémon (Season 11–22), Joe vs. Joe, and It's All Elementary (an upcoming claymation television series created by J. Kyle Manzay).

== Production List ==
=== Anime ===
- Ikki Tousen (Seasons 3–4)
- Pokémon (Seasons 11–22)
  - Pokémon: The Rise of Darkrai
  - Pokémon: Giratina and the Sky Warrior
  - Pokémon: Arceus and the Jewel of Life
  - Pokémon: Zoroark: Master of Illusions
  - Pokémon the Movie: Black—Victini and Reshiram and White—Victini and Zekrom
  - Pokémon the Movie: Kyurem vs. the Sword of Justice
  - Pokémon the Movie: Genesect and the Legend Awakened
  - Pokémon the Movie: Diancie and the Cocoon of Destruction
  - Pokémon the Movie: Hoopa and the Clash of Ages
  - Pokémon the Movie: Volcanion and the Mechanical Marvel
  - Pokémon the Movie: I Choose You!
  - Pokémon the Movie: The Power of Us
  - Pokémon: Mewtwo Strikes Back—Evolution
- Joe vs Joe

=== Animation Titles ===
- Alisa Knows What to Do!
- Be Be Bears - Bjorn and Bucky
- It's All Elementary (Note: The full pilot was shown at the New York Television Festival.)
- South India Fables
- Three Musketeers
- The Dragon Spell
- Regal Academy
- Raju the Rickshaw
- Robocar Poli
- Shaktimaan: The Animation
- Shockdeva
- The Snow Queen 3: Fire and Ice
- Hardboiled
- Winx Club (Season 7)
- World of Winx

=== Video games ===
- PokéPark Wii: Pikachu's Adventure
- PokéPark 2: Wonders Beyond
- Bullet Witch: Renegade
