= Sheep and Wolves =

- Russian theatrical release poster
- Directed by: Andrey Galat; Maksim Volkov
- Written by: Maksim Sveshnikov (ru); Neil Landau; Sakhar 1 kg (creative group)
- Story by: Maksim Volkov
- Produced by: Sergey Selyanov (ru); Vladimir Nikolaev (ru); Yuri Moskvin
- Starring: Tom Felton; China Anne McClain; Ruby Rose; JB Blanc; Tyler Bunch
- Music by: Alexandre Lessertisseur
- Production companies: Wizart Animation; CTB Film Company
- Distributed by: Nashe Kino
- Release date: 28 April 2016
- Running time: 81 minutes
- Country: Russia
- Languages: Russian; English
- Budget: $3.4 million
- Box office: $4.1 million

Sheep and Wolves (Russian: Волки и овцы: бе-е-е-зумное превращение, romanized: Volki i ovtsy. Be-e-e-zumnoe prevrashchenie, lit. 'Wolves and Sheep: Cra-a-a-zy Transformation') is a 2016 Russian 3D animated fantasy comedy film, directed by Andrey Galat and Maxim Volkov. The original story, Wizart Animation's first conceived by co-director Volkov, contains elements of the fairy tale The Wolf and the Seven Young Goats and the concepts of a wolf in sheep's clothing. It is about a carefree wolf who likes to hunt sheep, but one day finds that he has been magically transformed into a sheep himself. The film stars the voices of Tom Felton and Ruby Rose.

Although critical reactions were mostly positive in its native country, the film received generally negative reviews elsewhere, with the script, plot, characterizations and lore being heavily criticized; though the animation received some praise. It won the Golden Unicorn Award for best animation film, the Grand Prix from the Seoul Guro International Kids Films Festival and the Catalina Film Festival Crystal Trophy.

Despite the film's poor reception and disappointing box office performance, a theatrical sequel titled Sheep and Wolves: Pig Deal, was released in 2019.

== Plot ==
A sheep named Ziko is attempting to document the outdoor wildlife, when he stumbles upon the wolf Grey, and flees screaming back to his village of sheep, located near a newly arrived pack of wolves in the ravine. The wise leader of the wolf pack, Magra, announces that he'll retire soon, and that two candidates must fight for the rite of succession. One is Ragear, a bad-tempered, selfish wolf who disregards Magra's values for all life, including prey. The other is Grey, who is in love with another wolf named Bianca. However, he acts like a joker, never taking anything seriously, much to Bianca's chagrin. After Grey humiliates Ragear for disobeying Magra's orders, he then encounters the little lamb Shia, who disobeyed his older sister Lyra by wandering into the meadow. Grey nevertheless lets Shia go unharmed.

During a celebration at the wolf pack, Grey humiliates Ragear further, which causes Bianca to end her relationship with him, citing that he's still too immature to be the next leader. Grey visits a gypsy camp celebration and meets the eccentric hare Mami. She gives Grey a transmutation potion, which he hopes will make him change so Bianca will love him again. However, the potion transforms him into a ram. Fleeing from his former pack mates, Grey gets knocked out, only to wake up in the sheep village under Lyra's care.

Grey struggles to cope with being a ram. At first, he tries to convince himself that he's only dreaming, but accepts the truth, until he remembers that it was Mami who gave him a potion. Finding the gypsy camp deserted, he returns to the sheep village. The wolf pack believes that Grey ran away, scared to fight Ragear.

The next morning, Grey is invited by Shia and the talkative Moz to attend the tournament. When Grey finds himself fighting the champion Louis the Fierce, he resorts to biting, which angers everyone. Grey soon earns the friendship of the herd after he protects Lyra and Shia from two wolves. At a welcome party, Grey foolishly inspires Shia to go fight wolves, but the lamb is captured by Ragear, after witnessing him murder Magra and take over the wolf pack. Grey and Moz rescue Shia, but Ragear is informed that Grey has been turned into a ram. He incites the pack to kill all the sheep in the village.

Feeling lonely, Grey returns to the mountains, where he encounters Bianca, who tells him of Ragear's takeover and Magra's death (though unaware that Ragear killed him). He is photographed by Ziko, who then informs the village that Grey is a spy for the wolves. Grey furiously leaves the village, but Shia recognises him as the wolf who spared his life in the meadow. Grey nevertheless leaves, until he is discovered by Mami. The hare informs him that the wolf pack will attack the village, but Grey can transform back into a wolf if he reaches a certain tree by noon the following day. Grey nevertheless returns to the village to warn the flock. He encourages them to fight back.

The next morning, the wolf pack is thwarted by various traps and defenses, until they chase the sheep into a cave, only to be sealed inside with water flooding in. Not wishing his pack to drown, Grey saves the pack, only for Ragear to seize Shia. The lamb reveals that Ragear was responsible for Magra's death, and Grey challenges Ragear to fight for leadership. Mami and Bianca arrive to give Grey the potion to turn him back to a wolf, but nothing happens. Continuing to fight Ragear, Grey is brutally attacked and buried under a pile of rocks, only to emerge as a wolf, sending Ragear falling over a waterfall to his death.

Humbled and having learned maturity while as a ram, Grey proposes to Bianca and they are married in the sheep village, the wolf pack and the sheep herd living together in peace. Nearby, Mami explains that the potion she and Bianca gave Grey was just spring water, and his transformation came from having learned responsibility. She looks on as the village of sheep and wolves celebrate their new united community.

== Cast ==
=== Wolves ===
- Alexander Petrov (Russian) and Tom Felton (English dub) as Grey.

A bumbling and fun-loving young wolf, and the next in line to become the new leader of the wolf pack. Grey was Petrov's first voice role, and he had considered leaving the film after his first recording takes for the character were unsuccessful. However, he was persuaded by director Maxim Volkov to keep practicing his voice talent and started enjoying working for the film.

- Elizaveta Boyarskaya (Russian) and Ruby Rose (English dub) as Bianca.

A beautiful young female wolf, and Grey's love interest. Bianca went through the most re-drawings, sketches and 3D models out of all the film's characters. The designers intended to achieve a "pretty" and "decisive" style for her. The character was originally planned to have light skin, but the final result for her was a wolf with darker blue fur given the light color "looked bad" with Grey. As Boyarskaya explained, considering that Bianca was "so beautiful", she had to speak her lines at a much higher pitch than she was comfortable with, which caused her to "almost [break her] voice."

- Sergey Bezrukov (Russian) and Jim Cummings (English dub) as Magra, the pack's original leader who is later killed by Ragear.
- Andrey Barkhudarov (Russian) and Rich Orlow (English dub) as Ragear, the film's main antagonist.
- Yuriy Tarasov (Russian) and Thomas Ian Nicholas (English dub) as Skinny and Yuri Menshagin (Russian) and Lex Lang (English dub) as Hobbler, the comic relief duo of the wolf pack.
- Kseniya Bolshakova (Russian) and Alyson Leigh Rosenfeld (English dub) as Sarabi and Ekaterina Afrikantova (Russian) and Emily Bauer (English dub) as Leah (both uncredited), two of Bianca's friends.

=== Sheep ===
- Katia Iowa (Russian) and China Anne McClain (English dub) as Lyra, a ewe with red curly hair who runs a hair salon.

Iowa and McClain also sang the film's theme song "Raised High."

- Yuriy Galtsev (Russian) and Ross Marquand (English dub) as Ziko, a neurotic photographer ram.
- Diomid Vinogradov (Russian) and Peter Linz (English dub) as Moz, a talkative, socially awkward ram in love with Lyra.
- Nikita Prozorovskiy (Russian) and Tyler Bunch (English dub) as Belgur, the superstitious, aged leader of the sheep village.
- Ekaterina Semyonova (Russian) and Alyson Leigh Rosenfeld (English dub) as Shia, Lyra's mischievous younger brother.
- Eduard Dvinskikh (Russian) and Marc Thompson (English dub) as Ike, a gluttonous but good-natured ram.
- Dmitriy Filimonov (Russian) and JB Blanc (English dub) as Louis, dubbed "King Louis the Fierce", the much-adored Horns & Hooves Tournament fighting champion.
- Andrey Rozhkov (Russian) and Cummings (English dub) as Klif, a seagull pretending to be a sheep.
- Irina Vilenkina (Russian) and Sarah Natochenny (English dub) as Xavi.

=== Other animals ===
- Tatyana Shitova (Russian) and Jennie Grace (English dub) as Mami, a gypsy jackrabbit.
- Aleksandr Noskov (Russian) and Jim Cummings (English dub) as Baron, Mami's gypsy partner and entertainer rabbit.
- Oleg Morozov (Russian) and Tyler Bunch (English dub) as Bucho, an ox living in the sheep village.

== Concept ==
The story of Sheep and Wolves is loosely based on the elements of the German fairy tale The Wolf and the Seven Young Kids and the concepts of a wolf in sheep's clothing. Director Maksim Volkov explained that the staff at Wizart conceived a film of showcasing these ideas using a body-exchange story formula used in many popular comedy stories, describing it as a "funny and kind" idea to show to all viewers. The film features messages about friendship and how to properly deal with another group of people. Volkov described the sheep in the film as elves or hobbits and the wolves as warlike nomads: "It was important for us to create a contrast, since the protagonist turns from a wolf into a ram, and therefore acquires the qualities of another 'person' and loses traits peculiar to wolves."

According to a writer for Expert magazine, many film viewers noticed similarities between the plots of Sheep and Wolves and another Russian animated film that was released in Russian theaters in March 2016 named Kikoriki: Legend of the Golden Dragon (2017). The film involves its protagonist Barash transforming into a caterpillar by wearing a helmet invented by a scientist at Kikoriki Island. The Expert journalist noted identical messages between the two films about a person not being himself to the point of not recognizing who he really is. The only difference these two films was the relationship aspects between characters. As the journalist analyzed, "Unlike the Smeshariki, where the personal relationships between the almost sexless heroes have already been established, the Romantic line is clearly drawn in the Wolves and Sheep: the main character-Grey the wolf is not very clever trying to attract the attention of the wolf Bianca – this is one of the obstacles that he has to overcome in a duel with himself."

The main characters in the film – wolves and sheep aren't completely animals. Instead the animators humanized them into anthropomorphic characters. The civilized animal characters live in a utopian forest society where they walk on hind legs. The sheep are depicted at the highest rung in the civilization ladder who live in houses and use industrial society household items. The animators presented the setting as a typical evergreen forest in Central Russia although there are exotic elements added such as elephants as a reference to The Elephants by Salvador Dalí.

== Production ==
=== Development ===
Wizart Animation began working on the Sheep and Wolves ever since 2012. The film was Wizart's first original story. The film became a joint venture between Wizart and CTB Film Company. Sergey Selyanov of CTB Film Company, took part in producing the film. The film was the directorial debut of Andrey Galat and Maksim Volkov. American scriptwriter Neil Landau (Don't Tell Mom the Babysitter's Dead, Tad, The Lost Explorer) joined the script-writing team that included the group Sakhar 1 kg ("Sugar, 1 kg", Yolki) as well as Maksim Sveshnikov (Dobrynya and The Dragon, The Snow Queen) who adapted the classic story of a wolf in sheep's clothing theme into a full-fledged comedy film.

The writers presented an innovative new approach when drawing inspiration from the source material. This time they presented the Big Bad Wolf as a protagonist. The writers noted wolves and sheep are irreconcilable enemies. They presented how warring factions must find common ground with each other evoking another theme of friendship especially described between the characters interactions of Bianca and Lyra. The peaceful sheep society resembles a civilization similar to the Roman civilization. The society suddenly finds themselves confronting a barbaric wolf clan. The idea is similar to the plot in the Franco-Belgian comic book series Asterix.

The script played with philosophical arguments such as sanctity of life. The speeches of the wolf leader characters of the wolf pack parallel the rhetoric of politicians in human history that aligns with modern realities. The film portrayed the character Magra as a wise leader of the wolf pack who defends the laws of his ancestors and teaches other wolves to live in harmony with nature: "We do not hunt for sport. We catch only what we need to survive. Every life is sacred. A leader that doesn't respect the laws of our ancestors will bring death to the pack." The inviolability of life, "only taking as much food as they need to eat and never killing for the sake of killing alone" is explored by the character Ragear who is portrayed in the film as the new successor of the wolf pack who wants to hunt the sheep with a laissez-faire mentality making the sacrosanct laws of the character Magra and the ancestors void. The film will present Grey, the main character among this struggle, who is portrayed as a second in command intended on persuading the wolf clan to follow the principles of democracy.

Sheep and Wolves took five years to make. The film went through around three months of pre-production and was noteworthy for its international collaboration from several nations such as New Zealand, India and United States production companies. On 5 November 2014, the American Film Market hosted the film's exhibition. There the film signed to be released to the cinemas in Australia. The largest international market for audiovisual content, MIPCOM, held in Cannes from 5 to 8 October 2015 hosted the presentation of the film. Russian newspapers TASS and Izvestia included Sheep and Wolves in the top ten most anticipated films of 2016. Cartoon Brew labelled the film in its catalog of "Animated Feature Films to Look for in 2016."

An acclaimed cast was announced from both Russian and international versions. The film starred Alexander Petrov (Attraction) as Grey, Elizaveta Boyarskaya (Three Heroes on the Distant Shores) as Bianca, Sergey Bezrukov (The Ballad of Uhlans) as Magra, Andrey Rozhkov (Lucky Case) as Seagull, Yuri Galtsev (Rzhevsky Versus Napoleon) as Zico, and singer Katia Iowa as Lyra.

Todd Resnick of The Voice Company, in Burbank, California. was announced as voice director who picked the international cast that included Tom Felton (Draco Malfoy- Harry Potter) as Grey the wolf, Ruby Rose as Bianca, and China Anne McClain as Lyra. For the Bulgarian voice cast, singers and actors performed including Raffi Boghosian, Michael Filev, Joanna Dragneva (bg) and Nencho Balabanov.

=== Animation ===
Animators used 3D stereoscopy art for the sheep and wolves characters of the film. The animation department's most complex assignment was having to deal with controlling the wool for the characters. Volkov explained that "working with wool took a lot of time and became a serious test of the professionalism of our animators." The characters with "straight" hair had only two layers of fur, while figures with woolly hair was made up of many layers. Thus, the scenes that regard the wolf pack were produced first. The amount of wool a character had in each shot was determined by their distance from the camera to achieve an "organic" look.

Volkov described the tournament scene, with consisted of 1,300 sheep figures, as the most difficult to animate. The smoothness of Cliff's feather was another part of the animation labeled by the Volkov as hard to work with. All of the animators watched animal behavior and nature as reference to make the film look realistic. Programmers from Ireland were hired to convey naturalistic plant and tree growth by analyzing time lapse videos of plant germination. Translations also presented a challenge because the comedic lines had the potential to be misinterpreted.

=== Soundtrack ===
Composer Alexandre Lessertisseur, who has previously worked on such films as Glacé and Manon, 20 Years orchestrated the original score. The film's audio production took place in New Zealand and Scotland. The theme song "Raised High" were performed by Katia Iowa for the Russian release and by China Anne McClain for the international release. In July 2016, the score was nominated for the Jerry Goldsmith Awards in the category "best score for a full-length film."

== Cultural references ==
Sheep and Wolves features references to several films and media:

- The wolf and sheep groups are a reference to the Roman and Gaul groups in the comic book series Asterix
- Grey's species transformation references Queen Elinor turning into a bear after eating a cake in the film Brave (2012)
- Weburg described a scene from the film as a reference to 300 (2007), the wolves of the film being similar to Persians
- Klif the seagull is a reference to seagull Scuttle in The Little Mermaid
- Seagulls aerial attack on the wolves is a reference to the Gwaihir eagle aerial battles in the Lord of the Rings
- References to Hedgehog in the Fog by Yuri Norstein as well as The Elephants by Salvador Dalí
- When the hero voices through a helmet is a reference to Darth Vader
- References to The Lion King

== Release ==
=== Theatrical ===
Wizart Animation revealed the opening of the film will be in April 2016 in the Baltics and Bulgaria followed up with summer releases in Poland, Croatia, Slovenia, Bosnia and Herzegovina, Serbia, Montenegro, Macedonia, Kosovo and Albania. Sheep and Wolves had a pre-release on 22 April 2016 in Romania. A pre-screening of Sheep and Wolves took place in the Voronezh-based theater Star & Mlad on 23 April 2016. The government of Voronezh assisted in having children from eight boarding schools to attend the premiere. Sheep and Wolves was one of the most anticipated films in Russian cinema in 2016 according to TASS. Sheep and Wolves made its official Russian theatrical premiere on 28 April 2016.

In the summer and autumn of 2016, the film released in more than forty countries, including Poland, Croatia and Slovenia. The film ran at the 2016 Russian Film Week in London. Festival director Filip Perkon said that animated films like Sheep and Wolves would be the easiest Russian films to reach audiences from across the globe. The cartoon was launched in cinemas in Italy on 17 November 2016. In Poland, the film was shown on 140 screens. Sheep and Wolves released in cinemas in Portugal (Lanterna de Pedra Filmes) on 5 January 2017. A special premiere was held at the westernmost point in Europe on Cape Rock. Following Portugal in early 2017, the story of Grey the wolf was seen by residents of three Latin American countries (Colombia, Bolivia and Ecuador), and in spring and summer it was shown in Hungary, Germany and Denmark. Koch Media issued the film for home media in the nations of Germany, Austria, Switzerland, Liechtenstein, Luxembourg and South Tyrol. ADS Service released the film in Hungary. In 2017, in Greece, Wizart Animation films were seen for the first time as Spentzos Films agreed to distribute the film. KLB distributed in France. French TV channel Gulli featured the film. Eagle Entertainment closed deals for the film to be released in Australia and New Zealand in 2017.

Sheep & Wolves had a theatrical run in Norway via the company Storytelling Media and was the first Russian independent animated film to have a Norwegian theatrical release. Flame Node Entertainment and Alibaba Pictures Group released the film in theaters of China and BoXoo Entertainment released it in South Korea. According to producer Yuri Moskvin of Wizart Animation, the Chinese market is key for the rental of Sheep and Wolves, with the show expected to reach the widest audience. The film had a limited release in the United States on 9 March 2018 by Lionsgate. The film continued its run in new countries of UK, Channel Islands, Isle of Man, Falkland Islands, English-speaking Gibraltar, and Malta with DVD release set for 9 April 2018.

PRO FILMS released the film in Bulgaria. Company leader Emil Simeonov recalled the marketing campaign that took place in the nation for the film as "massive, we had four of the top 20 most popular singers and actors involved and we covered every channel I know, even a few communication channels I'd heard of for the first time." The film also played at the Cannes Film Festival, Annecy International Animated Film Festival, and the Oaxaca FilmFest. Gravel Road Distribution Group agreed to distribute the Sheep and Wolves series to Africa in 2020 during the Key Buyers Event.

== Reception ==
=== Box office ===
The animated film was one of the most anticipated premieres of Russian cinema in 2016. The film's budget was $3.4 million (~230 rubles). In Russia, with the film opening to 1,892 theaters in its first week, Sheep and Wolves debuted at number two, grossing 46,720,975 rubles and attracting more than 234,000 viewers. The film grossed a total of ₽143,789,109 throughout its entire 19-week Russian run. The film took the leading positions as one of the most successful Russian projects at the international box office in 2016. In Croatia, the film managed to take second place in premiere week after Bridget Jones 3. The film attained top three status in Bulgaria.

In Lithuania, the film made 1,449.39 euros on its first week and began at number 16 in the nation's box office. By the next week, the film topped the Lithuania box office and grossed 19,476,08 more euros. The film also ranked in the top ten of the box offices of other countries such as Poland, Romania, Slovenia, and Turkey. The film grossed a worldwide amount of $4.1 million (~301 million rubles) breaking even its production budget amount of 230 million rubles.

=== Critical response ===
Although it was met with warm reviews in Russia, critical reception for Sheep and Wolves elsewhere was generally negative, with critics panning its writing, pacing, characterization and lore. Russian-speaking critics note the cartoon has a straightforward, but clearly structured plot; a thorough study of the characters; and the comparative identity of the project. Boris Ivanov of Film.ru thought the picture was decent for Russian cinema, noting its graphics and animation, although there were some shortcomings in directing, expressed in a lack of dimensionality in the narrative. "A slightly understated, but mostly decent Russian comedy cartoon about a sloppy wolf who turned into a ram. The charming main character demonstrates mental immaturity, gets into a mess, experiences adventures, realizes his mistakes, shows heroism, demonstrates that he has corrected himself… And the reward is a well-deserved happy end. Nothing particularly new or unusual, but against the background of what some other Russian studios are doing, it's nice to see the work of professionals."

Susanna Alperina for Russian newspaper Rossiyskaya Gazeta says the film is "a well-constructed drama." In some segments the reviewer mistakes it for a foreign film which is a compliment, "And the most amazing and pleasant thing is that sometimes during viewing there is a feeling that the screen is not a domestic product at all, but a purchased one, only our stars are voicing it. And this is great!" Alexey Mazhaev notes that the cartoon is at the level of Western animation patterns, although the amount of adult humor and drama in the tape is less than in similar films by DreamWorks and Walt Disney Pictures. Mazhaev notes that the animals in the animated film are at a rather high civilized level, and the lack of elaboration by the scriptwriters of the crazy transformations from a wolf into a ram and vice versa "gives the plot a kind of absurd charm. Wolves and Sheep convincingly show the superiority of good over evil, without slipping into moralizing."

Dmitry Bortnikov gave the film eight out of ten stars stating the film is revolutionary: "In fact, it turned out that the cartoon is the best thing that has happened to our animation, short meter does not count, for the last twenty years." The critic commended the film's various media references such as Star Wars and The Lion King, as well as the apt voice cast. The review ended by stating,"So we are living in an exciting time, and it is possible that projects will be created right before our eyes that will change the industry and create something as strong and original as Soviet animation."

Many critics found the depth of the blue color in the film canvas to be exceptional. Caution Spoilers found the animation to be a plus point: "The animation is nothing exceptional, though it is an exceptionally pretty film (possibly too garish for some). The grass is very green, the sky is very blue, the flowers and butterflies every colour of the rainbow. Even the darker hues used when we visit the wolf pack in its stony camp have a richness, the blue-greys of the rocks muted but still with depth." Olesya Troshina claims that the animation of Wolves and Sheep is not bad, but not without flaws and roughness, and the drawing of animals in the tape, although it does not reach the level of Zootopia, is attentive to details. The review stated landscapes, however, are colorful and look good especially because of its blue canvas: "To this you can add colorful landscapes consisting of lilac, blue, and other beautiful shades that look very decent...And throughout the cartoon, you can feel the originality, reverent attitude, and painstaking work of its creators."

Another review from Кino Mail (ru) also commended the film's animated blue sky, "What interiors and landscapes, water streams and trees, clouds of fog, and magic smoke filling the wagon of the Gypsy rabbit Mami! What a sky, and finally, wool on the main characters." Kirill Ilyukhin also believes the plot of the film is not original, but amusing and interesting to the main target audience – children. Scoring the film a seven out of ten, the review compared the movie to Kung Fu Panda (2008). The reviewer stated, "They really got a cartoon, which has its own zest." The critic said the children would enjoy its humor and story and the adults its references to other films. Olivier Bachelard, writing for the French source Abus de Cine, praised the film's visuals, highlighting its "fluid" animation and "impressive" use of colors, and wrote that young viewers would enjoy the story. However, he also disliked its "useless" scenes, "somewhat disappointing" characters, and the character designs, describing them as "dressed in grotesque hairstyles."

=== Awards and nominations ===
Award	Category	Recipient(s)	Result	Ref(s)
Zlin Film Festival (Czech Republic)	Panorama	Sheep and Wolves	Nominated	
Annecy International Animation Film Festival	Full-Length Film	Sheep and Wolves	Nominated	
Jerry Goldsmith Awards	Best Score for a Feature Film	Alexander Lessertissier	Nominated	
Guro International Kids Film Festival	Grand Prix	Yuri Moskvin	Won	
Catalina Film Festival	Best Feature Film	Sheep and Wolves	Won	
Meraki International Film Fest (Spain)	Best Feature Film	Sheep and Wolves	Semi-finalist	
Asia Pacific Screen Awards (APSA)	Animated Feature Film	Yuri Moskvin; Sergey Selyanov; Vladimir Nikolaev	Nominated	
Golden Unicorn Award	Animated Film	Sheep and Wolves	Won	
Golden Eagle	Animated Film	Maksim Volkov	Nominated	
Suzdalfest	Diploma in the category Best Feature Film	Maksim Volkov	Won	
Golden Elephant (ICFF-Lucknow)	Outstanding Achievement Award	Maksim Volkov	Won	
Icarus	Best Cartoons at the Box Office	Maksim Volkov; Sergey Selyanov; Vladimir Nikolaev; Yuri Moskvin	Nominated	
Vienna Independent Film Festival	Animated Film	Andrey Galat (director); Maksim Volkov (director); Wizart Animation; CTB Film Company	Nominated	
Marbella International Film Festival	Animation, Feature	Maksim Volkov	Nominated	
International Animated Film Festival WFAF (Varna-2018)	Animated Feature Films	Sheep and Wolves	Nominated	

== Sequel ==
Sheep and Wolves in its global coverage has managed to be released in more than forty countries. In an April 2016 interview, Yuri Moskvin revealed that the company began a script for a sequel of the film planned for release in 2018. It will be produced by the same team as the first film and is expected to come out in the spring of 2018.

The sequel Sheep and Wolves: Pig Deal was released in Russia in January 2019. Vertical Entertainment picked up the sequel for distribution in North America on 29 January 2021.
