= Sheep and Wolves: Pig Deal =

2019 Russian animated fantasy-comedy film

- Theatrical release poster
- Directed by: Vladimir Nikolaev; Mikhail Babenko
- Written by: Anton Timofeev; Vladimir Nikolaev; Aleksey Tsitsilin; Robert Lence; Mikhail Babenko
- Story by: Aleksey Tsitsilin; Vladimir Nikolaev
- Based on: Characters by Maxim Volkov
- Produced by: Yuri Moskvin; Vladimir Nikolayev (director); Sergey Selyanov
- Starring: Maxim Matveev (en); Elizaveta Boyarskaya; Galina Korneva; Anton Yuriev; Alexey Sigaev; Mikhail Belyakovich; Nikita Prozorovsky; Daniel Eldarov; Mikhail Tikhonov; English; Graham Halstead; Kate Bristol; Melissa Hope; Vanessa Gardner; Billy Bob Thompson; Major Attaway; Tyler Bunch; Oliver Wyman; Jason Griffith
- Music by: Benjamin Zecker
- Production companies: Wizart Animation; CTB Film Company
- Distributed by: Nashe Kino
- Release date: 24 January 2019 (Russia)
- Running time: 74 minutes
- Country: Russia
- Languages: Russian; English
- Budget: ₽350 million ~$4.7 million
- Box office: $3.5 million

Sheep and Wolves: Pig Deal (Russian: Волки и овцы: Ход свиньей, romanized: Volki i ovcy: Hod sviney, lit. 'Wolves and Sheep: A Pig's Move') is a 2019 Russian 3D animated fantasy-comedy film. It is a sequel to the 2016 film Sheep and Wolves and contains elements of the fairy tale The Wolf and the Seven Young Kids. Wizart Animation and CTB Film Company were joint animation production studios for the film and it was produced by Sergey Selyanov, Yuri Moskvin, Vladimir Nikolaev and directed by Vladimir Nikolaev and Mikhail Babenko.

The original Russian version of the film features Maxim Matveev as the voice of Grey and also includes the voice talents of Elizaveta Boyarskaya, Galina Korneva, Anton Yuriev, Alexey Sigaev, Mikhail Belyakovich, Nikita Prozorovsky, Daniel Eldarov and Mikhail Tikhonov. The international versions stars Graham Halstead as Grey and also features Kate Bristol, Vanessa Gardner, Melissa Hope, Billy Bob Thompson, Major Attaway, Tyler Bunch, Oliver Wyman and Jason Griffith.

The plot revolves around Grey, the peaceful wolf, who leads a grassy utopia village where wolves and sheep live in harmony. Unexpected guests appear – an arctic vixen Simone and sheep girl Josie who are saved from the Dark Wolves. The wolves appetite for the newcomers prompts them to attack the village and demand Grey to extradite them. Instead of satiating their appetite, Grey raises the walls as pacifists are ready to defend the village against war marauders. The film premiered on January 24, 2019 followed by a global release. The movie released in the UK on August 10, 2020 and in the USA on January 29, 2021.

The movie was nominated for several awards, including the Pulcinella Award at Cartoons on the Bay in Italy and won the award for Best Storyline at the Catalina Film Festival. Like its predecessor, the film received generally negative reviews from critics outside of Russia, who felt that the film is "more of a carbon-copy" of the original.

== Plot ==
At a dark grotto, an emissary wolf meets Gark, the leader of a warring wolf clan, the Dark Wolves sitting atop his walrus throne. The emissary reports the rumors that Mami, the gypsy is selling souvenirs. However, she is close to the harmonious village where sheep and wolves live in peace. Gark and the pack agree to capture this new animal that suddenly appeared to them in the food chain. They succeed in capturing Mami. Back at the egalitarian society of wolves and sheep, Belgour names Grey the new successor.

The wolf Grey becomes the unanimous leader. During those times unexpected guests arrive: a small ewe named Josie (who was originally a crocodile until she accidentally drank Mami's potion) with a polar vixen named Simone who sought refuge from the predator wolves. Grey welcomes them with open arms despite peremptory suspicions from Ziko the ram. The wolf clan learns of this news and attacks the village to extradite the new animals for feasting. However they avoid an all out war because they know Grey the wolf will overcome his identity crisis and be a wolf again. Then they can easily handle the sheep village. Gark defeats Grey. He leaves with a declaration, "Your alliance with sheep is disgusting." Grey has three days before they overrun their village to feast on everyone and make the sacred pact between vegetarians and carnivores void.

Grey returns to the village and declares the threatening news. The villagers agree to defend their rights and rally for a noble cause. They build a fortress for the upcoming clash with the hungry wolves. However, a mysterious saboteur with white gloves is active. The architects learn the saboteur inserted weak drawings to the architectural plan causing the fortress to crumble. Grey, discouraged and full of self-doubt, seeks Belgour's advice again. Belgour is still calm and repeats that his faith in the new leader is unbreakable. He says that Grey has already managed to transform the sheep herd into one accord and that means there is nothing he can not do. Belgour leaves with sage advise, "Any chaos can be turned into something beautiful."

Grey realizes the concept of transformation reminds him of Gypsi Mami. However she is held captive at Gark's ravine. Grey and Bianca set out to free Mami. As a courtesy, Mami cooks a magic potion that was first tested on little Josie. The experiment turned Josie into an indomitable high-power sheep. The clan agrees the potion will turn the tides of the war. The potion is kept in a shed while the day of the siege arrives. Unknown to the sheep, the saboteur replaces the vial with a counterfeit one.

At the battle, a rally is held as the Dark Wolves lay siege to the city. Then the soldiers including Cliff the Seagull and Ziko the ram drink the potion, suddenly turning them into helpless and defenseless pigs, including Bianca, Simone and Humbler (Skinny's friend). Gark and the Dark Wolves who are amused, drive the pigs into the main village square as they defeat Grey. Skinny reveals he is the true saboteur who never wanted an alliance between the sheep and wolves. Gark, disgusted by the betrayals, puts both Skinny and Grey inside Belgour's shed. There, Skinny realizes his actions contributed to this whole predicament and Grey was in fact the true leader. Grey becomes heroic as Little Josie breaks down the door because she still has the power of strength from the potion. A diversionary plot is created as Little Josie will distract the wolves while Grey isolates Gark in a fight. Skinny manages to get the transmutation potion that turns the piglets back to their former and normal selves.

The wolves and the sheep were ready to commit war against the Dark Wolves. However, Gypsi Mami and Simone reconcile their differences by telling the two fronts that they are similar to each other in hobbies. The two warring clans agree for peace. Meanwhile, the main fight between Gark and Grey commences. Grey manages to win but Gark parries back with a treacherous back hand attack. The warring clans rush to the aid of Grey. Gark, although outnumbered, goes to the shed to drink the potion of strength. The sheep and wolves watch as the shed collapses as the imminent rise of Gark with super strength emerges. However, the clan realizes Gark was only transformed into a pig and they laugh at him as Gark finally accepts defeat. Festivities break out as Grey and Bianca have a son named Duke, Simone finally achieves her dream to become a botanist, and Mami agrees to keep Gark's form for the time being until he re-educates himself. Meanwhile, while watching the view on a hill with Ike, Little Josie begins to transform back into a crocodile.

== Cast ==
Character	Russian Actor	English Actor
Grey	Maxim Matveev	Graham Halstead
Bianca	Elizaveta Boyarskaya	Kate Bristol
Simone	Galina Korneva	Melissa Hope
Mami	Galina Korneva	Vanessa Gardner
Ziko	Anton Yuriev	Billy Bob Thompson
Gark	Mikhail Belyakovich	Major Attaway
Belgour	Nikita Prozorovsky	Tyler Bunch
Moz	Daniel Eldarov	Oliver Wyman
Skinny	Mikhail Tikhonov	Jason Griffith
Chuk	Alexey Sigaev	Tom Wayland
Cliff		Sean Schemmel

== Production ==
=== Development ===
The original film Sheep and Wolves became a series as the creators of the film decided to continue the adventures of the eponymous character Grey. During April 2016, Yuri Moskvin revealed the studio was working on a sequel with an anticipated release date on 2018. Sergey Selyanov, Yuri Moskin and Vladimir Nikolaev joined to produce the film.

Production studios Wizart Animation and CTB Film Company united from its prequel as joint production studios. The film was the directorial debut of Vladimir Nikolaev who has been general producer for many of Wizart Animation films. The head of the project was Mikhail Babenko. Robert Lence and Aleksey Tsitsilin collaborated with writing the script whose foundation has elements from wolf in sheep's clothing.

The writers wrote the children's tale around the theme of egalitarian society. The film's main idea is the uncanny animal friendship between the predator wolves and the herbivore sheep. The film also explores the themes associated with Grey's character development from a nascent leader of an animal society to a hero who must overcome his blunder by deciding whether to cave into his primal instincts as a wolf or help the sheep, evoking the idiom of fish out of water. The scriptwriters described the conflict that arises when new characters are introduced to the movie including the fox Simone and gypsy Mami. The conflict depicted a war between pacificts and militarists. Another aspect that the writers wanted to convey was peace represented by the character Belgour the elder leader. A review noted Belgour's ascetic, peaceful characteristics is a caricature to the many practitioners of nonresistance such as Leo Tolstoy.

The clash of diametrically opposite clans was noted by a review from Germany as a take on the French comic book series Asterix, where the Gauls attack the Romans. Many central themes are explored in this war such as the progress of civilization threatened by an outside force that is spurred by will to power. Rising tensions inside the village are also explored to depict how a utopian civilization will react in committing condemnation or preserve the founding ideals of democracy.

An acclaimed cast was announced for the original Russian film including Maxim Matveev who voiced Grey and Elizaveta Boyarskaya who voiced Bianca. The voices of the hosts of the radio show Russian Pepper, Galina Korneva voiced the polar fox Simona and the hare Mami, Anton Yuriev voiced the ram Ziko and Alexey Sigaev voiced the wolf Chuk.

For the international version, Graham Halstead voiced Grey, Kate Bristol voiced Bianca, Melissa Hope voiced Simone, Vanessa Gardner voiced Mami, Billy Bob Thompson voiced Ziko, Major Attaway voiced Gark, Tyler Bunch voiced Belgour, Oliver Wyman voiced Moz and Jason Griffith voiced Skinny. At the Berlinale during Feb 2018, Wizart Animation revealed the first poster of the film. The film also attended the March 2018 FILMART Asian film market in Hong Kong.

Komsomolskaya Pravda newspaper put the film in the list of the most anticipated premieres to watch with children in 2019. Wizart Animation revealed the official opening date for Sheep and Wolves: Pig Deal to be 24 January 2019 with European release later in spring. At the 43rd Toronto International Film Festival, the film was presented to viewers. During October 2018 at the American Film Market, several distributors showed interest for the film. Deals were signed for distribution that included ADS Service Ltd in Hungary, KLB SAS in France for TV release and Bohemia Motion Pictures for the Czech Republic and Slovakia. Koch Media also acquired the film for release in Germany. Rai Gulp, Italy's largest children's TV channel, acquired the rights to televise the Wolves and Sheep series.

In 2020, Russia held its own film festival called Key Buyers Event: Digital Edition. During the virtual content market, distributors from UK, India and Africa appraised the Wolves and Sheep series. The film distributors such as Signature Entertainment, one of Britain's leading distributors, agreed to release the film to cinemas on 10 August 2020 with later home media available in November. Gravel Road Distribution Group agreed to distribute the Sheep and Wolves series to Africa.

=== Animation ===
The sequel featured improved aesthetics in naturally depicting grass and its reflection properties when the sun shines. Animators added new animals to the Sheep and Wolves animal universe including hares, polar foxes and crocodiles including the curly-haired fashionista sheep Marlene. The animators studied raccoon and bird anatomy to draw some of the characters. Sheep and wolves were purposeful drawn to represent the mannerisms of people. The characters deliberately look very "humanized", especially the faces – namely the faces, not the muzzles.

=== Soundtrack ===
Sheep and Wolves: Pig Deal

Soundtrack album by Benjamin Zecker
- Released: October 4, 2019
- Genres: Original Motion Picture Soundtrack pop electropop funk rock eurodance
- Length: 57:03
- Label: Redrocca

Benjamin Zecker composed the original score for the movie. Zecker with credits including Nomad of Nowhere, Camp Camp (TV series, 2016) has twenty nine tracks for the movie. The review from rateyourmusic had a rating of three and a half stars. Singer of musicals, Yulia Iva sang the theme song. Other artists include Morandi, Chromeo, Dry Spells, Fibes, Oh Fibes!, etc.

Track listing
No.	Title	Singer(s)	Length
28.	"The Sheep & Wolves Village"		1:39
29.	"Better Together"	Krysta Youngs; Julia Ross	3:11
30.	"Kalinka"	Morandi	3:47
31.	"Bad Decision"	Chromeo	3:08
32.	"Happy People"	Dry Spells	3:35
33.	"Love Child"	Fibes, Oh Fibes!	3:17
34.	"Euphoria"	Loreen	3:33
35.	"Nothin' on You"	B.o.B featuring Bruno Mars	4:29

== Release ==
=== Theatrical ===
A pre-premiere was held at the Karo Sky cinema in Moscow, presented by cinematic duo Elizaveta Boyarskaya and Maxim Matveev. On 19 January 2019, the premiere took place in Moscow and on 22 January 2019 at the capital of the Chernozem region in the Proletarian cinema theater. The film debuted in Russia on 24 January 2019. Before, there was a pre-release in Bulgaria on 3 January 2019 via Pro Films. Distributed by Nashe Kino in Russia, the film also had parallel releases in Czech Republic (Bohemia Motion Pictures) and Estonia (Acme Film (lt)). Later 2019 releases included Latvia (Acme Film) in 1 March, Hungary(ADS Service) in 7 March, and Norway (Storytelling Media) in 31 May.

The film was featured in Turkey on 22 March 2019. June 2019 releases included France (KLB SAS) in 4 June as a DVD and Blu-ray premiere, Lithuania (Acme Film (lt)) in 14 June, Germany (Koch Media) in 27 June. The film released in Poland on 2 August 2019 via Kino Świat (pl). Andes Films took the distribution rights at the AFM for four Latin American countries Chile, Bolivia, Peru and Ecuador for a late 2019 release. Latin American territories were handled by Snap TV. The film released in Bosnia and Herzegovina, Croatia, Macedonia, Montenegro and Serbia through the distributor MCF MegaCom. The film opened in Australia and New Zealand in January 2020 via Eagle Entertainment. Signature Entertainment released the film on 10 August 2020 in the United Kingdom. On 25 July 2020 at the Shanghai International Film Festival the film was presented to China. On 18 September 2020, the film won an accolade at the Catalina Film Festival. In 2021, Vertical Entertainment picked up the latest film for release on 29 January 2021. Touted as a hybrid release of theater and VOD format, the film will also be packaged to the neighboring country Canada.

== Reception ==
=== Box office ===
The budget of the film was around ₽3.5 million rubles (~$4.5 million USD). First Russian premiere weekend saw the film at the ninth place in the box office. In the second week, the film attained fourth place at the Russian box office. In total in Russia, collections amounted to $2.4 million. Wolves and Sheep: Pig Deal continued its prequel's performance in Bulgaria as it set records in the country. The film attained top second place at the box office for the first weekend collecting 72.5 thousand dollars and was down only by Star Wars: The Rise of Skywalker. Current total international box office is $3.5 million.

=== Critical response ===
Like the first film, Sheep and Wolves: Pig Deal also received negative reviews outside of its home country. Russian-speaking critics such as InterMedia stated the film is a good post-festival entertainer with the voice cast performance for the characters Grey and Bianca voiced by Maxim Matveev and Elizaveta Boyarskaya respectively, specially noted for its well convincing emotional expressions. Ovideo stated the motley of characters in the film and how they play a role in the war is commendable. The review's conclusion stated: "Character design remains the main trump card of the studio; detailed drawing and smooth animation do not cause complaints, and the creators managed to refrain from using resource-intensive effects this time. In general, it turned out to be an uncomplicated, but very cute product that can captivate the widest audience with a funny and bright variation on the immortal theme of universal equality and fraternity."

Oliver Armknecht writing for Film-rezensionen gave the film Völlig von der Wolle: Schwein gehabt (German title) five stars out of ten stars who noted the sequel was slightly better than the original film: "The landscapes are very colorful, especially very green. However, both the objects and the figures are modeled rather sparingly, the effects are manageable, even with the topic. The story basically picks up on the conflict of its predecessor: sheep and wolves live together – the English title of the series is also Sheep and Wolves – but some wolves want to change that. This time it's wolves from abroad who want to put an end to it, which gives the film a bit of Asterix. Only that here there are no Gauls who fight against Romans, but sheep or pigs against wolves. Overall, Schwein was a little better than the predecessor."

Greek review from Movies LTD stated: "The design is decent (do not forget that we are not talking about Pixar or Disney); the pace is fast; the messages are simple. And while in the first film the main message was peaceful coexistence, in this film it is exactly what is mentioned in the "case": power in unity. This is very important for the times we live in. Gray is not exactly a born leader. He makes one blunder after another. At some point he doubts who he is and what he does. He also plays a Trojan horse (as I tell you!). The evil wolves come to break the harmonious coexistence, but in the end the good will prevail. The children will enjoy it. For parents an hour and a half will pass! It is enough to get good popcorn..."

French review from Focus on Animation stated the movie is suitable for a children's movie delving also into both its script and animation. The review stated the script could be perfected: "What a pity that the screenwriters did not choose to deepen the psychology of the characters already known to build with intelligence yet have a charming comment on free will." In terms of animation, the twilight scenes were better developed that has great potential to be reused in future projects: "At night, the muted atmospheres make the viewing more pleasant: one thinks in particular of the care taken at the camp of the pack of Shadows. By opting for the nuance, the animators tap into this potential for future productions."

In the UK, the mainstream review from The Guardian gave a negative review stating the "animated fable is shorn of excitement." However reviews from other sources were generally positive. Film review by Chris Hunneysett states, "The punning title of this animated fairy tale is a very effective guide to the bright, busy, brief and fairly basic paw-powered fun on offer. The filmmakers haven’t broken the piggy bank on the woolly minded script, which despite the ramshackle plotting will make ewe laugh every now and again, and the relentless piggery-jokery may amuse any easily distracted kids." Podcast review at Phoenix 98 FM by Stewart Pink applauded the film's surprising magnitude of ideas without having a rushed feeling. Furthermore, the review found the animated animal film is an innovative take in the animation industry worthy enough for viewing and should be placed among the standard fare of animated films that are presented today. Catalina Film Festival review by R.C. Samo denoted the film's message was to "seek to live harmoniously as a society and that the strong need to protect the weak." Moviesreview101 rated the movie on many fronts. The comedy is mostly slapstick, with the animation described as, "the animation does look good through the film, giving us the colourful designs for each of the animals." The final verdict for the film was: "Fun for the Kids."

=== Accolades ===
Award	Category	Recipient(s)	Result	Ref(s)
Golden Unicorn Award	Animated Film	Sheep and Wolves: Pig Deal	Nominated	
Cartoons on the Bay-Pulcinella Awards (Italy)	Best Animated Feature Film	Sheep and Wolves: Pig Deal	Nominated	
Icarus	Full-Length Animated Film	Sheep and Wolves: Pig Deal	Nominated	
Suzdalfest	Feature Film	Sheep and Wolves: Pig Deal	Nominated	
Good of the World Award	Animation	Sheep and Wolves: Pig Deal	Nominated	
Catalina Film Festival	Best Storyline	Sheep and Wolves: Pig Deal	Won	
International Film Festival for Children and Youth (Krasnoyarsk)	Full-Length Animated Film	Sheep and Wolves: Pig Deal	Nominated	

== See also ==
- List of 2019 animated feature-length films
