= Ekaterina Ivanchikova =

Ekaterina Ivanchikova Кацярына Іванчыкава
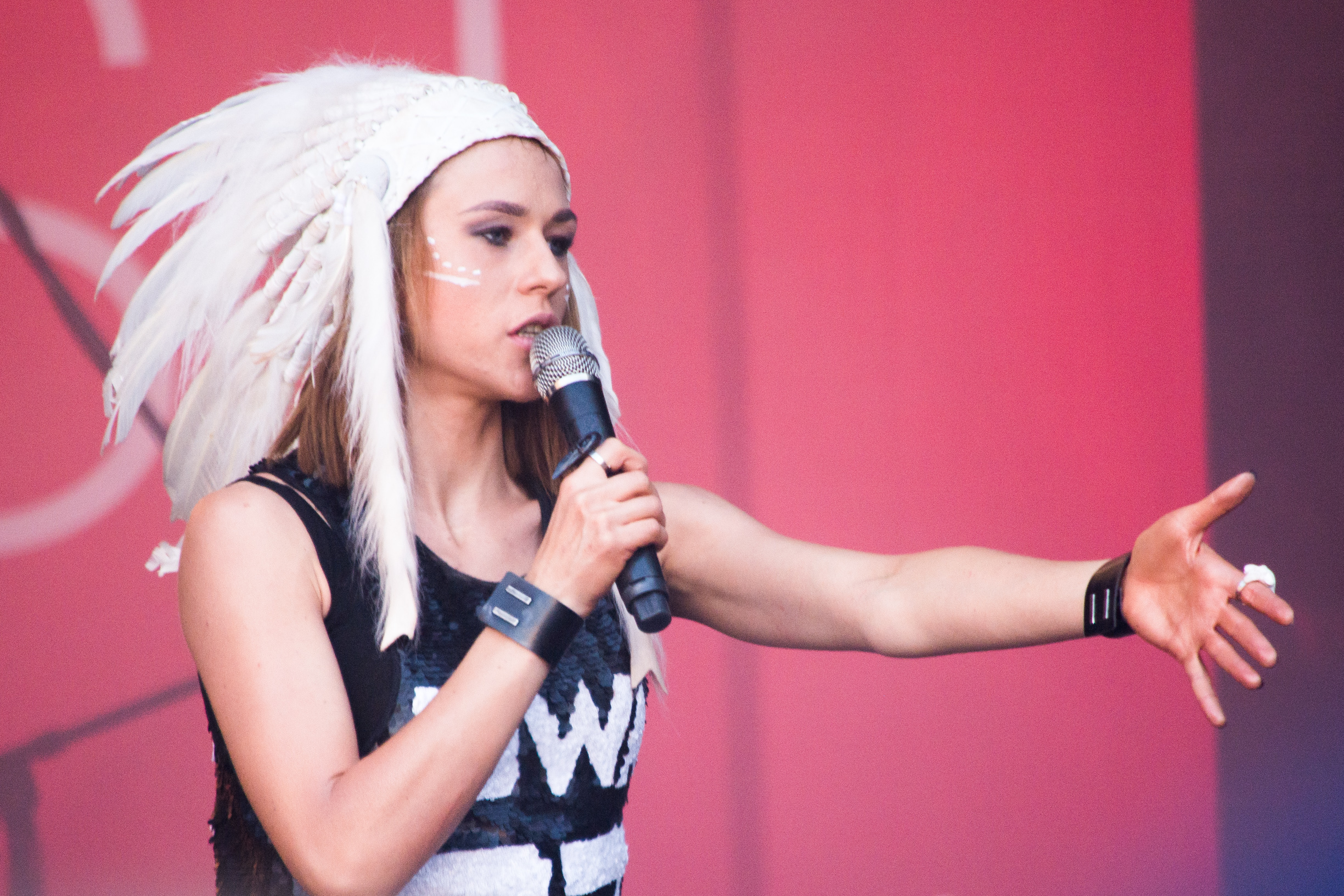

Background information
- Also known as: Катя Иванчикова
- Born: 18 August 1987 (age 39); Chavusy, Belarusian SSR
- Genres: Alternative rock, pop, Indie rock
- Occupations: Singer, Songwriter in IOWA band
- Instruments: Vocals, piano
- Years active: 2009–present
- Website: iowamusic.ru iowaband.ru

Ekaterina Leonidovna Ivanchikova (Katsiaryna Leanidawna Ivanchykava) (Russian: Екатерина Леонидовна Иванчикова; Belarusian: Кацярына Леанідаўна Іванчыкава/Kaćaryna Leanidaúna Ivančykava; born 18 August 1987) is a Belarusian singer and vocalist at Belarusian band IOWA currently based in Russia. She was born in Chavusy and is now living in Saint Petersburg.

== Career ==
Katya's first performance on stage was in 1992 at a regional competition among kindergarteners, where she was awarded first place by the jury. In school, she was engaged in various kinds of art, including painting, dance, music, piano, and singing. Throughout her adolescence, Ivanchikova wrote songs and developed ideas a music group. In 2005 she moved to Minsk to study linguistics and journalism at BSPU.

=== IOWA ===
IOWA was formed in 2009 in Mahilyow. In 2010, after a series of concerts in St. Petersburg, the group decided to move to St. Petersburg, where the band members live today.

=== Filmography ===
Year	Title	Role	Notes
2013	Metegol	Laura	Russian voice
2016	Sheep and Wolves	Lira	voice

== Personal life ==
12 October 2016 Ekaterina Ivanchikova married IOWA's guitarist Leonid Tereschenko, who she had been with for over 9 years. The wedding took place in Karelia.
