= Iowa (band) =

Belarusian music group currently based in Russia

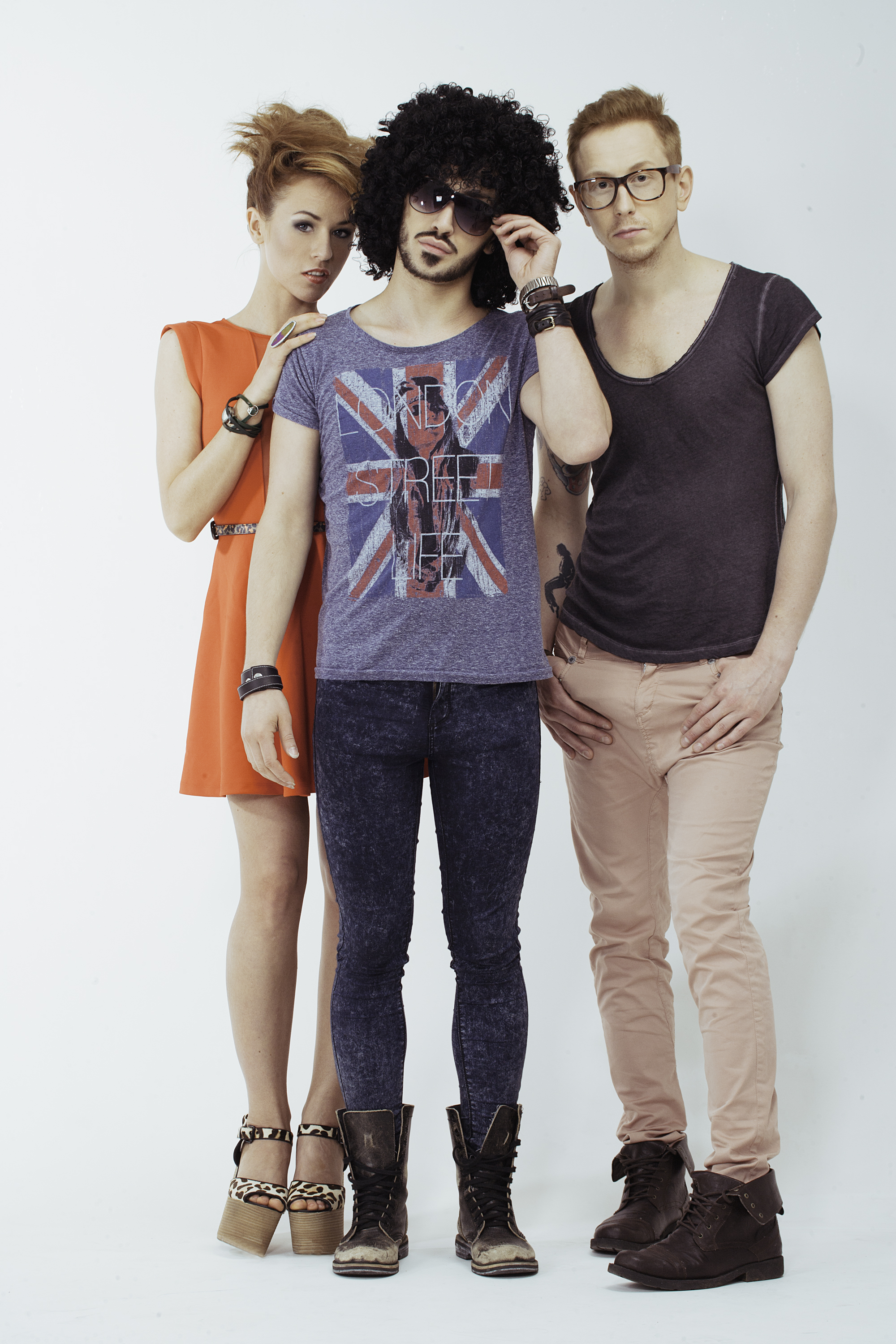

Background information
- Origin: Mahilyow, Belarus
- Genres: Pop rock; indie pop; electropop; alternative pop
- Years active: 2009 – present
- Labels: Streaming Club; Rhymes; 1MP
- Members: Ekaterina Ivanchikova; Leanid Tsiareshchenka; Vasil Bulanau
- Website: iowa-music.com

Iowa (Russian: Айова/Ajova, Belarusian: Аёва/Ajova), is a Belarusian pop rock trio currently based in Russia.

== History ==
Iowa is named after the album Iowa by the band Slipknot. In 2008, vocalist Ekaterina Ivanchikova sang in the musical The Prophet by Ilya Oleynikov. Iowa was formed in 2009 in Mahilyow. In 2010, after a series of concerts in St. Petersburg, the group decided to move to St. Petersburg, Russia where the band members live today.

== Discography ==
=== Studio albums ===
Year	Album title
2014	Export
2016	Import
2020	#ludimayaki
2023	Cassiopeia

=== Singles ===
Year	Original Title	Transliteration	Translation	Album
2011	Простая песня	Prostaya Pesnya	A Simple Song	Export
2012	Мама	Mama	Mom	Export
2012	Улыбайся	Ulybaysya	Smile!	Export
2012	Ищу мужа	Ischu Muzha	Looking for Husband	Export
2013	Невеста	Nevesta	Bride	Export
2014	Маршрутка	Marshrutka	Minibus	Export
2015	Одно и то же	Odno I To Zhe	The Same	Export
2015	Бьёт бит	Byot Bit	The Beat Is Rocking	Import
2016	Три дня холода	Tri Dnya Kholoda	Three Days of Cold	Import
2016	140	Sto Sorok	140	Import
2016	Мои стихи, твоя гитара	Moi Stikhi, Tvoya Gitara	My Poetry, Your Guitar	Import
2017	Я так люблю	Ya Tak Lyublyu	I Love So Much	Import
2017	Красота	Krasota	The Beauty	Non-album
2017	Плохо танцевать	Plokho Tantsevat'	Dancing Bad	Non-album
2018	Падай	Paday	Fall Down	Non-album
2018	Молчишь на меня	Molchish Na Menya	Silent on Me	Non-album
2018	Я заболела тобой	Ya Zabolela Toboy	I'm Sick with You	Non-album
2019	Пой	Poy	Sing	#ludimayaki
2019	Маяки	Mayaki	Lighthouses	#ludimayaki
2020	#душнодует	#dushnoduyet	#stuffyblowing	Non-album
2020	В танце	V Tantse	In Dance	Non-album
2020	Спайси	Spaysi	Spicy	Non-album
2021	Возьми на радость из моих ладоней	Voz'mi Na Radost' Iz Moikh Ladoney	Take Joy from My Hands	Non-album
2021	Зеленогласое такси (feat. RSAC)	Zelenoglazoye Taksi	Green-eyed Taxi	Non-album
2021	Весна (feat. Tareq)	Vesna	Spring	Non-album
2021	Бросай	Brosay	Hang Up	Non-album
2021	Яблоко (feat. Yolka)	Yabloko	Apple	Non-album
2021	Не понимаю (feat. TAYÖKA)	Ne Ponimayu	Don't Understand	Non-album
2021	Money Race			Non-album
2022	Пусть боль уйдёт (feat. Nila Mania)	Pust' Bol' Uydyot	May the Pain Go Away	Non-album
2022	Знаки	Znaki	Signs	Non-album
2022	Мотылёк (feat. Maybe Baby)	Motylyok	Moth	Non-album
2022	Свинка-копилка	Svinka-Kopilka	Piggy Bank	Non-album
2022	Пряталась в ванной (Mari Kraimbrery cover)	Pryatalas' v Vannoy	Hid in the Bathroom	Non-album
2022	Моя мама — супергерой (feat. Tsvetnyashki)	Moya Mama — Supergeroy	My Mom is a Superhero	Non-album
2023	Плохая погода	Plokhaya Pogoda	Bad Weather	Cassiopeia
2023	Зебра	Zebra	Zebra	Cassiopeia
2023	Парад планет	Parad Planet	Parade of Planets	Cassiopeia
2023	Фотография 9х12 (Irina Allegrova cover)	Fotografiya Devyat' Na Dvenadtsat'	9x12 Photo	Non-album
2024	Кусь	Kus'	Bitty	Non-album
2024	Кофевечеринка	Kofevecherinka	Coffeeparty	Non-album
2024	Снег идёт	Sneg Idyot	It's Snowing	Non-album

== Awards and nominations ==
2012

- New Wave: audience choice (won)

2013

- RU.TV Award: Best start of the year (nom)

2015

- Muz-TV Award: Best Song, Breakthrough (nom)
- RU.TV Award: Dolce Vita (nom)
- Golden Gramophone Award (won)
- Russian National Music Award: Best Song (nom), Best Pop Group (nom)

2016

- Muz-TV Award: Best Pop Band (nom)
- Russian National Music Award: Best Song (nom), Best Pop Group (nom)

2017

- Muz-TV Award: Best Pop Band (nom)
- Russian National Music Award: Best Pop Group (won)

2018

- Muz-TV Award: Best Pop Band (nom)
- Russian National Music Award: Best Pop Group (nom)

=== 2019 ===
- Russian National Music Award: Best Pop Group (nom)
