= Russian Film Week =

Russian film festival in London

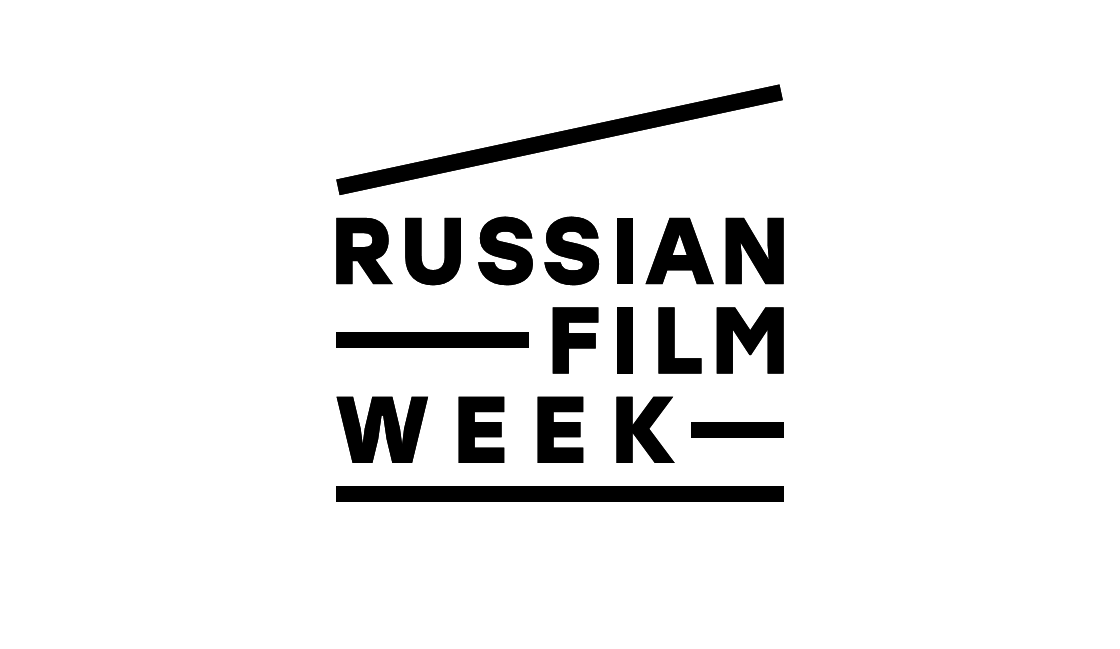
- Location: London, United Kingdom
- Founded: 2016
- Awards: Golden Unicorn Awards
- Language: Russian, English
- Website: www.russianfilmweek.org

Russian Film Week was an annual film festival in London that ran from 2016 until 2018 or 2019. The festival screened Russian and co-produced films and concluded with the Golden Unicorn Awards ceremony.

== History ==
Russian Film Week and the Golden Unicorn Awards were founded by Filip Perkon in 2016 in London, run by Perkon Productions Ltd with a group of volunteers on a non-profit basis. In 2017, the Russian Ministry of Culture, along with Synergy University (a private university in Moscow), and the British Film Institute began supporting the event. From 2017 the festival was supported by the Russian Ministry of Culture to promote Russian film to international audiences and build cultural links between Russia and the UK.

Synergy University was an official co-organiser of the awards.

Both Russian Film Week and the Golden Unicorn Awards appear to have been "cancelled until further notice" since 2018 or 2019.

== Description ==
The festival screens Russian and co-produced films and concludes with the Golden Unicorn Awards ceremony.

The inaugural Russian Film Week events were held at several venues across London and at Cambridge University.

The 2018 awards ceremony took place at the Sheraton Park Lane London.

== See also ==
- Golden Unicorn Awards
- Russian cinema
- Cinema of Russia
- Russia–United Kingdom relations
