= List of largest universities in Russia by enrollment =

The largest universities in Russia by the number of students is a list of the largest universities in Russia, ranked by the number of students enrolled in higher education programs.

According to the Monitoring Data of the Ministry of Science and Higher Education of the Russian Federation, in 2023, 1206 higher education organizations operated in Russia: 898 state and municipal universities and 308 private universities. There were 4,167,532 students enrolled in them in 2023.

In 2023, 1,764,734 students studied at one hundred of the largest universities in the Russian Federation. From 28,000 to 43,000 students study in the Top-10 largest universities in Russia

More than 30 thousand students study at six universities. In the 1st place - Moscow Financial and Industrial University «Synergy» (43222 students), in the 2nd - M. V. Lomonosov Moscow State University (39282 students), the 3d place is occupied by Ural Federal University named after the first President of Russia B.N. Yeltsin (38797 students). The 4th place is taken by National Research University Higher School of Economics (38,757 students), the 5th place is taken by Kazan (Volga region) Federal University (38,653 students), the 6th place is taken by Patrice Lumumba Peoples' Friendship University of Russia (31,759 students). The rest of the universities, which were among the Top 100 largest in terms of the number of students in 2023, number from 10,000 to 30,000 students.

== Top 100 largest universities in Russia ==
1. Moscow Financial and Industrial University «Synergy» — 43,222 students.

2. M. V. Lomonosov Moscow State University — 39,282 students.

3. Ural Federal University named after the first President of Russia B.N. Yeltsin — 38,797 students.

4. National Research University Higher School of Economics — 38,757 students.

5. Kazan (Volga region) Federal University — 38,653 students.

6. Patrice Lumumba Peoples' Friendship University of Russia — 31,759 students.

7. Russian University of Transport — 29,643 students.

8. Peter the Great St. Petersburg Polytechnic University — 29,128 students.

9. Don State Technical University — 28,916 students.

10. Russian Presidential Academy of National Economy and Public Administration — 28,516 students.

11. MIREA - Russian University of Technology — 27 838 students.

12. Ufa University of Science and Technology — 26 919 students.

13. Siberian Federal University — 25,208 students.

14. Southern Federal University — 24,762 students.

15. Moscow International University — 24,319 students.

16. Financial University under the Government of the Russian Federation — 24,290 students.

17. Kuban State University — 23,561 students.

18. St. Petersburg State University — 23,378 students.

19. Bauman Moscow State Technical University — 23 150 students.

20. Moscow Pedagogical State University — 21,627 students.

21. V.I.Vernadsky Crimean Federal University — 20,536 students.

22. Tolyatti State University — 20,202 students.

23. National Research Nizhny Novgorod State University named after N.I. Lobachevsky — 20,096 students.

24. Moscow University of Finance and Law MFUA — 20,031 students.

25. South Ural State University (National Research University) — 19,644 students.

26. Far Eastern Federal University — 19,383 students.

27. A. I. Herzen Russian State Pedagogical University — 19,360 students.

28. Belgorod State National Research University — 19,188 students.

29. Tula State University — 18,895 students.

30. Plekhanov Russian University of Economics — 18,655 students.

31. National Research University "MEI" — 18,619 students.

32. I.N. Ulyanov Chuvash State University — 18,578 students.

33. I.M. Sechenov First Moscow State Medical University — 18,125 students.

34. Voronezh State University — 18,033 students.

35. Tyumen Industrial University — 17,496 students.

36. Penza State University — 17,450 students.

37. North Caucasus Federal University — 17,418 students.

38. St. Petersburg State University of Industrial Technologies and Design — 17,168 students.

39. Moscow Aviation Institute (National Research University) — 17,117 students.

40. Saratov National Research State University named after N.G. Chernyshevsky — 16,774 students.

41. Samara State Technical University — 16,579 students.

42. Kazan National Research Technological University — 16,493 students.

43. Samara National Research University named after academician S.P. Korolev — 16,243 students.

44. Russian State University for the Humanities — 16,163 students.

45. Ufa State Petroleum Technical University — 16,122 students.

46. Tyumen State University — 15,749 students.

47. Kadyrov Chechen State University — 15,730 students.

48. Voronezh State Technical University — 15,574 students.

49. Novosibirsk State Technical University — 15,491 students.

50. Vyatka State University — 15,429 students.

51. ITMO University — 15 219 students.

52. Kuban State Agrarian University named after I.T. Trubilin — 15,122 students.

53. Udmurt State University — 15 102 students.

54. Irkutsk National Research Technical University — 14,994 students.

55. S.Y. Witte Moscow University — 14,977 students.

56. Irkutsk State University — 14,910 students.

57. Northeastern Federal University named after M.K. Ammosov — 14,885 students.

58. Moscow City Pedagogical University — 14,593 students.

59. National Research Mordovian State University named after N.P.Ogarev — 14,591 students.

60. Altai State University — 14,470 students.

61. National Research Tomsk State University — 14,460 students.

62. Omsk State Technical University — 14,367 students.

63. Tomsk State University of Control Systems and Radioelectronics — 14,330 students.

64. Vladimir State University named after the Stoletovs — 14,256 students.

65. Siberian State University of Science and Technology named after Academician M.F. Reshetnev — 13,937 students.

66. Oryol State University named after I.S.Turgenev — 13,855 students.

67. Russian State Agrarian University – Moscow Timiryazev Agricultural Academy — 13 698 students.

68. Perm National Research Polytechnic University — 13,621 students.

69. Novosibirsk State Pedagogical University — 13,224 students.

70. Volgograd State Technical University — 13,125 students.

71. Perm State National Research University — 13,032 students.

72. Orenburg State University — 12,955 students.

73. Tambov State University named after G.R. Derzhavin — 12,912 students.

74. Kemerovo State University — 12,706 students.

75. Moscow State University of Civil Engineering — 12 683 students.

76. Moscow Polytechnic University — 12,599 students.

77. Chelyabinsk State University — 12,535 students.

78. St. Petersburg State University of Aerospace Instrumentation — 12,316 students.

79. Voronezh State Agrarian University named after Emperor Peter I — 12,284 students.

80. Kabardino-Balkarian State University named after H.M. Berbekov — 12,255 students.

81. Russian State Social University — 12,070 students.

82. Zabaikalsky State University — 11,966 students.

83. St. Petersburg State University of Economics — 11,935 students.

84. St. Petersburg State University of Architecture and Civil Engineering - 11,881 students.

85. Saratov State Law Academy — 11,840 students.

86. St. Petersburg State University of Railways of Emperor Alexander I — 11,837 students.

87. Belgorod State Technological University named after V.G. Shukhov — 11,819 students.

88. South Ural State University of Humanities and Pedagogy - 11,726 students.

89. Saratov State Technical University named after Yuri Gagarin — 11,620 students.

90. National Research Tomsk Polytechnic University — 11,553 students.

91. State University of Education — 11,198 students.

92. Moscow State Law University named after O.E. Kutafin (MGUA) — 11,096 students.

93. Northwestern Institute of Management - branch of RANEPA under the President of the Russian Federation — 11 083 students.

94. Southwestern State University — 10,920 students.

95. Rostov State University of Economics — 10,814 students.

96. Sevastopol State University — 10,790 students.

97. Dagestan State University — 10,700 students.

98. Magnitogorsk State Technical University named after G.I. Nosov — 10,695 students.

99. Ulyanovsk State University — 10,622 students.

100. Pacific State University — 10,490 students.
