= Kate Bristol =

American actress (born 1990)

- Born: May 1, 1990 (age 36); Dallas, Texas, U.S.
- Education: Pace University
- Occupation: Actress
- Years active: 2002–present
- Spouse: Winston Nget (m. 2016)
- Children: 1
- Website: www.katebristol.net

Kate Bristol (born May 1, 1990) is an American actress.

== Biography ==
Bristol began voice acting at the age of 11. Her debut show was Fruits Basket and she played the role of Kisa Sohma. Since then, Bristol has been in many more productions from Funimation including Strike Witches, Dragon Ball GT and Negima. In 2008, Bristol moved to New York City to pursue a stage career. She attended college at Pace University. Bristol has since appeared in the National Tour of the Wizard of Oz and provided the voice of many characters in several episodes of the Pokémon anime, such as Laverre City gym leader Valerie, among many other roles.

== Personal life ==
Bristol married Winston Nget on October 15, 2016. She announced her pregnancy on December 21, 2017. The couple has one daughter, Amelia Nget, who was born on June 24, 2018. One month later, they all moved back to the Dallas–Fort Worth metroplex.

== Filmography ==
=== Anime ===
List of voice performances in anime
Year	Series	Role	Notes	Source
2002	Fruits Basket	Kisa Sohma, Yuki Sohma (young)	Debut roles	Resume
2003	Dragon Ball Z	Pan	Funimation dub	Resume
2003	Dragon Ball GT	Child Pan	Funimation dub	
2005	Suzuka	Miho Fujikawa	also Fuka	
2006–07	Negima! series	Sayo Aisaka, Anya		
2007–08	Tai Chi Chasers	Phoebe (English; Reboot)		
2009	Strike Witches	Lynette Bishop		
2010	My Bride Is a Mermaid	Class Rep		
2011	Sekirei	Kuno		
2012	Future Diary	Tsubaki Kasugano (6th)		
2013	Pokémon XY	Jessica, Princess Allie, Nurse Joy and Valerie		
2015	Yu-Gi-Oh! Arc-V	Julia Krystal		
2016–18	Pokémon Sun & Moon	Sarah, Sophocles's Togedemaru		
2018	The Master of Ragnarok & Blesser of Einherjar	Christina		
2019–21	Fruits Basket	Kisa Sohma	2019 reboot	
2019–21	Black Clover	Letoile Becquerel		
2019	Hensuki: Are You Willing to Fall in Love with a Pervert, as Long as She's a Cutie?	Koharu Otori		
2019	How Heavy Are the Dumbbells You Lift?	Receptionist		
2019–present	Arifureta: From Commonplace to World's Strongest	Shizuku Yaegashi		
2020	Grisaia: Phantom Trigger	Shiori Arisaka		
2020	Super HxEros	Maihime Shirayuki		
2021	Full Dive	Kaede Yūki		
2021	Bottom-tier Character Tomozaki	Yuzu Izumi		
2021	Kageki Shojo!!	Asami Hamada		
2021	Deep Insanity: The Lost Child	Sumire		
2023	Am I Actually the Strongest?	Charlotte Zenfis		
2024	Re:Monster	Gobmi		
2024	Delico's Nursery	Kiki		
2025	Zenshu	Women		
2025	I May Be a Guild Receptionist, But I'll Solo Any Boss to Clock Out on Time	Lululee		
2025	Dekin no Mogura	Kyōko Nekozuku		
2025	Let This Grieving Soul Retire!	Sitri		
2026	The Villainess Is Adored by the Prince of the Neighbor Kingdom	Tiararose		

=== Animation ===
List of voice performances in animation
Year	Series	Role	Notes	Source
2011–22	Robocar Poli	Helly		Facebook
2013–14	The Crumpets	Caprice	Distribimage version	
2015–16	Winx Club	Musa, Shiny	Nickelodeon English version, season 7	Instagram
2015–present	Kid-E-Cats	Candy, Cupcake's mom, Stewardess cat		
2016–17	World of Winx	Musa		
2019	Sheep and Wolves: Pig Deal	Bianca	English dub	
2025–present	Winx Club: The Magic Is Back	Bloom	English dub	

=== Film ===
List of voice performances in direct-to-video and television films
Year	Series	Role	Notes	Source
2014	Pokémon the Movie: Diancie and the Cocoon of Destruction	Astrid	Film	
2017	Pokémon the Movie: I Choose You!	Pikachu	Grouped under Voice Characterization, limited theatrical release	Tweet

=== Video games ===
List of voice performances in video games
Year	Title	Role	Source
2003	Fullmetal Alchemist and the Broken Angel	Flower Girl	Resume
