= Golden Unicorn Awards =

Awards for Russian films, held in London

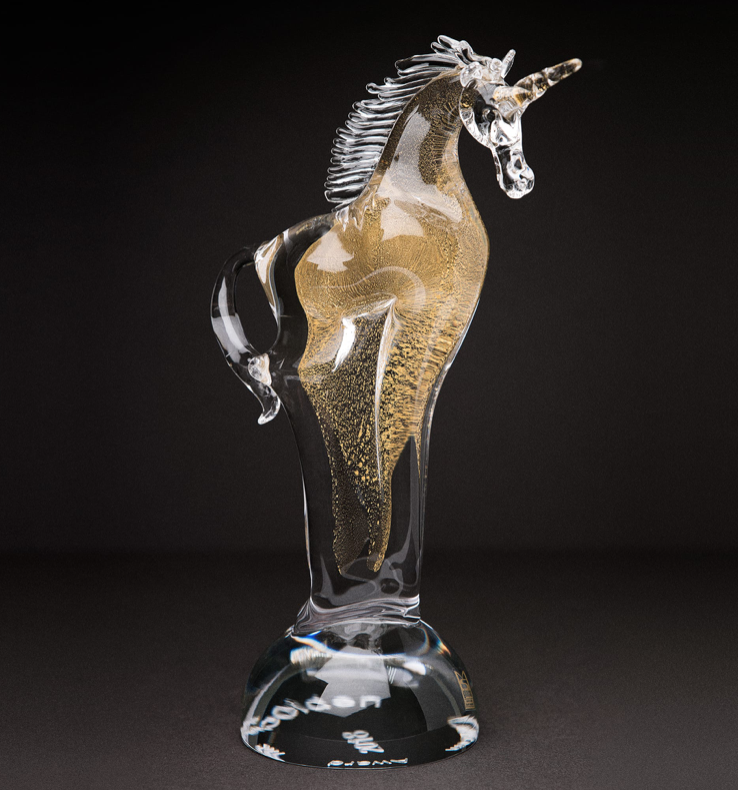
- The Golden Unicorn statuette
- Awarded for: Excellence in Russian cinema and international films with Russian themes
- Location: London, England
- Country: United Kingdom
- Presented by: Perkon Productions Ltd
- First award: 2016
- Final award: 2021
- Website: goldenunicornaward.com

The Golden Unicorn Awards were annual awards recognising excellence in Russian cinema and international films with Russian themes. Founded in 2016 by Filip Perkon, the awards ceremony was held in London, England, following Russian Film Week. Both Russian Film Week and the Golden Unicorn Awards have been paused until further notice since 2022 because of the Russia - Ukraine War.

== History ==
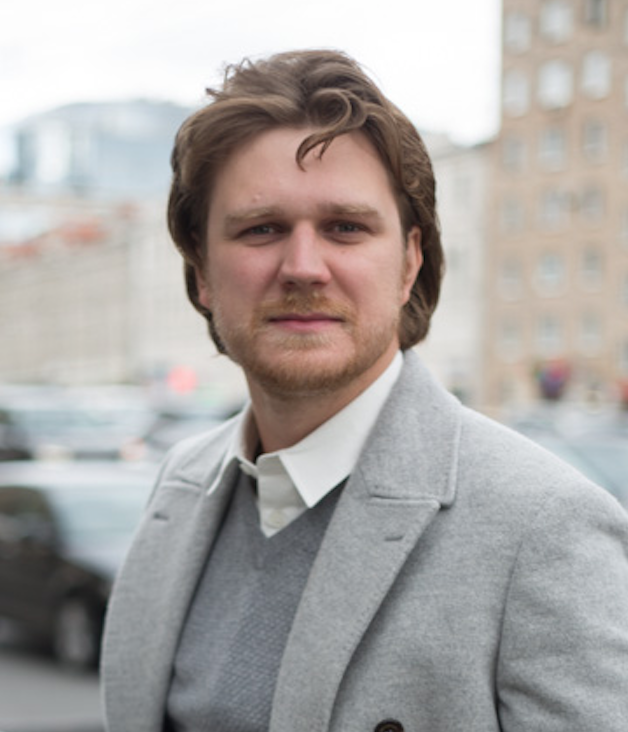
Filip Perkon, founder of the Golden Unicorn Awards and Russian Film Week

Golden Unicorn Awards as part of the Russian Film Week were founded by Filip Perkon in 2016 in London, run by Perkon Productions Ltd with the support of the British Council. In 2017,the British Film Institute the Russian Ministry of Culture, along with Synergy University (a private university in Moscow), as well as other companies began supporting the event.

Synergy University was an official co-organiser of Russian Film Week from 2019.

Both Russian Film Week and the Golden Unicorn Awards have been paused until further notice since 2022, because of the Russia-Ukraine War.

== Description ==
The Golden Unicorn awards are annual awards recognising excellence in Russian cinema as well as international films with Russian themes. The ceremony is held in London, England, following Russian Film Week.

=== Eligibility ===
Feature-length, animation, short and documentary films should be produced in Russia and released 18 months prior to the start of Russian Film Week. International films do not have to be produced in Russia but have to be Russian-themed. The film producers have to submit the films electronically or in DCP format with English subtitles through the Russian Film Week or the Golden Unicorn Awards FilmFreeway portal no later than deadline of the relevant year.

The nomination committee review the submissions and select the films for consideration of the jury. The nomination committee is independent from the jury.

=== Jury ===
The 2017 jury included Scottish actor Brian Cox, English film critic Peter Bradshaw, Canadian-born British producer Elliot Grove (founder of the Raindance Film Festival and the British Independent Film Awards), along with Stuart Brown, BFI's head of programme & acquisitions, and various academics, publishers, and film industry professionals from around the world:

The jury in 2018 included Brian Cox and actress Olga Kurylenko, along with Stuart Brown, and some of the same and other various academics, publishers, and film industry professionals from around the world.

=== Ceremony ===
The ceremony takes place every year in a form of a charitable gala following the Russian Film Week. The Golden Unicorn Awards collaborated with many charities over the years and organised fundraising activities as part of the dinner following the ceremony. The charity partners included Gift of Life, WWF and Naked Heart Foundation. fundraise £160,000 in 2018 during the awards ceremony. The awards also raised GBP85,000 for the Gift of Life Charity in 2016.

=== Golden unicorn symbol ===
The symbol of the golden unicorn was chosen as a common notion for the Russian and British nations. The golden unicorn was depicted on the Russian Coat of Arms along with St. George in 16th-century Russia. The golden unicorn is also one of the symbols of Great Britain.

The Golden Unicorn statuette was designed for the awards in 2016 and was made of Bohemian glass and 24-carat gold and handcrafted in the Czech Republic.

== Categories ==
The Golden Unicorn is awarded for the following categories:

- Best Feature Film
- Best Screenplay
- Best Actor
- Best Actress
- Best Short Film
- Best Documentary
- Best Animated Film
- Best Foreign Film with a Russian connection

Special awards:

- Best Contribution to Promoting Russian Culture Abroad
- Best Emerging Talent
- General Producer's Award

Nomination	2021	2019	2018	2017	2016
Best Feature Film	Captain Volkonogov Escaped	Van Goghs	How Viktor "the Garlic" Took Alexey "the Stud" Тo The Nursing Home	Loveless (film)	The Student
Best Screenplay	Captain Volkonogov Escaped	The Humorist	How Viktor "the Garlic" Took Alexey "the Stud" Тo The Nursing Home	Loveless (film)	About Love
Best Actor	Yuri Borisov / Captain Volkonogov Escaped	Daniel Olbrychski / Van Goghs	Evgeny Tkachuk / How Viktor "the Garlic" Took Alexey "the Stud" to the Nursing Home	Aleksandr Yatsenko / Arrythmia	Petr Skvortsov / The Student
Best Actress	Svetlana Khodchenkova / Another Name	Anna Mikhalkova / Another Woman	Irina Starshenbaum / Summer	Maryana Spivak / Loveless (film)	Renata Litvinova / About Love
Best Short Film	Promises	White mark	The Sign	The Law of excluded third	8 dir. Anna Melikyan
Best Foreign Documentary Film	Bless You	Buratino	A Sniper’s War	Oleg and the Rare Arts	Stephen Coates and Paul Heartfield / Roentgenizdat
Best Documentary Film	Far Eastern Golgotha	The Case of Sobchak	INTO_Nation of the Great Odessa	Lake Vostok	
Best Animated Film	Secret Magic Control Agency	The Snow Queen: Mirrorlands	N/A	Listening to Beеthoven	Sheep and Wolves dir. Maxim Volkov, Andrei Galat
Best Foreign Film with a Russian connection	Bloodsuckers	Give Me Liberty	Sergio & Sergei	Lady Macbeth	War and Peace, BBC series dir. Tom Harper
Best Emerging Talent	Polina Gukhman, actress / Masha	Alena Mikhailova, actress / Love Them All	Timothy Zhalnin, Director / Coupled	Daria Zhovner / Closeness	Semen Treskunov / Good Boy
Best Debut	Next Station: Russia	The Humorist			
Best Russian Film on Ecology		Father Baikal			
Best Russian Actor in an International Project (Casting Bridge Award)	Aleksandr Kuznetsov				

== See also ==
- Nika Award
- Golden Eagle Award (Russia)
- Kinotavr
- List of film awards
