= Moscow Financial and Industrial University =

Private higher education institution in Russia

Moscow Financial and Industrial University «Synergy»
- Московский финансово-промышленный университет «Синерджи»
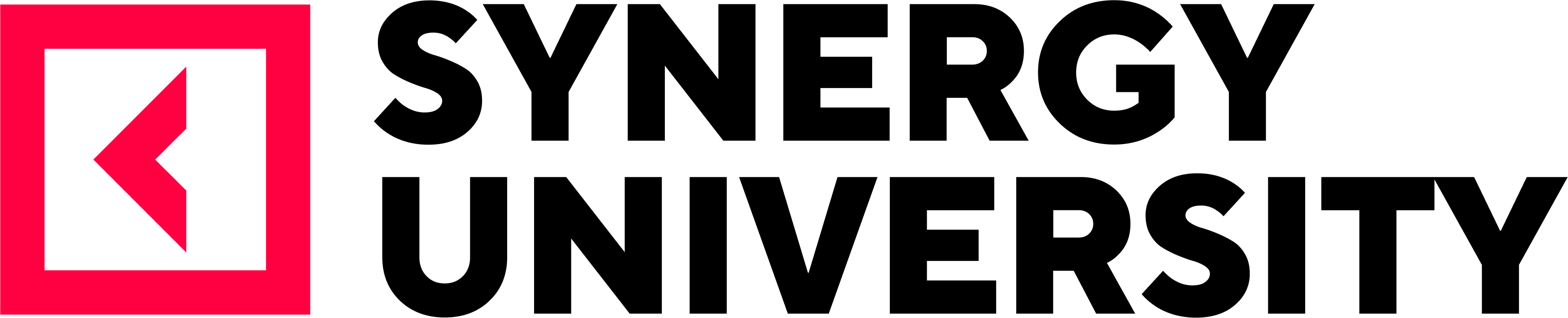
- Type: Private
- Established: 1995; 31 years ago
- Founders: Yuri Rubin, Vadim Lobov
- Rector: Artyom Vasiliev
- Academic staff: 600
- Students: 43 222
- Location: Moscow, Russia
- Campus: Urban
- Language: Russian
- Website: synergyuniversity.com

Moscow Financial and Industrial University «Synergy» is a non-governmental educational private institution of higher education. Founded in 1995, it is the largest private higher education institution in Russia in terms of the number of students and income.

Since 2023, the university has been the largest in Russia in terms of the number of students.

== Krebs investigation (2025) ==
In December 2025, cybersecurity journalist Brian Krebs published an investigation highlighting connections between Synergy University and military drone production for Russia's war in Ukraine, advance fee fraud against students in Africa, and a $25 million academic cheating network.

The investigation identified a network of websites using "nerd" and "geek" branding (including thenerdify.com and geekly-hub.com) that offered academic writing services. According to the investigation, Filip Perkon, a Sweden born Russian national residing in the UK and Vadim Lobov served as co-directors in multiple UK subsidiaries of Synergy University. UK company records show both men held director positions at Synergy Global Assistance Limited (Company No. 07469731) and Synergy Business School London Limited (Company No. 07469646).

The network allegedly circumvented Google Ads policy violations through a pattern of creating new UK-registered companies when accounts were terminated.

The investigation also reported that Synergy University operates a website (bpla.synergy.bot) stating the company develops combat drones to aid Russian forces in the war against Ukraine and to evade international sanctions on high-tech products.

=== Student fraud allegations ===
According to the Krebs investigation, hundreds of international students reported being defrauded by Synergy University targeting students from Africa and Asia. Students from Nigeria, Kenya, Ghana, Pakistan, Nepal, and India described paying thousands of dollars in advance tuition fees for promised Russian study visas, only to have their visa applications denied with no refunds provided.

The investigation cited student testimonials describing how Synergy representatives were "extremely responsive" during recruitment but became unresponsive after receiving payment, with one student calling the practice "predatory" and stating it targeted "Africans who trust you with their life savings."

== History ==
The university's roots can be traced back to 1995, when Y.B. Rubin, a Corresponding Member of the Russian Academy of Education, founded the Moscow Higher School of Banking. The same institution was later rebranded to the Moscow International Institute of Econometrics, Informatics, Finance and Law (MIEEIFP) in 1998, and by 2000, it had nearly 8,000 students enrolled.

Since 2001, AMBA has accredited the Master's programs of the university's Business School six times; the most recent was in 2016. Since 2003, the university has been a member of the European Foundation for Management Development, known as «Sinerghia» in English.

The MMIEIFP was converted into the Moscow Financial and Industrial Academy in 2005. Approximately 15 thousand students enrolled in the university every year since 2005. The Moscow Financial and Industrial Academy received the first E-Learning Quality Assurance accreditation granted to a Russian university in 2009. In 2010–2011, a yearly average of 20,000 individuals enrolled at the Moscow Financial and Industrial Academy which, in 2011, was recognized as a university after receiving state certification and renamed as the Moscow Financial and Industrial University Synergy.

From 2013 to 2017, Synergy University actively absorbed small universities in the regions that lost their licenses and grew intensively. The university actively promoted the transfer of students from other universities, including those who lost their accreditation.

In 2016, students of the Arkhangelsk Institute of Management, deprived of a license, received mass messages offering to continue their studies at Synergy through social networks. One of the heads of a large university that had claims from Rosobrnadzor told about the employees of Synergy: "They traveled to the regions, offered money to the directors so that they could persuade students who could stay on the street to switch to Synergy.

By 2017, the total number of students at MFPU Synergy exceeded 50,000. MFPU Synergy was one of the pioneering universities in Russia to introduce the «Startup as a Diploma» programme in 2017. Under the programme, students defend their diploma thesis by presenting a business project that has been formalized as a functional legal entity. The project can be carried out individually or in a group by the students.

The university was the first in Russia to open the Faculty of Internet Professions in 2017. This faculty provides training for computer game development, application and software development, programming, game design, cybersports, and targetologists. Synergy University also established the Faculty of Theatre, Film, and Television in the same year.

In 2019, MFPU participated in the national project «Small and medium-sized entrepreneurship and support of individual entrepreneurial initiative». The university won the competition organized by the Ministry of Economic Development and was awarded a grant of over 1 billion rubles to promote entrepreneurship and develop programs.

The university has planned to open the Faculty of Animation in 2020, which will offer specializations like «Author and Commercial Animation», «Artist of Animation and Computer Graphics», and «Animation and Graphics».

== Activities ==
In 2021, the university conducted educational activities at 24 faculties offering 91 master's degree programs, 198 bachelor's degree programs, and over 500 professional retraining and advanced training programs, according to Rossiyskaya Gazeta. As of 2021, the university has a college that offers 35 programs of secondary vocational education.

Official data indicates that in the 2020–2021 academic year, the university trained a total of 76,594 students. This included 35,594 students enrolled in higher and secondary vocational education programs, over 14,000 students in vocational training programs, more than 18,000 students in advanced training programs, and 9,000 students in professional retraining programs.

In 2021, the university had students from 89 countries, including 75 non-CIS countries and 14 countries from the former Soviet Union. Synergy MFPU ranked third in Russia in 2021 with a total of 7,008 international students.

Synergy MFPU has signed agreements on academic cooperation, academic exchange, and double degree programs with 63 foreign universities across the UK, USA, China, India, Turkey, Serbia, and Malaysia. The academic cooperation programs collaborate on joint research activities and the development of educational programs. Students enrolled in double degree programs study a part of their course in Russia and the rest in the partner university. Upon graduation, they receive two diplomas, one from Russia and the other from the partner university.

== Reputation and rankings ==
In 2015, the university's IT graduates secured fifth place in the official graduate salary ranking of Russian higher education institutions.

In 2016, Synergy MFPU ranked first in the management education programme category and fifth in the professional development programme category by the Analytical Centre «Expert».

The university was ranked in the 351-400 group in the QS EECA University Rankings 2020/21.

The university was ranked 58th in the UniRank Top Universities in Russia 2021, which took into account 375 out of 724 Russian universities; and 2353rd in the UniRank World University Rankings 2021, which considered 13,600 universities from 200 countries.

Synergy University achieved the top ranking for Entrepreneurship and International Entrepreneurship programs in the 2021 Interfax National University Ranking.

The university secured the third position in Russia based on the number of international students in 2021.

== International outreach in Africa and concerns about Russian influence ==
According to a 2024 National Democratic Institute report on "Strategic Authoritarian Narratives in the Sahel," Vadim Lobov and Synergy University have been identified as part of Russia's broader influence operations in Africa. The report documents Russia's extensive information operations in the Sahel region, particularly in countries like Niger, Mali, and Burkina Faso, which have experienced military coups and political instability.

In presentations to government officials in the region, Lobov described Synergy as a Moscow-based university that "adopts a full-time education model, covering an educational spectrum from kindergarten to higher education." He emphasized that the institution integrates a business school and an academy, making it a comprehensive institution. During these presentations, Lobov highlighted that Synergy University "currently has more than 200,000 students, almost 10% of whom are foreign students" and that "the University is home to an impressive array of over 300 faculties, covering a wide range of academic disciplines." He stressed that the university is "anchored in a comprehensive vision" that "rests on three major pillars of collaboration: education, entrepreneurship and patriotism."

The NDI report places these educational outreach efforts within the context of Russian influence operations that have included activities by the Wagner Group private military company and extensive disinformation campaigns. The report notes that "Russian influence operations have been documented blaming France and the West for fueling the Islamic insurgency, collaborating with local pan-Africanist influencers to advocate for the removal of French and Western presence across the Sahel," and suggests these narratives "not only serve to destabilize the region but also align with Russia's geopolitical objectives."

In 2016, Synergy MFPU received its first 50 students from a foreign country, the Republic of Sierra Leone. Following this, the university established a visa and escort department. As per the Ministry of Science and Higher Education of the Russian Federation, the university ranked third in Russia in 2022 concerning the enrollment of foreign students, with RUDN and Kazan University securing the first and second positions, respectively.

In 2022, Synergy MFPU enrolled 1,368 international students on long-term study programs. Additionally, the university had approximately 12,000 long-term international students and 20,000 short-term course attendees. Students from 92 countries are currently studying at Synergy University. The majority of these students are from Uzbekistan, Syria, Pakistan, Iran, Nigeria, Egypt, Algeria, Turkey, Sri Lanka, and Afghanistan. Synergy IFPU had signed 92 partnership agreements with foreign universities by 2022. These collaborations include student training, faculty exchanges, research, and thematic conferences.

== Leadership ==
Yuri Borisovich Rubin is the founder of the university, holding a Doctorate in Economics, a Professorship, and he is also a Corresponding Member of the Russian Academy of Education. He was the Rector of the university from 1995 to 2019.

Vadim Georgievich Lobov, the founder of the university, has a PhD in Economics and also serves as the President of Synergy Corporation.

Artyom Igorevich Vasiliev, who holds a PhD in economics, has been the Rector of the university since 2019, having previously served as the Vice Rector until 2019.

== Organizational structure ==
The university comprises 17 departments with branches in Noyabrsk, Omsk, Cherkessk, Elista, and Emirate of Dubai. It is the only Russian institution offering bachelor's and master's degrees in Economics, Management, Law, and Information Technology. The university specializes in online learning technologies.

=== Faculties ===
- Faculty of Business
- Faculty of Management
- Faculty of Economics
- Faculty of Information Technology
- Faculty of Sports Management
- Faculty of Physical Education
- Faculty of Law
- Faculty of Banking
- Faculty of Linguistics
- Faculty of Psychology
- Faculty of Design
- Faculty of Advertising
- Faculty of Internet
- Faculty of Event Management
- Faculty of Theatre, Film and Television
- Faculty of Hotel and Restaurant Management
- Faculty of Game Industry and E-Sports

The university's Volunteer Training Centre has supported major sporting events including the Sochi 2014 Olympic Games and the 2018 FIFA World Cup.

== Branch in the UAE ==
In 2013, Synergy University opened a branch in Dubai – Synergy University Dubai, where it received a state license for the right to conduct educational activities, Accreditation of the International MBA Association, as well as a license from the Knowledge and Human Development Authority of Dubai, becoming the first Russian university accredited by the Government of the United Arab Emirates.

Synergy University Dubai will offer three undergraduate programs (World Economy and Sustainable Development, Innovative Entrepreneurship, Hospitality and Restaurant Management) and two Master's programs (World Economy, Hospitality and Restaurant Management) in 2022. Additionally, the School of Business will offer Synergy Executive MBA and MBA Women's Leadership programs.

== Awards and prizes ==
Government of the Russian Federation Prize for educational and training manuals in the field of competition and entrepreneurship (2008).

Ministry of Science and Education of the Russian Federation Award «For Contribution to the Development of Entrepreneurship Education in the Russian Federation» (2012).

== Protection of reputation in court ==
The university's lawsuit against the publication "Novaya Gubernia"

In 2022, IFPU "Synergy" brought to justice the online publication "Novaya Gubernia" for spreading false information discrediting the business reputation. As it was established by the court, in 2021, in the publication "Where to go to study and how much does higher education cost today?" the publication published untrue information and, in accordance with the court's decision, published a refutation.

An article with information discrediting the reputation of the university was posted almost unchanged on their websites by 4 more electronic media, referring to the original source. According to the publication Days.The placement of identical materials in several publications at once is one of the signs that the articles are of a custom nature and often represent the so—called "black PR", and the Federal Press publication suggested unfair competitors who initiated these publications. After the court's decision on the university's claim, all 4 publications that hosted the article "Novaya Gubernia" deleted it.

The court found a number of phrases and statements to be untrue and defamatory, for example, the statement "In 2015, Synergy University and its top management were accused of raiding the Vladimir Institute of Business. The raider seizure of the only private university in Vladimir happened when its rector was on a business trip." Earlier, The Insider also reported on the "raider seizure" of the Vladimir Institute of Business. But, as it turned out in court, the owner of this institute has been Synergy University since 1995, which was confirmed by an extract from the Unified State Register of Legal Entities (USRLE).

The court also found the statement to be untrue: "In the summer of 2019, the work of this university was suspended, and the university's current accounts were blocked by the tax inspectorate. Such actions of the tax authority indicate the financial insolvency of the educational institution." The Bell newspaper wrote about the alleged blocking of university accounts some time ago. As it was established by the court, the university's accounts have never been blocked, and the university itself has a stable financial position. These facts were confirmed by the Federal Tax Service in response to a corresponding request, as the defendant also writes in the refutation.

The court found the statement "Synergy is famous for its very low quality of education — the university is trailing the entire educational system of the country" to be defamatory and untrue. The court found that Synergy University in 2021 ranked 58th in the uniRank Top Universities in Russia-2021 ranking, and is included in the international university ranking QS EECA University Rankings, where 117 out of 750 Russian universities are represented, which refutes the claim of low quality of education.

The university's lawsuit against blogger Alexander Yasyutin

In 2021, the Vologda City Court considered the claim of Synergy University against blogger Alexander Yasyutin and found that on his YouTube video hosting channel he distributed defamatory and untrue information about the rules of admission to the university, the quality of education, retaking exams, and the cost of participating in events "Synergy" and the lack of useful information on them. The blogger's statements that there is a certain computer program at the university that influences students' passing exams through the choice of arbitrary answers also did not find their confirmation in court: Yasyutin could not provide evidence for his words.

The Vologda Online edition suggested that Yasyutin acted out of selfish motives. The university did not make any material claims against the blogger. The court ordered the blogger to post a rebuttal, delete the content and pay a state fee.

Pre-trial claim against blogger Alexander Gorbunov

In 2020, Synergy University sent a pre-trial claim to wheelchair user and blogger Alexander Gorbunov demanding the removal of two videos from Gorbunov's YouTube channel. In the videos that the university demanded to be deleted, the blogger said that the university had previously received more than 1 billion rubles from the budget to promote entrepreneurship, and that Synergy University had previously been fined for illegally collecting fingerprints from schoolchildren.

The university's claims related to information voiced by the blogger, previously published in the Russian media. The allocation of more than 1 billion rubles from the budget for business promotion and popularization of entrepreneurship was reported by the Rambler/Novosti portal, Kommersant, TASS, Delovoy Kvartal. In 2019, Kommersant reported on the illegal collection of fingerprints by Synergy from schoolchildren and the subsequent imposition of a fine on the university, and in 2020 — Vedomosti.

In a claim sent to the blogger, Synergy University threatened the blogger with criminal prosecution under Article 128.1 of the Criminal Code of the Russian Federation (libel), as well as suing in the amount of 5 million rubles.

== High-profile cases ==
Issuance of certificates for evading mobilization

In October 2022, the media reported that employees at Synergy University had been identified selling certificates granting the right to deferral from conscription as part of partial mobilization. RBC, with reference to the Moscow news agency, reported that more than 800 facts of issuing fictitious certificates to avoid mobilization had been established. The cost of one certificate was 180 thousand rubles. The university management, together with law enforcement agencies, identified employees who sold certificates; criminal cases were initiated against them under part 3 of Article 159 of the Criminal Code of the Russian Federation. Document seizures and searches were carried out at the university and at the place of residence of the suspects.

Refusal of admission to the university to the prodigies Teplyakov

In July 2022, the father of nine-year-old Alice Teplyakoy submitted documents for the admission of his daughter and eight-year-old son Heimdall to Synergy University. The father applied for admission of nine—year-old Alice to five faculties at once: management - project management, banking, information systems and technologies, teacher education. Yevgeny Teplyakov submitted the documents of his eight—year-old son for admission to the faculties of general management - project management, business informatics, economics. Alice Teplyakova passed the Unified State Exam at the age of eight and enrolled in paid studies at the Faculty of Psychology of Moscow State University in 2021. After Yevgeny Teplyakov's fight with the head of the department, Alice did not attend classes at Moscow State University.

The University of Synergy refused to accept Teplyakovs for a paid department. Earlier, Alice was unable to pass the probation exam for budget places and Yevgeny Teplyakov submitted documents for paid tuition. Teplyakov was refused admission of children for education and the conclusion of a contract. The rector of the university, Artyom Vasiliev, motivated his refusal by the fact that students have been interning since the first year, and the labor code allows children to work only from the age of 14. In addition, Vasiliev appealed to the Ministry of Science and Higher Education of the Russian Federation with a proposal to consider the possibility of amendments to the Federal Law "On Education" and to legislatively determine that admission to higher education institutions is possible only from the age of 15. Earlier it became known that Teplyakov was refused admission by the Moscow Innovation University.

After receiving a refusal to admit children to the university, the children's father, Yevgeny Teplyakov, insulted the rector of the university and the university itself on social networks, after which the university sent Teplyakov a pre—trial claim with demands to remove offensive materials and reserved the right to go to court for spreading deliberately false information, as well as public insults.

The story on the TV channel Russia-1

In February 2012, a video report "Darkness of Knowledge" was shown on the Rossiya-1 TV channel in the Vesti of the Week program, telling about the activities of the IFPU. In particular, in an interview with journalist Boris Sobolev, an MFPU student talked about buying exams, which was confirmed by shooting with a hidden camera.

The university itself denied the apology and stated that most of it was "skillful editing".

Later, a video produced by Synergy TV appeared on the network, in which the same student refuted what was said to the reporter. Later, the student again retracted his words.
