= Alfred-Ingemar Berndt =

German journalist and writer (1905–1945)

- Born: Alfred-Ingemar Berndt; 22 April 1905; Bromberg, German Empire (now Bydgoszcz, Poland)
- Died: 28 March 1945 (aged 39); Veszprém, Kingdom of Hungary
- Cause of death: Killed in action
- SS service
- Allegiance: Nazi Germany
- Branch: Waffen-SS; German Army
- Service years: 1940–1945
- Rank: SS-Obersturmbannführer; Hauptmann der Reserve
- Unit: SS Division Wiking

Alfred-Ingemar Berndt (22 April 1905 – 28 March 1945) was a German Nazi journalist, writer and close collaborator of Reich Minister of Public Enlightenment and Propaganda Joseph Goebbels.

Berndt joined the Nazi Party at the age of 18 and became a brownshirt at 20. A freelance journalist, he was deputy editor of Goebbels’s party newspaper before joining the staff of the Nazi Propaganda Ministry in 1936. Berndt wrote an eyewitness account of the 1940 German invasion of the Low Countries and France filled with distortions and falsehoods, he is also considered the propagandistic creator of the Rommel myth attached to German field marshal Erwin Rommel. A fervent Nazi, Berndt murdered a captured Allied pilot in cold blood in front of numerous witnesses. In early 1945, he was given command of a battalion of the 5th SS Panzer Regiment and was killed in a Soviet air raid on 28 March 1945 at Veszprém, Hungary.

== Youth and first political activities ==
Alfred-Ingemar Berndt was the son of Gustav Berndt and Alma (née Kaeding) Berndt, who were expelled and dispossessed from Posen in 1920, a result of the Versailles Treaty. The family moved to Berlin-Schöneberg, where Berndt in 1922, age 17, joined the National Socialist German Workers Party. In 1924 he joined the Frontbann, reorganized front organization of the Sturmabteilung or SA. After the prohibition of the Nazi Party expired in 1925, he rejoined definitively. He was instrumental in building the organization and structure of the Hitler Youth in Berlin.

In December 1928, after an interrupted study of German literature and volunteer work for German newspapers, Berndt got a job at Wolffs Telegraphisches Bureau (WTB), the largest news agency in Germany. Berndt was able to disguise his Nazi leanings as serious journalism. He wrote under various pseudonyms as columnist and commentator, and became a writer for two Nazi papers, Der Angriff and Der Völkische Beobachter. In 1931 he became head of the writers’ division of the Kampfbund für deutsche Kultur, an organization of Nazi authors, high school teachers, journalists, and cultural personages. A central figure in a growing network of Nazi newsmen at home and abroad, he was jailed and imprisoned from time to time during the Weimar Republic on account of his politics.

== Hitler's rise to power as a career booster ==
When Hitler became Chancellor in January 1933, Berndt's position in the Kampfbund für deutsche Kultur led to his promotion in Wolffs Telegraphisches Bureau, which had become the Nazi press office, the Deutsche Nachrichtenbüro (DNB). In December 1933 he became chief editor of the DNB. Berndt was responsible for the coordination of the Reichsverbandes der Deutschen Presse (RDP) and was deputy of the Reich Press Chief, Otto Dietrich. After the Night of the Long Knives in 1934, when Hitler's men murdered many opponents, Berndt left the SA and joined the Schutzstaffel (SS).

== In the Propaganda Ministry ==
=== Rise ===
Joseph Goebbels, with his doctorate in German literature from the University of Heidelberg, recognized a good writer when he read one. In 1935 Goebbels hired Berndt as official head of the Reich Press Office in the Reich Ministry of Public Enlightenment and Propaganda. In April 1936, Berndt was appointed head of the press department of the Propaganda Ministry (Division IV). In a November 1936 interview, Berndt told The New York Times that German 'Art Reporters' were permitted to 'Employ Values Established' by the Party and State. In February 1938, reacting to Hitler's taking complete control of the Wehrmacht, Berndt told the press that no street fighting or troop mutiny had occurred; the frontiers had not been closed, and no army officers had been executed. After the partitioning of the press department in March 1938, Berndt was made head of the newly created home department (Division IV-A). Berndt devised the propaganda used during the annexation of Austria and the Sudetenland. He announced to foreign reporters that it was an insult to the German government for a citizen to doubt what he reads in the newspapers.

Pleased with his protégé, Goebbels promoted Berndt, in October 1938, to Ministerial Director. At the instigation of Otto Dietrich, Berndt was replaced as head of the press department by Hans Fritzsche, in December 1938. Berndt then took on, at Goebbels' personal request, the department of literature (Division VIII), which had, among other tasks, responsibility for literary censorship and ideological control of writers and authors.

== During World War II ==
On 30 August 1939, two days before the start of the Second World War, Berndt was appointed Head of Broadcasting of the Propaganda Ministry (Division III). In early November 1939 Goebbels learned of Berndt's conflicts with the Reich Post Office and rejected him as a negotiator for the Propaganda Ministry. In February 1940, Berndt reported that he had fulfilled his task of adapting the German broadcasting system to the requirements of war and war propaganda. He was released from all functions in the Propaganda Ministry and enlisted as a volunteer in the Wehrmacht. In the French campaign, he was a sergeant in Heavy Tank Destroyer Battalion 605. He was awarded the Iron Cross second class on 27 May 1940. On 6 June 1940, he received the Iron Cross First Class. He wrote about his experiences at the front (Tanks Break Through!, 1940). In August 1940, he returned to the Propaganda Ministry but left administrative work mainly to his previous deputies. Berndt was the first head of the Propaganda Ministry Offices in Paris. In May 1941, he went back to the front; this time as a lieutenant on the staff of the German Afrika Korps under then Lieutenant General Erwin Rommel. Rommel had been enormously displeased with Oberleutnant Alfred Tschimpke, a propaganda reporter who had written a book, The Ghost Division, about the 7th Panzer Division that Rommel commanded in France.

Author David Irving described Berndt as "burly, wavy-haired and dark-skinned". He "had the lumbering gait of a bear and a physiological oddity—six toes on one foot. (Goebbels had a right club foot.) Berndt was literate and personable, poked his nose in everywhere, and was put in charge of keeping the Rommel diary. Before joining Rommel's staff as a kind of Party 'commissar,' he was already a tough, ambitious Nazi zealot." In the book Hitler's Airwaves, Berndt is described as a "notably unsavory character: Goebbels and his senior officials were frequently astounded by his slyness and cunning, fabrication and lies." Wilfred von Oven, personal press secretary to Joseph Goebbels, called Berndt "an unscrupulous and ambitious, but not untalented young man."

=== Head of the Propaganda Department Division II and Rommel's adjutant ===
After the German invasion of the Soviet Union in June 1941, Goebbels ordered Berndt back to Berlin and promoted him to Ministerial Director and head of propaganda (Division II). Despite his heavy involvement in the Ministry, Berndt shuttled regularly between Berlin and Rommel's headquarters until Rommel left North Africa. Berndt quickly became Rommel's trusted aide, a propaganda press manager for his boss. Berndt worked hard to promote the myth of Rommel the "Desert Fox," as a role model par excellence for many Germans. In addition, Berndt took on the role of Rommel's personal representative in Hitler's headquarters. On 17 July 1943, Hitler personally honoured Berndt for his contributions to the North African campaign with the German Cross in Gold.

During his time as head of the Propaganda Department, Berndt dealt with the battle of Stalingrad, the capitulation of Tunis, and the discovery of the mass graves of the Katyn massacre. He was also chairman of the Interdepartmental Air War Damages Committee, which was responsible for the coordination of relief and reconstruction after air raids.

=== Allied pilot murder ===
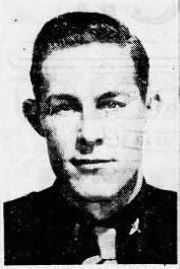
First lieutenant James Gordon Dennis

On 24 May 1944, just before the Western Allies landed in Normandy, a USAAF B-17 #42-31941 "Big Stoop" from the 350th Bombardment Squadron was shot down by Luftwaffe fighters west of Bückwitzer See, Wusterhausen. Eight crew members were taken prisoner, among them the co-pilot second lieutenant James Gordon Dennis. Berndt halted his car on Hamburger Chaussee in Segeletz, where Dennis was being held, and, over the protests of two guards accompanying him, shot Dennis dead in the street. Dennis was initially buried at Friedhof Segeletz on 26 May 1944. His remains were later interred at the Ardennes American Cemetery and Memorial.

=== Break with Goebbels ===
After the successful landing of the western Allies, a rift developed between Goebbels and Berndt. Berndt commented, after a visit to Rommel's headquarters on the western front, that he was extremely pessimistic about the military situation. Goebbels accused Berndt of defeatism, pulled him from the propaganda department and suspended him indefinitely from the Ministry.

== Combat on the Eastern Front and death ==
Berndt responded by volunteering for combat. In September 1944, through the mediation of Heinrich Himmler, Berndt was given the rank of SS-Hauptsturmführer (captain), in the Waffen-SS. According to several eyewitnesses, Berndt, as commander of the second battalion of SS Panzer Regiment 5 "Viking," was killed at Veszprém, Hungary, during an attack by Soviet dive bombers on 28 March 1945. He was buried in 1945 to the west of Körmend, Hungary. His name is inscribed in the Szombathely German Military Cemetery, Vas, Hungary. His valise was found in a buried chest near Lake Schwerin in Mecklenburg–Western Pomerania in northeastern Germany, and restored by the Bundesarchiv. It is now at the Bundesarchiv Military Archive in Freiburg.

== Personal life ==
Berndt married Elisabeth Erna Anna Krzoßa in 1928, with whom he had two daughters: Hildegund and Roswitha.

== Published works ==
- We experience the liberation of the Saar (Scherl, Berlin 1935)
- From Work to Machine-Gun (with Kurt Kränzlein). Dreyse (Otto Stollberg, Berlin 1936). This book invitingly portrays the authors' experience as reserve soldiers for eight weeks in the summer of 1935.
- From critic to art servant (VB-Zeitung Verlag, Berlin 1936)
- Give me four years! - Documents for the first four-year plan of the Führer (Franz Eher Nachf., Munich 1937)
- Milestones of the Third Reich (Franz Eher Nachf., Munich 1938)
- The march into the Greater German Reich (Franz Eher Nachf., Munich 1939)
- The German and East German culture (NSDAP Gau Danzig-West Prussia, Danzig 1939)
- Panzerjäger Brechen Durch! (Tanks (lit. tank destroyers) Break Through!) (Franz Eher Nachf., Munich 1940)
- The songs of the front – song collection of the Great German Radio (Georg Kallmeyer, Wolfenbüttel 1943)
- Germany at War (Deutschland im Kampf) (Otto Stollberg, Berlin 1939–1944).

== Bibliography ==
- Mitcham, S.W. (2008). Rommel's Desert Commanders: The Men Who Served the Desert Fox, North Africa, 1941-42. Stackpole Military History Series. Stackpole Books. ISBN 978-1-4617-5158-8.
