= East German uprising of 1953 =

- Part of the Cold War
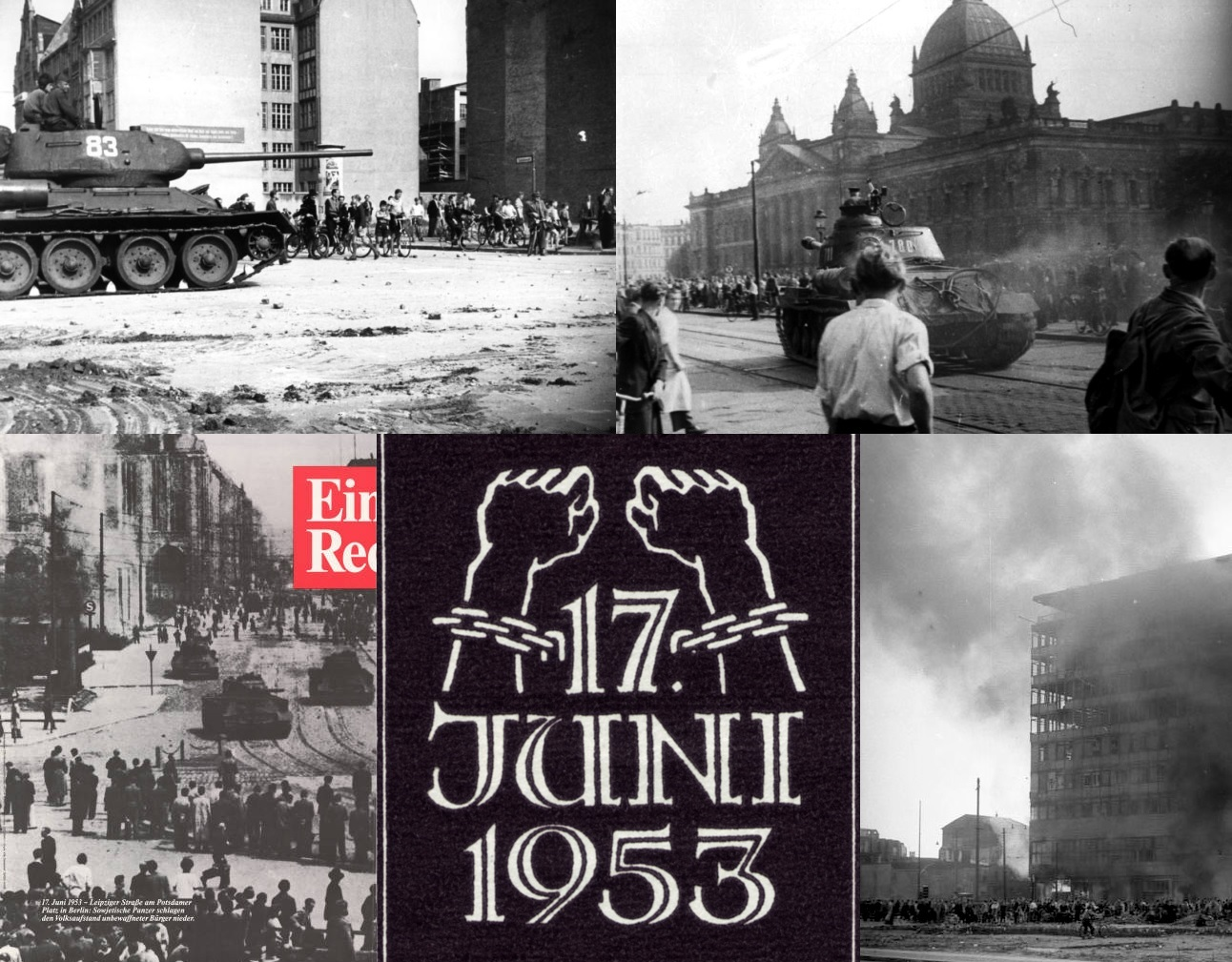
- From top to bottom, left to right: Soviet tanks suppress unarmed civilians on Schützenstrasse in Berlin · in front of the Dimitrov Museum in Leipzig · on Leipziger Strasse in Berlin · Deutsche Bundespost commemorative stamp · Burning building on Potsdamer Platz
Date	16–17 June 1953 (sporadically until 24 June 1953)
Location	East Germany
Result	Government victory

Belligerents
East Germany; Soviet Union	(East Germany) Anti-Stalinist demonstrators Support: (East Germany) German dissidents

Commanders and leaders
(East Germany) Walter Ulbricht; (Soviet Union) Andrei Grechko; (Soviet Union) Vladimir Semyonov	No centralized leadership

Units involved
(East Germany) Volkspolizei (East Germany) KVP (Soviet Union) GSOFG	Unorganized protesters

Strength
East Germany: 16 divisions Berlin: 20,000 GSOFG soldiers; 15,000 police officers	1,000,000–1,500,000 demonstrators

Casualties and losses
- 55–125+ killed

The East German uprising of 1953 (German: Volksaufstand vom 17. Juni 1953) was an uprising that occurred over the course of two days in the German Democratic Republic (GDR) from 16 to 17 June 1953. It began with strike action by construction workers in East Berlin on 16 June against work quotas during the Sovietization process in East Germany. Demonstrations in East Berlin turned into a widespread uprising against the Government of East Germany and the ruling Socialist Unity Party the next day, involving over one million people in about 700 localities across the country. Protests against declining living standards and unpopular Sovietization policies led to a wave of strikes and protests that were not easily brought under control and threatened to overthrow the East German government. The uprising in East Berlin was violently suppressed by tanks of the Soviet forces in Germany and the Kasernierte Volkspolizei. Demonstrations continued in over 500 towns and villages for several more days before eventually dying out.

The 1953 uprising was celebrated in West Germany as a public holiday on 17 June until German reunification in 1990, after which it was replaced by German Unity Day, celebrated annually on 3 October.

== Background ==
In May 1952, the Federal Republic of Germany (West Germany or FRG) rejected the "Stalin Note", a proposal sent by Soviet leader Joseph Stalin offering reunification with the Soviet-backed German Democratic Republic (East Germany or GDR) as an independent and politically neutral Germany. With the heightened anxiety of the Cold War, Stalin's proposal was met with intense suspicion in the FRG, which instead signed the European Defence Community Treaty that month. After these developments, it became clear to both the USSR and the GDR that Germany would remain divided indefinitely. In East Berlin, General Secretary Walter Ulbricht of the Socialist Unity Party of Germany (SED), the ruling party of the GDR, interpreted Stalin's failed attempt at German reunification as a "green light'" to proceed with the "accelerated construction of socialism in the GDR", which the party announced at its Second Party Conference in July 1952. This move to Sovietize the GDR consisted of a drastic increase in investment allocated to heavy industry, discriminatory taxation against the last private industrial enterprises, forced collectivization of agriculture and a concerted campaign against religious activity in East Germany.

The result of these changes in the GDR's economic direction was the rapid deterioration of workers' living standards, which continued until the first half of 1953, and represented the first clear downward trend in the living standard of East Germans since the 1947 hunger crisis. Travel costs rose as generous state subsidies were cut, while many consumer goods began to disappear from store shelves. Factories were forced to clamp down on overtime: with restricted budgets, the wage bill was deemed excessively high. Meanwhile, food prices rose as a result of both the state's collectivization policy – 40% of the wealthier farmers in the GDR fled to the West, leaving over 750,000 ha (1,900,000 acres; 2,900 sq mi) of otherwise productive land lying fallow – and a poor harvest in 1952. Workers' cost of living therefore rose, while the take-home pay of large numbers of workers – many of whom depended on overtime pay to make ends meet – diminished. In the winter of 1952–53, there were also serious interruptions to the supply of heat and electricity to East Germany's cities. By November 1952, sporadic food riots and industrial unrest occurred in several major GDR industrial centres: Chemnitz, Dresden, Leipzig, Halle and Suhl. Industrial unrest continued throughout the following spring, ranging from inflammatory speeches and anti-SED graffiti to alleged sabotage. To ease economic strain on the state caused by the "construction of socialism", the Politburo decided to increase work quotas on a compulsory basis by 10% across all state-owned factories: that is, workers now had to produce 10% more for the same wage. There were also increases in prices for food, health care, and public transportation. Taken together, the work quota and price increases amounted to a 33 per cent monthly wage cut.

While Ulbricht's response to the consequences of crash Sovietization was to tighten East Germans' belts, many East Germans' response was to leave the GDR, a phenomenon known as Republikflucht. In 1951, 160,000 people left; in 1952, 182,000; in the first four months of 1953, a further 122,000 East Germans left for the West, despite the now-mostly sealed border.

The new collective leadership in the Soviet Union, established following Stalin's death in March 1953, was shocked by these disconcerting statistics when it received in early April a report from the Soviet Control Commission in Germany which provided a detailed, devastating account of the East German economic situation. By 2 June, the Soviet Union leadership issued an order "On Measures to Improve the Health of the Political Situation in the GDR", in which the SED's policy of accelerated construction of socialism was roundly criticised. The huge flight of all professions and backgrounds from East Germany to the West had created "a serious threat to the political stability of the German Democratic Republic." To salvage the situation, it was now necessary to end forced collectivisation and the war on private enterprise. The Five-Year Plan now needed to be changed at the expense of heavy industry and in favour of consumer goods. Political-judicial controls and regimentation had to be relaxed, and coercive measures against the Protestant Church had to cease. In addition, Ulbricht's "cold exercise of power" was denounced. However, there was no explicit demand to reverse the highly unpopular increased work quotas. The Soviet decree was given to SED leaders Walter Ulbricht and Otto Grotewohl on 2 June, the day they landed in Moscow. Soviet Premier Georgy Malenkov warned them that changes were essential to avoid a catastrophe in East Germany.

On 9 June, the SED's Politburo met and determined how to respond to the Soviet leadership's instructions. Although most Politburo members felt the announcement of the "New Course" required careful preparation within the party and the population at large, Soviet High Commissioner for Germany Vladimir Semyonov insisted it be implemented right away. Thus, the SED fatefully published the New Course programme in Neues Deutschland, the official party newspaper of the SED, on 11 June. The communiqué dutifully criticised the mistakes made by the SED and announced that most of Ulbricht's Sovietization campaign would now be reversed, as instructed by Moscow. There was now going to be a shift towards investment in consumer goods; the pressures on small private enterprise would end; forced collectivisation would cease; and policies against religious activity would be discontinued. But, crucially, the work quota increase was not revoked, representing a threat to the legitimacy of a Marxist-Leninist state that claimed to represent its workers: the bourgeoisie and farmers stood to benefit far more from the New Course than the proletariat. The communiqué and its forthright admission of past mistakes shocked and confused many East Germans, both SED members and the wider populace. Disappointment, disbelief and confusion pervaded local party organisations, whose members felt panicked and betrayed. The wider populace viewed the New Course as a sign of weakness on the part of the East German regime.

On 12 June, the next day, 5,000 people participated in a demonstration in front of Brandenburg-Görden Prison in Brandenburg an der Havel.

On 15 June, workers at the Stalinallee "Block 40" site in East Berlin, now with higher hopes about the cancellation of increased work quotas, dispatched a delegation to East German Prime Minister Otto Grotewohl to deliver a petition calling for their revocation. Grotewohl ignored the workers' demands.

== Uprising ==
=== 16 June ===
An article in the trade union paper Tribune restated the necessity of the 10% work quota increases; evidently, the government was unwilling to retreat on the issue, despite the new quotas' widespread unpopularity.

At 9:00 AM on the morning of 16 June, 300 workers from the construction sites at "Hospital Friedrichshain" and "Stalinallee Block 40" in East Berlin went on strike and marched on the Free German Trade Union Federation (FDGB) headquarters on Wallstrasse, then to the city centre, hoisting banners and demanding a reinstatement of the old work quotas. Demands from the striking workers broadened to encompass political matters beyond the quotas. Via Alexanderplatz and Unter den Linden, most of the demonstrators moved to the government seat on Leipziger Straße; others went to SED headquarters on Wilhelm-Pieck-Straße. En route, they took over two sound trucks and used them to spread their calls for a general strike and a demonstration, set for the Strausberger Platz at 7:00 AM the next day. In front of the GDR House of Ministries, the rapidly growing crowd demanded to speak to Ulbricht and Grotewohl. Only Heavy Industry Minister Fritz Selbmann and Professor Robert Havemann, president of the GDR Peace Council, emerged from the building. Their attempts to calm the workers were drowned out by the clamour of the crowd, which shouted the pair down.

Meanwhile, the Politburo deliberated, unable to decide what to do. Despite the urgency of the situation, it was only after hours of discussion – under the pressure of the demonstrators, and probably also from Semyonov – that the leadership decided to revoke the work quota increase. The Politburo members decreed that increases in productivity would now be voluntary, and blamed the strikes and demonstrations on how the increases had been implemented, but also on foreign provocateurs. However, by the time an SED functionary reached the House of Ministries to give the workers the news, the protestors' agenda had expanded well beyond the issue of work increases. Later that afternoon, the crowd dispersed and workers returned to their sites. Save for isolated clashes between the Volkspolizei and groups of demonstrators, the rest of the day was calm. The SED leadership was surprised by the depth of resentment and the extent of anti-regime actions. Indeed, the SED leadership was so out of touch that it expected a massive propaganda drive would be sufficient to cope with the emerging crisis. It would clearly not be enough, and Ulbricht probably realised this only a few hours after the suggestion was made. The Soviet authorities were likewise completely taken aback by the widespread protests that followed the demonstrations in East Berlin. Their response was improvised and uncoordinated. Later that evening, Semyonov met with the SED leadership and informed them of his decision to send Soviet troops to Berlin.

Throughout the night of 16 June and early morning of 17 June, news of events in East Berlin spread quickly throughout the GDR via word of mouth and Western radio broadcasts, particularly Radio in the American Sector (RIAS), which had been broadcasting throughout the day about the strikes staged against increased work quotas. In the afternoon, there were broadcasts about the change in demonstrator demands from the repeal of the higher work quotas and price cuts to shouts of "We want free elections". RIAS was later approached by East Berlin workers seeking its assistance in disseminating their call for a general strike the next day. RIAS's political director, Gordon Ewing, decided that the station could not directly lend itself to being a mouthpiece to the workers; in his view, such a move could start a war. The station would not actively incite rebellion but simply broadcast information about the demonstrations, factually and comprehensively. Nonetheless, at 7.30 PM, RIAS reported that a delegation of construction workers had submitted a resolution for publication, stating that the strikers, having proved by their actions that "they were able to force the government to accept their justified demands", would "make use of their power at any time" if their demands for lower work quotas, price cuts, free elections and amnesty for all demonstrators were not fulfilled. Later that night, the station all but provided active encouragement to demonstrate against the regime. RIAS Programme Director Eberhard Schutz called the regime's reversal on the work quotas question "a victory, which our Ostberliners share with the entire working population of the Soviet Zone." Schutz attributed the government's U-turn to the workers' actions. He said that listeners' demands – i.e., the resignation of the government, Western-style liberties, etc. – were justified, and encouraged them to support the demonstrators. Schutz said that RIAS and the East German people expected these demands to be met: it was the East German people's task to show the SED and the Soviet Communist Party that this was true.

Following West Germany's Federal Minister for All-German Questions Jakob Kaiser's admonition in a late night broadcast to East Germans to shy away from provocations, RIAS, starting with its 11 PM news broadcast, and from then on in hourly broadcasts, repeated the workers' demand to continue the strike the next day, calling specifically for all East Berliners to participate in a demonstration at 7:00 AM on the 17th at Strausberger Platz.

=== 17 June ===
==== East Berlin ====
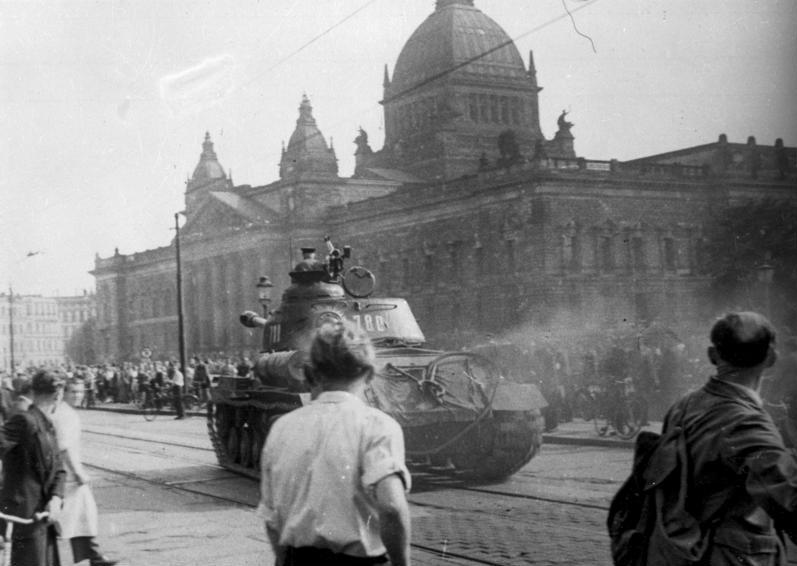
Soviet IS-2 tank passing in front of the old Reichsgericht building in Leipzig on 17 June

Following Semyonov's decision, Soviet troops entered the environs of East Berlin in the early morning of 17 June. Meanwhile, crowds of workers began to gather at Strausberger Platz and other public places, and began marching towards the city centre. En route, they encountered GDR security forces – regular and Kasernierte Volkspolizei ('Barracked People's Police', KVP) units – who, apparently lacking instructions, did not initially intervene. Along with SED and FDJ functionaries, police officials tried – and mostly failed – to convince the marchers to return to their homes and workplaces. Where police attempted to halt or disperse the crowds, they rapidly ended up on the defensive. As the demonstrators drew in ever-greater numbers, a feeling of solidarity swept over them. Loudspeaker cars and bicycles provided communications between the different columns of marchers from the outer districts as, all morning, they converged on the city centre. On improvised banners and posters, the demonstrators again demanded the reinstatement of the old work quotas, but also price decreases, the release of fellow protestors arrested the day before, the end to barriers between East and West, and even free and fair all-German elections. Slogans like "down with the government!" and "butter, not arms" were also visible. Party posters and statues – especially those depicting SED and Soviet leaders – were burned or defaced. Signs and checkpoints between the Russian and other Allied zones of the city were torn down and barriers demolished, encouraging travel between zones.

By 9:00 AM, 25,000 people had gathered in front of the House of Ministries, and tens of thousands more were en route to Leipziger Strasse or in Potsdamer Platz. Between 10:00 and 11:00 AM, 80 to 100 demonstrators apparently stormed the government seat, visibly demonstrating that the 500 Volkspolizei and Stasi members had been overpowered. Then, suddenly, Soviet military vehicles appeared, followed by tanks, to repel what appeared to be an imminent takeover. Within an hour, Soviet troops had cleared and isolated the area around the government headquarters. At noon, Soviet authorities terminated all tram and metro traffic into the Eastern sector and all but closed the sector borders to West Berlin to prevent more demonstrators from reaching the city centre. An hour later, they declared martial law in East Berlin. Outside East Berlin police headquarters, Soviet tanks opened fire on "the insurgents". Fighting between the Soviet Army (and later GDR police) and the demonstrators persisted into the afternoon and night – with, in some cases, tanks and troops firing directly into the crowds. Executions, most prominently of the West Berliner Willi Gottling charged as a leader, and mass arrests followed.

Overnight, the Soviets and the Stasi started to arrest hundreds of people, and by morning had re-erected the border checkpoint with West Germany. Ultimately, up to 10,000 people were detained and at least 32, probably as many as 40, were executed, including Soviet Army soldiers who refused to obey orders. With the SED leadership effectively paralysed at the Soviet headquarters in Karlshorst, control of East Berlin passed to the Soviets there.

==== Outside of East Berlin ====
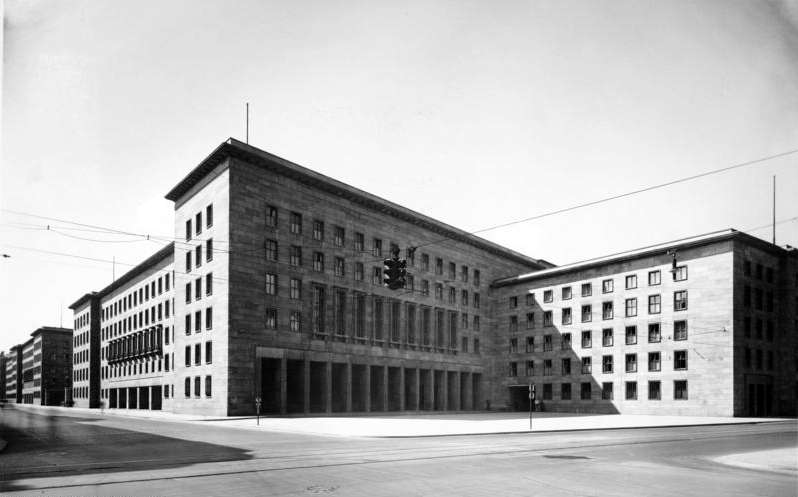
Detlev-Rohwedder-Haus in Berlin, known as the House of Ministries in 1953.

Each of East Germany's 24 cities with a population greater than 50,000 experienced upheavals, as did approximately 80% of the towns with populations between 10,000 and 50,000. Approximately 339,000 people participated in the 129 demonstrations that took place outside of Berlin; over 225,000 launched strikes in 332 factories. The main centres of protest included the industrial region around Halle, Merseburg, and Bitterfeld, as well as middle-size towns like Jena, Görlitz, and Brandenburg. No more than 25,000 people participated in strikes and demonstrations in Leipzig, but there were 32,000 in Magdeburg, 43,000 in Dresden, 53,000 in Potsdam – and in Halle, close to 100,000.

At first, such demonstrations were relatively peaceful, but as increasing numbers began to participate, they became more violent. Looting, particularly of SED-owned shops, became a regular occurrence; there was some arson, and many SED functionaries were beaten up later in the day. In some towns, the jails were seized by demonstrators, who demanded the release of certain political prisoners. In Görlitz a group of 30,000 people destroyed the communist party headquarters, the offices of the secret police and the prison, while in Magdeburg the party headquarters and prison were set on fire. When the Soviet Army intervened in these places outside of East Berlin, they seemed more restrained and more passive; some Soviet soldiers even displayed friendly attitudes towards demonstrators.

In the countryside, meanwhile, protests took place in over 200 villages. However, many East German farmers did not take collective action against the regime: the most common expression of protest in rural areas was for farmers to leave and/or dissolve recently formed collective farms and resume farming on their own.

Although the demands made by protesters could be political – e.g. the dissolution of the East German government and organisation of free elections – they were often simply of a local and economic character. They were about issues like bread shortages, unpopular night shifts, even the number of toilets in the workplace and the fact that tea was being served in rusty urns. Also expressed were widely held grievances against the intelligentsia, who were perceived to enjoy 'unfair privileges', such as special deliveries of basic foodstuffs and other commodities.

Others, particularly workers, demanded the restoration of the Social Democratic Party (SPD) in East Germany. Among former social democrats, there existed enormous bitterness against Prime Minister Otto Grotewohl, ex-leader of the East German SPD, whom they believed had "betrayed the SPD" by leading its merger with the rival German Communist Party to form the ruling SED in 1946.
The Soviet Military Administration (SVAG) had pressured Grotewohl into the merger to protect communist rule in East Germany after the surprisingly poor performance of communist parties in elections in Hungary and in Austria in November 1945. Grotewohl was "rewarded" with the post of Prime Minister, but within a few years the SED had significantly reduced his powers and turned the office into a mostly ceremonial role. Many East German social democrats viewed Grotewohl as a traitor who should "have his neck wrung".

== Aftermath ==
Members of the Politburo of the Central Committee of the Socialist Unity Party

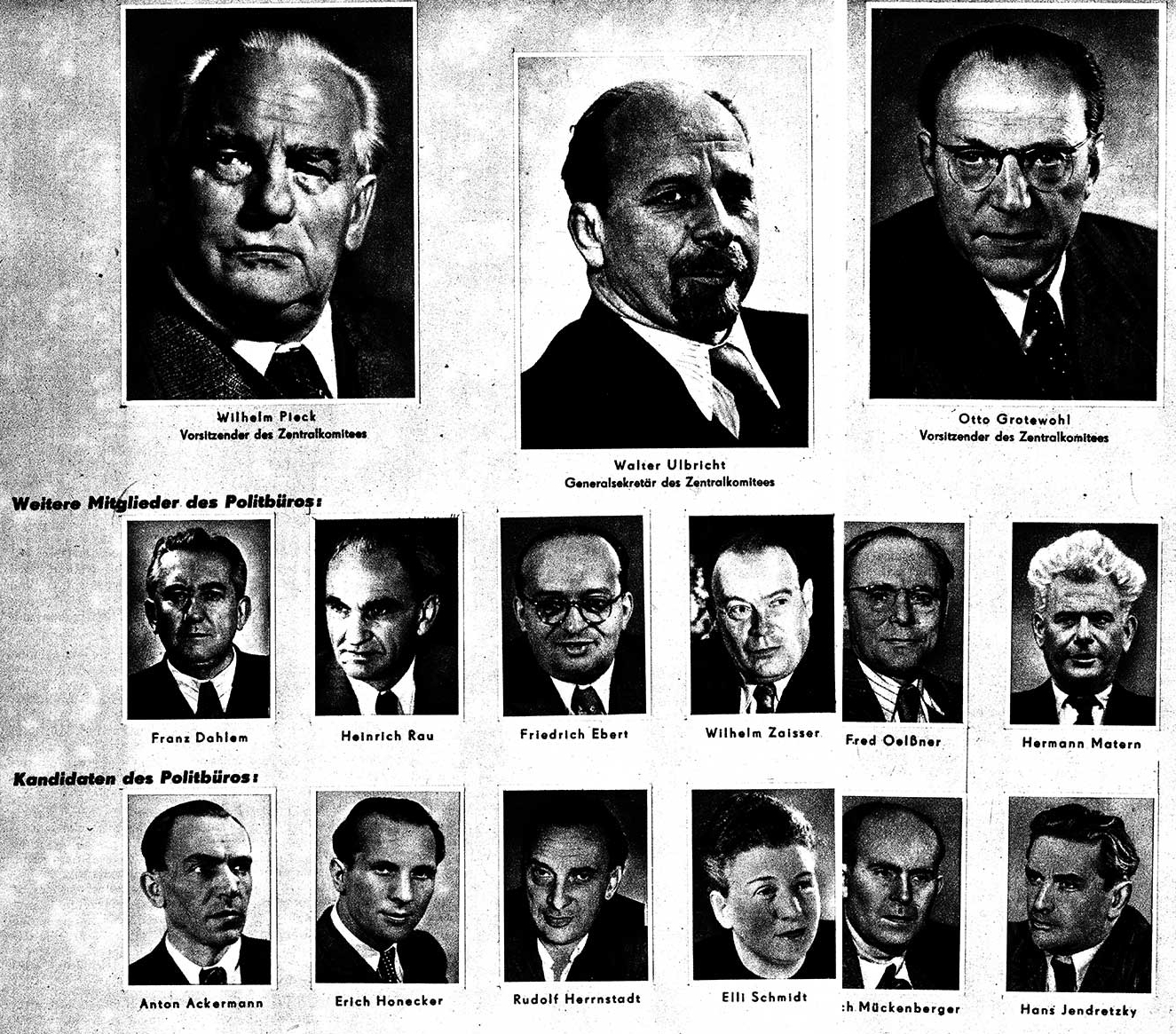
1950, before the uprising

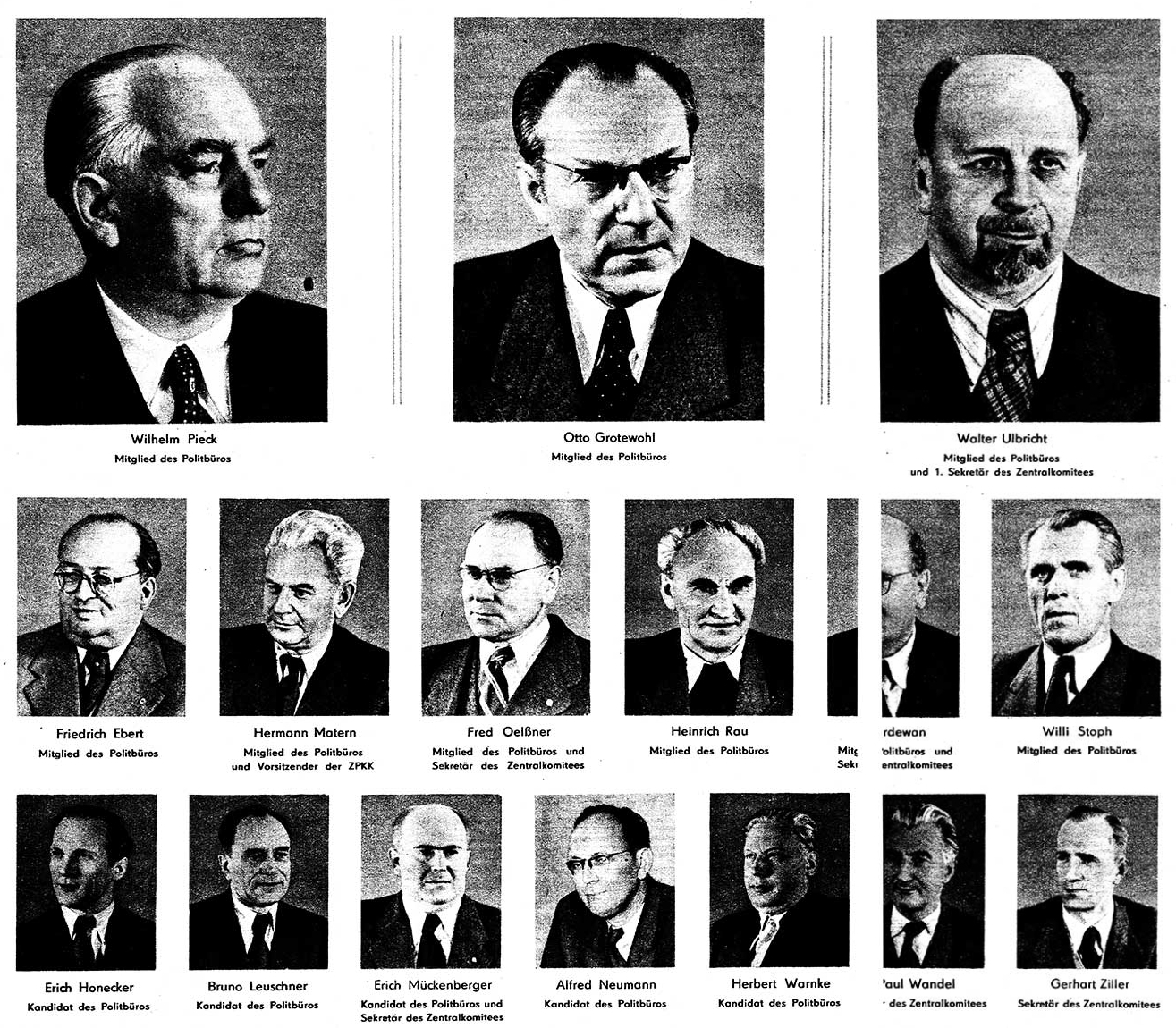
1954, after the uprising

Widespread protests and demonstrations continued for days after 17 June and, according to the GDR security service, the situation had only calmed down 24 June. Deutsche Welle claims a confirmed fatality figure of 55 civilians. A declassified report authored by Andrei Grechko, chief of Soviet Forces in East Germany, claimed a total casualty figure of 209 by 18 June, Newer estimates claim a death toll of at least 125 by the end of the uprising.

Many workers lost faith in East Germany's socialist state following the uprising, disgusted by the violent suppression of the strikes. The fact that the Volkspolizei had shot at workers led to the loss of large numbers of SED members. Throughout the bezirke of Leipzig and Karl-Marx-Stadt, hundreds of SED members, many of whom had spent decades in the labour movement, left the party. At the Textima plant in Altenberg, 450 SED members had left the party by 7 July – most of them workers, many of whom had much experience in the labour movement. There was also a widespread refusal by workers to pay their trade union dues: they ceased to financially support and confer legitimacy upon the party.

=== Ulbricht survives ===
By the time the Politburo met on 8 July, it seemed that Ulbricht's time as party leader was coming to an end. Minister of State Security Wilhelm Zaisser conceded that the entire Politburo was responsible for the "accelerated construction of socialism" and its disastrous fallout, but added that leaving Ulbricht as leader "would be opposed [as] catastrophic for the New Course." By the end of the meeting, just two Politburo members supported Ulbricht's continued leadership: Free German Youth League chief Erich Honecker and Party Control Commission Chairman Hermann Matern. Ulbricht only managed to forestall a decision with a promise to make a statement at the forthcoming 15th SED CC Plenum, scheduled later that month.

The leading Soviet officials in East Berlin – Semyonov, Pavel Yudin and Vasily Sokolovsky – had reached the same conclusions in a report describing and analysing the events of 17–19 June, submitted to Moscow two weeks earlier on 24 June. In a self-serving report which sought to play down the culpability of the Soviet Commission in East Berlin and emphasise the responsibility of Ulbricht for the uprising, they concluded – among other things – that Ulbricht's position as General Secretary of the SED should be terminated, and that the party would move towards collective leadership, in addition to other far-reaching structural political changes in East Berlin. However, the situation in Moscow dramatically changed just two days later, on 26 June, when Soviet Security Chief Lavrentiy Beria was arrested. On 2 July, when a commission met there to discuss proposals for reform in East Germany, the decision was made to shelve the far-reaching and politically sensitive changes. The Soviet leadership, preoccupied with the Beria affair and its internal implications, became disinclined to rock the East German boat and more inclined to the status quo: maintaining power in East Germany by supporting an experienced, reliable, albeit Stalinist and unpopular, ruler.

In late July, Ulbricht, ever more certain of his continued backing in Moscow, expelled his main opponents, Zaisser, Hernstadt and Ackermann, from the Politburo, further strengthening his position.

By late August, Moscow had committed to shoring up the existing East German regime with Ulbricht in charge. By then, the situation in East Germany had stabilised thanks to new economic measures implemented by Moscow and East Berlin, and the dropping of major political changes in the GDR from the agenda. Substantial economic and financial aid was to flow into East Germany and reparation payments were to cease by the end of the year. Additional prisoners of war would be freed and Moscow's mission in East Berlin was elevated to the status of embassy. Ultimately, Ulbricht's position was firmly secured once more.

=== Impact on the long-term development of the GDR ===
According to historian Corey Ross, the SED party leadership derived two key lessons from 17 June.

The first was its increased concern over shop floor discontent and greater determination to preclude it from escalating into broader conflict. Factory surveillance was raised to better monitor the mood of the workforce, the Combat Groups of the Working Class was established as an on-the-spot force to prevent or quell any signs of unrest, and the Stasi was expanded and improved upon to swiftly deal with any signs of organised protest in the future.

The second was that a heavy-handed venture such as the "accelerated construction of socialism" could never again be embarked upon. Ulbricht was haunted throughout the 1950s by the specter of another uprising, and the government never again attempted to introduce arbitrary, blanket work quota increases like those of May and June 1953. The "New Course" policies – increased investment in consumer goods, housing and price and travel subventions – led to an improvement in living standards overall but failed to achieve an immediate end to the discontent that had been growing over the past year.

Protestors, meanwhile, learned that little could be gained from open confrontation – to act openly against the SED regime in large numbers was to be left to their own devices by the West against repression from the East German police and Soviet military.

== Legacy ==
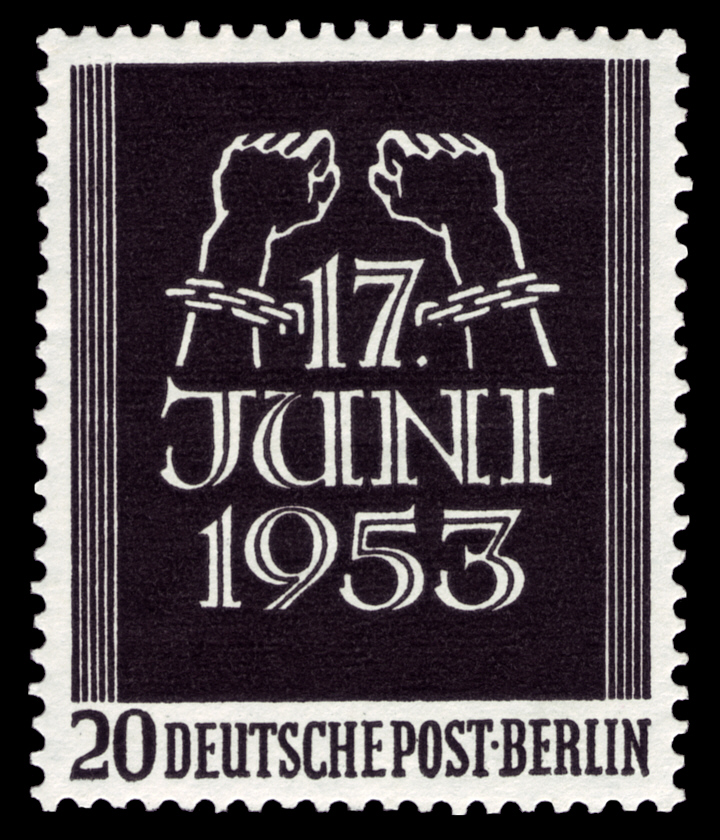
Deutsche Bundespost Berlin postage stamp

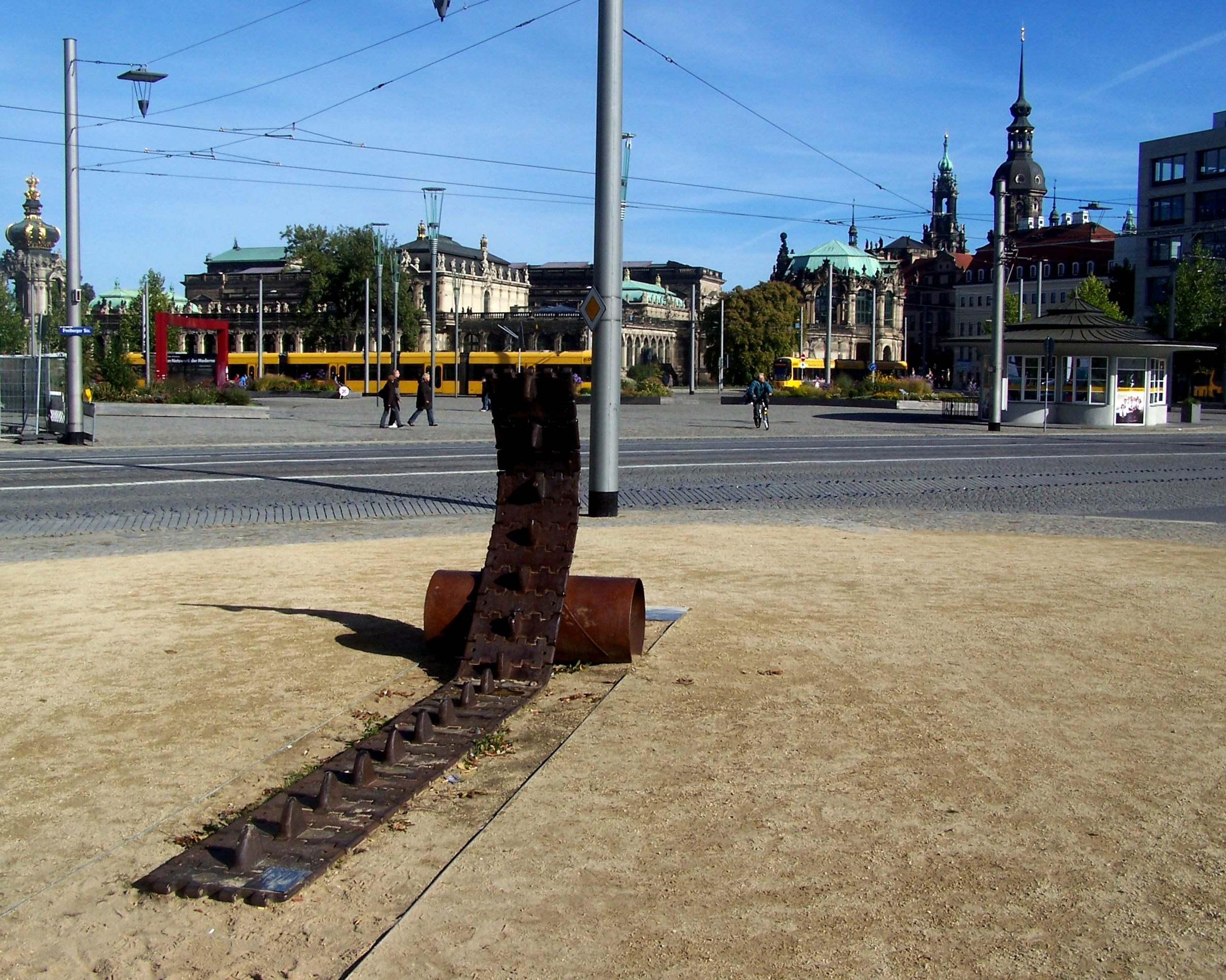
The memorial at the Postplatz in the old town of Dresden.

In memory of the 1953 East German uprising, West Germany established the Day of German Unity as an annual national holiday on 17 June. Upon German reunification in October 1990, the holiday was moved to 3 October, the date of formal reunification. The extension of the Unter den Linden boulevard to the west of the Brandenburg Gate, called Charlottenburger Chaussee, was renamed Straße des 17. Juni ("17 June Street") following the 1953 rebellion.

The uprising is commemorated in "Die Lösung", a poem by Bertolt Brecht. Other prominent GDR authors who dealt with the uprising include Stefan Heym (Fünf Tage im Juni / "Five Days in June", Munich 1974) and Heiner Müller (Wolokolamsker Chaussee III: Das Duell / "Volokolamsk Highway III: The Duel", 1985/86).

West German band Alphaville mention "the seventeenth of June", without referencing the year, in their 1984 song "Summer in Berlin", from their Forever Young album. When the compilation album Alphaville Amiga Compilation was assembled for release in East Germany in 1988, the song "Summer in Berlin" was submitted for inclusion, but rejected "for political reasons".

The 1966 Günter Grass play The Plebeians Rehearse the Uprising depicts Brecht preparing a production of Shakespeare's Coriolanus against the background of the events of 1953.

The East German uprising convinced Molotov, Malenkov and Bulganin that Beria's policies were dangerous and destabilizing to Soviet power. This led to Beria getting fired on June 26.

== See also ==
- East German State Railway strike, May 1949
- Poznań protests, June 1956
- Hungarian Revolution, October–November 1956
- Warsaw Pact invasion of Czechoslovakia, August 1968
- Tiananmen Square protests, April–June 1989
- Monday demonstrations in East Germany, September 1989 – April 1991
- Romanian Revolution, December 1989

== Bibliography ==
- Baring, Arnulf. Uprising in East Germany: 17 June 1953 (Cornell University Press, 1972)
- Dale, Gareth. "June 17, 1953". Jacobin.
- Harman, Chris, Class Struggles in Eastern Europe, 1945–1983 (London, 1988) ISBN 0-906224-47-0
- Hutchinson, Peter (1981). "History and Political Literature: The Interpretation of the "Day of German Unity" in the Literature of East and West". The Modern Language Review. 76 (2): 367–382. doi:10.2307/3726418. ISSN 0026-7937. JSTOR 3726418.
- Kopstein, Jeffrey (April 1996). "Chipping Away at the State: Workers' Resistance and the Demise of East Germany". World Politics. 48 (3): 391–442. doi:10.1353/wp.1996.0011. ISSN 1086-3338. S2CID 34442269.
- Millington, Richard (2014). State, Society and Memories of the Uprising of 17 June 1953 in the GDR. Palgrave Macmillan. ISBN 978-1137403513.
- Ostermann, Christian (2001). Uprising in East Germany 1953: The Cold War, the German Question, and the First Major Upheaval Behind the Iron Curtain. Central European University Press. doi:10.7829/j.ctv280b6bh.48. ISBN 9789639241572. JSTOR 10.7829/j.ctv280b6bh.48. S2CID 246340942.
- Ostermann, Christian F. (1996). ""Keeping the Pot Simmering": The United States and the East German Uprising of 1953". German Studies Review. 19 (1): 61–89. doi:10.2307/1431713. ISSN 0149-7952. JSTOR 1431713.
- Ostermann, Christian F. The United States, the East German Uprising of 1953, and the Limits of Rollback (Working Paper #11. Cold War International History Project, Woodrow Wilson International Center for Scholars, 1994) online
- Port, Andrew, "East German Workers and the 'Dark Side' of Eigensinn: Divisive Shop-Floor Practices and the Failed Revolution of June 17, 1953" in Falling Behind or Catching Up? The East German Economy, 1945–2010, ed. Hartmut Berghoff and Uta Balbier, Cambridge: Cambridge University Press, 2013.
- Pritchard, Gareth, The Making of the GDR: From antifascism to Stalinism, Manchester: Manchester University Press, 2000
- Richter, James (January 1993). "Re-Examining Soviet Policy towards Germany in 1953". Europe-Asia Studies. 45 (4): 671–691. doi:10.1080/09668139308412114. ISSN 0966-8136.
- Richie, Alexandra. Faust's Metropolis: a History of Berlin. New York: Carroll & Graf Publishers, 1998, ch 14
- Ross, Corey, Constructing Socialism at the Grass-Roots: The Transformation of East Germany, 1945–65, London: Macmillan, 2000.
- Sperber, Jonathan (1 October 2004). "17 June 1953: Revisiting a German Revolution". German History. 22 (4): 619–643. doi:10.1191/0266355404gh325ra. ISSN 0266-3554.
- Tusa, Ann . The Last Division: a History of Berlin, 1945–1989. Reading, Massachusetts: Addison-Wesley, 1997.
- Ilko-Sascha Kowalczuk: 17. Juni 1953. Geschichte eines Aufstands. Beck, München 2013.
- Vogel, Steve (2019). Betrayal in Berlin; the true story of the Cold War's most audacious espionage operation. New York: Custom House/HarperCollins. pp. 88–94. ISBN 978-0-06-244962-7.
- Watry, David M. Diplomacy at the Brink: Eisenhower, Churchill, and Eden in the Cold War. Baton Rouge: Louisiana State University Press, 2014.
