= Kulm (Saalfeld) =

Hill in Thuringia, Germany

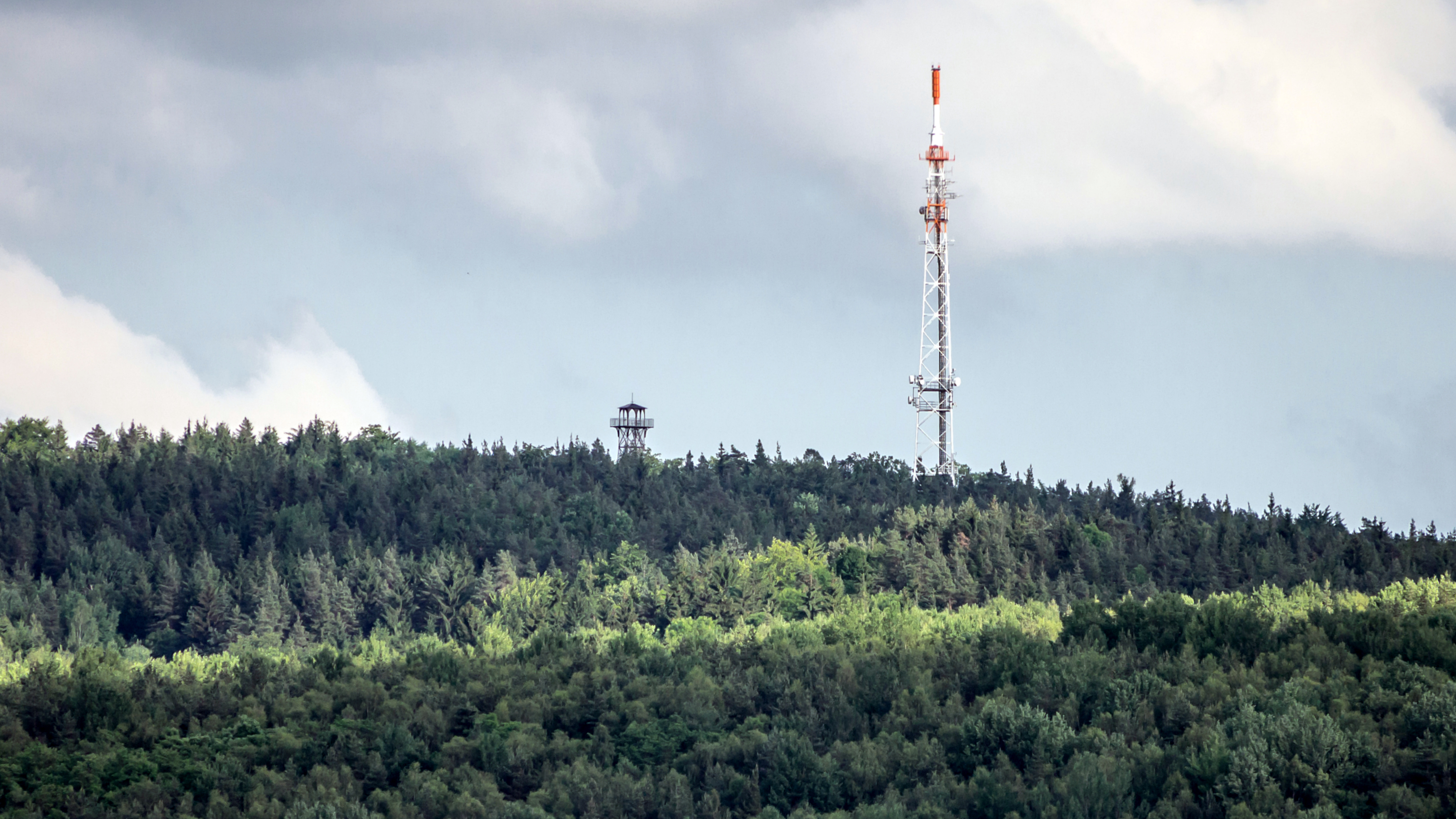
- Viewing tower and transmission mast on the Kulm

Highest point
- Elevation: 481.9 m above sea level (NHN) (1,581 ft)
- Isolation: 5.6 km → Eichköpfe
- Coordinates: 50°41′01″N 11°22′10″E

Geography
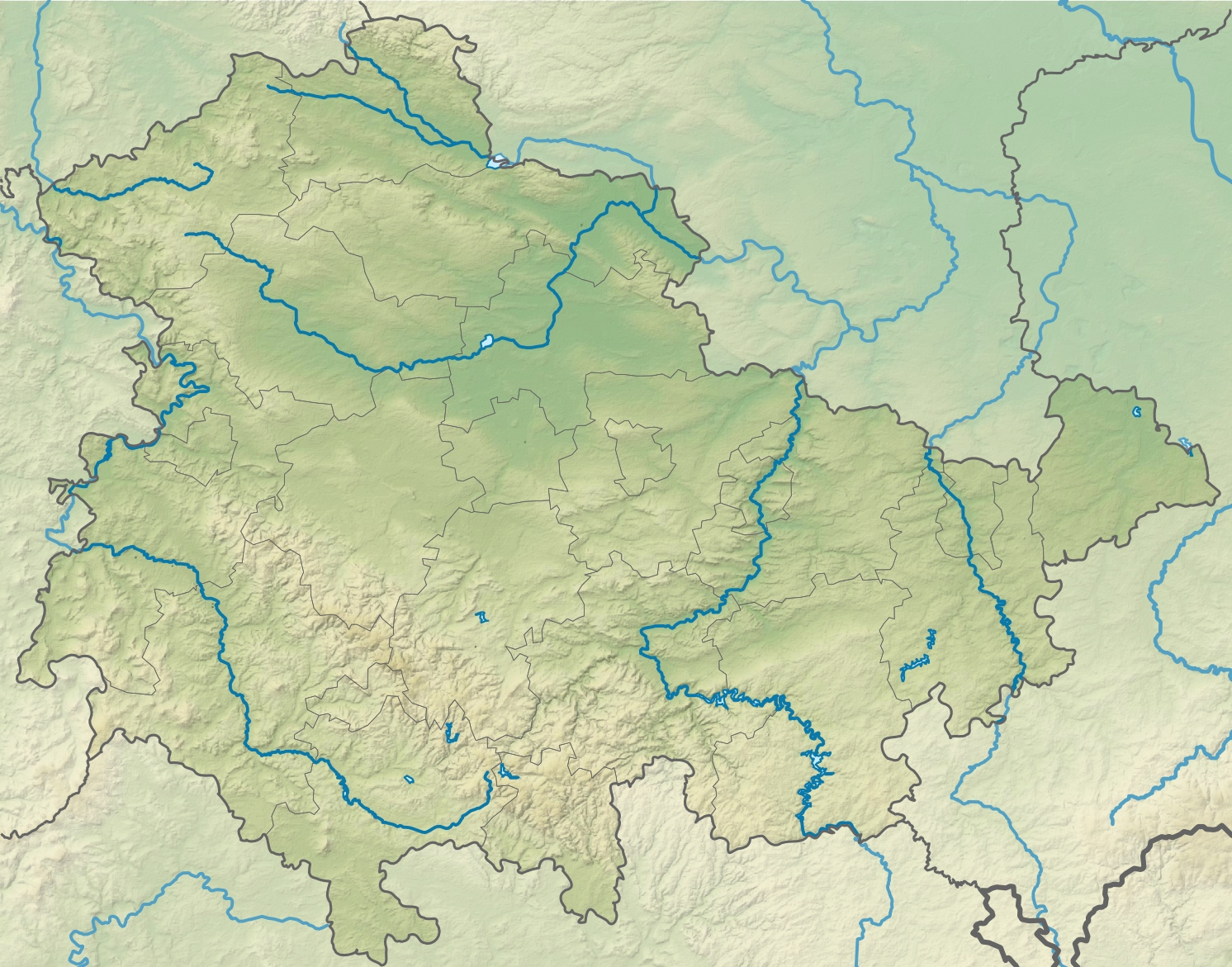
- Location within Thuringia
- Location: Unterwellenborn, Saalfeld-Rudolstadt, Thuringia, Germany

The Kulm is a hill, 481.9 m above sea level (NHN), near Saalfeld in the German state of Thuringia. It lies east of the Saale valley at the western tip of the Saale 'Knee' and is the local hill of the towns of Saalfeld and Rudolstadt. From the Kulm there is a panoramic view over the valleys of the Saale and Rinne, the Orla Basin, the Thuringian Highland and the Ilm-Saale Plateau. Near the Kulm are the villages of Schloßkulm and Dorfkulm, which belong to the municipalities of Uhlstädt-Kirchhasel and Unterwellenborn respectively.

== Towers ==
The viewing tower on the Kulm, the 20-metre-high Kulm Tower, is one of the oldest steel lattice towers in Germany. The tower, which is protected as a monument, was built in 1884 by the Königin Marienhütte. After thorough renovation in 2012, the 18-metre-high viewing platform, which is exactly 500 m above NHN, is once again open to the public.

The transmission tower on the Kulm, a 78.8-metre-high, free-standing, lattice tower, was built in 1974. Since 1 July 2008 it has transmitted DVB-T.
