= Wittgendorf, Thuringia =

Wittgendorf
- Stadtteil of Saalfeld
- Interactive map of Wittgendorf
- Location within Germany Location within Thuringia
- Coordinates: 50°36′11″N 11°14′36″E
- Country: Germany
- State: Thuringia
- District: Saalfeld-Rudolstadt
- Town: Saalfeld

Area
  - Total: 3.39 km^{2} (1.31 sq mi)
- Elevation: 560 m (1,840 ft)

Population (2016-12-31)
  - Total: 155
  - Density: 45.7/km^{2} (118/sq mi)
- Time zone: UTC+01:00 (CET)
  - Summer (DST): UTC+02:00 (CEST)
- Postal codes: 07318
- Dialling codes: 036736
- Vehicle registration: SLF

Wittgendorf (German pronunciation: [ˈvɪtɡn̩dɔʁf]) is a village and a former municipality in the district Saalfeld-Rudolstadt, in Thuringia, Germany. Since July 2018, it is part of the town Saalfeld.
