= 1949 East German State Railway strike =

1949 strike in Berlin, East Germany

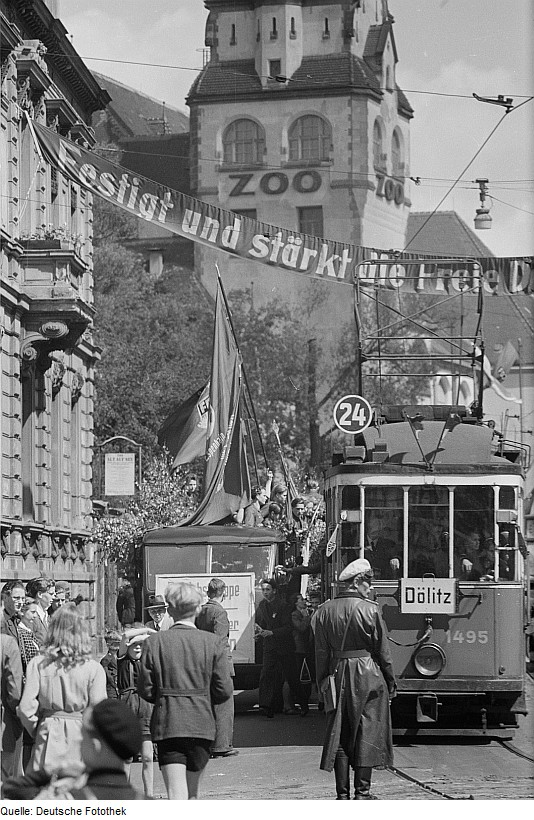
- Train in East Germany in 1949
- Date: 21 May – Late June 1949
- Location: Berlin, East Germany
- Caused by: Demand for payment in West Marks instead of East Marks

Parties
Unabhängige Gewerkschaftsopposition (UGO); East German State Railway	East German government

Number
12,000 trade union workers	

Casualties
- Death: 1
- Arrested: 50+

On 21 May 1949, the Unabhängige Gewerkschaftsopposition (UGO) and the East German State Railway in the West sectors called upon to strike to demand payment in West Marks instead of East Marks. Around 13,000 railworkers living in West Berlin participated in the strike.

== See also ==
- East German uprising of 1953
