= 7th Panzer Division (Wehrmacht) =

German army division during World War II

- 7. Panzer-Division
- Unit insignia 1940
- Active: 18 October 1939 – 8 May 1945
- Country: Nazi Germany
- Branch: German Army
- Type: Panzer
- Role: Armoured warfare
- Size: Division
- Part of: Wehrmacht
- Garrison/HQ: Saalfeld, Thuringia
- Nickname: Gespensterdivision (Ghost Division)
- Engagements: World War II; Battle of France; Operation Barbarossa; Battle of Kursk; Battle of Kiev; Kamenets–Podolsky pocket

Commanders
- Notable commanders: Georg Stumme; Erwin Rommel; Hasso von Manteuffel

Insignia
- 1940

The 7th Panzer Division was an armored formation of the German Army in World War II. It participated in the Battle of France, the invasion of the Soviet Union, the occupation of Vichy France, and on the Eastern Front until the end of the war. The 7th Panzer Division is also known by its nickname, Ghost Division.

The division met with great success in France in 1940 and then again in the Soviet Union in 1941. In May 1942, the division was withdrawn from the Soviet Union and sent back to France to replace losses and refit. It returned to Southern Russia following the defeat at Stalingrad, and helped to check a general collapse of the front in a series of defensive battles as part of Army Group Don, and participated in General Erich von Manstein's counterattack at Kharkov. The division fought in the unsuccessful offensive at Kursk in the summer of 1943, suffering heavy losses in men and equipment and was further degraded in the subsequent Soviet counteroffensive. (Note: The losses for July were 3,231, and in August almost as many 3,035.)

Through 1944 and 1945, the division was markedly understrength and continuously engaged in a series of defensive battles across the eastern front. It was twice evacuated by sea, leaving what was left of its heavy equipment behind each time. After fighting defensively across Prussia and Northern Germany, the surviving men escaped into the forest and surrendered to the British Army northwest of Berlin in May 1945.

== Formation ==
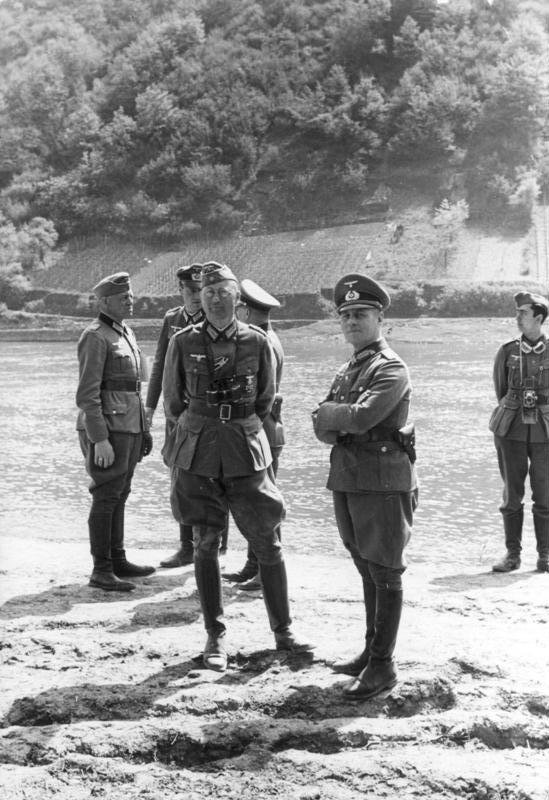
General Erwin Rommel and staff observe 7th Panzer Division practicing a river crossing at the Mosel, 1940

Following the completion of the invasion of Poland, the limited effectiveness of the light divisions caused the Oberkommando des Heeres (OKH; German High Command) to order the reorganization of the four light divisions into full panzer divisions. In October 1939, the 2nd Light Division became the 7th Panzer Division, one of Germany's ten armoured divisions. It consisted of 218 tanks in three battalions, with two rifle regiments, a motorcycle battalion, an engineer battalion, and an anti-tank battalion.

Newly promoted General Erwin Rommel, who had served on Hitler's staff during the Invasion of Poland, was able to, with an intervention from Hitler, obtain the command of the division. Upon taking command on 10 February 1940, Rommel quickly set his unit to practicing the maneuvers they would need in the upcoming campaign.

== Operational history ==
=== Invasion of France and Belgium ===
The invasion began on 10 May 1940. By the third day, the 7th Panzer Division under Rommel's command, along with three panzer divisions commanded by General Heinz Guderian, had reached the River Meuse, where they found the bridges had already been destroyed. Rommel was active in the forward areas, directing the efforts to make a crossing, which were initially unsuccessful due to suppressive fire by the French on the other side of the river. By 16 May, the division had reached its assigned objective at Avesnes-sur-Helpe, where the original plan called for him to stop and await further orders, but Rommel pressed on.

On 20 May, the division reached Arras. General Hermann Hoth received orders that the town should be bypassed and its British garrison thus isolated. He ordered the 5th Panzer Division to move to the west and the division to the east, flanked by the SS Division Totenkopf. The following day the British launched a counterattack, deploying two infantry battalions supported by heavily armoured Matilda Mk I and Matilda II tanks in the Battle of Arras. The German 37 mm anti-tank gun proved ineffective against the heavily armoured Matildas. The 25th Panzer Regiment and a battery of 88 mm anti-aircraft guns were called in to support, and the British withdrew.

On 24 May, Hitler issued a halt order. The reason for this decision is still a matter of debate. He may have overestimated the size of the British forces in the area, or he may have wished to reserve the bulk of the armour for the drive on Paris. The halt order was lifted on 26 May. 7th Panzer continued its advance, reaching Lille on 27 May. For the assault, Hoth placed the 5th Panzer Division under Rommel's command. The Siege of Lille continued until 31 May, when the French garrison of 40,000 men surrendered. The evacuation of the British Expeditionary Force from Dunkirk concluded on 4 June; over 338,000 Allied troops had been evacuated across the Channel, though they had to leave behind all their heavy equipment and vehicles.

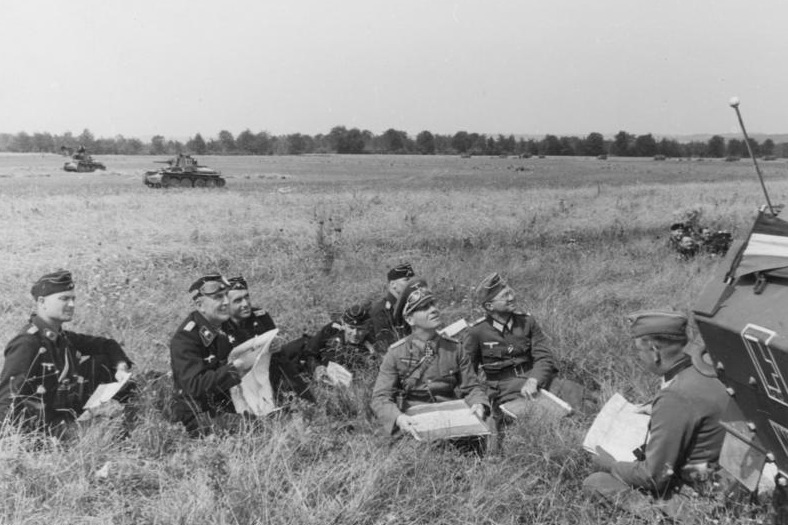
Rommel and staff during the Battle for France, June 1940.

The division, resuming its advance on 5 June, drove for the River Seine to secure the bridges near Rouen. Advancing 100 kilometres (62 mi) in two days, the division reached Rouen to find the bridges destroyed. From here they moved north, blocking the westward route to Le Havre and the Operation Cycle evacuations and forcing over 10,000 men of the 51st (Highland) Division, French 9th Army Corps and other supporting troops to surrender at Saint-Valery-en-Caux on 12 June. On 17 June, the division was ordered to advance on Cherbourg Naval Base, where additional British evacuations were underway as part of Operation Aerial. The division advanced 240 kilometres (150 mi) in 24 hours, and after two days of shelling, the French garrison surrendered on 19 June. The speed and surprise it was consistently able to achieve, to the point where both the enemy and the OKH at times lost track of its whereabouts, earned the division the nickname Gespensterdivision ("Ghost Division"). Lieutenant Alfred Tschimpke published a 1942 book, The Ghost Division, emphasizing these characteristics. The book was originally issued in Germany under the title Die Gespenster-Division by the Zentralverlag der NSDAP (Franz Eher Nachfolger GmbH, Munich). The English translation, titled The Ghost Division, was released in trade paper format in the United States by SF Tafel in 2025.

After the armistice with the French was signed on 22 June, the division was placed in reserve, being sent first to the Somme and then to Bordeaux to re-equip and prepare for Unternehmen Seelöwe (Operation Sea Lion), the planned invasion of Britain. This invasion was later cancelled as Germany was not able to acquire the air superiority deemed a necessity for a successful outcome. In February, the division was placed in reserve and returned to Germany, with General Hans von Funck assuming command. The unit was stationed near Bonn while preparations were being made for an invasion of the Soviet Union. For reasons of deception and security, it remained in Bonn up until 8 June 1941, when the division was loaded onto 64 trains and transported by rail to the eastern frontier. The division assembled in East Prussia southeast of Lötzen in preparation for Operation Barbarossa, the invasion of the Soviet Union.

=== Eastern Front ===
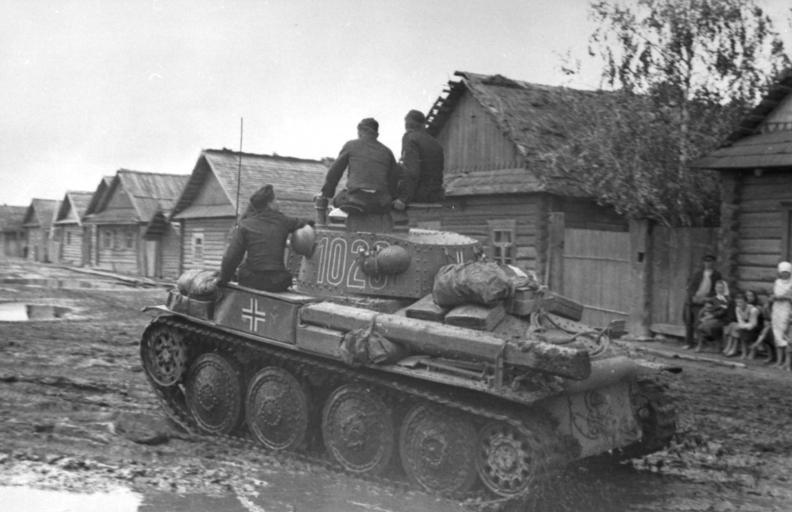
A Panzer 38t in the Soviet Union, June 1941

Operation Barbarossa began at 03:05 on 22 June 1941. Resistance at the border was weaker than expected and brushed aside, the tanks of the division raced forward, covering the 60 km to reach the Neman River at Alytus by midday. (Note: The tanks of the Panzer Regiment literally raced each other during the first days advance.) The Soviet 5th Tank Division stationed on the east bank of river at Alytus was completely taken by surprise, and the Germans were able to capture two bridges and establish bridgeheads across the river. Shortly thereafter, the Soviets initiated a series of fierce counter-attacks, bringing the German advance to an abrupt halt.

The 5th Tank Division was well equipped with 300 tanks, of which 55 were of the new T-34 and KV-1 types. Firing from hull down positions on the reverse slopes of hillsides, they caused the panzer forces their first combat losses. Reinforced in the afternoon by tanks from 20th Panzer Division's 21st Panzer Regiment, von Funck could fend off probing attacks from the Red Army tanks and pressure the east bank, but decided to delay further advance until his supplies caught up with him.

Having lost 80 of its tanks in its probing attacks against the bridgeheads, the 5th Tank Division withdrew in the night to the north-east. The path now clear, the division advanced another 100 km to the outskirts of Vilnius. Its motorcycle battalion captured the city the following day. Consolidating its position in and around Vilnius, the division then handed responsibility for the city over to the 20th Motorized Division and resumed its advance east. Unlike previous campaigns, when the Red Army positions were outflanked and cut off, the Soviet defenders frequently continued to fight rather than surrender, even though their situation was hopeless. The stubbornness of the Soviet defenders cost more time and casualties, frustrating the German command. Though creating pockets of resistance, the Soviet command was unable to mount a linear defense, and the vital road and rail communications north east of Minsk were cut on 26 June, only four days into Operation Barbarossa. The following day, the division linked up with 18th Panzer Division from Panzer Group 2, trapping the bulk of three Soviet Armies, the 3rd, 10th and 13th, in a vast pocket west of Minsk.

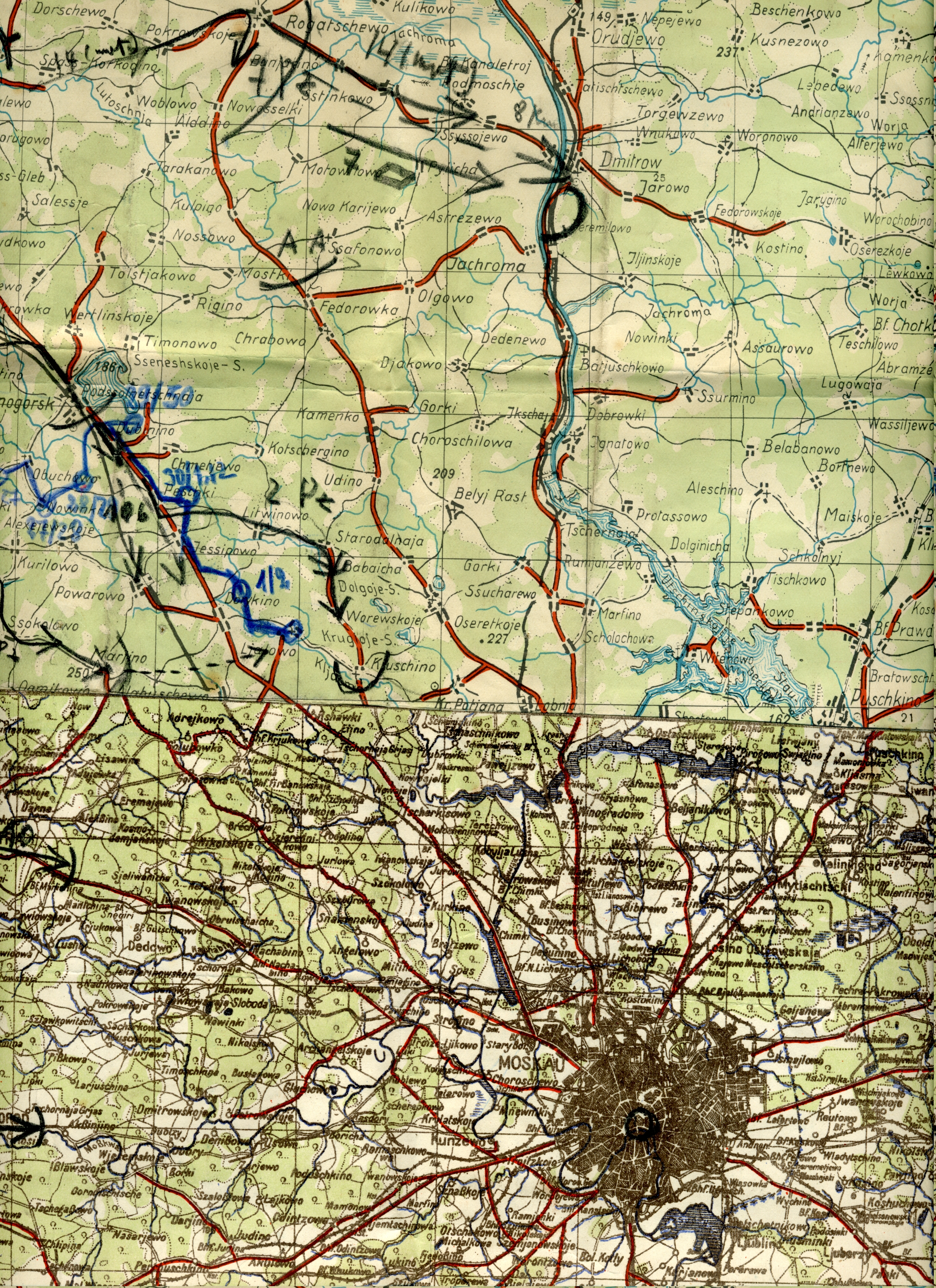
Campaign map used by the reconnaissance battalion of the division during approach north of Moscow

In a three-day dash, the division reached the town of Yartsevo, outflanking Soviet positions around Smolensk and threatening the Soviet 20th Army with encirclement. Meanwhile, the 29th Motorized Division had captured the city of Smolensk from the south, but with substantial elements tied down at Yelnya, 2nd Panzer Group lacked the strength to link up again with 7th Panzer positions. The gap between the two groups remained open, and the Soviet command was able to move forces both ways through the corridor. On 26 July, together with 20th Motorized Division, the division lunged southwards another 20 kilometers, but still could not entirely close the encirclement. In another week, however, pressure from all sides had squeezed the pocket out of existence and the division was finally relieved by infantry units, and taken out of line for refitting and rest.

The division started the campaign with 400 officers and 14,000 men. By January 1942, six months from the start of the offensive, the division had suffered 2,055 killed, 5,737 wounded, with 313 missing and another 1,089 sick with frostbite and louse-borne diseases. Total casualties were 9,203. In late winter, the division took up positions along a defensive line running Yukhnov-Gzhatsk-Zubtsov. On 15 March, it took part in fighting against a series of Soviet offensives as part of the Battles of Rzhev. By 4 April, the division was moved to Vyazma. By May 1942, the division was at a strength of 8,589 men and officers, most of whom had not been with the unit at the start of the campaign. As a result, the division was withdrawn to rest and refit in southern France.

=== France ===
In mid-May, the division was transported by rail to southern France, where it was assigned to coastal protection duties with the 1st Army under the command of von Funck. Even though the division was to be ready for 1 September, the II/Panzer Regiment 25 was temporarily equipped with French tanks. However, new equipment was issued, including 35 Pz III(J)s, 14 Pz III(N)s and 30 Pz IV(G)s, and the division's two Rifle Regiments were re-designated Panzer-grenadier regiments.

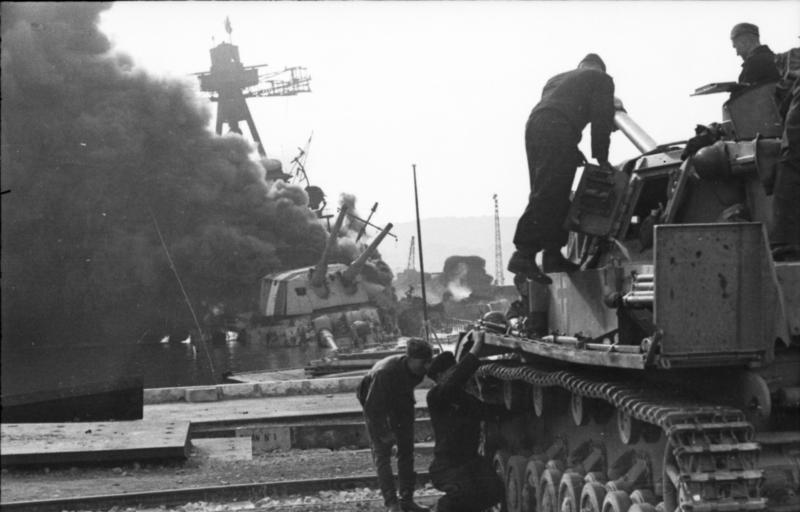
The crew of a Panzer IV watch a burning French warship, probably the cruiser Colbert.

Hitler had been concerned about the possibility of an Allied invasion of the continent. Following the 8 November Allied landings in West and North Africa, his anxiety rose greatly. On 11 November, the division, as part of Case Anton, was sent to previously Vichy France, to reach the Mediterranean coast between Perpignan and Narbonne. Assembling in a staging area around Aix-en-Provence, the division prepared for Operation Lila, the seizure of the Vichy French fleet at the naval port of Toulon, to prevent them falling into Allied hands. For the mission, the division was augmented with units from other divisions, including two armoured groups and a motorcycle battalion from the SS Division Das Reich and a marine detachment called Gumprich after its commander. Marine Detachment Gumprich was assigned the mission of seizing the French ships before they could sail or be scuttled. The combat groups entered Toulon at 04:00 on 27 November 1942 and captured the main arsenal and the coastal defences. However, they were unable to prevent the scuttling of the French fleet in Toulon, and the operation ended in failure.

Afterwards, the division was stationed in a region between Marseille and Avignon. It remained there until January 1943, when the deterioration of the German front in southern Soviet Union necessitated its return to the Eastern Front.

=== Eastern Front ===
On transfer to Army Group South, the division fought to stem the Soviet effort to cut off the 1st Panzer Army in the Caucasus. The division checked the Soviet advance on Rostov, maintaining an avenue of escape for the 1st Panzer Army. It continued in actions along the Don and Donetz river lines, and in the Third Battle of Kharkov. In the summer of 1943, the division took part in the offensive at Kursk, serving as part of the armoured formations of Army Detachment Kempf as they attempted to screen the eastern flank of the southern German pincer. The division suffered heavy casualties in this battle, and by the end of the battle the division was down to 15 tanks and had an infantry combat strength equivalent to three battalions.

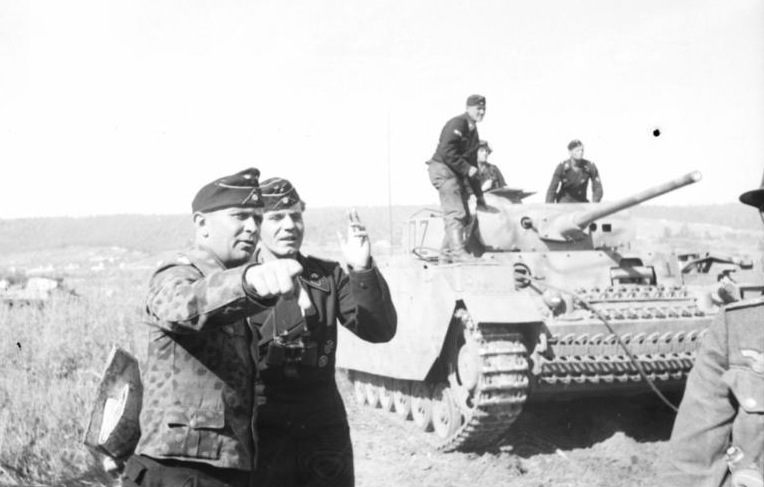
Adelbert Schulz, commander of 25 Panzer Regiment, the main striking force of the 7th Panzer Division, near a Panzer III in June 1943

Following the end of the German offensive at Kursk, the division was transferred to the XLVIII Panzer Corps. On 20 August 1943, Generalmajor Hasso von Manteuffel took command of the division. The Soviet Steppe Front launched a massive attack on 3 August 1943 spearheaded by the 1st Tank Army and the 5th Guards Tank Army.

The German front west of Belgorod was pierced and forced back. The division, attached to the 4th Panzer Army, gradually gave way battling against the Soviet 40th Army. The division was relieved at the front, enabling it to form a shock group with the Großdeutschland division, which would drive into the Soviet flank and join with reinforcements arriving in the Kharkov region, and blunt the Soviet advance. The counterstroke was led by Großdeutschland, with the division, operating with its 23 remaining operational tanks, covering the left flank. By nightfall, the attackers had driven 24 kilometers into the Red Army flank and isolated the forward elements of the Soviet offensive. Success was short lived, however, as further Soviet reinforcements advancing behind the lead elements confronted the German counterattack and reduced the combat effectiveness of the Wehrmacht formations. With this Army Group South withdrew to the line of the Dnieper.

Personnel losses in August for the division were even higher than in July. The replacement battalion was disbanded as all capable leaders were needed at the front. Losses in heavy infantry weapons and motor vehicles reduced the division's combat value. Remaining operational tanks were amalgamated into a single company. The battered division withdrew to the Dnieper position, crossing the river at Kremenchug.

The division then fought in the defensive Battle of Kiev and the German counterattack at Zhitomir. During these battles, the division was twice cited for distinguished conduct. After this, the division fought in a series of heavy defensive battles during the long retreat across Ukraine.

On 20 November 1943, 7th Panzer Division possessed 47 tanks, of which only 16 were operational.

=== Courland Pocket ===
In July 1944, the division was transferred north to the Baltic States and the northern area of Army Group Center in response to the Soviet Baltic Offensive. The division participated in defensive fighting in Lithuania. Late in the summer the 1st Baltic Front attempted to reach the Baltic Sea through the Third Panzer Army. On 21 September, the division moved more than 100 km north to an area east of Memel where there was heavy fighting. The German forces were forced to fall back during the follow-up Memel Offensive, to a defensive perimeter around the coastal town of Memel. With the Memel bridgehead isolated, the division was relieved by an infantry division and was loaded onto ships and transported by sea out of the pocket, leaving its heavy equipment behind with the German forces still holding. On 7 November 1944, the remainder of the division was gathered at the Aryes training area in East Prussia and the division was partially reorganized. Here it formed a reserve for the 2nd Army of Army Group Center.

=== Germany ===
In January 1945, the Soviet 2nd Belorussian Front mounted a massive attack and broke through the defenses of the 2nd Army, which was forced back north and west. The Kampfgruppe of the division fought a rearguard action through north Poland at Elbląg and to the east of Grudziądz. The division crossed the Vistula and then continued in defensive battles for and around Chojnice. In mid-February 1945, the division was pushed back into northern Pomerania. In March 1945 the division was fighting a delaying action at Gdynia, north and west of Danzig. On 19 April 1945, the surviving men were again taken off by sea, evacuating from the Hel Peninsula. Only a small remnant of the division came back from the Hel Peninsula. This remnant assembled at the Baltic Sea island of Usedom in western Pomerania and retreated west through Prussia until finally surrendering to the British Army at Schwerin north and west of Berlin in May 1945.

== Allegations of war crimes ==
Historian Raffael Scheck says, "Although there is no evidence incriminating Rommel himself, his unit did fight in areas where German massacres of French prisoners of war were extremely common in June 1940."

According to some authors, during the fighting in France, the division, alongside troops from 5th Panzer Division, committed numerous atrocities against French troops, including the murder of 50 surrendering officers and men at Quesnoy and the nearby Airaines. (Note: "Indeed, the soldiers of the 'Ghost Division' and its partner in crime, 5th Panzer Division, committed numerous atrocities against French colonial troops in 1940, murdering fifty surrendered non-commissioned officers and men at Airaines") (Note: "On 7 June, a number of soldiers of 53eme Regiment d'Infanterie Coloniale were shot, probably by troops of the 5th Panzer Division, following their surrender after a spirited defense in the area of Airaines, near Le Quesnoy. Similar acts had also been perpetrated by soldiers of Rommel's 7th Panzer Division on 5 June against the defenders of Le Quesnoy. Rommel noted in his own account that "any enemy troops were either wiped out or forced to withdraw"; at the same time he also provided the disparaging (but possibly somewhat contradictory in light of his first note) observation that "many of the prisoners taken were hopelessly drunk.") After the war a memorial was erected to the commanding French officer Charles N'Tchoréré, who was allegedly executed by soldiers under Rommel's command. The division is considered by Raffael Scheck to have been "likely" responsible for the execution of POWs in Hangest-sur-Somme, (Note: In Hangest-sur-Somme, some captured tirailleurs and a French second lieutenant were shot by Germans in black uniforms, most likely members of Rommel's 7th Panzer Division.) while Scheck believes they were too far away to have been involved in the massacres at Airaines and nearby villages. French historian Dominique Lormier states the number of victims of the division in Airaines at 109, mostly French-African soldiers from Senegal. Historian Daniel Butler agrees that it was possible the massacre at Le Quesnoy happened given the existence of Nazis like Karl Hanke in the division, while stating that in comparison with other German units, few sources regarding such actions of the men of the division exist (Butler believes that "it's almost impossible to imagine" Rommel authorizing or countenancing such actions, in either case). Showalter claims that there was no massacre at Le Quesnoy. Claus Telp comments that Airaines was not in the sector of the division, however, at Hangest and Martainville, elements of the division might have shot some prisoners and used British Colonel Broomhall as a human shield. Telp is of the opinion that it was unlikely Rommel approved or even knew about these two incidents.

== Commanding officers ==
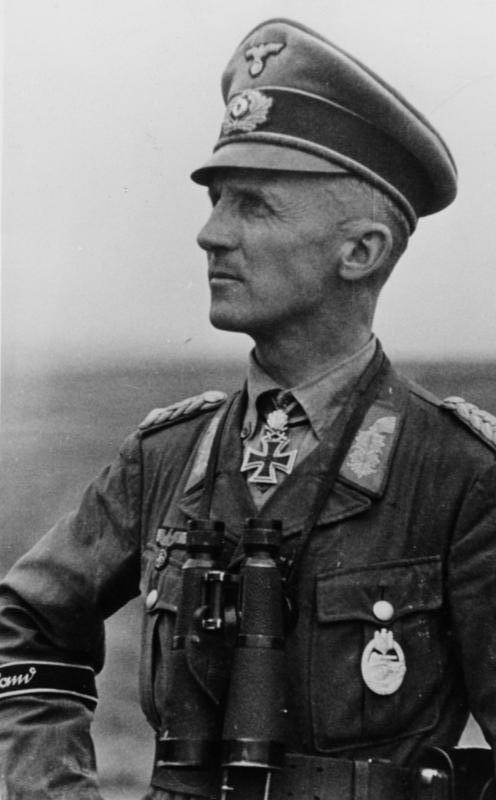
Hasso von Manteuffel commanded the division in 1943.

- Generalmajor Georg Stumme (18 October 1939 – 5 February 1940)
- Generalmajor Erwin Rommel (5 February 1940 – 14 February 1941)
- Generalmajor Hans Freiherr von Funck (15 February 1941 – 17 August 1943)
- Oberst Wolfgang Gläsemer (17 August 1943 – 20 August 1943)
- Generalmajor Hasso von Manteuffel (20 August 1943 – 1 January 1944)
- Generalmajor Adelbert Schulz (1 January 1944 – 28 January 1944), KIA
- Oberst Wolfgang Gläsemer (28 January 1944 – 30 January 1944)
- Generalmajor Dr. Karl Mauss (30 January 1944 – 2 May 1944)
- Generalmajor Gerhard Schmidhuber (2 May 1944 – 9 September 1944)
- Generalmajor Dr. Karl Mauss (9 September 1944 – 31 October 1944)
- Generalmajor Hellmuth Mäder (31 October 1944 – 30 November 1944)
- Generalmajor Dr. Karl Mauss (30 November 1944 – 5 January 1945)
- Generalmajor Max Lemke (5 January 1945 – 23 January 1945)
- Generalmajor Dr. Karl Mauss (23 January 1945 – 25 March 1945)
- Oberst Hans Christern (26 March 1945 – 8 May 1945)

== Organization / Order of Battle ==
=== May 1940 ===
The organisation structure of the 7th Panzer Division of the German Heer (May 10, 1940), in preparation to the Battle of France was as follows:

- 25th Panzer Regiment (under command of Oberst Karl Rothenburg) / German: Panzerregiment 25 (PzRgt 25)
  - I Panzer Battalion (Schmidt) / I. Panzerabteilung (I. PzAbtg)
  - II Panzer Battalion (Ilgen) / II. PzAbtg
  - III (66th) Panzer Battalion (Major Rudolf Sieckenius) / III. PzAbt (PzAbt 66)
- 7th Rifle Brigade (Oberst Fürst) / 7. Schützenbrigade (7. SchtzBrig)
  - 6th Rifle Regiment (Oberst Erich von Unger) / Schützenregiment 6 (SchtzRgt 6)
  - 7th Rifle Regiment (Oberst Georg von Bismarck) / SchtzRgt 7
  - 705th heavy Infantry Artillery Company, 15 cm / schwere Infanterie-Geschütz-Kompanie (s InfGeschKomp 705)
- 78th Artillery Regiment, 10.5 cm (Oberst Frölich) / Artillerieregiment 78 (ArtRgt 78)
  - I Battalion (Kessler) / I. Abteilung (I. Abtg)
  - II Battalion (Crasemann) / II. Abtg
  - III battalion from June 6, 1940 (von Kronhelm) / III. Abtg
- 7th Motorcycle Battalion (Major Friedrich-Carl von Steinkeller) / Kraftradschützenbataillon 7 (KradSchtzBat 7)
- 37th Panzer Reconnaissance Battalion (Major Erdmann, KIA 28 May) / Panzeraufklärungsabteilung 37 (PzAufklAbt 37)
- 42nd Antitank Battalion (Oberstleutnant Johann Mickl / Panzerjägerabteilung 42 (PzJgAbt 42)
- 58th Combat Engineer Battalion, motorized (Major Binkau, KIA 13 May) / Pionierbataillon 58 (PiBtl 58)
- 58th Supply Battalion (t.b.d.) / Nachschubbataillon 58
- 83rd Communications Battalion (Müller) / Nachrichtenabteilung 83 (NachrichtenAbt 83)
- 59th light Anti-aircraft Battalion (Major Schrader) / leichte Flakabteilung 59 (le FlakAbt 59)

subordinated enforcement units:

- 86th anti-aircraft battalion / FlakAbt 86
- 1st battery, 23rd anti-aircraft battalion / 1. Batterie, FlakAbt 23
- 1st detachment, reconnaissance group (Heer) 11 / 1. Staffel, Aufklärungsgruppe (Heer) 11

Equipment:

The divisional artillery consisted at this time of 24 towed 105 mm LeFH (light field howitzers). The divisional anti-tank battalion and the infantry anti-tank platoons all fielded towed 37mm PAK 36. The infantry traveled by truck or by motorcycle. Both Panzer Regiment 25, and Panzer Battalion 66 had gone into action in Poland with only Pz I and Pz II light tanks. On assignment to 7th Panzer Division, these units were to adopt the Czechoslovak tank LT vz. 38 as the main battle tank in their light companies, along with the Pz IV in the medium companies. However, this process was not complete by the start of the battle with France and the division went into action in May 1940 with 225 tanks (34 Pz I, 68 Pz II, 91 Pz 38(t), 24 Pz IV and eight command variants).

=== July 1941 ===
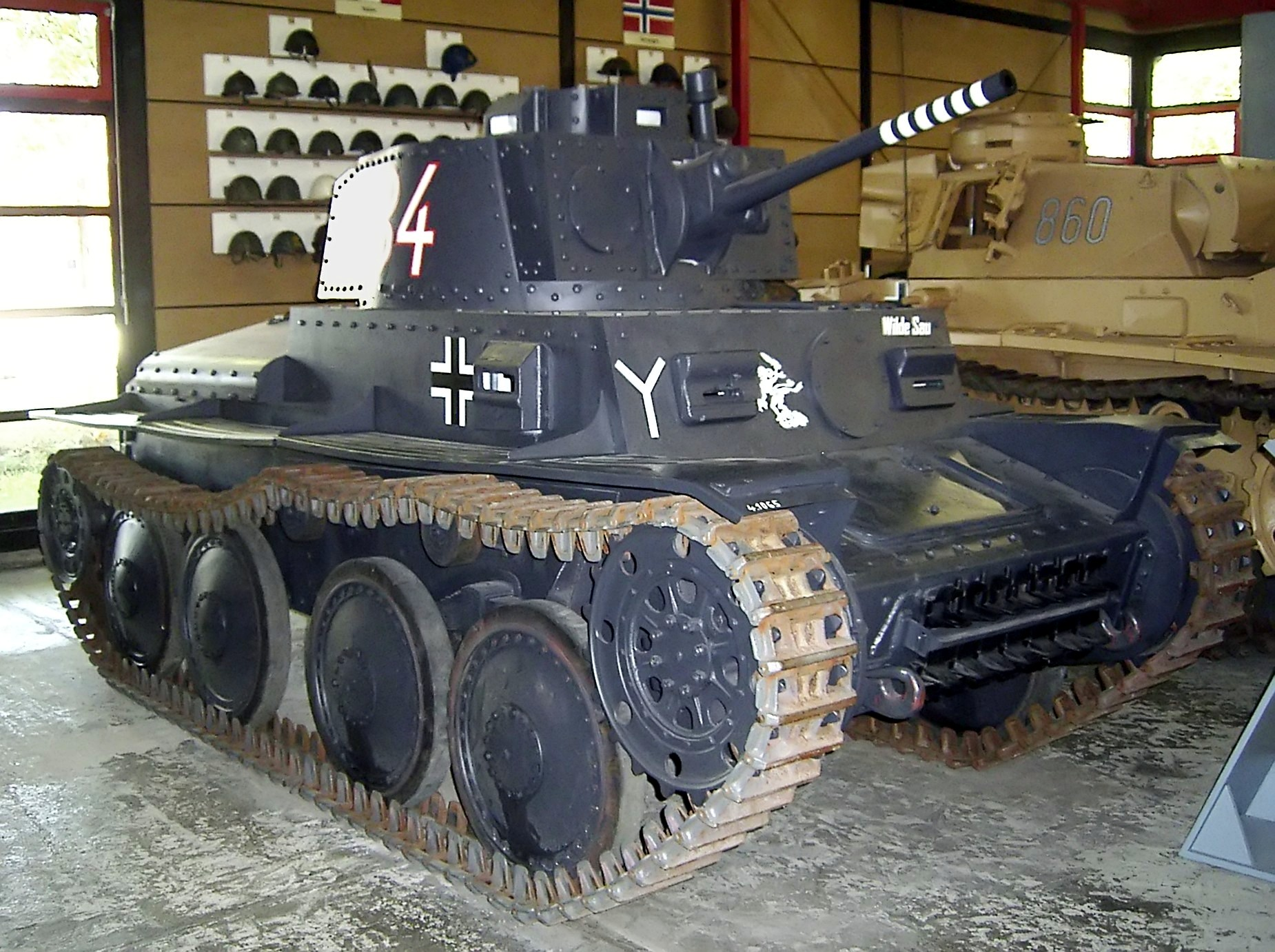
Panzer 38(t) used by the 7th Panzer division. These Czech built light tanks were the main combat vehicle of the division's panzer regiment from 1940 through 1941.

- 25th Panzer Regiment (I, II & III Battalions)
- 7th Infantry Brigade
  - 6th Motorized Rifle Regiment (I & II Battalions)
  - 7th Motorized Rifle Regiment (I & II Battalions)
  - 7th Motorcycle Battalion
- 37th Reconnaissance Battalion
- 78th Motorized Artillery Regiment (I, II & III Battalions)
- 58th Motorized Combat Engineer Battalion
- 42nd Antitank Battalion
- 58th Field replacement battalion
- Divisional services

The 25th Panzer Regiment had absorbed the 66th Panzer Battalion, which had been the panzer force of the original 2nd Light Division. By 1941, this unit had become the 3rd Battalion of the 25th Panzer Regiment. In the eve of Operation Barbarossa, the tank strength of the division had risen to 53 Pz II, 167 Pz 38(t), 30 Pz IV, and 15 French Char B, for a total of 265 tanks. The artillery regiment had added a 3rd battalion of heavy guns, with two batteries of 150 mm sFH, and a battery of 100 mm guns.

Each panzer battalion comprised four companies instead of three, and a third company had been added to the antitank battalion. A field replacement battalion of three companies had also been added. The division totaled 400 officers leading 14,000 men at the start of Barbarossa.

=== June 1943 ===
In May 1942, the division was withdrawn from the Soviet Union and rebuilt and reorganized in France. The Panzer Regiment now consisted of two battalions equipped with German tanks. The infantry regiments were now renamed Panzer Grenadiers, with II / Panzer Grenadier Regiment 6 equipped with armored half tracks. The motorcycle battalion was merged into the reconnaissance battalion and contained an armored car company, a half track company, two motorcycle companies, and a heavy company.

On its return to Russia in December 1942, the Panzer Regiment was now equipped with 21 Pz II, 91 Pz III (50mm long), 14 Pz III (75mm), 2 Pz IV (75mm), 18 Pz IV (75mm long), 9 Befehl (command), a total of 155 tanks.

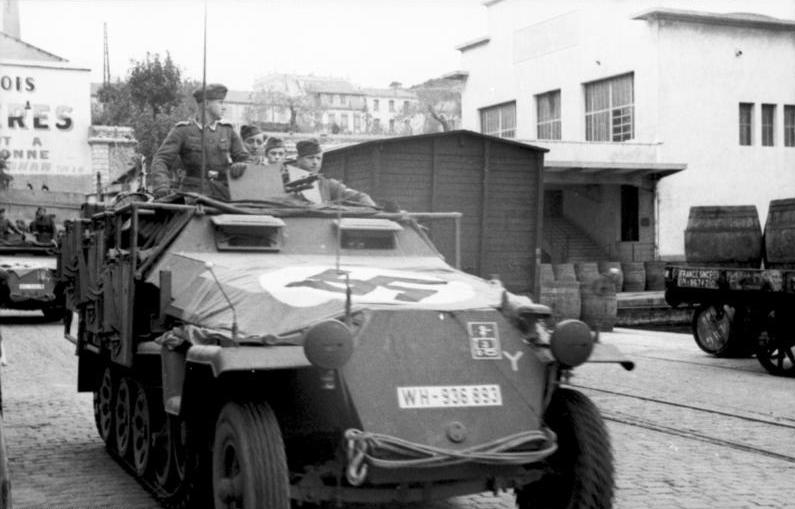
A Sd.Kfz. 251 of the 7th Panzer in southern France, November 1942

- 25th Panzer Regiment
- 6th Panzer Grenadier Regiment
- 7th Panzer Grenadier Regiment
- 7th Reconnaissance Battalion
- 78th Motorized Artillery Regiment
- 58th Armoured Combat Engineer Battalion
- 42nd Antitank Battalion
- 296th Anti-aircraft Battalion (attached Army troops)
- 58th Field replacement battalion
- Divisional services

== See also ==
- SS Panzer Division order of battle
- Panzer division
