= Karl Rothenburg =

German military leader and major general of the Wehrmacht

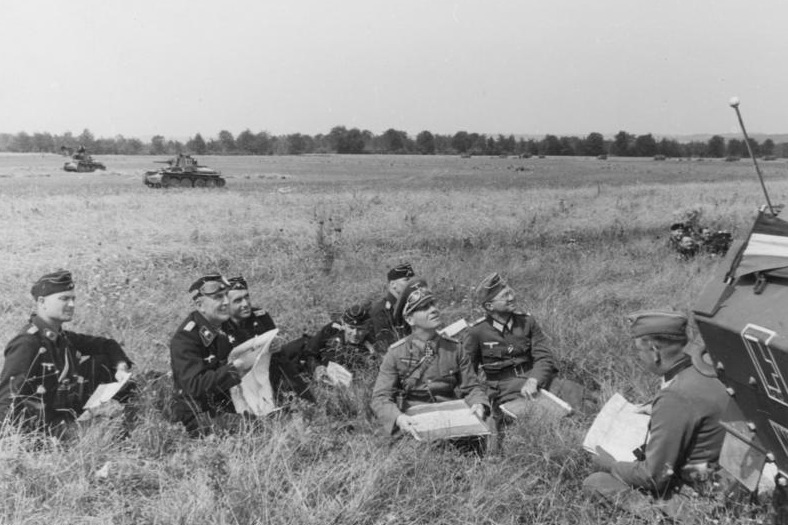
- Karl Rothenburg (2nd from left), June 1940
- Born: 8 June 1894; Fürstenwalde, German Empire
- Died: 28 June 1941 (aged 47); Near Minsk, Soviet Union
- Military career
- Allegiance: German Empire; Nazi Germany
- Branch: German Army
- Service years: 1914–1941
- Rank: Generalmajor (Posthumously)
- Conflicts: World War I; World War II; Invasion of Poland; Battle of France; Operation Barbarossa; Battle of Białystok–Minsk
- Awards: Pour le Mérite; Knight's Cross of the Iron Cross

Karl Eduard August Rothenburg (8 June 1894 – 28 June 1941) was a highly decorated German officer in the Wehrmacht during World War II. He was a recipient of both the Pour le Mérite (of World War I) and the Knight's Cross of the Iron Cross of Nazi Germany. Between wars he served as a commander in the police force, before returning to the Wehrmacht in 1934. During World War II he was the commander of a Panzer Regiment of the 7th Panzer Division. Rothenburg was killed six days into the invasion of the Soviet Union on 28 June 1941 near Minsk, Belarus and was posthumously promoted to Generalmajor.

== Early career and World War I ==
Karl Rothenburg was born on 8 June 1894 in Fürstenwalde, German Empire as the son of high school teacher Georg Rothenburg and his wife Alwina (néé Sittmann). Following the Abitur, young Karl became a teacher as well, but was drafted into the German Imperial Army as One-year volunteer on 1 April 1914. He was assigned to the 3rd Company of the 5th Guards Foot Regiment (5. Garde-Regiment zu Fuß) located in Spandau near Berlin and underwent his basic training there.

Upon the outbreak of World War I, his regiment was ordered to the Western Front and took part in the Siege of Namur in Belgium. The 5th Guards Foot Regiment was subsequently transferred to the Eastern Front and Rothenburg took part in the combats against Imperial Russian Army at the Masurian Lakes and Łódź. He distinguished himself and was promoted to the rank of Unteroffizier (Corporal) by the end of December 1914.

In early 1915, Rothenburg took part in the winter battle of the Masurian Lakes and later in the combats in Courland and Lithuania. He was also appointed a Offizierstellvertreter (Officer Deputy) during that time. His regiment was ordered back to the West in fall of 1915 and Rothenburg was promoted to the rank of Leutnant der Reserve (Second lieutenant in the Reserves) on 8 November 1915. He participated later in the Battle of the Somme and became the acting commander of the 2nd Company.

One year later, in April 1917, Rothenburg became the permanent commander of this company and already had both classes of the Iron Cross for bravery. He later led his company during the German spring offensive and was wounded by shrapnel in the right hand during the breakthrough between Gouzeaucourt and Vermand on 29 March 1918. For his merits during the fighting in France, Rothenburg received the Knight's Cross of the Royal House Order of Hohenzollern with Swords.

During the following German offensive (Operation Gneisenau) in June 1918, Rothenburg's company was tasked with the capture of Noyon-Montdidier area. While advancing on La Berlière, Rothenburg haven't wait for orders and captured the heavily fortified village including the nearby Ricquebourg wood. His company then led the battalion's subsequent pursuit of fleeing enemy and after reaching the Matz river, where advance was halted. Rothenburg and his company then crossed the river on its own despite heavy enemy fire and covered regiment's crossing. For his service during the Gneisenau Operation, Rothenburg was decorated with the Pour le Mérite, the highest German decoration for bravery.

== Interwar period ==
Following the Armistice, Rothenburg was demobilized on 20 December 1918 and resumed his job as a teacher. He then joined the Schutzpolizei in Gotha and rose to the rank of Hauptmann (Captain) by September 1924. Rothenburg then assumed command of police detachment in Jena and following the promotion to Major in summer 1930, he was appointed commander of Schutzpolizei in Weimar. In April 1933, Rothenburg was promoted to Oberstleutnant (lieutenant colonel) and assumed command of Police school in Sondershausen.

When the Wehrmacht was established in early 1935, Rothenburg requested to be reactivated to the Army service, which was granted and he was assigned as Major to the Kampfwagen-Regiment 1 (Armored Vehicle Regiment Nr. 1) in Zossen. The regiment was redesignated Panzer-Regiment 1 under Colonel Ludwig von Radlmaier and Rothenburg was assigned to the regimental staff in Erfurt. He assumed command of 2nd Battalion, Panzer-Regiment 6 in Neuruppin in August 1936 and took part in the Occupation of Czechoslovakia during Sudeten crisis. Rothenburg was promoted to Oberstleutnant (lieutenant colonel) on 1 April 1938 and became commander of Panzer-Regiment 6 in March 1939. He was promoted to the temporary rank of Oberst (Colonel) in August 1939.

== World War II ==
During the Invasion of Poland in September 1939, Rothenburg and his regiment took part in the combats in Polish Corridor and then in Toruń and Brest-Litovsk area as the part of 3rd Panzer Division. Rothenburg received Clasps to the Iron Cross for his service and following the Polish campaign, he was transferred to Gera, Thuringia where he assumed command of Panzer Regiment 25 of the newly formed 7th Panzer Division under Generalmajor Georg Stumme.

Rothenburg spent following months with the training on Czechoslovak Panzer 38(t) tanks and developed a kind relationship with new divisional commander, then-Generalmajor Erwin Rommel. During the Battle of France in May and June 1940, Rothenburg's regiment broke through the Allies' Meuse River defenses, smashed through Belgium and France, and overran French 1st Armoured Division, destroying more than 100 tanks and some 30 armored cars in the process.

Then Rothenburg and his tanks helped to repel British counterattack to Arras, overran the French 31st Motorized Infantry Division and then helped destroy French 1st Army at Lille. The 25th Panzer Regiment then turned south and captured the city of Cherbourg and pushed almost to the Spanish border by the time the French surrendered. Rothenburg also rescued Rommel by picking him up from the battlefield, when his command tank was knocked out. For his service in France, Rothenburg received the Knight's Cross of the Iron Cross, the highest decoration of Nazi Germany awarded for bravery in combat.

The 25th Panzer Regiment was then engaged in the occupation duties in the area of Bordeaux until February 1941 when it was relocated to East Prussia. During the Operation Barbarossa, the invasion of the Soviet Union, Rothenburg and his regiment during the capture of Wilna on 24 June 1941. His regiment then became involved in the heavy fighting of Minsk, where Rothenburg was wounded by an explosion from the burning armored train.

Rothenburg was offered to be evacuated by a Fiesler Storch reconnaissance plane or by a panzer escort, but he refused both because he didn't want to weaken his already depleted regiment. He decided to drive with two cars back to the rear. On his way through the enemy occupied land, he was killed on 28 June and his body was discovered the next day. Rothenburg was posthumously promoted to Generalmajor and his regiment received an honorary title "Panzerregiment Rothenburg", which was also commonly accepted by its members.

== Awards ==
- Knight's Cross of the Iron Cross on 3 June 1940 as Oberst and commander of Panzer-Regiment 25
- Pour le Mérite (30 June 1918)
- Clasp to the Iron Cross (1939)
  - 2nd Class (15 September 1939)
  - 1st Class (9 October 1939)
- Knight's Cross of the Royal House Order of Hohenzollern with Swords (23 May 1918)
- Prussian Iron Cross (1914)
  - 2nd Class
  - 1st Class
- Wound Badge (1918) in Black
- Honour Cross of the World War 1914/1918
- Panzer Badge in Bronze
- Sudetenland Medal with the Prague Castle bar
- Wehrmacht Long Service Award, 1st Class

== Sources ==
- Fellgiebel, Walther-Peer (2000) [First published 1986]. Die Träger des Ritterkreuzes des Eisernen Kreuzes 1939–1945 — Die Inhaber der höchsten Auszeichnung des Zweiten Weltkrieges aller Wehrmachtteile [The Bearers of the Knight's Cross of the Iron Cross 1939–1945 — The Owners of the Highest Award of the Second World War of all Wehrmacht Branches] (in German). Friedberg, Germany: Podzun-Pallas. ISBN 978-3-7909-0284-6.
