= Saalfelder Höhe =

- Ortsteil of Saalfeld
- Interactive map of Saalfelder Höhe
- Location within Germany Location within Thuringia
- Coordinates: 50°37′51″N 11°15′35″E
- Country: Germany
- State: Thuringia
- District: Saalfeld-Rudolstadt
- Town: Saalfeld

Area
  - Total: 63.21 km^{2} (24.41 sq mi)
- Elevation: 570 m (1,870 ft)

Population (2016-12-31)
  - Total: 2,988
  - Density: 47.27/km^{2} (122.4/sq mi)
- Time zone: UTC+01:00 (CET)
  - Summer (DST): UTC+02:00 (CEST)
- Postal codes: 07422
- Dialling codes: 036736, 036741
- Vehicle registration: SLF
- Website: www.saalfelder-hoehe.de

Saalfelder Höhe (pronounced [ˈzaːlfɛldɐ ˈhøːə], lit. 'Saalfeld Heights') is a former municipality in the district Saalfeld-Rudolstadt, in Thuringia, Germany. Since July 2018, it is a part (Ortsteil) of the town Saalfeld, consisting of 17 villages.
