= The Plebeians Rehearse the Uprising =

- Original title: Die Plebejer proben den Aufstand
- Original language: German
- Written by: Günter Grass

Premiere
- Date: 15 January 1966
- Place: Schiller Theater

The Plebeians Rehearse the Uprising (German: Die Plebejer proben den Aufstand) is a 1966 play by German writer Günter Grass. It was premiered at the Berlin Schiller Theater on 15 January 1966. In the play, Grass criticizes Bertolt Brecht and his Berliner Ensemble for inaction in response to the East German uprising of 1953.

A 1970 English language version of the play was performed by the Royal Shakespeare Company at the Aldwych Theatre.
