= Saalfeld =

Town in Thuringia, Germany

- Town
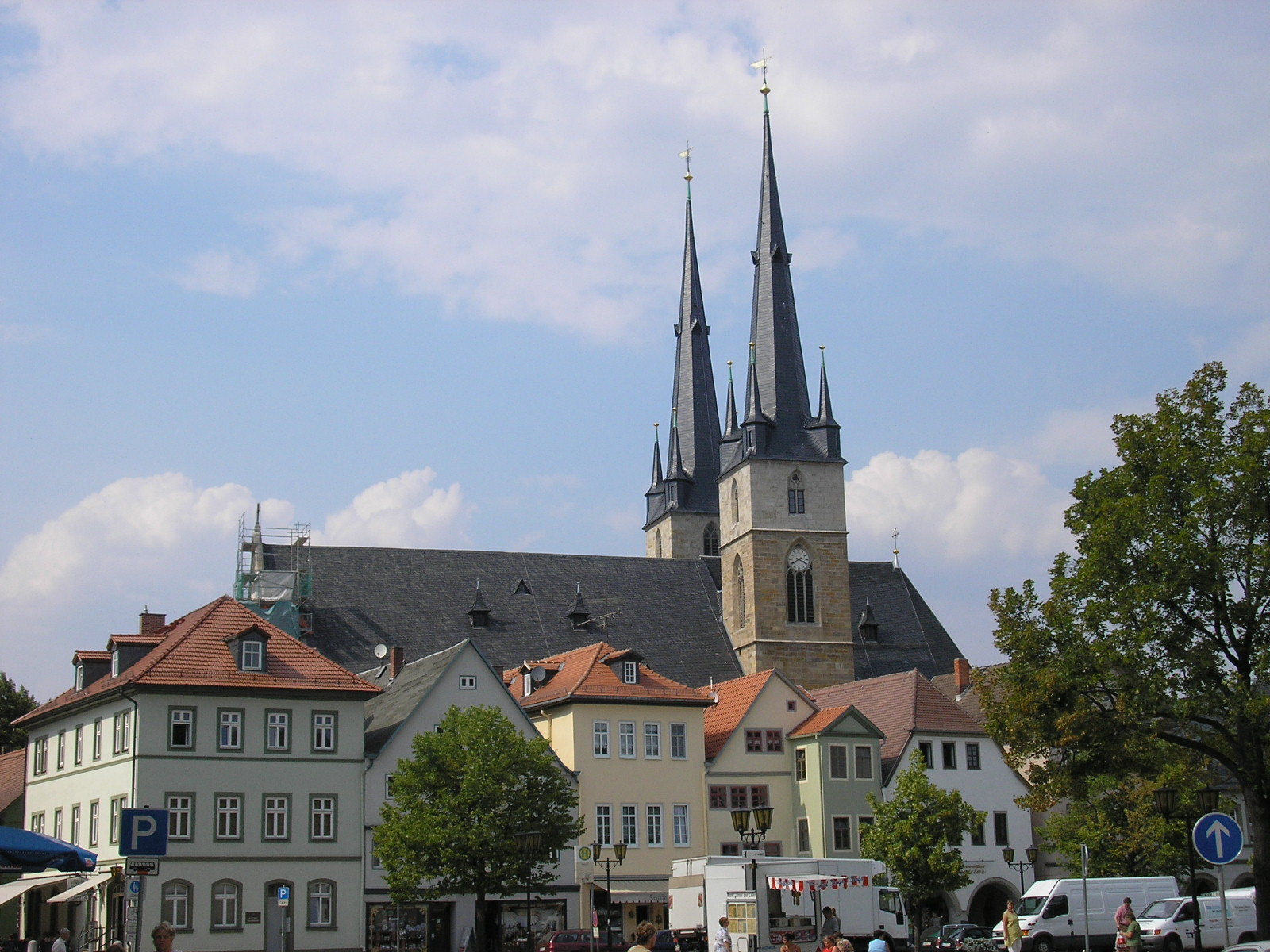
- St John's Church

- Coat of arms

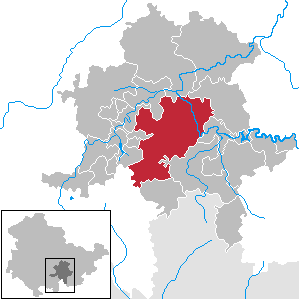
- Location of Saalfeld within Saalfeld-Rudolstadt district
- Interactive map of Saalfeld
- Location within Germany Location within Thuringia
- Coordinates: 50°39′N 11°22′E
- Country: Germany
- State: Thuringia
- District: Saalfeld-Rudolstadt
- Subdivisions: 23

Government
  - Mayor (2024–30): Steffen Kania (CDU)

Area
  - Total: 145.56 km^{2} (56.20 sq mi)
- Elevation: 235 m (771 ft)

Population (2025-12-31)
  - Total: 29,086
  - Density: 199.82/km^{2} (517.53/sq mi)
- Time zone: UTC+01:00 (CET)
  - Summer (DST): UTC+02:00 (CEST)
- Postal codes: 07301–07318
- Dialling codes: 03671
- Vehicle registration: SLF
- Website: www.saalfeld.de

Saalfeld (German pronunciation: [ˈzaːlˌfɛlt]; officially Saalfeld/Saale) is a town in Germany, capital of the Saalfeld-Rudolstadt district of Thuringia. It is best known internationally as the ancestral seat of the Saxe-Coburg and Gotha branch of the Saxon House of Wettin.

== Geography ==
The town is situated in the valley of the Saale River north of the Thuringian Highland, 48 km (30 mi) south of the German cultural centre Weimar. Saalfeld station is currently served by Intercity-Express trains running from Berlin to Munich.

Saalfeld has 28,000 inhabitants. Together with neighbouring Rudolstadt and Bad Blankenburg, Saalfeld forms a tri-city area with a population of about 70,000.

The local mountain is the Kulm, which is 481.9 metres above sea level.

== History ==
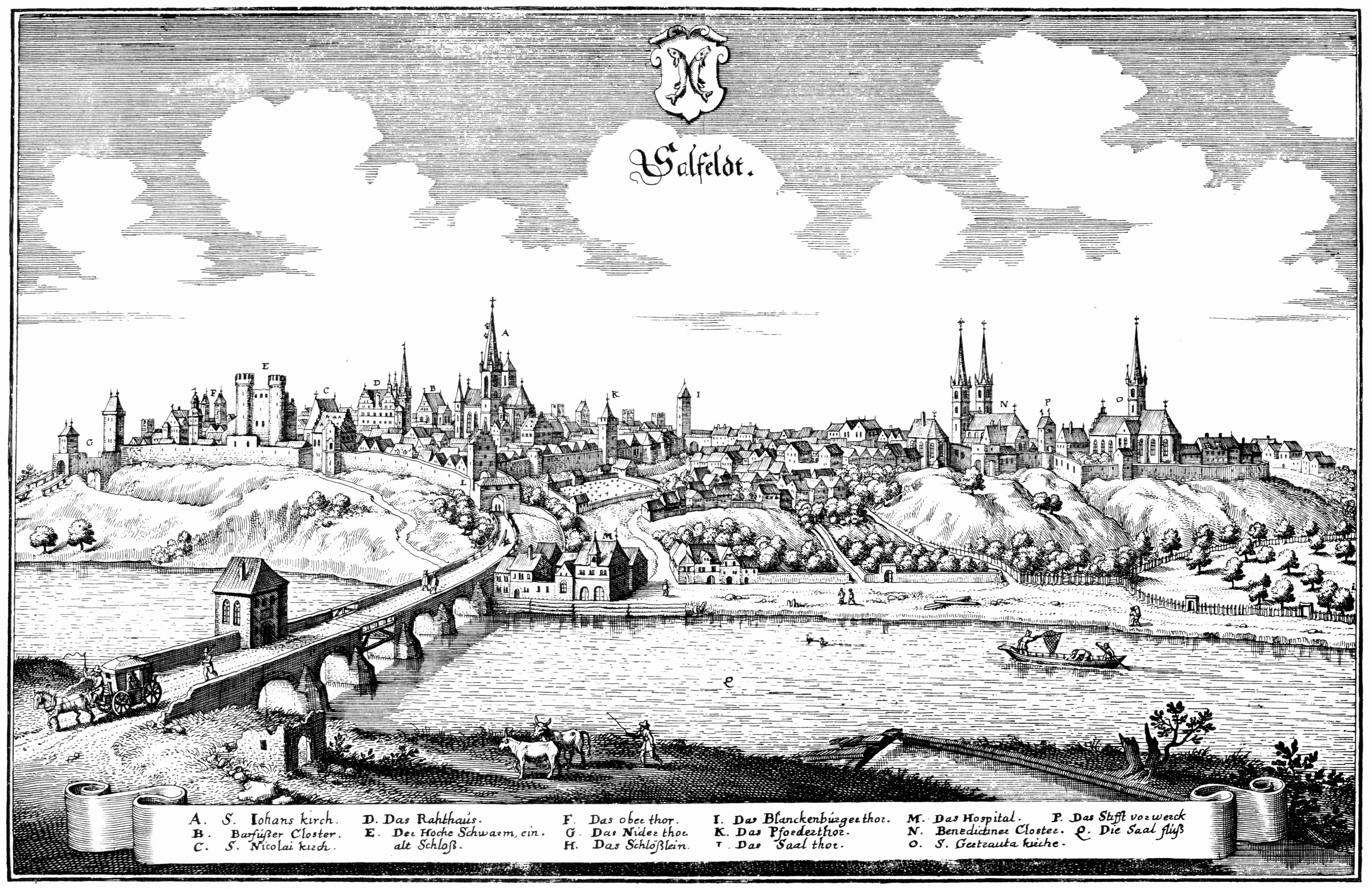
Saalfeld, Matthäus Merian, about 1650

Saalfeld is one of the historic towns of Thuringia, possibly founded by the 7th century around a Thuringii (Gothic) fortress today called Hoher Schwarm or Sorbenburg (Sorbs' Castle). The area was first mentioned in an 899 deed. Kitzerstein Castle standing on an eminence above the Saale River, was said to have been originally erected by the German King Henry the Fowler, although the present-day building was not built before the 16th century. In 1012 the last Ottonian emperor Henry II ceded the former Carolingian Kaiserpfalz to Count Palatine Ezzo of Lotharingia, whose daughter Richeza bequested it to the Archbishops of Cologne.

According to the local chronicler Lambert of Hersfeld, Archbishop Anno II of Cologne in 1071 established a Benedictine abbey here, which quickly became an ecclesiastical centre in eastern Thuringia but was destroyed during the German Peasants' War in 1526. A Franciscan monastery was established about 1250, which also was dissolved during the Protestant Reformation. The Hohenstaufen emperor Frederick Barbarossa had ordered the layout of an Imperial city, parts of its medieval walls and bastions are preserved up to today. Nevertheless, the citizens in 1208 had to receive town privileges from the hands of the Counts of Schwarzburg as their feudal lords.

=== House of Wettin ===
In 1389 the town finally was acquired by Landgrave Balthasar of Thuringia, a member of the House of Wettin. Saalfeld's economy prospered from surrounding mines, transport on the Saale River as well as from fishing (expressed by the barbels in the town's coat of arms). The Wettin rulers had the Gothic Saint John hall church erected at the site of a Romanesque predecessor building until 1514. The Gothic town hall was completed in 1537. The ruling dynasty reached its height of importance, when in 1423 all Wettin lands including the Thuringian estates were incorporated into the Electorate of Saxony (Upper Saxony).

However, already in 1485 Elector Ernest of Saxony agreed on the Leipzig partition with his younger brother Duke Albert III. Ernest retained the southern Thuringian estates with Saalfeld; his grandson John Frederick I lost the electoral dignity in the 1547 Capitulation of Wittenberg ending the Schmalkaldic War, along with all his possessions outside of Thuringia. Confirmed by Emperor Maximilian II at the 1570 Diet of Speyer, John Frederick's Ernestine descendants only retained the duchies of Saxe-Weimar and (from 1572) Saxe-Coburg-Eisenach. Upon the death of Duke Frederick William I of Saxe-Weimar in 1602, Saalfeld passed to the newly established Duchy of Saxe-Altenburg, from 1673 Saxe-Gotha-Altenburg.

=== Saxe-Coburg-Saalfeld ===
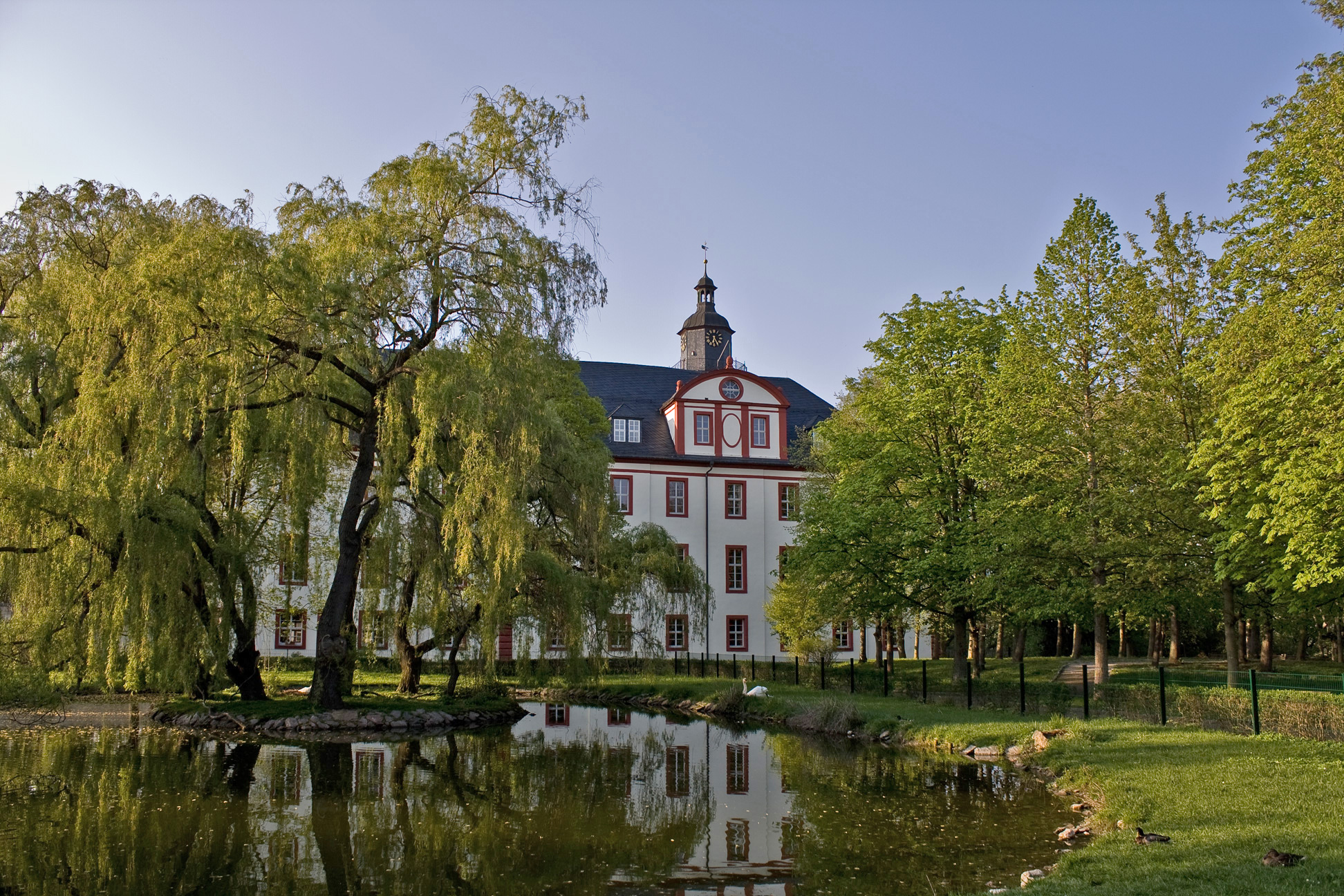
Saalfeld Castle

After several blazes in the early 16th century, Saalfeld had been rebuilt in a lavish Renaissance style. In 1675 Duke Albert V of Saxe-Coburg upon his accession chose the town as his residence and from 1677 onwards had Saalfeld Castle erected on the site of the destroyed Benedictine abbey, which in 1680 fell to his younger brother John Ernest IV. After Albert's death in 1699, John Ernest also claimed Saxe-Coburg and called himself a duke of Saxe-Coburg-Saalfeld.

The Castle, which has been renovated and is today the town administrative building, was home to four generations of the Saxe-Coburg-Saalfeld branch. Until 1825, Saalfeld remained one of two capitals of the duchy, together with Coburg, its Franconian sister town to the south. The 4th Duke Ernest Frederick (1724–1800) was the last to be born in Saalfeld; in 1764, he moved the capital from Saalfeld to Coburg, where in 1805 his son and heir Duke Francis (1750–1806) would buy Rosenau Castle as his residence.

Francis' children were linked to many of Europe's royal families: His daughter Princess Victoria of Saxe-Coburg-Saalfeld (1786–1861) by her marriage with Prince Edward became the mother of Queen Victoria. Her brother Duke Ernest III of Saxe-Coburg-Saalfeld (1784–1844) was the father of Queen Victoria's husband, Prince Consort Albert. This line continues unbroken from Queen Victoria through to King Charles III today. At about the same period, their brother Duke Leopold of Saxe-Coburg-Saalfeld (1790–1865) became the ancestor of the royal House of Belgium in 1831, while their sister Princess Juliane of Saxe-Coburg-Saalfeld (1781–1860) married Grand Duke Constantine Pavlovich of Russia. Other descendants of Duke Francis include Wilhelm II, German Emperor, Alexandra, Empress consort of Russia, Victoria, Queen consort of Spain, Ferdinand II, King consort of Portugal, Carlota, Empress consort of Mexico, Ferdinand I, King of Bulgaria, Sofía, Queen consort of Spain, Princess of Greece and Denmark, Maud, Queen consort of Norway, and Marie, Queen consort of Romania.

During the time of Duke Ernest III in 1826, the neighbouring ducal line of Saxe-Gotha and Altenburg became extinct. Ernest received the former Saxe-Gotha but in exchange had to give up Saalfeld in favour of his Ernestine cousin Duke Bernhard II of Saxe-Meiningen.

=== Modern times ===
On 10 October 1806 a united Prussian and Saxon contingent met with a corps of the French Grande Armée under Marshall Jean Lannes at the Battle of Saalfeld, whereby Prince Louis Ferdinand of Prussia was killed. The opening of the Leipzig-Probstzella railway further boosted the town's development. After World War I and the German Revolution of 1918–1919, Saalfeld became part of the newly established Free State of Thuringia. As a railway junction and garrison town of the Wehrmacht armed forces from 1936, it was strongly affected by strategic bombing during World War II.

Upon the post-World War II division of Germany, Saalfeld was an Inner-German border station on the Saal Railway—one of two routes that could be taken by trains between Leipzig/Halle and Nuremberg. As a border station its steam locomotive shed assumed extra importance as Saalfeld essentially became the southern terminus of GDR train services. Due to the continued use of steam locomotives in East Germany after the end of steam working in West Germany, the area became a mecca for railway enthusiasts for some years. However, despite being very close to the Inner German border to the south, it was only accessible by a very roundabout route.

In July 2018 the former municipalities of Saalfelder Höhe and Wittgendorf were merged into Saalfeld. The former municipalities Reichmannsdorf and Schmiedefeld were merged into Saalfeld in January 2019.

== Economy ==
Traditionally, Saalfeld was known for its silver mines. Today, Saalfeld has a number of prosperous industries, including the manufacture of machinery, bricks, paint, malt, cigars, hosiery, chocolate and vinegar. Other industries are brewing, printing and iron-founding, and there are ochre and iron mines in the area.

Tourism and recreation-related activities make up a significant part of the local economy. Saalfeld is located in the mountainous forests of Thuringia, a province well known for its winter sports, supplying half of the gold medals for overall medal table winner Germany in the 2006 and 2010 Winter Olympics.

Saalfeld is a popular base for hikers taking on the mountainous 168 km Rennsteig ridge, one of Germany's best known hiking trails.

== Culture ==
Saalfeld is associated with the Thüringer Symphoniker Saalfeld-Rudolstadt, a symphony orchestra jointly connected with Saalfeld and neighbouring Rudolstadt. The orchestra is part of the Thüringer Landestheater Rudolstadt und Thüringer Symphoniker Saalfeld-Rudolstadt GmbH, which maintains both a theatre and an orchestra.

The present-day orchestra was formed in 1992 through the merger of the Rudolstadt orchestra with the State Symphony Orchestra of Saalfeld, founded in 1952. It gives symphonic, palace and special concerts in both cities and also maintains educational programmes for children and young people.

== Twin towns – sister cities ==
Saalfeld is twinned with:

- Kulmbach, Germany
- Samaipata, Bolivia
- Sokolov, Czech Republic
- Stains, France
- Zalewo, Poland

== Notable people ==
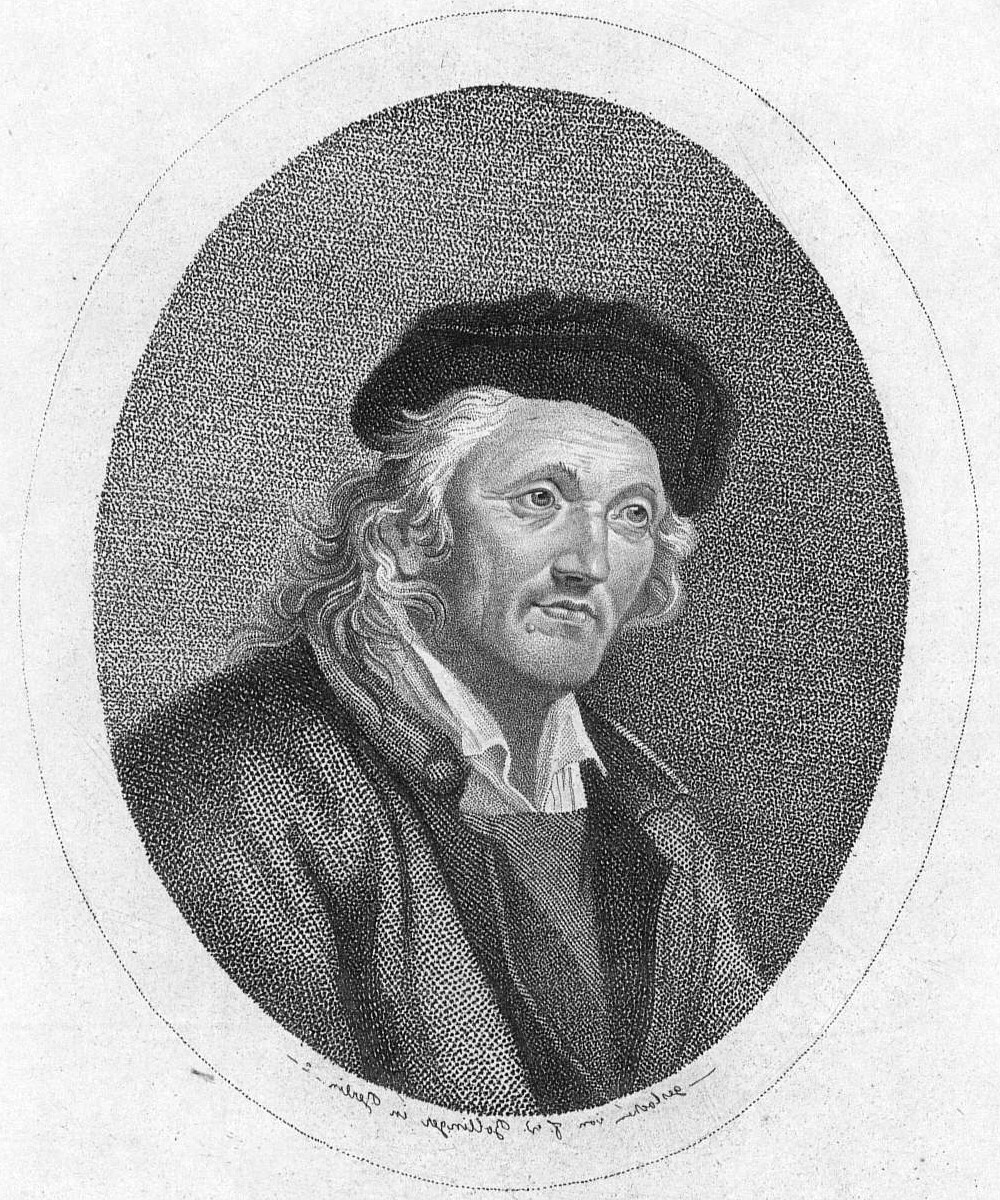
Johann Kirnberger

- Britta Bilač (born 1968), high jumper
- Hugo Eberlein (1887–1941), politician (SPD, USPD, KPD)
- Petra Felke (born 1959), track and field athlete, Olympic winner
- Karl Friedrich Geldner (1852–1929), professor of linguistic and noted Sanskrit scholar
- Wolfram Grandezka (born 1969), actor
- Jörg-Wolfgang Jahn (born 1936), violinist and music educator
- Max Jüttner (1888–1963), military officer and SA general
- Johann Kirnberger (1721–1783), composer and royal music director, student of J. S. Bach
- Paul Oßwald (1905–1993), football manager
- Erasmus Reinhold (1511–1553), mathematician and the most influential astronomer
- Oscar Bernhard Richter (1823–1905), founder and owner of the Optical-mechanical workshop "Oscar Richter" in St. Petersburg
- Michael Schönheit (born in 1961), conductor and organist
- Heinrich Schulz (1893–1979), officer and political assassin
- Johann Semler (1725–1791), theologian and father of German rationalism
- Ror Wolf (1932–2020), artist, writer, and poet

== See also ==
- The Saalfeld Fairy Grottoes (die Feengrotten), a subterranean tourist site near Saalfeld

== General and cited sources ==
- Chisholm, Hugh, ed. (1911). "Saalfeld" . Encyclopædia Britannica. Vol. 23 (11th ed.). Cambridge University Press. p. 953.
- Port, Andrew I. (2007). Conflict and Stability in the German Democratic Republic. Cambridge University Press.
