= The Ghost Division =

- Author: Alfred Tschimpke (1900 Aug 14 - 1955 May 20)
- Original title: Die Gespenster-Division
- Translator: Steven Lehrer
- Language: English
- Genre: History
- Publisher: SF Tafel
- Publication date: 2025
- Publication place: Germany
- Media type: Paperback
- Pages: 257 pp
- ISBN: 979-8276597812

Die Gespenster-Division: Mit der Panzerwaffe durch Belgien und Frankreich; English: The Ghost Division: With the Panzer Weapon through Belgium and France) is a 1940 war narrative and propaganda book written by German war correspondent Alfred Tschimpke. The book chronicles the advance of the 7th Panzer Division, commanded by General Erwin Rommel, during the invasion of Belgium and France in May and June 1940. Originally published by the central publishing house of the Nazi Party in 1942, the book is considered a work of wartime propaganda designed to glorify the German military's "Blitzkrieg" tactics and legitimize the invasion. An English translation by Steven Lehrer was published in 2025.

== Publication history ==
Alfred Tschimpke, 1942. Tschimpke was Head of the Press Department of the Reichsführer-SS, Heinrich Himmler (Source: Kürschner Deutscher Literatur-Kalender (1943))

The book was originally published in Germany under the title Die Gespenster-Division by the Zentralverlag der NSDAP (Franz Eher Nachfolger GmbH, Munich) in 1942. The English translation, titled The Ghost Division, was released in trade paper format in the United States by SF Tafel in 2025.

== Synopsis ==
The narrative follows the experiences of the 7th Panzer Division, nicknamed the "Ghost Division" by the French due to its speed and surprise attacks, from the onset of the invasion to the capitulation of French forces on the coast.

=== Mobilization and Invasion ===
The account begins on May 9, 1940, with officers receiving sealed orders under the guise of an "exercise". The invasion of Belgium commences at 5:35 AM on May 10, characterized by the rapid movement of motorized units and the clearing of roadblocks constructed from felled trees. Tschimpke describes the initial interactions with the local population in border villages, claiming some greeted German soldiers with the Nazi salute.

=== Crossing the Meuse ===
A significant portion of the book focuses on the crossing of the Meuse River, described as a "stream of flames" due to heavy artillery and machine-gun fire from French and Belgian defenders. The text highlights the destruction of bridges and the use of German tanks to suppress enemy bunkers and machine-gun nests to allow combat engineers to build pontoon bridges.

=== The Maginot Line and Breakthrough ===
The narrative details the division's breakthrough of the extension of the Maginot Line near Maubeuge. Tschimpke portrays the German tanks as overcoming the "stone wonder" of the French fortifications through speed and aggressive tactical maneuvers, effectively demystifying the perceived invincibility of the line. The division reportedly covered 60 kilometers in a single night attack, pushing deep into French territory.

=== Advance to the Coast ===
The book describes the "race to the sea," moving through Cambrai and Arras toward the English Channel. It recounts the encirclement of Allied forces, including the surrender of the British 51st Highland Division and French troops at Saint-Valery-en-Caux, where Tschimpke claims 25,000 men and eight generals were captured. The narrative concludes with the division's advance to Cherbourg, the surrender of the city, and the raising of the Swastika flag over the citadel.

== Themes and Style ==
=== Propaganda and Ideology ===
The book is written in a triumphalist tone typical of Third Reich literature. It glorifies the camaraderie of the German soldiers and the "offensive spirit" of the stormtroopers, while omitting mention of German atrocities or the suffering of the civilian population caused by the invasion. The text frequently mocks the concept of French and Belgian neutrality and portrays the Allied leadership as incompetent.

=== Depiction of Rommel ===
General Erwin Rommel is a central figure in the narrative, depicted as a "frontline general" who personally directs battles from tanks or open vehicles. He is portrayed as possessing a "cool head" and "fighting heart," often intervening in dangerous situations to rally his troops, such as during the stalled crossing of the Meuse.

=== Racial and National Depictions ===
The book reflects Nazi racial ideology, particularly in its depiction of colonial troops fighting for France. Tschimpke refers to these soldiers using racial slurs and describes them as "wild beasts" and "uncivilized jungle people," contrasting them with the "disciplined" German soldiers. The narrative also disparages the British ("Tommies") and French ("Poilus"), suggesting they were betrayed by their governments and lacked the will to fight.

== Critical reception ==
Modern analysis, as presented in the translator's foreword, categorizes the book as a historical document of Nazi propaganda rather than an objective history. While it provides valuable technical insights into the operational strategies of a Panzer division—such as river crossings and logistics—the narrative is criticized for its lack of critical reflection, one-sided portrayal of the conflict, and reliance on mythmaking. The text serves as a window into the mindset of the German military during the early successes of World War II.
