= Soviet dive bomber =

The USSR produced three models of dive bomber during World War II. Soviet dive bomber may refer to:

- Petlyakov Pe-2
- Petlyakov Pe-3
- Petlyakov Pe-8
