= Andrew Ian Port =

American historian and academic

- Born: 1967 (age 58–59); Brooklyn, New York
- Awards: DAAD Prize for Distinguished Scholarship in German and European Studies

Academic background
- Education: Yale University (B.A.); Harvard University (Ph.D.)

Academic work
- Discipline: History
- Sub-discipline: Modern European history
- Institutions: Wayne State University
- Notable works: Conflict and Stability in the German Democratic Republic (2007); Never Again: Germans and Genocide after the Holocaust (2023)

Andrew Ian Port is an American historian and professor of modern European history at Wayne State University. He is known for his research on everyday life in the German Democratic Republic and on postwar German memory culture. Port is the author of several books, including Conflict and Stability in the German Democratic Republic (2007) and Never Again: Germans and Genocide after the Holocaust (2023). He served as editor-in-chief of the journal Central European History from 2014 to 2019.

== Career ==
Port was born in Brooklyn, New York City in 1967. He earned his undergraduate degree at Yale University and completed his doctorate in history at Harvard University. After this, he joined the faculty at Wayne State University, where he is a professor of modern European history.

From 2012 to 2014, Port was review editor of the German Studies Review. He later served as editor-in-chief of Central European History between 2014 and 2019.

His research examines the social and political dynamics of East Germany and the evolution of German responses to genocide after 1945.

== Selected works ==
- Conflict and Stability in the German Democratic Republic (Cambridge University Press, 2007)
- Die rätselhafte Stabilität der DDR (Ch. Links, 2010)
- Becoming East German (Berghahn Books, 2013, co-edited)
- Never Again: Germans and Genocide after the Holocaust (The Belknap Press of Harvard University Press, 2023)
- Germany (Polity, 2025)

== Reception ==
Port’s scholarship has been discussed in both academic and mainstream publications. Conflict and Stability in the German Democratic Republic was reviewed as “an important and nuanced study of the East German experience” by historian Mary Fulbrook in German History.

The German translation, Die rätselhafte Stabilität der DDR, received attention in the German media, with Deutschlandfunk Kultur noting that Port’s work “neither glorifies nor vilifies the GDR, but presents it in all its contradictions.”

His 2023 book Never Again: Germans and Genocide after the Holocaust was reviewed in History Today, which called it “a major contribution to debates about German memory and responsibility.”
