= Jonas Steponavičius =

Lithuanian Roman Catholic priest (1880–1947)

- Born: 10 March 1880; Zokoriai, Russian Empire
- Died: 8 December 1947 (aged 67); Wangen im Allgäu, West Germany
- Education: Vilnius Priest Seminary; Saint Petersburg Roman Catholic Theological Academy; Ludwig-Maximilians-Universität München; Friedrich Wilhelm University of Berlin; Leipzig University
- Occupations: Priest, member of the Seimas, school principal, teacher
- Political party: Lithuanian Christian Democratic Party
- Board member of: Lithuanian Education Society Rytas; Lithuanian Scientific Society
- Awards: Order of the Lithuanian Grand Duke Gediminas (1931)

Jonas Steponavičius (10 March 1880 – 8 December 1947) was a Lithuanian Roman Catholic priest active in Lithuanian cultural and political life.

He was ordained a priest in 1906 and earned Ph.D. in psychology in 1912. He returned to Lithuania and became a priest in the Church of St. Johns, Vilnius. He joined Lithuanian cultural life, becoming the first chairman of the Lithuanian Education Society Rytas which established and maintained Lithuanian-language one-room schools. His attempt at holding Lithuanian-language service at the Church of St. Johns caused Polish protests and he was reassigned to the Dominican Church of the Holy Spirit and later to Semeliškės. During World War I, he served as a military chaplain in the Caucasus Campaign.

After returning to Lithuania, he joined the Lithuanian Christian Democratic Party and was elected four times to the Seimas (parliament) from 1920 to the December 1926 coup d'état that brought the regime of Antanas Smetona. He retired from politics and became a school director in Zarasai and a teacher in Utena. In mid-1944, Steponavičius was one of the organizers of the Fatherland Defense Force, a short-lived military unit formed to combat approaching Soviet forces. He retreated to Germany where he died in 1947.

== Biography ==
=== Education ===
Steponavičius was born in Zokoriai, near Antalieptė, Kovno Governorate, Russian Empire, to a family of petty landed nobles. He received his first education at home and in 1890 was admitted to the Russian-language Gymnasium of Alexander III in Riga. In 1896, he transferred to the Riga State Gymnasium but left it without completing the sixth grade in 1899. He continued his education at the Vilnius Priest Seminary and the Saint Petersburg Roman Catholic Theological Academy. He was ordained priest in 1906 and defended his dissertation on Immanuel Kant to receive master's degree in theology in 1907 . He the studied natural sciences and psychology in Germany at the Ludwig-Maximilians-Universität München, the Friedrich Wilhelm University of Berlin, and Leipzig University. At Leipzig University, he studied under professor Wilhelm Wundt and defended his Ph.D. thesis on subjective equality in 1912.

=== In Vilnius 1913–1914 ===
After studies, Steponavičius returned to Lithuania and was appointed as priest to the Church of St. Johns, Vilnius. He supported and promoted Lithuanian language and culture in contrast with widespread Polonization. In January 1913, he was elected as the first chairman of the Lithuanian Education Society Rytas. The society sought to establish Lithuanian-language schools, courses, reading rooms, and other educational institutions in the Vilnius Region. It was successful in establishing numerous local chapters and one-room schools. In May 1913, he was assigned as religion teacher to the private gymnasium of Mikhail Pavlovsky. In June, he was elected to the board of the Lithuanian Scientific Society and presented a paper on experimental psychology. He also joined the Lithuanian Art Society and contributed articles to Lithuanian press (Draugija, Viltis).

At his church, in May 1913, Steponavičius wanted to launch a series of Lithuanian-language church services for the May devotions to the Blessed Virgin Mary. They were to be held at 6 a.m. so that Lithuanian servants could pray before work. Due to loud protests and interruptions by Polish residents, the service was held only twice. The episode reached Kazimierz Mikołaj Michalkiewicz, administrator of Vilnius Diocese, and Piotr Veryovkin, governor of Vilnius. The issue was widely discussed in the Lithuanian and Polish press and was raised by Juozas Laukaitis in the State Duma. It was referenced by Viltis as one of key moments when dual Polish-Lithuanian identity split into just Polish or just Lithuanian identity. Steponavičius was given a two-month vacation and then reassigned to the Dominican Church of the Holy Spirit.

=== Political work ===
In June 1914, he was appointed as dean to Semeliškės, a town about 45 kilometres (28 mi) west of Vilnius. The reasons for the assignment are not clear – there is some evidence that Steponavičius requested the transfer due to poor health, but it also could have been a retribution for his Lithuanian activities. In May 1915, during World War I, he was drafted to the Imperial Russian Army as a military chaplain and was sent to the Caucasus Campaign. Stationed in Tbilisi, he joined Lithuanian activities and managed to establish regular Lithuanian-language services at one of the Armenian churches. Sometime between 1916 and 1918, he returned to Semeliškės.

In 1920, during the Polish–Lithuanian War, he organized a 50-men partisan group to fight the Polish forces. He was arrested by the Poles and transported to Hrodna. Upon his release, Steponavičius became interested in politics. A member of the Lithuanian Christian Democratic Party since 1919, he actively campaigned in the April 1920 elections to the Constituent Assembly of Lithuania. He became a member of the assembly only on 4 February 1921 after the resignation of Jonas Andziulis. He was elected to the succeeding First, Second, and Third Seimas. In the Seimas, Steponavičius was a member of various parliamentary committees, including Finance and Budget (November 1922 – December 1926), National Defense (November 1922 – December 1926 with a break in June–July 1923), and Foreign Affairs (October 1924 – December 1926).

At the Constituent Assembly, Steponavičius was one of the most active members of the Christian Democratic bloc. As a member of two key parliamentary committees on finance and defense, he referred about 15 laws at the assembly. Based on his experience as a military chaplain, he frequently presented and referred laws concerning the Lithuanian Army and was particularly supportive of the Lithuanian Riflemen's Union. He also spoke on finances and presented the 1922 budget. Steponavičius was a member of three temporary commissions that investigated the situation with Lithuanian railways (it resulted in ten criminal cases), illegal sale of forests (it investigated 565 complaints), and corruption at the Trade and Industry Department.

At the First Seimas, Steponavičius referred about 30 laws but they were mainly related to adjusting compensation of various government employees now that Lithuania introduced its own currency, the Lithuanian litas. At the Second Seimas, Steponavičius presented and referred numerous laws related to the state budget, finances, and taxes. He referred laws on Lithuanian customs and import duties, joint stock companies, ratification of seven trade treaties, compensation of various government employees, military pensions, business income taxes, mandatory fire insurance, charges for the use railways, waterways, and ports, etc. At the Third Seimas, the Christian Democrats were in the opposition. He was elected as the second deputy speaker on 2 June 1926 but resigned the position on 26 November 1926. He criticized the government, particularly its budget, and with other members of his electoral bloc signed seven interpellations addressed to the Prime Minister Mykolas Sleževičius. After the December 1926 coup d'état, Steponavičius returned to his role of presenting and referring laws on budget and finances.

=== Pedagogical work ===
After the Third Seimas was dissolved in March 1927, Steponavičius retired from politics and devoted his time to teaching. He became the principal of the Zarasai secondary school effective September 1927. During his tenure, Steponavičius oversaw construction of the new modern school building and transformation of the school from a regular 4-year secondary school to an 8-year higher school of commerce. In December 1928, he established Zarasai chapter of the Motiejus Valančius folk high school (Lithuanian: Motiejaus Valančiaus liaudies universitetas) and funded it from his own savings. He taught German language at the public high school and psychology at the folk high school. In 1928–1930, he was the priest serving Smėlynė village located about 4.5 kilometres (2.8 mi) east from Zarasai. He was also the chairman of the Zarasai chapter of the Lithuanian Riflemen's Union and organized construction of the new chapter headquarters. In recognition for his services, he was awarded the Order of the Lithuanian Grand Duke Gediminas in the Third Degree in 1931.

In 1930, the Catholic youth organization Ateitis was banned by the Smetona's regime. A group of students secretly continued Ateitis activities and were questioned by the police. Steponavičius defended his students and was tried for insulting a deputy prosecutor. In June 1934, he was sentenced to four months in prison. The sentence was removed on appeal, but Steponavičius was demoted to a teacher and transferred to the Utena Saulė Gymnasium. Freed from administrative work and other various activities, Steponavičius returned to psychology and became interested in parapsychology. He published two volumes of his essays in 1937 and 1938. The publication of the third volume was interrupted by World War II.

=== World War II ===
During the German occupation of Lithuania during World War II, Steponavičius sympathized with the German regime. He briefly served as the burgomaster of Utena before returning to Zarasai where he worked as a teacher from September 1942 to May 1943. In early 1943, he was appointed as governor of the Zarasai district of the Generalbezirk Litauen. In this capacity, he participated in the All Lithuanian Conference of 5 April 1943. The conference, called by Petras Kubiliūnas, adopted a resolution encouraging Lithuanians to cooperate with the Germans and their efforts of raising a Lithuanian Waffen-SS legion. Steponavičius supported the Lithuanian Liberty Army which was preparing for an armed fight against the Red Army.

On 7 July 1944, Steponavičius with a group of armed men left Zarasai towards Samogitia. The group stopped near the Pievėnai village where Lithuanians decided to organize the Fatherland Defense Force. Steponavičius was a vocal supporter of organizing the unit and joining the Wehrmacht and opposed calls for guerrilla warfare. He was elected political advisor to the unit and helped establishing contacts with Hellmuth Mäder, officer in the 9th Army who promised weapons and uniforms. The unit suffered losses near Seda on 7 October 1944 and disintegrated soon after. Many of the men, including Steponavičius, retreated to Germany. He later compiled a list of men who fought and were killed near Seda.

He worked in a textile factory in Krnov (Jägerndorf), and as a farm hand and metal-worker near Wangen im Allgäu. After a brief illness, he died in Wangen im Allgäu on 8 December 1947 and was buried in the Saint Wolfgang Cemetery.
