= Paul Conrath =

German general

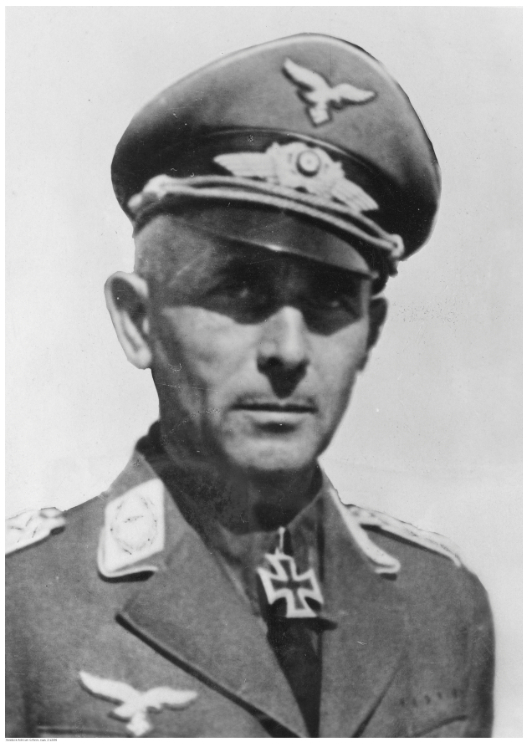
- Born: 22 November 1896; Rudow, Berlin, Kingdom of Prussia, German Empire
- Died: 15 January 1979 (aged 82); Hamburg, West Germany
- Military career
- Allegiance: German Empire; Weimar Republic; Nazi Germany
- Branch: Army; Police; Luftwaffe
- Service years: 1914–1945
- Rank: General der Fallschirmtruppe
- Commands: Fallschirm-Panzer Division 1 Hermann Göring
- Conflicts: World War I: Battle of Verdun; Battle of the Somme; World War II: Battle of France; Operation Barbarossa; Tunisian Campaign; Italian Campaign
- Awards: Knight's Cross of the Iron Cross with Oak Leaves

Paul Conrath (22 November 1896 – 15 January 1979) was a German general during World War II. He was a recipient of the Knight's Cross of the Iron Cross with Oak Leaves of Nazi Germany.

He would command the Panzer-Division Hermann Göring from regiment to division (1 June 1940 – 14 April 1944).

== World War I ==
Conrath was born in Berlin-Rudow, then Kingdom of Prussia, on 22 November 1896. Conrath joined the German Army with the 4th Guards Field Artillery Regiment (4. Garde-Feldartillerie-Regiment) on 10 August 1914 as a war volunteer and officer candidate, being assigned to the Reserve Field Artillery Regiment No. 44 (Reserve-Feldartillerie-Regiment Nr. 44) in October 1914 after his basic training. He followed his unit into the Western Front in France, seeing action at Verdun, the Somme and Flanders.

In October 1916 he was deployed as a battery officer, promoted to lieutenant (Leutnant) on 1 March 1917 and shortly thereafter appointed unit orderly officer in the 4th Baden Field Artillery Regiment No. 66 (4. Badischen Feldartillerie-Regiment Nr. 66). He retained this position until the end of the war.

== Inter-war years ==
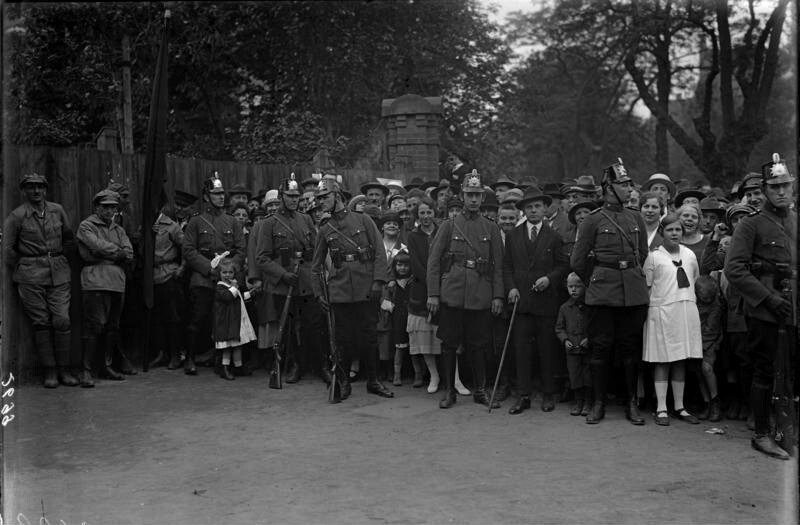
Weimar police regulating a KPD demonstration in Berlin, May 1926.

On 20 January 1919, Paul resigned from the army and, barely a year later, switched to the Prussian Security Police in Berlin on 11 January 1920. There he was first a platoon commander, then an orderly officer, unit adjutant and finally a Hundertschaftführer (literally "commander of a hundred). In 1930 he was assigned to the police school in Spandau as an instructor. On 15 May 1933, he became a police captain adjutant at the state police inspection in Central Germany in Halle, and later in Magdeburg.

On 15 June 1934 he became IIa on the staff of the Prussian Prime Minister Hermann Göring, serving in this capacity until 30 September 1936. On 1 April 1935, Conrath was transferred to the Air Force as a major and served as adjutant to the now Commander-in-Chief of the Air Force, Hermann Göring. From 1 October 1936 he left the Oberkommando der Luftwaffe and became battery commander in Flak Regiment 12 and 22 in Berlin-Lankwitz up to 30 September 1937. He then took over as commander of the 3rd Light Anti-Air Battalion (III. leichte Flakabteilung) of the Air Force's Regiment General Göring (RGG); a "praetorian guard" of Göring within the Nazi power politics, responsible for the personal protection of its namesake, air defence of Hitler's headquarters and the protection of Göring's sumptuous Carinhall estate – named after Göring's deceased first wife, Carin Axelina Hulda Göring.

This regiment occupied a brand new purpose-built barracks complex at Berlin-Reinickendorf, which was constructed to the highest standards and with the most modern of facilities. The complex boasted over 120 buildings and included gymnasia, outdoor and indoor swimming pools, sports areas and its own post office. The General Göring soldiers dressed in their distinctive uniforms with white collar patches and special unit cuffband (Ärmelstreifen), and became a regular sight on the streets of Berlin.

From 1 January 1938, he served once again as chief adjutant to the Commander-in-Chief of the Air Force, General Hermann Göring, and was promoted to lieutenant colonel (Oberstleutnant) on 1 December 1938.

== World War II ==
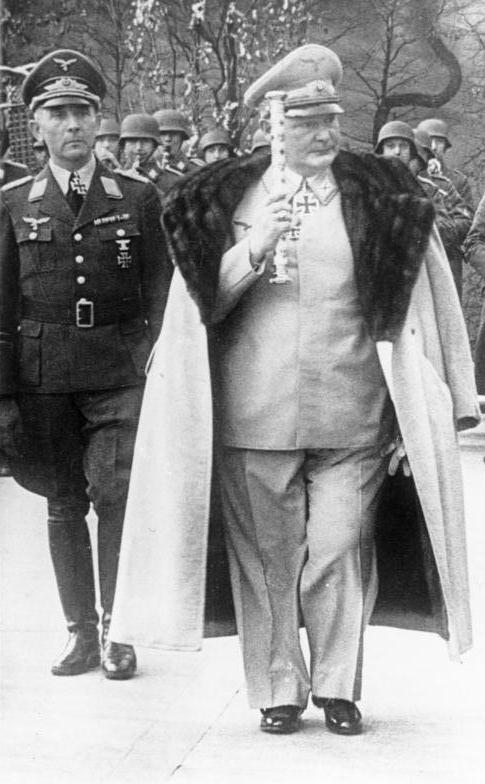
Paul Conrath (left) next to Hermann Göring reviewing troops close to the front (1942).

The Regiment General Göring remained in its bodyguard and air defense functions in Berlin at first, and only small elements saw action during the Polish campaign. On 1 March 1940, Conrath was promoted to colonel (Oberst) and as part of the RGG, he went into battle in the invasions of the Netherlands, Belgium and France. On 1 June he was appointed commander of the Regiment General Göring.

Conrath led his regiment, now named Regiment (mot.) Hermann Göring, in Operation Barbarossa, the attack on the Soviet Union from 22 June 1941.The unit was involved in heavy fighting in the Battle of Brody, the encirclement of Kiev and the Battle of Bryansk; earning praise and suffering heavy losses. Paul Conrath was awarded the Knight's Cross on 4 September 1941 for leading the regiment in the first week of the Russian campaign.

Back to the Reich, the General Göring was reorganized in France, first being expanded into a brigade in June (Luftwaffen-Brigade "Hermann Göring") and from 17 October 1942 to a division. Conrath had already been promoted to major general (Generalmajor) on 15 June 1942. The division was renamed Panzer-Division "Hermann Göring" and organized as an armoured division following the Army organization and receiving experienced army tankers, while sending an equal number of Luftwaffe personnel to the Army for training with Panzer units. The division was also reinforced with infantry, including up to 5,000 paratroopers - among them remnants of the Fallschirmjäger-Regiment 5, decimated in the airborne Battle of Crete.

The Hermann Göring Division was sent piece-meal to Tunisia during February–March amid its reorganization, as the Afrikakorps was desperately attempting to cling to its holdings in North Africa. The division would serve alongside Army units such as the 334th Infantry Division, 10th and 15th divisions in continuous heavy fighting with British, French and American troops. On 21 August 1943, Conrath was awarded the oak leaves to his Knight's Cross for the services of the division in Africa. The HG Division was subsequently destroyed and most of its men taken captive.

From the remnants of the division, the Panzer Division Hermann Göring was formed in Italy in May 1943, being initially deployed against the Allied landing on Sicily. With this outfit, Conrath was promoted to lieutenant general (Generalleutenant) on 1 September 1943.

On 6 January 1944, the division was renamed the Fallschirm-Panzerdivision "Hermann Göring" (Parachute-Armoured Division "Hermann Göring") and later played a major role in the fighting over Monte Cassino.

On 15 April 1944, Conrath was relieved of his command in favor of Lieutenant General Wilhelm Schmalz and appointed commanding general of the training and replacement troops of Parachute Army (Fallschirm-Armee) and at the same time inspector of the Parachute Troops (Fallschirmtruppe). He did not receive a front command until the end of the war. On 1 January 1945 he was appointed General der Fallschirmtruppe. With the unconditional surrender of Nazi Germany on 8 May 1945, Conrath passed into US captivity for a brief period of time, but was soon released again.

== Awards ==
- Iron Cross (1914) 2nd and 1st Class
- German Cross in Gold on 18 May 1944 as Generalleutnant and commanding general of the Ausbildungs und Ersatz Truppen (training and replacement troops) of the 1. Fallschirm-Armee (1st Parachute Army)
- Knight's Cross of the Iron Cross with Oak Leaves
  - Knight's Cross on 4 September 1941 as Oberst and commander of Flak-Regiment (motorized) "General Göring"
  - 276th Oak Leaves on 21 August 1943 as Generalmajor and commander of Fallschirm-Panzer-Division "Hermann Göring"
- Ärmelband Afrika

Military offices
Preceded by Major Walther von Axthelm	Commander of Fallschirm-Panzer Division 1 Hermann Göring; 1 June 1940 – 14 April 1944	Succeeded by Generalmajor Wilhelm Schmalz
