= Charles of Bourbon Visiting Pope Benedict XIV at the Coffee House del Quirinale =

Painting by Giovanni Paolo Panini

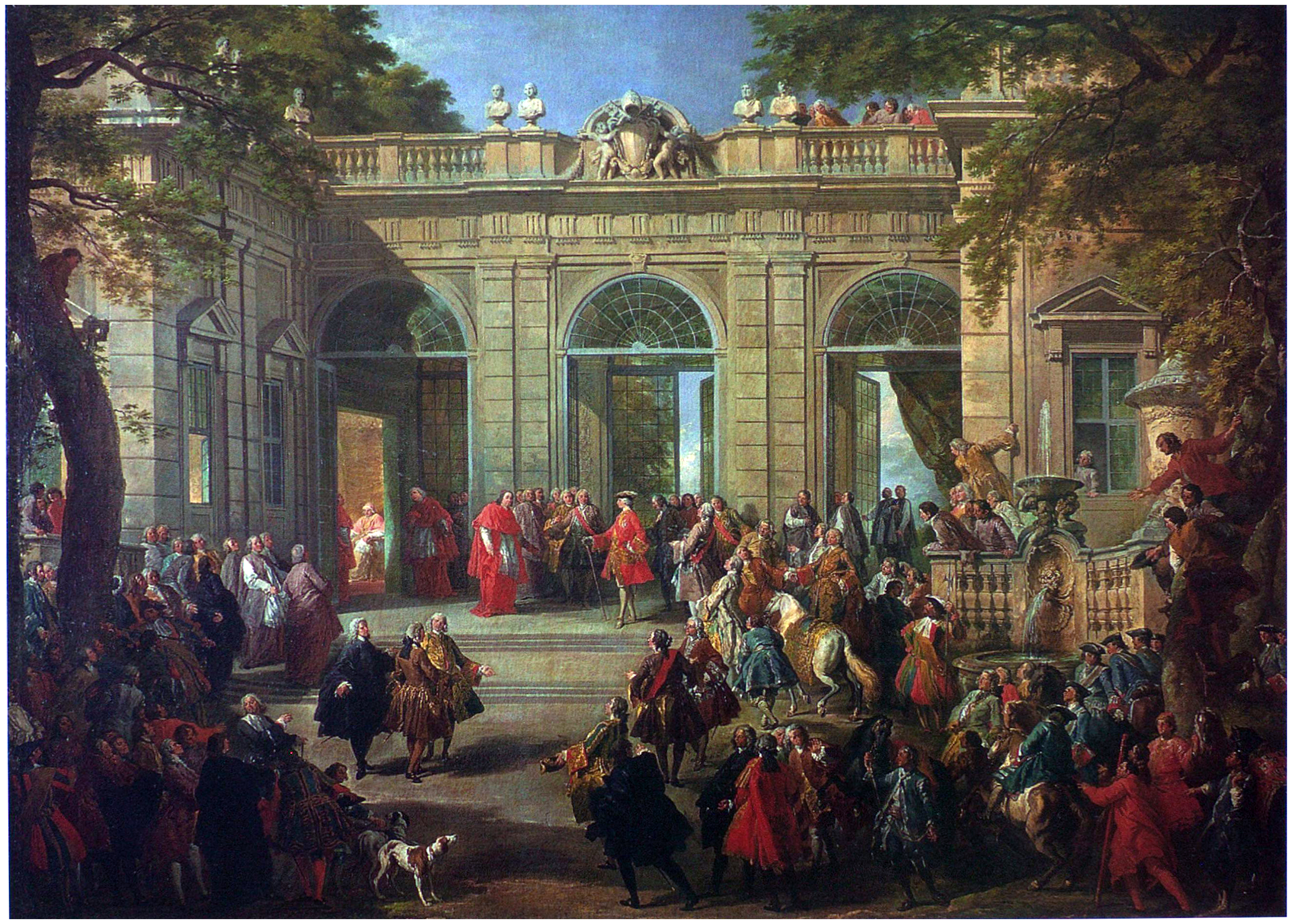
- Artist: Giovanni Paolo Panini
- Year: 1746
- Type: Oil painting on canvas
- Dimensions: 121 cm × 71 cm (48 in × 28 in)
- Location: National Museum of Capodimonte, Naples

Charles of Bourbon Visiting Pope Benedict XIV at the Coffee House del Quirinale is an oil-on-canvas painting by the Italian painter Giovanni Paolo Pannini, commissioned by Charles of Bourbon in 1746 and completed the same year. It is held at the National Museum of Capodimonte, in Naples.

== History and description ==
The painting depicts Charles' visit to Rome after the Bourbon victory over the Austrians at the Battle of Velletri in 1744 – he and Pope Benedict XIV were already friends and had signed a Concordat in 1741. Charles is seen visiting Pope Benedict XIV at the coffee-house of the Quirinal Palace. The protagonists are shown in the centre of the work; they are surrounded by a multitude of people observing the scene. In the background, the coffee-house in the Quirinal garden is painted in a way as to create a sense of depth thanks to the illusion of perspective: the tones are refined and worldly and in general it seems like the viewer is watching a theatrical scene.

== Provenance ==
It originally hung in the Capodimonte Palace in Naples and in 1806 was moved to the Palazzo degli Studi. In 1943, just before the Allied troops arrived in Naples, the German soldiers of the Hermann Goering Division took the painting and presented it to the Italian Social Republic. It was returned to Naples after the war to join the collection of the National Museum of Capodimonte, where it still hangs with its pair Charles of Bourbon Visiting St Peter's Basilica.

== Bibliography ==
- Antonio Spinosa, Salò, una storia per immagini, Segrate, Arnoldo Mondadori Editore, 1992. ISBN 978-88-043-6620-1
- Mario Sapio, Il Museo di Capodimonte, Naples, Arte'm, 2012. ISBN 978-88-569-0303-4
- Touring Club Italiano, Museo di Capodimonte, Milan, Touring Club Editore, 2012. ISBN 978-88-365-2577-5
