= Wilhelm Schmalz =

German general and Knight's Cross recipient (1901–1983)

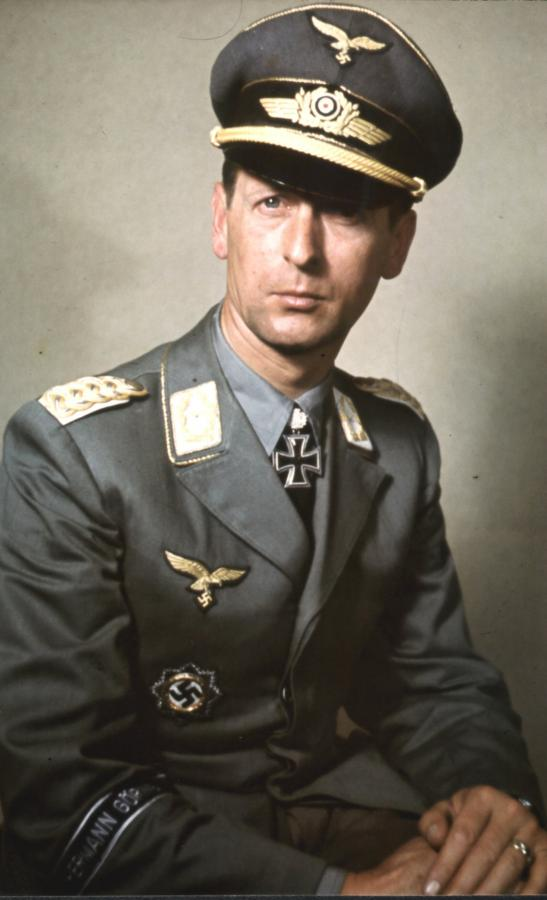
- Born: 1 March 1901; Reußen, German Empire
- Died: 14 March 1983 (aged 82); Braunfels, West Germany
- Military career
- Allegiance: Weimar Republic; Nazi Germany
- Branch: Army; Luftwaffe
- Rank: Generalleutnant
- Commands: Fallschirm-Panzer Division 1 Hermann Göring
- Conflicts: World War II
- Awards: Knight's Cross of the Iron Cross with Oak Leaves

Wilhelm Schmalz (1 March 1901 – 14 March 1983) was a German general (Generalleutnant) in the Wehrmacht during World War II and a recipient of the Knight's Cross of the Iron Cross with Oak Leaves of Nazi Germany. Schmalz surrendered to American troops in May 1945.

Schmalz was tried and acquitted of war crimes by a court in Rome on 12 July 1950. This included the Civitella in Val di Chiana massacre on 29 June 1944 where 146 civilians were murdered by soldiers of the Fallschirm-Panzer Division 1 Hermann Göring.

== Awards and decorations ==
- Iron Cross (1939) 2nd Class (14 September 1939) & 1st Class (16 October 1939)
- German Cross in Gold on 8 February 1942 as Major in Kradschützen-Bataillon 59
- Knight's Cross of the Iron Cross with Oak Leaves
  - Knight's Cross on 28 November 1940 as Major and commander of I./Kavallerie-Schützen-Regiment 11
  - 358th Oak Leaves on 23 December 1943 as Oberst and commander of Panzerbrigade z.b.V. der Panzer-Division "Hermann Göring"

Military offices
| Preceded by Oberst Paul Conrath | Commander of Fallschirm-Panzer Division 1 Hermann Göring; 16 April 1944 - 30 September 1944 | Succeeded by Generalmajor Hanns-Horst von Necker |
| Preceded by None | Commander of Fallschirm-Panzerkorps Hermann Göring; 4 October 1944 - 8 May 1945 | Succeeded by None |
