= Max Lemke =

- Born: 7 April 1895
- Died: 29 May 1985 (aged 90)
- Military career
- Allegiance: German Empire; Nazi Germany
- Branch: German Army
- Service years: 1914–1918; 1935–1945
- Rank: Generalmajor
- Commands: 7th Panzer Division; Fallschirm-Panzer Division 1 Hermann Göring
- Conflicts: World War I; World War II; Battle of France; Operation Barbarossa; Battle of Białystok–Minsk; Battle of Smolensk (1941); Battle of Moscow; Battle of Kursk; Operation Bagration; Bobruysk Offensive; Courland Pocket; East Prussian Offensive; Battle of the Oder-Neisse; Battle of Bautzen (1945)
- Awards: Knight's Cross of the Iron Cross

Max Lemke (7 April 1895 – 29 May 1985) was a German Generalmajor in the Wehrmacht during World War II, the last commander of the Fallschirm-Panzer-Division 1 „Hermann Göring“ and a recipient of the Knight's Cross of the Iron Cross of Nazi Germany. He was a POW from 12 May 1945 until 18 June 1945. After the war he was an active member of the "Ordensgemeinschaft der Ritterkreuzträger" (Association of Knight's Cross Recipients).

== Awards and decorations ==
- Iron Cross (1914) 2nd and 1st Class
- The Honour Cross of the World War 1914/1918
- Sudetenland Medal
- Iron Cross (1939) 2nd and 1st Class
- Eastern Front Medal, 1942
- Knight's Cross of the Iron Cross on 18 October 1941 as Major and commander of Aufklärungs-Abteilung 17
- German Cross in Gold on 23 June 1942 as Major and commander of Aufklärungs-Abteilung 17

== Notes ==
Military offices
Preceded by General der Panzertruppe Dr. Karl Mauss	Commander of 7. Panzer-Division; 5 January 1945 – 23 January 1945	Succeeded by General der Panzertruppe Dr. Karl Mauss
Preceded by Generalmajor Hanns-Horst von Necker	Commander of Fallschirm-Panzer Division 1 Hermann Göring; 9 February 1945 – 8 May 1945	Succeeded by None
