= Hanns-Horst von Necker =

Nazi major general (1903–1979)

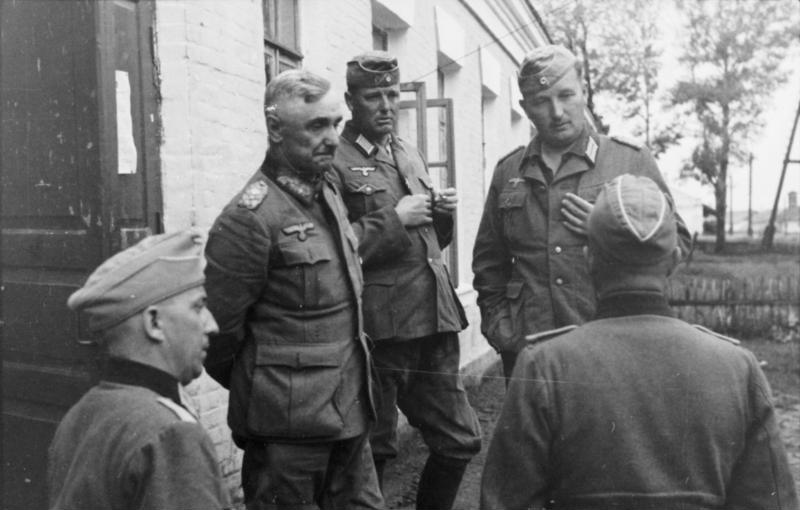
- Horst von Necker (second from right) with Generalleutnant Alfred von Hubicki (second from left) and other staff officers
- Born: 28 August 1903; Rudolstadt, German Empire
- Died: 27 February 1979 (aged 75); Bad Münstereifel, West Germany
- Military career
- Allegiance: Weimar Republic; Nazi Germany
- Branch: Army; Luftwaffe
- Rank: Generalmajor
- Commands: Fallschirm-Panzer Division 1 Hermann Göring
- Conflicts: World War II
- Awards: Knight's Cross of the Iron Cross

Hanns-Horst von Necker (28 August 1903 – 27 February 1979) was a highly decorated Generalmajor in the Luftwaffe during World War II who commanded the Fallschirm-Panzer Division 1 Hermann Göring. He was a recipient of the Knight's Cross of the Iron Cross of Nazi Germany. Necker surrendered to British forces in 1945 and was interned until 1947.

== Awards and decorations ==
- Knight's Cross of the Iron Cross on 24 June 1944 as Oberst and commander of Fallschirm-Panzergrenadier-Regiment 2 "Hermann Göring".

Military offices
Preceded by Generalmajor Wilhelm Schmalz	Commander of Fallschirm-Panzer Division 1 Hermann Göring; 1 October 1944 – 8 February 1945	Succeeded by Generalmajor Max Lemke
