= Charles of Bourbon Visiting St Peter's Basilica =

Painting by Giovanni Paolo Panini

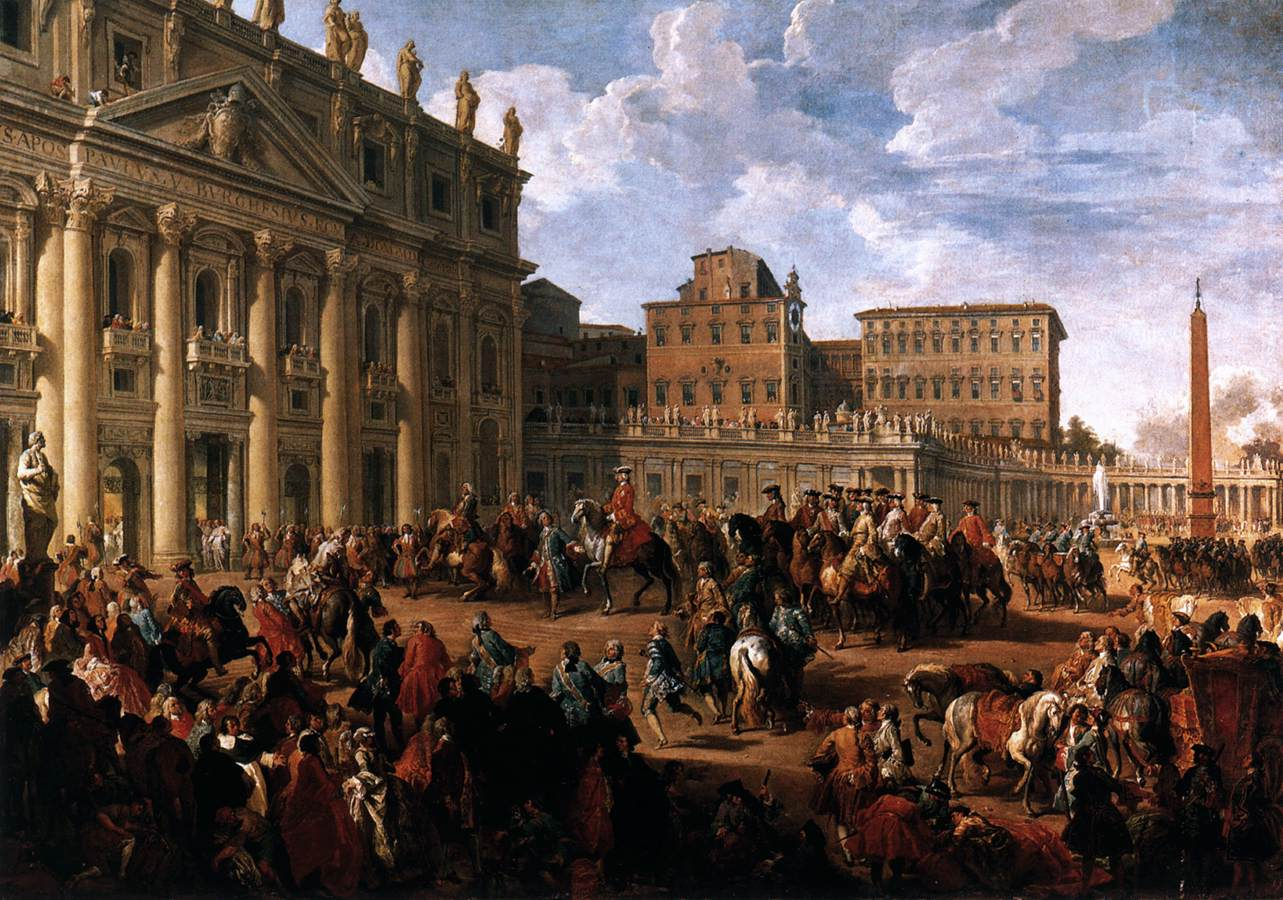
- Artist: Giovanni Paolo Panini
- Year: 1746
- Type: Oil painting on canvas
- Dimensions: 121 cm × 71 cm (48 in × 28 in)
- Location: National Museum of Capodimonte, Naples

Charles of Bourbon Visiting St Peter's Basilica is an oil-on-canvas painting by Italian artist Giovanni Paolo Pannini, commissioned by its subject Charles of Bourbon in 1746 and completed later that year. It was part of the commission as the same artist's Charles of Bourbon Visiting Pope Benedict XIV at the Coffee House del Quirinale and both works are now in the National Museum of Capodimonte in Naples.

== History and description ==
The painting portrays the visit of the king Charles III of Spain to Pope Benedict XIV, in Rome, with whom he had close friendship since the signature of the Agreement of 1741, after the victory of the Bourbon troops over the Austrian ones in 1744 in Velletri. The canvas was originally in the Capodimonte Palace, it was moved to the Palazzo degli Studi in 1806, and in 1957 returned to the newborn National Museum of Capodimonte, where it is exhibited in room 32, in the area of the Royal Apartment.

The painting depicts King Charles III on horseback, showing a brilliant and worldly enthusiasm, followed by the greatest personalities of Spain, in front of the facade of St. Peter's Basilica in the Vatican. The painter himself was an eyewitness to this event. At the center of the work are depicted the leading figures, surrounded by a multitude of people, with the aim of giving even greater prominence to the main scene, while in the background, the papal palaces are painted in a way as to create a perspective illusion.

== Bibliography ==
- Mario Sapio, Il Museo di Capodimonte, Naples, Arte'm, 2012. ISBN 978-88-569-0303-4
- Touring Club Italiano, Museo di Capodimonte, Milan, Touring Club Editore, 2012. ISBN 978-88-365-2577-5
