= 1st Fallschirm-Panzer Division Hermann Göring =

German elite Luftwaffe armoured division

1st Paratroop Panzer Division Hermann Göring
- Fallschirm-Panzer-Division 1. Hermann Göring
- Divisional insignia
- Active: 1933–1945 (in General); June 1943–8 May 1945 (as a Panzer Division)
- Country: Nazi Germany
- Branch: Luftwaffe
- Type: Fallschirmjäger; Panzer
- Role: Airborne forces, Armoured warfare
- Size: Regiment; Brigade; Division; Corps
- Patron: Hermann Göring
- Colors: White
- Engagements: Occupation of Czechoslovakia; World War II; Norwegian campaign; Battle of France; Tunisian campaign; Gela Beachhead; Eastern Front; Battle of Radzymin; Battle of Studzianki; Battle of Bautzen

Commanders
- Notable commanders: Walther von Axthelm; Paul Conrath; Wilhelm Schmalz; Hanns-Horst von Necker; Max Lemke

Insignia
- Identification symbol: Fallschirm-Panzer-Div 1 HG
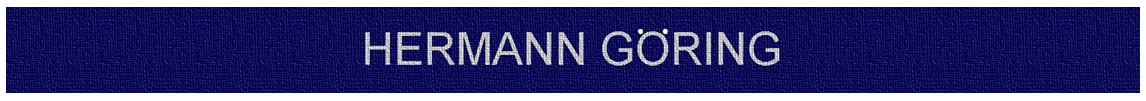
- Cuff title Hermann Göring

The Fallschirm-Panzer-Division 1. Hermann Göring ("1st Paratroop Tank Division 'Hermann Göring'" – abbreviated as 'Fallschirm-Panzer-Div 1 HG') was a German elite Luftwaffe armoured division. The HG saw action in France, North Africa, Sicily, Italy and on the Eastern Front during World War II. The division began as a battalion-sized police unit in 1933. Over time it grew into a regiment, brigade, division, and finally was combined with the Parachute-Panzergrenadier Division 2 Hermann Göring on 1 May 1944 to form a Panzer corps under the name Reichsmarschall. It surrendered to the Red Army near Dresden on 8 May 1945.

Initially staffed by volunteers recruited from Nazi organizations such as the Hitler Youth, it later received intakes from the Heer (especially panzer troops) and conscripts of the Luftwaffe. The unit was stationed in Berlin in the newly built Hermann Göring barracks (today's Julius Leber Barracks) and in Velten; being named after the 'Reichsmarschall' and Commander-in-Chief of the Luftwaffe Hermann Göring. This naming was intended to establish a close connection between Wehrmacht units and Nazism, while at the same time consolidating domestic power within the party hierarchy. Among its combat missions, the Hermann Göring maintained guard forces, such as a guard in the Reichsmarschall's estate at Carinhall and the Flak defense of Hitler's headquarters and personal train.

The division, during its time in Italy, committed a number of war crimes, and, together with the 16th SS Panzergrenadier Division Reichsführer-SS, was disproportionately involved in massacres of the civilian population, the two divisions accounting for approximately one-third of all civilians killed in war crimes in Italy.

== Formation ==
=== Establishment and initial phase – police administration ===
Command flag of the chief of the police (Ordnungspolizei).

When Hitler, of the National Socialist German Workers' Party (NSDAP), was appointed Reich Chancellor on January 30, 1933, Captain Hermann Göring was appointed the Prussian Minister of the Interior in February 1933. This gave him the supreme command of the entire Prussian police and a general's rank.

On February 24, 1933, Göring established the Polizeiabteilung z. b. V. Wecke (z. b. V. meaning "for special use"). His intention was to create a police association that was loyal to the NSDAP regime. The outfit was named after its commander Major der Schutzpolizei Walther Wecke, a veteran of the First World War and a member of the NSDAP. Numbering 400 men, it was stationed in the Kreuzberg district of Berlin, a notoriously left-wing working-class area.

The battalion soon became notorious for its brutal practices. In cooperation with the Gestapo, which was also under Göring's control, the Special Duties Police Battalion was involved in many attacks against Communists and Social Democrats and was responsible for the arrest of opponents of the regime.

In June 1933, Göring enlarged the battalion and placed it under the command of the state police (Landespolizei), becoming the Landespolizeigruppe Wecke z. b. V. (Special Duties State Police Group Wecke), and then Landespolizeigruppe General Göring in January 1934. In the same month, under pressure from Hitler and Himmler, Göring gave Himmler's SS control of the Gestapo. To reinforce the position of his remaining unit, Göring increased its size and instituted a military training program. During the Night of the Long Knives, Hitler resorted to both Göring's state police group and Himmler's Leibstandarte SS Adolf Hitler, who executed many Sturmabteilung (SA) leaders, thus removing the formation as a threat to the NSDAP.

=== Air Force control – early missions ===
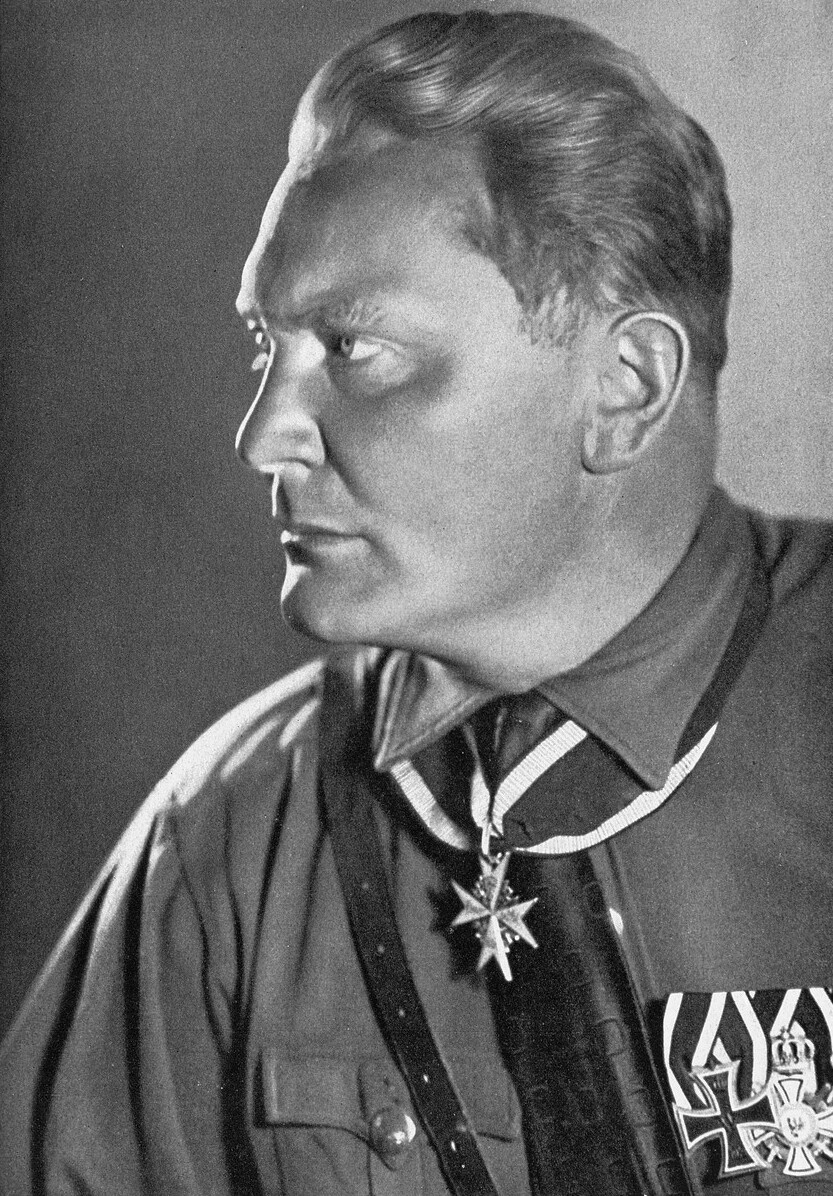
Hermann Göring, the unit's namesake

In 1935 Göring was appointed Commander-in-Chief of the Air Force. Since he wanted to keep control of his "favorite unit", it was transferred to the Luftwaffe in September 1935 and renamed the Regiment General Göring.

The regimental order of battle:

- Regimentstab (HQ staff)
- Musikkorps (military band)
- I.Jäger-Bataillon (light infantry)
- II.Jäger-Bataillon
- 13.Kradschützen-Kompanie (motorcyclists)
- 15.Pionier-Kompanie (engineers)
- Reiterzug (cavalry platoon)
- Nachrichtenzug (signals platoon)

At the beginning of 1936 the regiment was ready to fight again. At that time all organized resistance against the NSDAP had been eliminated. During this time, the regiment served Göring as a personal bodyguard and covered Hitler's headquarters with its anti-aircraft guns. During this time the I. (Jäger-) Bataillon/RGG and the 15th Pioneer Company (15. Pionier-Kompanie) were assigned to the Döberitz Aviation School for parachute training; at the end of 1937 these units were renamed I.Fallschirmschützen-Bataillon (Parachute Rifle Battalion). The battalion was separated from the regiment in March 1938, sent to the training grounds of Stendal and transformed into the I./Fallschirmjäger-Regiment 1, the first paratrooper unit of the Wehrmacht.

The regiment participated in the so-called Blumenkrieg (Flower Wars), taking part in the annexation of Austria (Anschluss); being among the first units to cross the border. Two companies landed by Junkers Ju 52/3m transport planes at Aspern Airport near Vienna. The unit remained in-country for several weeks on duty in Wiener Neustadt. The Regiment General Göring was also involved in the occupation of the Sudetenland in October 1938 and the occupation of the rest of Czechoslovakia in March 1939; after which, the regiment undertook guard duties at the strategically important Skoda vehicle works.

=== Training and selection ===
Special troop flag of the 1st battalion of the Regiment "General Göring".

The Regiment General Göring intended for its ranks to be filled with selected personnel to square off with its competitors, the Army's élite Infanterie-Regiment "Großdeutschland" and the Waffen-SS Leibstandarte-SS Adolf Hitler. Among the criteria for acceptance in the regiment:

- Age of 18–25 years old,
- Minimum height of 1.68m (5 ft 6ins),
- German citizenship,
- Eligibility for military service,
- Fitness for active service,
- Aryan ancestry,
- Unmarried status,
- Clean police record and no charges pending,
- Confirmed open support for the National Socialist state.

During the wars years a further requirement was added: the volunteer would have to sign up for 12 years service. Those conditions were much the same as those demanded for ingress into the Großdeutschland and the Leibstandarte. As the war progressed and the scale of combat losses mounted, such restrictive criteria could not be sustained in any of these élite formations. Many Luftwaffe personnel would simply be drafted into the Hermann Göring from other units to replace combat losses.

With high caliber recruits, the regiment occupied a brand new purpose-built barracks complex at Berlin-Reinickendorf, which was constructed to the highest standards and with the most modern of facilities for the time. The complex boasted over 120 buildings and included gymnasia, outdoor and indoor swimming pools, sports areas and its own post office. The sharply dressed General Göring soldiers, in their distinctive uniforms with white collar patches and special unit cuffband (Ärmelstreifen), became a regular sight on the streets of Berlin.

By 1939, the regiment had grown considerably. Troops of the regiment took part in many of the great pre-war parades through Berlin. They provided guards for Reichsmarschall Hermann Göring's own headquarters, the changing of the guard often being performed with all due ceremony including the presence of the regiment's own military band. The regiment also undertook guard duties at Göring's private retreat, the sumptuous Carinhall estate - named after Göring's deceased first wife, Carin Axelina Hulda Göring.

The regimental order of battle on the eve of WW2 was:

- Regimentstab
- Musikkorps
- Stabsbatterie (HQ artillery battery)
- I.(schwere) Flak-Abteilung (heavy AA artillery battalion)
- II.(leichte) Flak-Abteilung (light AA artillery battalion)
- Scheinwerfer-Abteilung (searchlight battalion)
- IV.(leichte) Flak-Abteilung
- Wachbataillon (guard infantry battalion)
  - Reiterschwadron (cavalry squadron)
  - 9.Wachkompanie (infantry)
  - 10.Wachkompanie
  - 11.Wachkompanie
- Reserve-Scheinwerfer-Abteilung
- Ersatz-Abteilung (replacement training battalion)
- (schwere) Eisenbahn Flak-Batterie (heavy railway AA battery)
- (leichte) Flak-Batterie (light AA battery)

== Combat history ==
German invasion of Denmark, 1940.

=== Blitzkrieg in the West ===
During the attack on Poland, which marked the beginning of World War II, only a small part of the Regiment General Göring (RGG) was involved in the fighting. Most of the unit remained in Berlin to protect Göring's headquarters and the Reichshauptstadt. During the Phoney War parts of the regiment formed an infantry battalion and took part in Operation Weserübung against Denmark and Norway in the spring of 1940; with the largest part of the RGG relocated to the west on the German-Dutch border under the camouflage designations "Flak-Regiment 101" and "Flak-Regiment 103".

In April, a detachment under Hauptmann Kluge was sent to Denmark. Composed of a company of the Wachbataillon, a 2cm self-propelled Flak-Batterie and a Kradschützen-Kompanie, it took part in the seizure of the airfield and radio station at Esbjerg and the securing of the coastline of Jutland. The detachment was then transferred by sea to Oslo, in Norway, being engaged alongside the Army first in the advance to Trondheim, then north up into the Arctic Circle to take the port of Bodo and relieve the pressure on the beleaguered élite Gebirgsjäger further north at Narvik. At first the German forces were pushed back by the Allies, with General Eduard Dietl making a fighting retreat and retiring along Beisfjord. With Fall Gelb initiated, the Allies evacuated Norway to concentrate on Flanders, leaving Narvik to the Germans. After completing its mission, Kluge's detachment was sent back home to Berlin.

As part of the Western campaign, the RGG took part in the invasion of the Netherlands and Belgium. During the campaign the Eben-Emael fortress in Belgium was taken by paratroopers under Captain Walther Koch, many of whom had previously served in the Regiment General Göring - including Koch himself. The RGG took part in the crossing of the Maas and the advance into eastern Belgium. There it crossed the Albert Canal against stiff resistance and took part in the capture of Brussels.

After the surrender of the Netherlands, the regiment was divided into several small combat groups (Kampfgruppen), which were assigned to the panzer divisions that spearheaded the attack on France. The anti-aircraft troops were particularly noted for their efficacy, with the superb 8.8cm anti-aircraft of the heavy batteries often used to fight tanks and the 3rd and 5th batteries of the RGG destroyed 18 French tanks at pointblank range during a battle in the Forest of Mormal, breaking their counterattack; the crews of the guns Casar and Dona kept firing at the French heavy tanks at 15 meters.

The Regiment General Göring was rewarded for its excellent performance by forming part of the honour guard of the Führer-Begleit-Kompanie (Führer's Escort Company) for the formal armistice at Compiègne on 21 June 1940. After the capitulation of France, the RGG provided Flak defences in bunkers on the Channel coast as well as contributing to the anti-aircraft defence ring around Paris. The new regimental commander was Colonel Paul Conrath in June 1940, who was to lead the regiment and the later division until 1944. At the end of 1940 the regiment was transferred back to Berlin to resume its old job as a bodyguard and air defense unit.

=== The invasion of the USSR ===
Göring had been appointed Reichsmarschall in 1940. At the beginning of 1941 the unit was motorized and renamed Regiment (mot.) Hermann Göring. When Germany joined hostilities in the Balkans in April 1941, the motorized regiment was sent to Romania for intended attachment to Generaloberst Wilhelm List's 12.Armee; instead it was held in reserve and placed in the air defense of the strategic oil fields at Ploesti. In preparation for the invasion of the Soviet Union in June 1941 the regiment had been moved into positions along the River Bug, the dividing line between the German and Soviet occupation zones of Poland; forming part II. Flak-Korps of Panzergruppe von Kleist.

Organization as of 15 June 1941:

- Regimental Staff (Colonel Paul Conrath)
- Nachrichtenzug (signals platoon)
- Werkstattzug (Workshop train)
- Ammunition supply column 25t
- I. Abteilung (Flak) (Major Hullmann)
  - 1. Batterie (4 × 8.8 cm)
  - 2. Batterie (4 × 8.8 cm)
  - 3. Batterie (4 × 8.8 cm)
  - 5. Batterie (12 × 2 cm)
- IV. Abteilung (Flak) (Captain Geicke)
  - 6. Batterie (9 × 3.7 cm)
  - 15. Batterie (6 × 2 cm, 6 × 3.7 cm)
  - 16. Batterie mot S. Ketten (12 × 2 cm)
- Schützen-Bataillon (Captain Funck)
  - 8. Batterie mot. S. Räder (12 × 2 cm)
  - 1. Schützen-Kompanie
  - 3. Schützen-Kompanie
  - Kradschützen-Kompanie
- II. / Flak-Regiment 43 (Major Karlhuber)
  - 6. Batterie (4 × 8.8 cm)
  - 7. Batterie (4 × 8.8 cm)
  - 8. Batterie (4 × 8.8 cm)
  - 9. Batterie (4 × 8.8 cm)
  - 10. Batterie (12 × 2 cm)
- Reinforced supply column division I./200 (Major Buchmann)

During Operation Barbarossa, the regiment was attached to the 11th Panzer Division, a part of Army Group South. The regiment saw action in the initial breakthrough and the advance via Radziechów, where the Flak crews once again showed remarkable performance against enemy tanks. The unit then drove towards Dubno, fighting in the tank battle of Brody in Ukraine, against Soviet T-34 and KV tanks; with the 11th Panzer Division being momentarily cut-off by Soviet armoured forces. The regiment then took part in the encirclement of Kiev and the Battle of Bryansk. These battles were hard-fought and the regiment took significant losses, albeit reinforcing the unit's growing reputation for steadfastness in combat. At the end of 1941, the regiment was moved back to Germany for rest and refitting, with the Schützen-Bataillon Hermann Göring remaining at the front until May 1942. At the same time, a newly formed II.Schützen-Bataillon was sent to the Eastern Front, where it was all but decimated in extremely heavy-fighting around Juchnow and Anissowo-Goroditsche.

At the end of the Battle of Uman, the encircled Soviet forces attempted a desperate breakout by night, running into the 16th batterie of the Flak Regiment Hermann Göring, under Oberleutnant Karl Rossmann (aka Batterie Roßmann) and with a handful of infantry including troops from the SS-Division "Wiking" between Uman and Slatopol near the town of Swerdlikowo. The Rossman's formation held out for 14 hours against all attacks, thus playing a major role in ensuring the destruction of Soviet 6th, 12th and elements of the 18th Armies. For this action Rossmann received the Knight's Cross on 12 September 1941.

Back in Germany, the Flak elements in the Reich took positions in Munich where they contributed to the city's air defence for a short period, before being moved near Paris, remaining there into the spring of 1942.

=== Expansion to division ===
In May–July 1942 the regiment was expanded to brigade size and renamed Brigade Hermann Göring, under Generalmajor Paul Conrath and during this period undertook general occupation and security duties in France.

Brigade order of battle:

- Stabskompanie (staff company)
- I.Schützen-Regiment (1–4 infantry companies)
- II.Schützen-Regiment (5–8 infantry companies, 9th heavy weapons company)
- III.Schützen-Regiment (10th motorized, 11th armoured engineer and 13th anti-tank companies)
- Flak-Regiment
  - I.Flak-Abteilung (3 heavy and 3 light batteries)
  - II.Flak-Abteilung (3 heavy, 2 light and 1 howitzer batteries)
  - III.Flak-Abteilung (3 batteries)
  - IV.(Führer) Abteilung (3 batteries, provided Flak cover at Hitler's HQ)
- Musikkorps
- Wachbataillon (3 companies)
- Ersatz-Abteilung

In October 1942, when the brigade was still being reformed in Brittany, it was decided to expand the HG to division size, entitled Division Hermann Göring, whereby it should be structured according to the guidelines of a tank division of the army. Göring arranged for experienced army tank crews to be assigned to his division and reinforced the infantry with up to 5,000 paratroopers - including remnants of the Fallschirmjäger-Regiment 5 (FJ-Regt 5), decimated in the airborne Battle of Crete. The formation of the divisional elements was carried out at numerous locations in France, Holland and back at regimental depot in Berlin. A number of Luftwaffe personnel was detached to the Army for training with Panzer units.

The FJ-Regt 5 was set up in May 1942 on the training area of Groß-Born with 3 battalions, with the staff and the 1st battalion newly formed, the 2nd and 3rd battalions formed by the 2nd and 3rd battalions of the Luftlande-Sturm-Regiment 1 (also called Sturm-Regiment Koch); coming back from the Eastern Front and being augmented by replacements. In July 1942 the I. and III. Bataillonen were sent to the Mourmelon military training area for further training, southeast of Reims. The 2nd Battalion was subordinated to the Ramcke Parachute Brigade under Major Friedrich Hübner for use in northern France.

Paper strength of main divisional combat units:

- Grenadier-Regiment 1 "HG" (3 battalions, 1 heavy weapons company, 1 AT company)
- Grenadier-Regiment 2 "HG" (3 battalions, 1 heavy weapons company, 1 AT company)
- Jäger-Regiment "HG" (2 battalions, former FJ-Regt 5)
- Panzer-Regiment "HG" (2 battalions)
- Flak-Regiment "HG" (3 battalions plus Führer-Flak-Abteilung)
- Artillerie-Regiment "HG" (4 battalions plus V.Sturmgeschütz-Abteilung, later transferred to Pz-Regt "HG" as III.Abt)
- Aufklärungs-Abteilung "HG" (reconnaissance)
- Panzer-Pionier-Abteilung "HG" (armoured engineers)
- Panzer-Nachrichten-Abteilung "HG" (armoured signals)

This expansion was interrupted by the sudden Allied landings in French North Africa in Operation Torch, with Nazi Germany invading the French Free Zone in November 1942. At the time, the bulk of the division was located in the area around Mont-de-Marsan, where it continued its training and working up. Those sub-units nearest to being fully formed were gradually moved down into Italy while the remainder stayed in southern France.

=== Afrikakorps ===
From 10 November 1942, the paratroopers being transferred from FJ-Regt 5 were moved by train to Italy and by plane via Sicily to Tunisia, being assigned to support the 10th Panzer Division. Immediately after landing, the regiment was moved to defensive positions west and south-west of Tunis and occupied the important bridges over the Madjerda River. Around 20 November 1942, the regiment was engaged in heavy fighting against the tank-led attacks by the Americans coming from Algeria at Medjez El Bab. Those were beaten back until the superior enemy pressure forced the regiment to give up the position on 25 November.

The bulk of the Hermann Göring Division, still not fully organized, was despatched piecemeal to Tunisia in February–March 1943 forming a combat group numbering 7,000-11,000 thousand men under command of Colonel Joseph Schmid; who was promoted to Generalmajor shortly after. This Kampfgruppe Schmid was committed into battle dispersed and attached to various Army units, and they quickly earned a reputation for aggression in the attack and reliability under fire. Under the title of Division Hermann Göring, the combat group was commended in official Wehrmacht communiqués in April 1943 for their "exemplary fighting spirit and intrepid valour".

When Axis forces surrendered on 12 May 1943, almost all of the remainder of the Kampfgruppe was taken into captivity, including its most experienced veterans. Some 400 Hermann Göring soldiers were killed in action in Tunisia.

=== Sicily ===
General Joseph Schmid and a few of his men escaped to mainland Italy, on Göring's express orders, before the surrender. These survivors would join the newly reformed division entitled Panzer-Division Hermann Göring. Generalmajor Schmid was awarded the Knight's Cross on 21 May 1944 for his leadership of the HG Kampfgruppe in Tunisia.

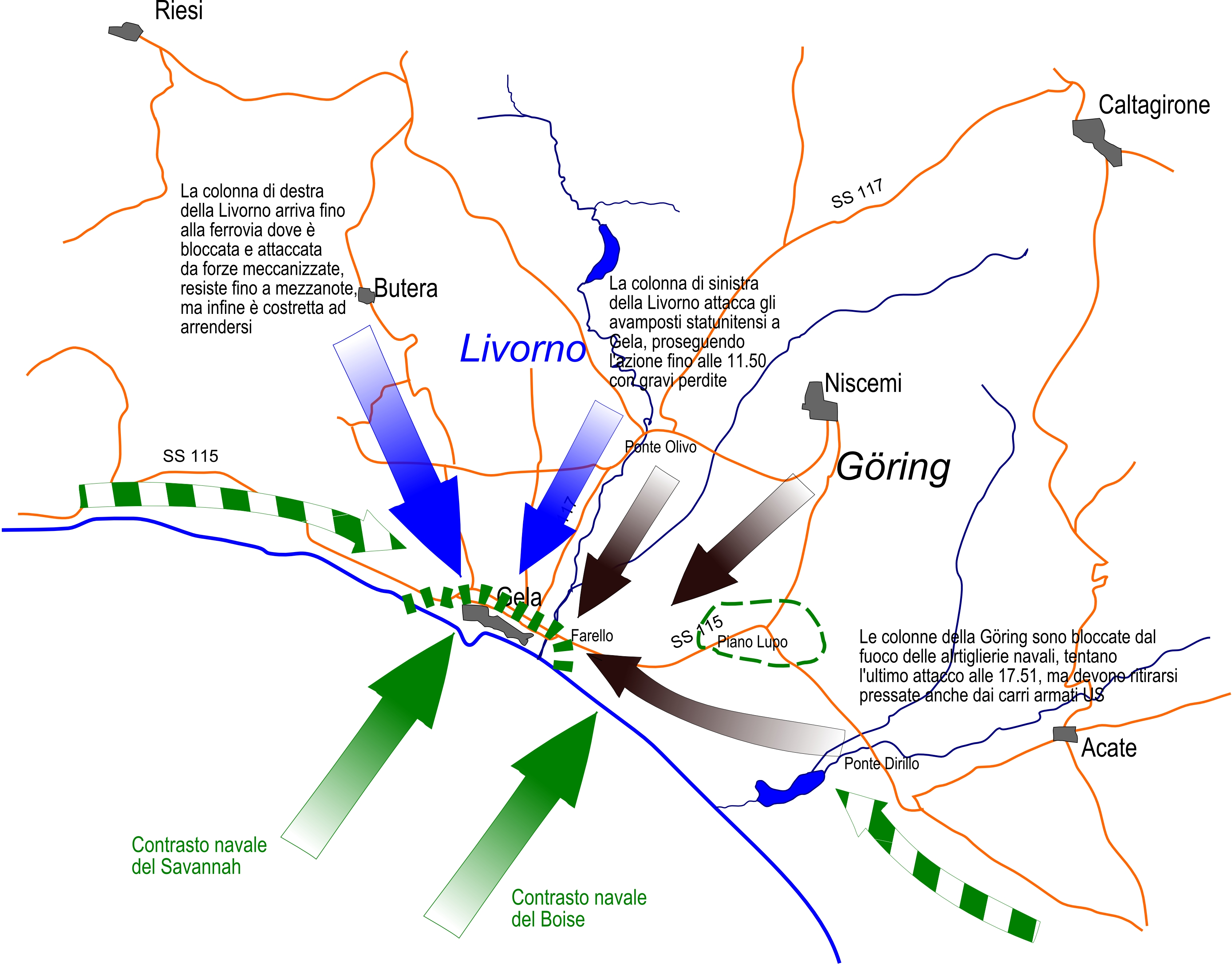
The counterattack of Italian and German forces on the Gela beachhead on 11 July 1943.

The new division, meanwhile, was built around those scattered elements still working up in France, the Netherlands and Germany, which now gathered in the Naples area. Efforts to mould these troops into a cohesive fighting force went ahead urgently, as the Germans expected an Allied invasion of Sicily. Over the next few weeks, HG troops would cross over to the island; this new extremely powerful armoured division being ready in June 1943, taking positions around Caltagirone. The divisional order of battle in Sicily was:

- Divisionsstab (divisional HQ)
- Panzer-Regiment "HG" (2 tank battalions, 1 assault gun battalion)
- Panzergrenadier-Regiment 1 "HG" (3 mechanized infantry battalions)
- Panzergrenadier-Regiment 2 "HG" (3 mechanized infantry battalions)
- Panzer-Aufklärungs-Abteilung "HG" (armoured reconnaissance battalion)
- Flak-Regiment "HG" (2, later 3 battalions)
- Panzer-Artillerie-Regiment "HG" (3, later 4 battalions plus attachments)
- Panzer-Pionier-Abteilung "HG" (armoured engineers)
- Panzer-Nachrichten-Abteilung "HG" (armoured signals)
- Feldersatz-Bataillon"HG" (replacement and training)
- Divisions-Kampfschule (combat school company)
- Nachschub-Abteilung "HG" (supply battalion)
- Instandsetzungs-Abteilung "HG" (repair workshop battalion)
- Verwaltungstruppe "HG" (administrative troops)
- Sanitäts-Abteilung "HG" (medical battalion)

Operation Husky was initiated on 10 July 1943, and saw the Hermann Göring and the 15th Panzergrenadier divisions surrounded by mostly third-rate Italian units, geared to coastal defense and equipped with 38 obsolete Fiat 3000 light tanks. The only Italian mobile division was the 4th Mountain Infantry Division Livorno, supported by the Italian Mobile Group E equipped with 12 Renault R 35 light tanks under Captain Giuseppe Granieri; they were joined on the afternoon of the first day by 9,000 troops of the Panzer-Division Hermann Göring with 46 Panzer III and 32 Panzer IV medium tanks coming from Caltagirone, and reinforced with a battalion of the 15th Panzergrenadiers (III. / Panzergrenadier-Regiment 129).

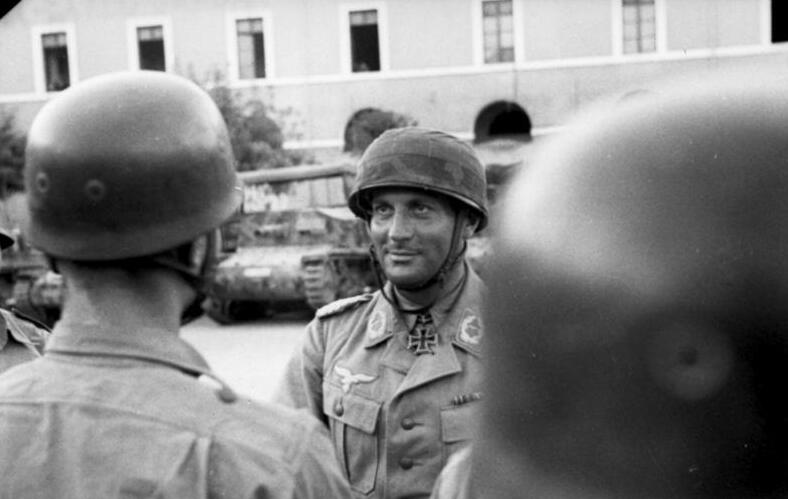
Major Walter Gericke, commander of the Fallschirmjäger-Regiment 11 (Fsch.Jäg.Rgt. 11, part of the 2nd Fallschirmjäger Division), with his paratroopers in an Italian village with captured Italian armour in the background, 11 September 1943. Gericke commanded a company in the Fallschirmschützen-Bataillon of the Regiment "General Göring".

The Germans and Italians engaged in counter-attacks at the amphibious Battle of Gela on 10 and 11 July, being forced back by heavy Allied naval bombardment. On 11 July 1943, after a 10-minute artillery preparation, the Italian Livorno Division attacked the US Rangers in three columns from the west side of the Gela River, supported by obsolescent Renault R 35 light tanks, while the Hermann Göring Division attacked the 1st Infantry Division beachhead on the east side of the Gela River. The attack was contained and then abandoned. The Germans reinforced Sicily with the 29th Panzergrenadier Division, a veteran of Stalingrad flown in from mainland Italy, and the 1st Fallschirmjäger Division brought from France. The HG Division then engaged into heavy street fighting from 2–4 August with the British Battleaxe Division in the city of Centuripe, retreating to Messina afterward. The Allies steadily pushed the Axis back and the Hermann Göring formed part of the rearguard, providing cover to German units being evacuated to mainland Italy; being one of the last German units leaving Sicily. Surprisingly, despite the heavy fighting in which it had been involved, and the intensive bombing of the port of Messina through which it was being withdrawn, the bulk of the HG troops and most of its heavy equipment were successfully evacuated.

=== Italy ===
The division was stationed near Naples to rest and refit but was almost immediately put into alert due to the Armistice of Cassibile. On 3 September 1943, the British landed in Calabria and five days later the Italian government surrendered to the Allies. Berlin quickly implemented a contingency plan to occupy strategic points in the peninsula and to disarm Italian troops - Operation Achse. The following day, on 9 September, the US 5th Army landed in Salerno and successfully established a beachhead. German efforts to destroy said beachhead lasted for nine days. The Hermann Göring Panzer Division fought in General Hube's XIV Panzer Corps beside 16th Panzer and 15th Panzergrenadier divisions, fighting hard but being progressively pushed back by the Allies under heavy naval and air firepower. The HG pulled back into Naples, where it held on tenaciously until finally giving up the devastated port on 1 October, withdrawing to positions on the Volturno-Termoli line.

In this new positions, the Hermann Göring and the 15th Panzergrenadier put up a spirited defence, gaining essential time for the main defences of the Gustav Line to be prepared. This defensive network ran from Gaeta on the west coast to Ortona on the east, with its western end blocking the Liri Valley - the gateway to Rome. The retreating Germans employed highly successful delaying actions: sappers destroyed bridges, mined roads and demolished buildings while infantry, artillery and panzers fought stubborn rearguard actions. Those measures ensured the Allied advance to be slow and costly, gaining time for the arrival of winter and the stabilization of the front. With the coming of the autumn rains the bulk of the HG was then pulled back to rest in new reserve positions around Frosinone. Elements coming mostly from the Flak and Panzer-Artillery regiments remained at the front and were involved in heavy winter fighting until relieved in January 1944.

=== Monte Cassino ===
With the Allies pushing further north, the ancient Benedictine monastery of Monte Cassino was facing almost certain destruction of countless priceless treasures; its strategically dominating position as the western anchor of the Gustav Line would necessarily place the abbey amid the heavy fighting for the possession of the terrain. The commander of the division's repair workshop battalion, Oberstleutnant Julius Schlegel, approached the abbot to offer his assistance in transporting the treasures to safety in the Vatican. A cultured man endowed with great artistic feeling, in the interwar period Schlegel had run a bookshop in Vienna, his hometown. After much persuasion and with the sounds of battle drawing ever nearer, the monks agreed to Schlegel's offer, and the division's vehicles were used to secure the works of art, including paintings by Leonardo da Vinci, Titian and Raphael, and the remains of Benedict of Nursia, in Castel Sant'Angelo in Rome. In this way they escaped destruction when the abbey was attacked in the Battle of Monte Cassino.

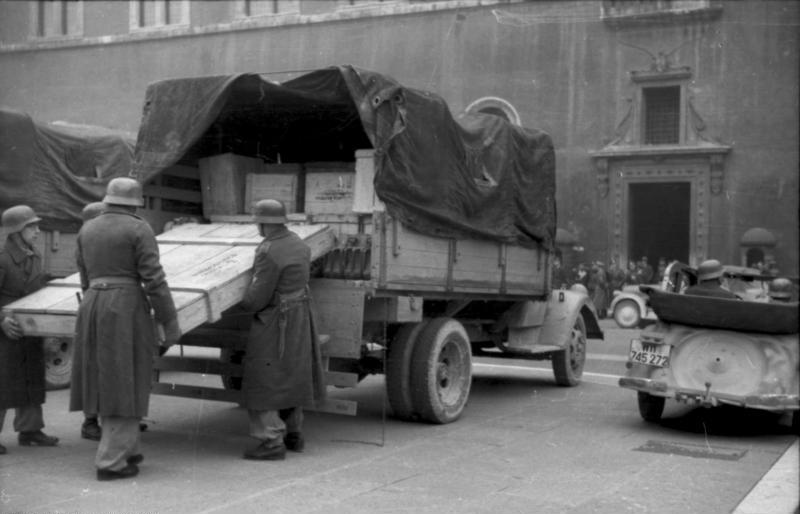
The works of art packed in wooden boxes are loaded onto a truck.

Over three weeks the HG trucks made the voyage to Rome. Then, an Allied radio broadcast accused troops of the Hermann Göring Division of looting the abbey. Given Göring's reputation as a plunderer of Europe's art treasures, the suspicion was reasonable. Also, Schlegel had not informed his commander, Conrath, of the operation and the colonel's unauthorised use of military assets (vehicles and men) on a non-military matter, without direct relation to the war effort, could have resulted in his court martial and even execution. A detachment of Waffen-SS Feldgendarmerie (field police) was dispatched to the abbey with the intention of arresting the "looters", and had to be persuaded by the monks that Schlegel was helping them - not robbing them. After Schlegel admitted to General Conrath he was using 20 trucks for purposes unrelated to advancing the war and explained why, Conrath consented to the operation. Now with the full backing of Conrath, the remaining treasures were transported to safety (including the sacred relic of Saint Benedict). In gratitude, the monks of Monte Cassino held a special mass and awarded Julius Schlegel an illuminated scroll certificate in Latin which reads:

In the name of our Lord Jesus Christ. The Cassinians thank the illustrious and beloved officer Julius Schlegel, who saved the monks and property of the holy monastery of Cassino, with all their hearts and ask God for his continued well-being. Signed Gregorius Dimare, O.S.B, Bishop and Abbot.

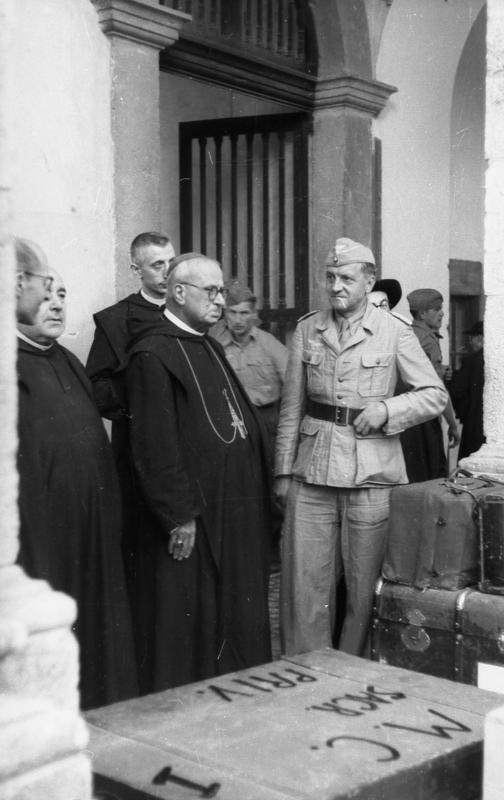
Soldiers of the division with Bishop Gregorio Vito Diamare, Abbot of Monte Cassino Abbey

Conrath is described by a rather idiosyncratic translation of "Leader of a tank division" into Latin as Dux ferreae legionis.

In July 1944, Lieutenant Colonel Schlegel was wounded in an air raid in the Bologna region, losing one foot, and thus ending his participation in the conflict. Nevertheless, he was arrested by the Allies after the war on charges of looting, and held in prison for over seven months before the personal intervention of British Field Marshal Harold Alexander.

By saving the art treasures and the library as well as the construction plans, the reconstruction of the destroyed monastery was later possible. Schlegel was found by Pope Pius XII in the early 1950s and invited to a special audience. There is also a memorial plaque dedicated to the Austrian at Pokornygasse 5 in Vienna, and a memorial not far from it in Wertheimstein Park in the Vienna district of Oberdöbling on a natural slope towards the Danube Canal.

=== Further fighting in Italy ===
As the Allies kept pushing against the mountainous defences of the Gustav Line, the HG left the reserve and moved south against the British 8th Army on the Garigliano River. On 22 January 1944, the US Army landed at Anzio and Nettuno, north of the Gustav Line's western end, taking the Germans completely by surprise. Generalfeldmarschall Albert Kesselring despatched units to block the beachhead, among them elements of the Hermann Göring. The beachhead was successfully contained and put under such pressure the Allies had to shift reserves from the Cassino sector.

The division fought in the Battle of Cisterna, on the German left flank, facing the US 3rd Infantry Division and the 1st and 3rd Ranger battalions. After a night infiltration, the Rangers were counterattacked by the HG and 715 Infantry divisions, resulting in 700 US prisoners being captured. The HG was then retired to Tuscany to reform.

In February 1944, the Hermann Göring was redesignated Fallschirm-Panzer-Division (Parachute Armoured Division). The new designation was merely honoric, involving minimal alteration to the unit's structure or capability. On 14 April, General Conrath stepped down, the command passing to Generalmajor Wilhelm Schmalz.

In May 1944, the Allies managed the break-out of the Anzio-Nettuno bridgehead and captured Monte Cassino after its outflanking by the French Expeditionary Corps, and started advancing up the Liri Valley. With Rome threatened and the 10. Armee retreating, the Hermann Göring was ordered to march to the Velletri sector of the front, which was done in broad daylight despite the total Allied air superiority. The German columns were badly mauled by relentless attacks by fighter-bombers. From June 4, the retreat passed through the Italian capital, which had been declared an "open city" in order to avoid its destruction. Although the division was initially able to hold the Allied advance, it was eventually forced into retreat, pulling back to positions on the Aniene River, east of Rome, in early June; being mentioned again in the official Wehrmacht communiqués by exemplary conduct in the face of overwhelming odds. On July 4, the division carried out a massacre of residents of the town of Cavriglia, killing 180 civilians. By July the division had been forced back to positions south of Florence; being pulled out of Italy altogether on 15 July 1944.

=== Corps size and defeat ===
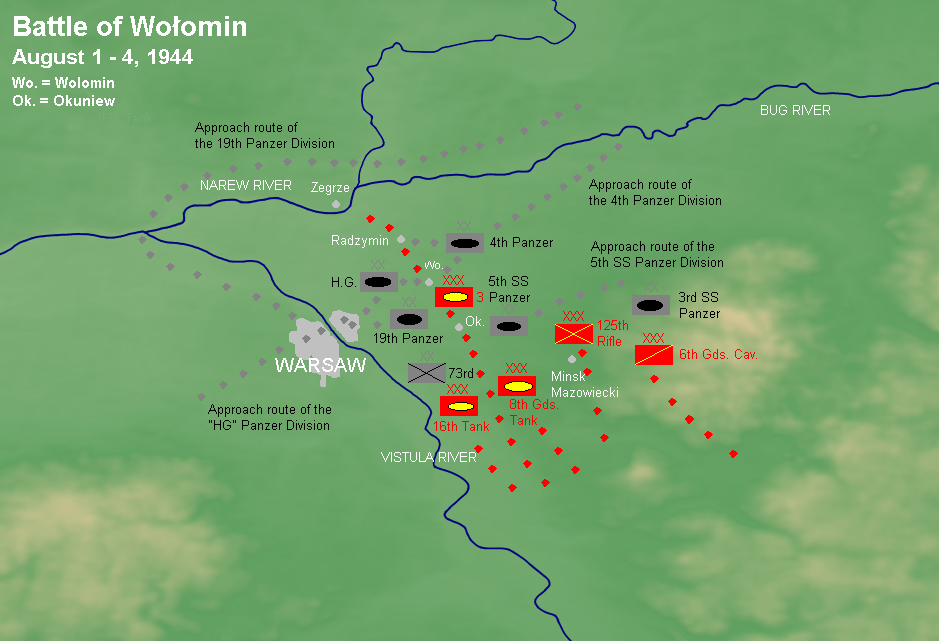
Battle of Radzymin

The Corps size Fallschirm-Panzerkorps Hermann Göring was created in 1944 through the combination of the unit with the Fallschirm-Panzergrenadier Division 2 Hermann Göring. After the start of the Allied offensive, Operation Diadem, on 12 May, the division retreated towards Rome and then abandoned the city. The division arrived in Poland in late-July and fought alongside SS Division Wiking, SS Division Totenkopf and the 19th Panzer Division on the Vistula River between Modlin Fortress and Warsaw. In August, its counter-attack against the Magnuszew bridgehead, defended by the 8th Guards Army, failed after heavy fighting. Between August and September 1944, the division used captured Polish non-combatant civilians as human shields when attacking the insurgents' positions during the Warsaw Uprising. Following the destruction of the city, the division was attached to the newly formed Army Group Vistula formed 24 January 1945, defending the ruins of Warsaw in what Hitler termed "Festung Warschau", or Fortress Warsaw. During the Vistula-Oder Offensive, much of the division was broken in battle.

In April, the remnants of the Hermann Göring Panzerkorps were sent to Silesia, and in heavy fighting were slowly pushed back into Saxony. On April 22, the Fallschirm-Panzer-Division 1. Hermann Göring was one of two divisions that broke through the inter-army boundary of the Polish 2nd Army (Polish People's Army or LWP) and the Soviet 52nd Army, in an action near Bautzen, destroying parts of their communications and logistics trains and severely damaging the Polish (LWP) 5th Infantry Division and 16th Tank Brigade (pl:16 Dnowsko-Łużycka Brygada Pancerna) before being stopped two days later.

In early May, units of the corps attempted to break out towards the American forces on the Elbe, but were unsuccessful. The corps surrendered to the Red Army on 8 May 1945.

== War crimes ==
According to a British Government report, the Hermann Göring Division was involved in several reprisal operations during its time in Italy. One of these occurred in the surrounding area of the village of Civitella in Val di Chiana on 29 June 1944 where 250 civilians were killed. The division was also involved in a number of other massacres in Italy at Cavriglia (173 victims), Monchio, Susano and Costrignano (130 victims) and Vallucciole (107 victims).

Soldiers of the Hermann Göring Division used civilians as human shields in front of its tanks while clearing barricades during the Warsaw Uprising. Around 800 soldiers from the division took part in fighting during the August–October 1944 Warsaw Uprising in the Wola district, where mass executions of civilians occurred in connection with Hitler's orders to destroy the city. Units of the division were also involved in the excesses committed in the Dutch city of Putten, also called the Putten raid. The units were:

- II./Fallschirm-Panzer-Regiment "Hermann Göring" (20 PzKpfw IV tanks)
- III./Fallschirm-Panzergrenadier-Regiment 2. "Hermann Göring"
- IV./Fallschirm-Panzer-Artillerie-Regiment "Hermann Göring"

== Organization ==
Structure of the division:

- Headquarters
- Hermann Goering Panzer Regiment
- 1st Hermann Goering Panzergrenadier Regiment
- 2nd Hermann Goering Panzergrenadier Regiment
- 1st Hermann Goering Artillery Regiment
- 1st Hermann Goering Anti-Aircraft Regiment
- 1st Hermann Goering Panzer Reconnaissance Battalion
- 1st Hermann Goering Tank Destroyer Battalion
- 1st Hermann Goering Panzer Engineer Battalion
- 1st Hermann Goering Panzer Signal Battalion
- 1st Hermann Goering Divisional Support Group

== Commanders ==
No.	Portrait	Commander	Took office	Left office	Time in office
1	Walther von Axthelm	Major; Walther von Axthelm (1893–1972)	13 August 1936	31 May 1940	3 years, 292 days
2	Paul Conrath	Oberst; Paul Conrath (1896–1979)	1 June 1940	14 April 1944	3 years, 318 days
3	Wilhelm Schmalz	Generalmajor; Wilhelm Schmalz (1901–1983)	16 April 1944	30 September 1944	167 days
4	Hanns-Horst von Necker	Generalmajor; Hanns-Horst von Necker (1903–1979)	1 October 1944	8 February 1945	130 days
5	Max Lemke	Generalmajor; Max Lemke (1895–1985)	9 February 1945	8 May 1945	88 days

Fallschirm-Panzer-Korps Hermann Göring

No.	Portrait	Commander	Took office	Left office	Time in office
1	Wilhelm Schmalz	Generalleutnant; Wilhelm Schmalz (1901–1983)	4 October 1944	8 May 1945	216 days

== Historical unit titles ==
Polizeiabteilung z. b. V. Wecke – February 1933 to June 1933
Landespolizeigruppe Wecke z. b. V. – June 1933 to January 1934
Landespolizeigruppe General Göring – January 1934 to September 1935
Regiment General Göring – September 1935 to the beginning of 1941
Regiment (mot.) Hermann Göring – Beginning of the year 1941 to July 1942
Brigade Hermann Göring – July to October 1942
Division Hermann Göring – October 1942 to June 1943
Panzer-Division Hermann Göring – June 1943 to April 1944
Fallschirm-Panzer-Division 1 Hermann Göring – April to October 1944
Fallschirm-Panzerkorps Hermann Göring – October 1944 to May 1945

== Notes ==
- Report of British War Crimes Section of Allied Force Headquarters on German Reprisals for Partisan Activities in Italy
- Polish government page
- Professor Peter K. Gessner State University of New York at Buffalo

== Citations ==
- Williamson, Gordon (2003). The Hermann Göring Division. Stephen Andrew. Oxford: Osprey Publishing. ISBN 1-84176-406-X. OCLC 59364241.
