= Fatherland Defense Force =

- Tėvynės apsaugos rinktinė
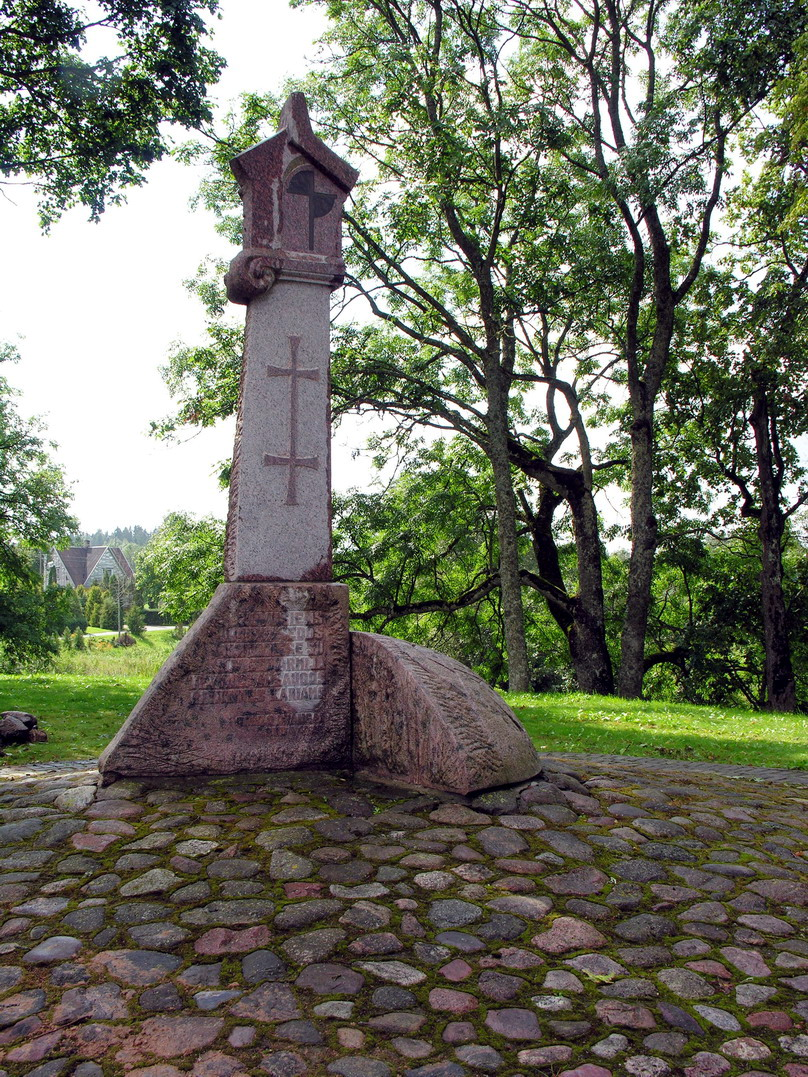
- Monument to fallen TAR members in Seda
- Active: July–October 1944
- Country: Lithuania
- Allegiance: Nazi Germany
- Branch: Wehrmacht
- Type: Infantry
- Role: Defend mainland Lithuania
- Size: 6,000 men
- Part of: 9th Army (Wehrmacht)
- Staff headquarters: Plinkšės, Mažeikiai District Municipality
- Nicknames: TAR, Mäder Regiment
- Engagements: Battle of Seda

Commanders
- German commander: Hellmuth Mäder
- Commander of TAR: Captain Izidorius Jatulis
- Commander of the 1st Regiment: Major Alfonsas Urbonas
- Commander of the 2nd Regiment: Lieutenant-Colonel Mečys Kareiva

The Fatherland Defense Force (Lithuanian: Tėvynės apsaugos rinktinė or TAR) was a short-lived military unit hastily formed in northwestern Lithuania towards the end of World War II to combat approaching Soviet forces. Formed from local Lithuanians, the unit was directly subordinate to the Wehrmacht. Their German commander was Hellmuth Mäder who was hoping to raise a division. However, only two ill-equipped and ill-trained regiments were actually formed. The total membership is estimated at 6,000 men. On October 7, TAR took defensive positions in Seda against the 19th Tank Corps of the 6th Guards Army. TAR suffered heavy losses and retreated towards Klaipėda (Memel). In East Prussia, the remaining men were reassigned to various pioneer units.

== Formation ==
As a result of the Operation Bagration, Soviet 1st Baltic Front reached eastern borders of Lithuania in summer 1944 and continued to push forward during the Baltic Offensive. In occupied territories, young men were forcibly mobilized into the Red Army. Lithuanians, having suffered the repressive Soviet occupation in 1940–41, began evacuating towards the west and forming armed groups in Samogitia. On 28 July 1944, Lithuanian officers met in the village of Pievėnai and discussed options for defending Lithuania: either join the Wehrmacht and fight openly or become partisans and wage a guerrilla war, a tactic chosen by the Lithuanian Liberty Army. The former option won by a narrow margin of votes and these improvised units were organized into TAR, commanded by Captain Izidorius Jatulis. The Lithuanians established contacts with Hellmuth Mäder, an officer in the 9th Army, via priest Jonas Steponavičius. Mäder agreed to support the new unit and provide it with weapons and uniforms.

The staff headquarters were soon moved from Pievėnai to a school of agriculture in Plinkšės.

== Organisation ==
The 1st Lithuanian Volunteer Regiment, commanded by Major Alfonsas Urbonas, was formed during August 1944. On August 26, it had two battalions and about 1,200 men, but only 47 officers. The 2nd Lithuanian Volunteer Regiment, commanded by Lieutenant-Colonel Mečys Kareiva, was formed during September 1944. There were plans for the 3rd Regiment that would have included the remaining Lithuanian Auxiliary Police Battalions and elevated TAR to the status of a division, but they were not realized. In total, TAR had about 6,000 men. Majority of the men were enthusiastic but inexperienced 18-to-20-year-olds, including 17-year-old Valdas Adamkus, future President of Lithuania.

TAR sorely lacked experienced officers: there were only 112 officers and even fewer had relevant combat experience. Five generals were present in the area and were asked to join TAR. One, Kazys Navakas, accepted but only as the head of the Provisions and Finance Department. Povilas Plechavičius, just released from his arrest due to his command of the Lithuanian Territorial Defense Force, accepted the invitation on a condition that Germans would grant him full authority over TAR. The Germans never replied and Plechavičius never joined TAR. Three other generals refused as they considered the effort to be futile and a waste of men's lives.

TAR also lacked weapons, radios, and other provisions.

The TAR was being joined voluntarily after undergoing a medical examination and by signing the Fatherland Defense Force's Pledge:

"I, by voluntarily joining the Fatherland Defense Force and being aware of the terms of enlistment, pledge to fight with all my might and without sparing my health or my life against the greatest enemy of our nation Bolshevism, to strive for the freedom of Lithuania, and to unconditionally carry out all orders and directives from my superiors."

Terms for joining the TAR, as approved by the Staff of TAR:

1. Units organized within the Fatherland Defense Force operate on the basis of military discipline.
2. All volunteers joining units of the Fatherland Defense Force are accepted for the entire duration of the war. The term of service may be extended only upon mutual agreement with the volunteers.
3. In the event of a reduction in the size of the Fatherland Defense Force or during demobilization, volunteers may be released even before the end of the war.
4. Volunteers who, for any reason, are unable to complete their pledged term of service may be released only with the consent of the Commander of the Fatherland Defense Force.
5. Upon joining a unit of the Fatherland Defense Force, every volunteer pledges in writing to defend LITHUANIA, to fight for its freedom, and to carry out and obey the orders of their commanders.
6. The Fatherland Defense Force provides each volunteer with subsistence and medical care. Furthermore, allowances are provided to the families of volunteers, specifically those dependent upon the volunteer, in accordance with established regulations.

== Activities ==
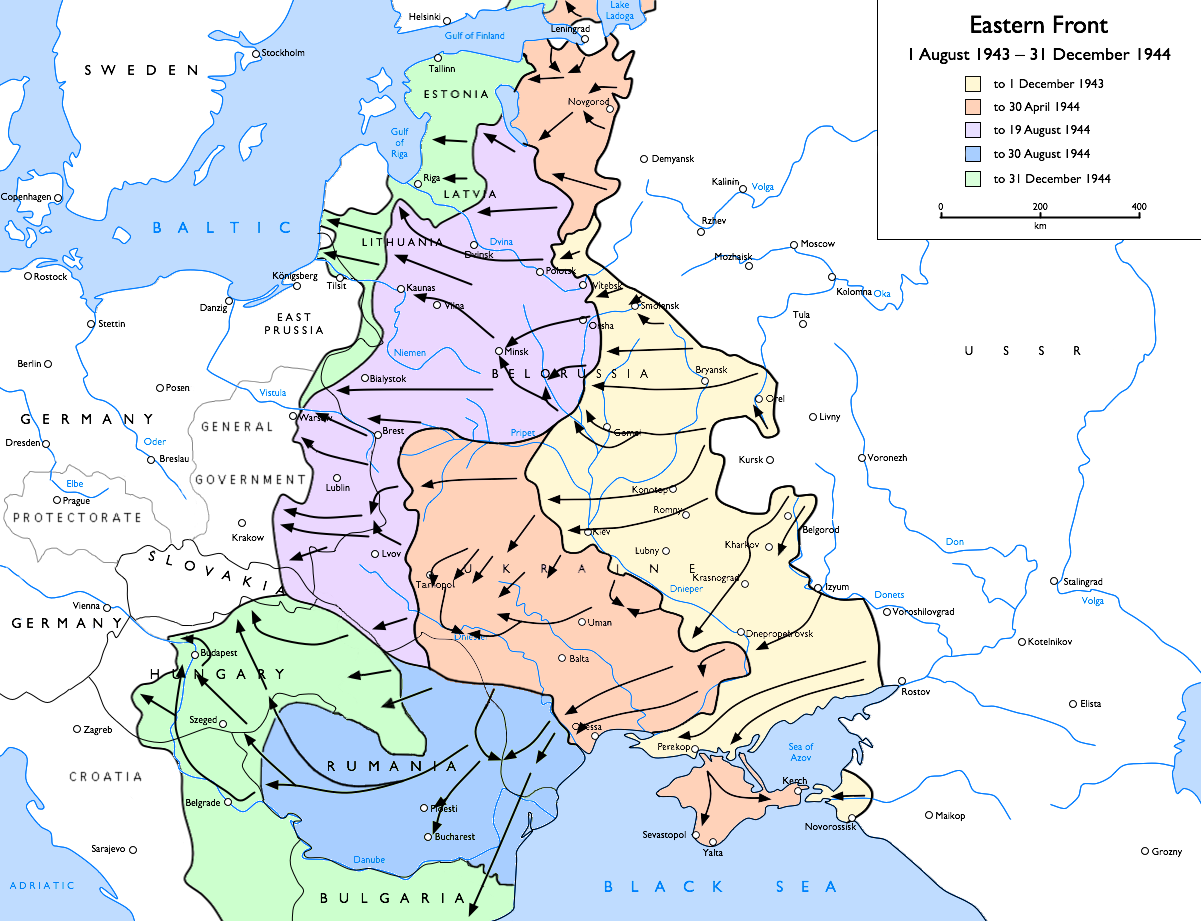
Soviet advances from 1 August 1943 to 31 December 1944: to 1 December 1943 to 30 April 1944 to 19 August 1944 to 31 December 1944

From the first days, the men were involved in strengthening and guarding the front line along the Venta River. The period of August–September was a relatively quiet period as part of the Soviet Army was attacking towards Riga while the other was regrouping and reorganizing in preparation for the offensive towards Klaipėda (Memel). From July 18 to September 19, TAR published five issues of its own newspaper Lietuvos Gynėjas (Defender of Lithuania). TAR also established a relief fund to provide aid to war refugees, firstly to family members of TAR soldiers.

On October 5, 1944, Soviet 1st Baltic Front began the Memel Offensive. The main strategic goal of the offensive was to separate German armies and create the Courland Pocket. The Lithuanians were tasked with defending the towns of Seda (1st Regiment) and Barstyčiai (2nd Regiment). Despite promises, Lithuanians were not reinforced by German troops. The 1st Regiment was commanded by Major Pranas Puodžiūnas, former commander of the 4th police battalion, and Lieutenant Liudas Norkus, who also had experience in the Eastern Front. However, the regiment took a poor defensive position: the trenches were dug about 200 metres (660 ft) in front of the Varduva so that retreating soldiers would have to cross the river which had only one bridge. Germans intended to sacrifice the unit so that main German forces could regroup.

On October 7, Seda was attacked by the 19th Tank Corps, commanded by General Ivan Dmitrievich Vasilyev, of the 6th Guards Army. Lithuanians, armed with Panzerfausts, managed to destroy eight Soviet tanks T-34 but quickly ran out of ammunition and were forced to retreat. The regiment lost about 100 men, most of them during the retreat, particularly across Varduva. About 30 were taken captive by the Soviets. Order 193, signed by Stalin on October 8, mentioned Seda as a point of strong resistance and ordered to award most distinguished Soviet fighters.

The remaining men retreated to Barstyčiai where TAR unsuccessfully attempted to regroup. Facing further attacks form the Soviets, TAR retreated towards Kretinga and Klaipėda. The men faced a difficult choice – retreat west with the Germans or return home and join underground resistance that would become the Lithuanian partisans. Perhaps as much as half of the men joined the partisans. About 1,000 men reached East Prussia where they were organized into eight pioneer companies and used them to construct military defenses near Gdańsk, Łomża, Lübeck.

== Evaluation ==
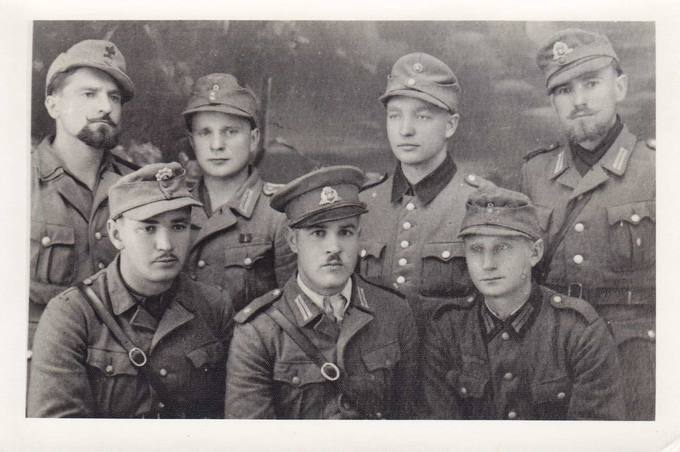
Group of soldiers of Fatherland's defense force

Overall, TAR is a rather obscure and poorly researched event in the history of Lithuania. One of the issues is lack of archival data. Archives of the 1st Regiment were saved by Captain Jonas Čėsna, who after the war immigrated to the United States. After the restoration of the independence, the archive was transferred to Vladas Kazlauskas, a former member of TAR who wrote several books on the topic. However, these writings are disorganized and self-contradictory. The archives still await attention from scholars. Archives of the 2nd Regiment did not survive; therefore, very little is known about its structure or activities.

The unit was organized by Lithuanian initiative when German forces were becoming more and more disorganized. Unlike the Lithuanian Territorial Defense Force, which shared the same goals, TAR was not controlled by the Germans. For example, the oath, which had to be signed by each TAR recruit, mentioned only defending the fatherland and combating Bolshevism making no mention of Nazi Germany. Lithuanian historians consider TAR as one of the attempts to reestablish the Lithuanian Army and fight for Lithuania's independence.
