= Karl Mauss =

German general (1898–1959)

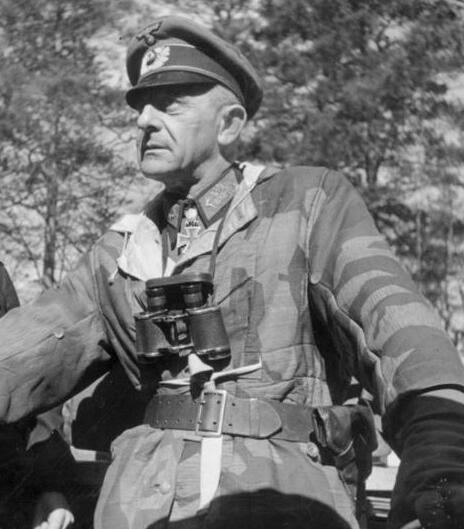
- Mauss in 1945
- Born: 17 May 1898; Plön, German Empire
- Died: 9 February 1959 (aged 60); Hamburg, West Germany
- Alma mater: University of Hamburg
- Military career
- Allegiance: German Empire; Weimar Republic; Nazi Germany
- Branch: Imperial German Army; Freikorps; German Army
- Service years: 1914–1922; 1934–1945
- Rank: Generalleutnant
- Unit: 10th Panzer Division
- Commands: 7th Panzer Division
- Conflicts: World War I; Battle of the Somme; Italian front; Silesian Uprisings; Battle of Annaberg; World War II; Invasion of Poland; Battle of France; Operation Barbarossa; Battle of Moscow; Battle of Kursk
- Awards: Knight's Cross of the Iron Cross with Oak Leaves, Swords and Diamonds
- Other work: Dentist

Karl Mauss (17 May 1898 – 9 February 1959) was a German military officer and dentist who fought in both world wars. As a general during World War II, he commanded the 7th Panzer Division and was one of only 27 German military men to receive the Knight's Cross of the Iron Cross with Oak Leaves, Swords and Diamonds. After the war, he returned to his dental practice until his death.

== World War I ==
Mauss was born in Plön in 1898 and volunteered for service in World War I in 1914 at the age of sixteen. He joined Lauenburger Jäger-Bataillon Nr. 9 of Ratzeburg, serving on the western front. In 1915, the youngest man in the division, he was awarded the Iron Cross, 2nd class, as the best scout in the region during the Battle of the Somme. The following year, shortly after the transfer of his division to the eastern front, he received the Iron Cross, 1st class. While serving with the 157th Infantry Regiment (4th Silesian), he was awarded the Hanseatic Cross of Lübeck by the Lübeck Senate on 22 March 1916. At the end of the war, he was a Leutnant with Infantry Regiment 162 (3rd Hanseatic).

== Interwar years ==
Following World War I, Mauss joined the paramilitary groups Freikorps Oberland and Marinebrigade Ehrhardt and fought against the Silesian Uprisings, including at the Battle of Annaberg. He left military service and, beginning in 1922, he studied dentistry at the University of Hamburg. He attained his doctorate in 1929, and opened a private dental practice. He re-enlisted in the army in October 1934 and served as a company and a battalion commander in Infantry Regiment 69. He reached the rank of Major in April 1938.

== World War II ==
At the start of World War II, Mauss served with the 20th Motorized Infantry Division, with which he participated in the September 1939 Invasion of Poland. In May 1940, his 10th Panzer Division took part in the Battle of France together with Heinz Guderian's XIX Army Corps. In the second phase of the campaign, Mauss participated in the battles against the French 7th Army.

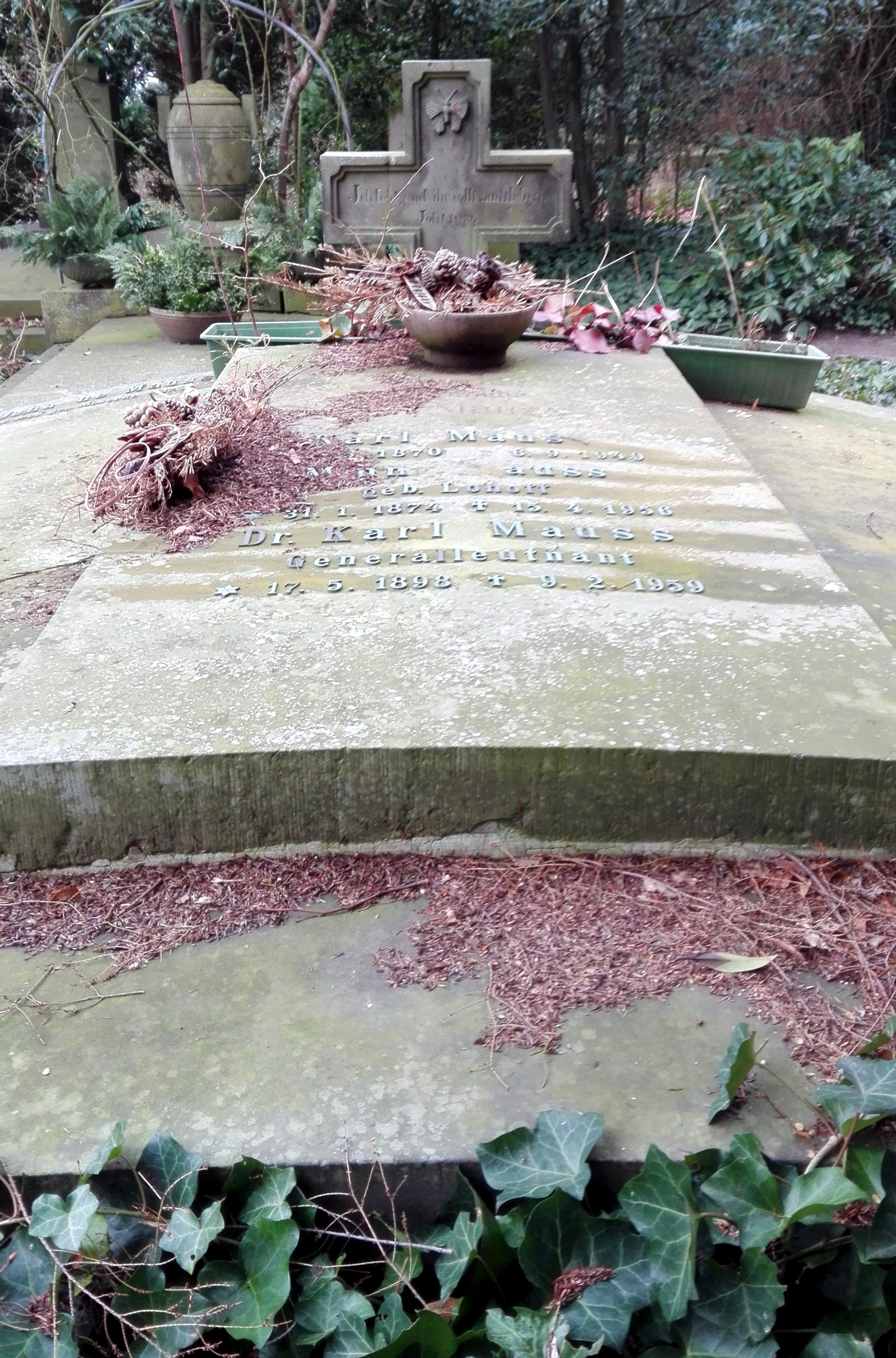
Mauss' Grave at the St. Lorenz Cemetery, Lübeck

In June 1941, Mauss took part in Operation Barbarossa, the invasion of the Soviet Union. In November 1941, he was awarded the Knight's Cross of the Iron Cross. From March 1942 to January 1944, he commanded Panzer Grenadier regiment 33. In April 1942, he was promoted to Oberst; he was awarded the Oak Leaves to the Knight's Cross in November 1943. In January 1944, he took command of the 7th Panzer Division. Mauss was promoted to Generalmajor on 1 April 1944, and to Generalleutnant on 1 October 1944. On 23 October 1944, he received the Knight's Cross with Oak Leaves and Swords. In February 1945, he was seriously injured and had a leg amputated. He received the Knight's Cross with Oak Leaves, Swords, and Diamonds on 15 April 1945. Reports that he was promoted to General der Panzertruppe in April are undocumented.

After the war, Mauss again worked as a dentist in his own practice. He died in 1959 following a lengthy illness.

== Awards and decorations ==
- Iron Cross (1914) 2nd Class (16 September 1915) and 1st Class (21 October 1916)
- Hanseatic Cross of Lübeck
- Wound Badge (1918) in black
- Clasp to the Iron Cross (1939) 2nd Class (28 September 1939) & 1st Class (25 May 1940)
- German Cross in Gold on 11 March 1943 as Oberst in the Panzergrenadier-Regiment 33
- Wound Badge (1939) in gold
- Knight's Cross of the Iron Cross with Oak Leaves, Swords and Diamonds
  - Knight's Cross on 26 November 1941 as Oberstleutnant and commander of the II./Schützen-Regiment 69
  - Oak Leaves on 24 November 1943 as Oberst and commander of the Panzergrenadier-Regiment 33
  - Swords on 23 October 1944 as Generalmajor and commander of the 7. Panzer-Division
  - Diamonds on 15 April 1945 as Generalleutnant and commander of the 7. Panzer-Division

Military offices
Preceded by Oberst Wolfgang Gläsemer	Commander of 7th Panzer Division; 30 January 1944 – 2 May 1944	Succeeded by Generalmajor Gerhard Schmidhuber
Preceded by Generalmajor Gerhard Schmidhuber	Commander of 7th Panzer Division; 9 September 1944 – 31 October 1944	Succeeded by Generalmajor Hellmuth Mäder
Preceded by Generalmajor Hellmuth Mäder	Commander of 7th Panzer Division; 30 November 1944 – 5 January 1945	Succeeded by Generalmajor Max Lemke
Preceded by Generalmajor Max Lemke	Commander of 7th Panzer Division; 23 January 1945 – 23 March 1945	Succeeded by Oberst Hans Christern
