= Hans Christern =

- Born: 24 January 1900
- Died: 17 June 1966 (aged 66)
- Military career
- Allegiance: German Empire; Weimar Republic; Nazi Germany
- Branch: German Army
- Service years: 1917–1920; 1936–1945
- Rank: Oberst
- Commands: 7th Panzer Division
- Conflicts: World War I; World War II; Battle of France; Operation Bagration; Battle of Radzymin (1944); Courland Pocket; East Pomeranian Offensive
- Awards: Knight's Cross of the Iron Cross

Hans Christern (24 January 1900 – 17 June 1966) was a highly decorated Oberst in the Wehrmacht during World War II. He was a recipient of the Knight's Cross of the Iron Cross of Nazi Germany. Christern took over command of the 7th Panzer Division in March 1945 which he surrendered to British troops in May 1945 north west of Berlin.

Following the war he worked as a farmer. He was involved in the CDU, and ran for office in the West German federal election of 1949, but failed to win his seat.

== Awards and decorations ==
- Knight's Cross of the Iron Cross on 31 January 1941 as Major and commander of the II./Panzer-Regiment 31

Military offices
Preceded by Generalmajor Dr. Karl Mauss	Commander of 7. Panzer-Division; 26 March 1945 – 8 May 1945	Succeeded by None
