= Hellmuth Mäder =

German general

- Born: 5 July 1908
- Died: 12 May 1984 (aged 75)
- Military career
- Allegiance: Nazi Germany; West Germany
- Branch: German Army
- Service years: 1936–1945; 1956–1968
- Rank: Generalmajor; Generalleutnant
- Commands: 7th Panzer Division
- Conflicts: World War II; Operation Barbarossa
- Awards: Knight's Cross of the Iron Cross with Oak Leaves and Swords
- Other work: Bundeswehr

Hellmuth Mäder (5 July 1908 – 12 May 1984) was a German general during World War II. He was a recipient of the Knight's Cross of the Iron Cross with Oak Leaves and Swords of Nazi Germany.

== Early life ==
Hellmuth Mäder was a native of Rotterode, Thuringia, which at the time of his birth was in the Province of Hesse-Nassau, German Empire.

On April 1, 1928, Mäder joined the German police as an officer candidate, attending the Bonn State Police Academy, the State Police School for Weapons and Physical Training in Spandau near Berlin, the Eiche Higher State Police School, and the School for Technology and Transport in Berlin-Tempelhof. On April 1, 1933, he was promoted to police lieutenant and exactly one year later to police oberleutnant.

On 1 October 1935, Mäder joined the Wehrmacht as a first lieutenant.

== World War II ==
=== 1939–1941 ===
Between August and December 1939, he served as a junior officer in the 34th Infantry Division, after which he completed a three-month general staff course at the Dresden War Academy.

In the spring of 1940, Oberleutnant Mäder commanded the 522nd Infantry Regiment's 14th Company in the newly-formed 297th Infantry Division, which was not deployed in the Battle of France. In late 1940, he was appointed commander of the 522nd Infantry Regiment's III Battalion and served in that post during the opening phase of Operation Barbarossa.

=== Eastern Front ===
His division fought under Army Group South, advancing on Kyiv and Rostov, and for his gallantry during the defensive action of winter 1941–1942, Mäder was awarded the Knight's Cross of the Iron Cross on April 3, 1942. In July 1942, he was promoted to Major and took command of 522nd Infantry Regiment, which distinguished itself during 6th Army's drive to the Don, fighting at Kharkiv, the Izyum Pocket, and Voronezh.

==== Battle of Stalingrad (1942–1943) ====
Promoted to Oberstleutnant, Mäder led his regiment into Stalingrad, where it was cut off with the rest of the 6th Army. Hellmuth Mäder led battle groups of his regiment and others during the defensive fighting of December 1942 and January 1943. A serious wound led to his evacuation by air before the final collapse of the 6th Army at Stalingrad. While recovering from his wounds Mäder was placed on the Führerreserve until early 1944.

==== Spring 1944 ====
Promoted to Oberst, he was given command of the Eingreifbrigade Narwa and returned to the northern sector of the Eastern Front. Here, he was successful in halting a number of localized Soviet attacks before being severely wounded once more. This time, on recovery from his wounds, he was appointed commander of the Heeresgruppen Waffenschule Nord, a weapons training establishment.

==== Summer 1944 ====
When the Soviets launched their 1944 summer offensives, he returned to the front, having responsibility as Kampfkommandant for organizing the defense of a vital railway junction at Šiauliai, between Königsberg and Riga, during the Šiauliai offensive. He held it open under heavy attack for two days, allowing retreating German units to pass safely through. For this achievement, he was awarded the Oak Leaves on August 27, 1944. Moreover, Mäder in the summer of 1944 agreed to provide weapons and uniforms for the Lithuanian military unit Fatherland Defense Force, which fought independently from the Wehrmacht with the Red Army by seeking to restore Lithuania's independence.

==== Autumn 1944 and Spring 1945 ====
In autumn 1944, Mäder served briefly as commander of the 7th Panzer Division, again on the northern Russian front. At the end of 1944, he was given command of the elite Führerbegleitbrigade, a part of Panzerkorps Großdeutschland. He led it through the Ardennes offensive, and when, in early 1945, the brigade was expanded to become the Führer-Grenadier-Division, the promoted Generalmajor Mäder was put in command. The new division saw fighting on the eastern front near Stettin before being forced to retreat southwest to the outskirts of Vienna. Here, during the final battles for the Austrian capital, Generalmajor Mäder was awarded the Swords to his Knight's Cross on April 18, 1945.

== Cold War ==
Although Mäder had surrendered to US forces, he was handed over to the Soviets, who held him in captivity until 1955.

In 1956, Mäder joined the Bundeswehr, serving with the rank of brigade general and commanding the Infanterieschule Hammelburg. His last rank before retirement was lieutenant general. In 1974, he was arrested, convicted, and sentenced to two years imprisonment for money he embezzled in his position in the Bundeswehr, as well as for inconsistencies in his expense reports. It was an accusation that he denied until he died on May 12, 1984, in Konstanz.

== Awards ==
- Iron Cross (1939) 2nd Class (27 June 1941) & 1st Class (1 August 1941)
- Knight's Cross of the Iron Cross with Oak Leaves and Swords
  - Knight's Cross on 3 April 1942 as Major and commander of the III./Infanterie-Regiment 522
  - 560th Oak Leaves on 27 August 1944 as Oberst and leader of the Lehr-Brigade Nord/Heeresgruppe Waffenschule Nord and at the same time combat commander of Šiauliai
  - 143rd Swords on 18 April 1945 as Generalmajor and commander of the Führer-Grenadier-Division

Military offices
| Preceded by General der Panzertruppe Dr. Karl Mauss | Commander of 7. Panzer-Division; 31 October 1944 – 30 November 1944 | Succeeded by General der Panzertruppe Dr. Karl Mauss |
| Preceded by Major von Courbière | Commander of Führer Grenadier Division; 26 January 1945 – 1 February 1945 | Succeeded by Generalmajor Erich von Haßenstein |
| Preceded by Generalmajor Helmuth Reinhardt | Chief of Truppenamt of the Bundeswehr; 1 October 1960 – 30 September 1968 | Succeeded by Generalleutnant Hubert Sonneck |
