= Sicherheitspolizei (Weimar Republic) =

German militarized police units

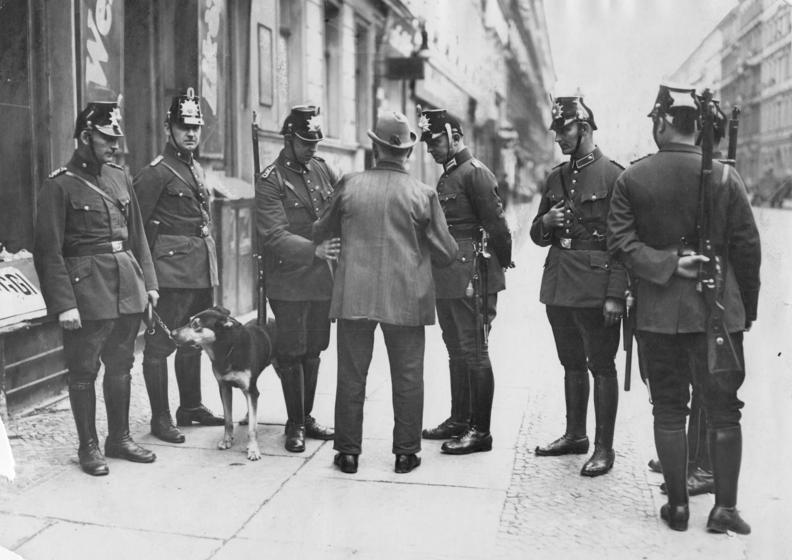
Policemen in Wedding search a man for weapons during a crackdown in 1931.

The Sicherheitspolizei, or security police, was a militarized German police group set up in most states of the Weimar Republic at the end of 1919 and largely financed by the central government. In its crowd control and riot control, force protection, law enforcement, and public security roles it can be seen as roughly analogous to the Bereitschaftspolizei in today's Federal Republic.

In view of the unstable internal political situation in the early Weimar Republic, especially in the Reich capital, Berlin, Hauptmann Waldemar Pabst of the Guards Cavalry Rifle Division considered a barracked and militarily armed and trained police group necessary to control political violence. The Prussian Interior Ministry envisaged a militarily armed and trained police group to control political violence a more useful tool in the fight against insurrection than the existing police forces inherited from the monarchical era. In the course of the German Revolution of 1918–19, extensive general strikes and street violence in March 1919 led Pabst to propose a corresponding concept to the Reichswehr Minister Gustav Noske. Noske approved the plan and promoted its formation together with Wolfgang Heine. According to Noske's wishes, the police group thus constituted the nucleus of the new Reichswehr, officially founded on 6 March 1919. In September 1919, 2,500 local and municipal police officers protested against the formation of the new national-police service. In contrast to local police, who usually wore blue uniforms, the SiPo were called the "green police" after the color of their uniforms.

== Conversion and reorganization ==
In response to protest from the French government in 1920, the national level security police units were either dissolved or sent to perform local policing. France feared a clandestine rearmament and saw the new paramilitary police force as a threat to its security. The planned airborne component of some security police had to be abandoned and their use of artillery and tanks were prohibited. France demanded the abolition of the green uniform, which they viewed as camouflage clothing. A blue uniform was introduced in most regions. Only Bavaria, Wurttemberg, Mecklenburg, and Bremen retained uniform components of a dark green color. The pants were mostly black or black-blue. Particularly striking was the Saxon version with a fairly light medium blue color. However, it took some years before the uniforming was completed, since the uniforms already purchased had to be used up before new ones could be requisitioned. Steel helmets were generally abolished and were not reissued until around 1930. The terms "SiPo" and "green police" continued in popular usage until the Nazi reorganization and disbandment of local police forces in 1935.

== Strength, training, and equipment ==
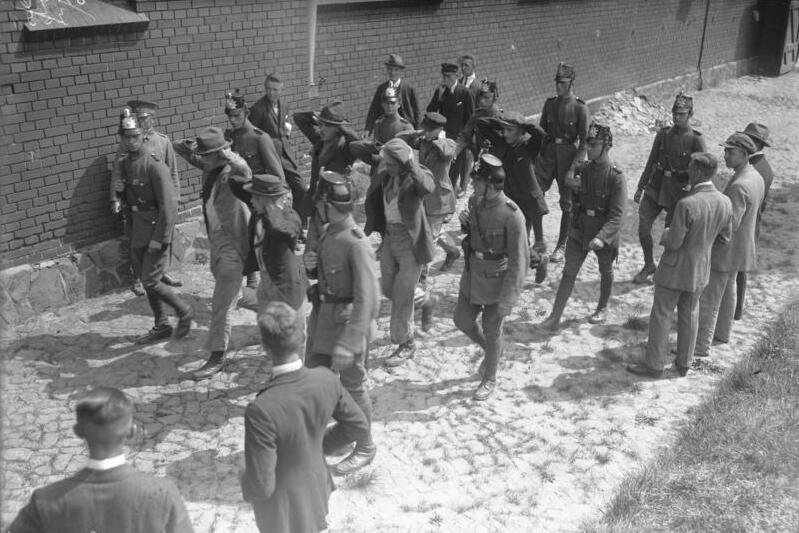
Police cadets at an academy in Brandenburg an der Havel practice marching insurgents.

The training of the security police was tailored to a paramilitary force. The standard service period, analogous to the Reichswehr, was 12 years. The transfer to the local police or gendarmerie was by no means guaranteed, although in general a takeover was planned for the administrative service. With the global economic crisis of 1929, this could no longer be realized, as all countries had to save on personnel costs.

Equipment and armament was entirely designed for combat against heavily armed insurgents. Depending on the size of the member state, the security police had a number of so-called special cars, mostly British Daimler DZVR 21s or German Ehrhardt 21s, which were usually equipped with two turrets with one machine gun each. Machine guns, carbines, and grenades were also issued. The entire training, equipment and armament aimed at a civil war-like use both in large cities and in the countryside.

The security police were deployed extensively, combating the KPD's organized strikes and riots, including the Ruhr Uprising in the aftermath of the Kapp-Putsch in April 1920, the Mitteldeutscher Aufstand ("March Action") in March and April 1921, and the Hamburger Aufstand in October 1923, which were initiated in part by the KPD. From 1929 up to the ascension of the Nazi Party to power, the police were almost continuously engaged in operations protecting or dispersing demonstrations and political events.

== Evolution after 1933 ==
The Nazi concept of the role of the police originally called for only a very small force. Like the Communists, the National Socialists saw a kind of praetorian guardianship of the mainstream democratic parties, especially the SPD in Prussia, which continuously constituted the government there from 1919 to 1932. Moreover, on 9 November 1923, the Beer Hall Putsch led by the Nazi Party was defeated in Munich by the intervention of the Bavarian state police . As early as 1933, the transformation of the remaining local police into the national state police had begun. From August 1934 until the end of 1935 these were dissolved and its members transferred to the Wehrmacht.

== Gallery ==
Sicherheitspolizei
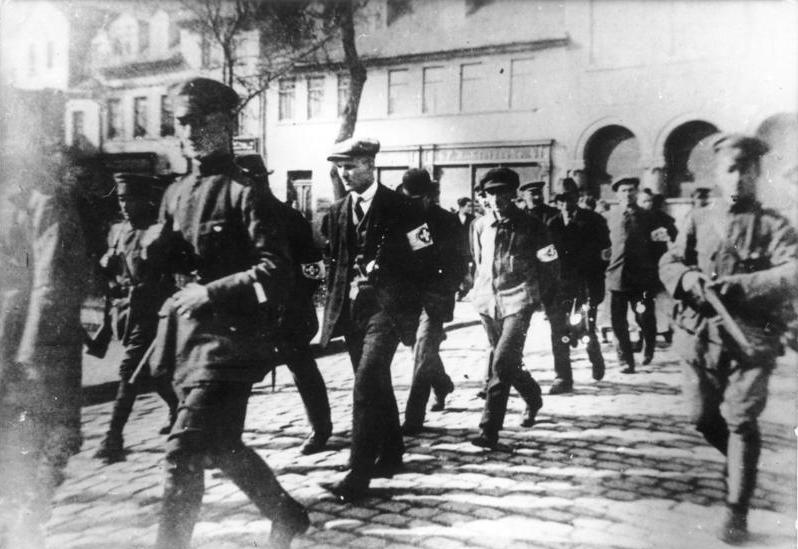
Riot police fighting strikers during the March Action of 1921, in Eisleben.

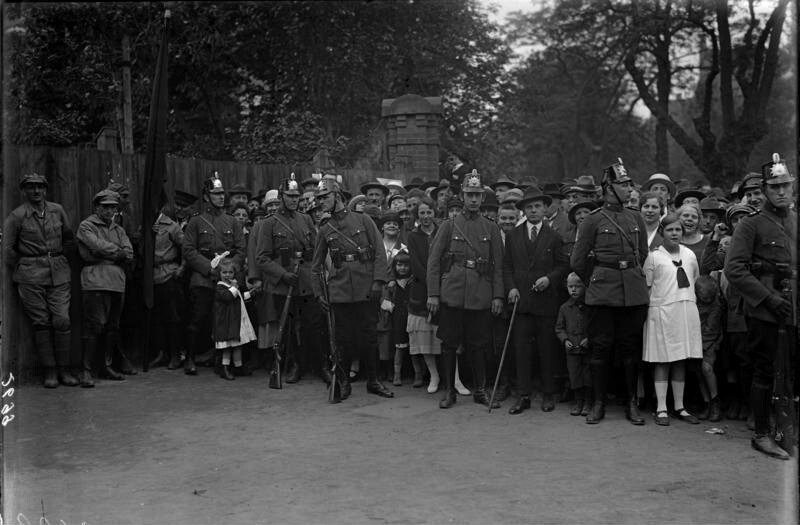
Regulating a KPD demonstration in Berlin, 1926.

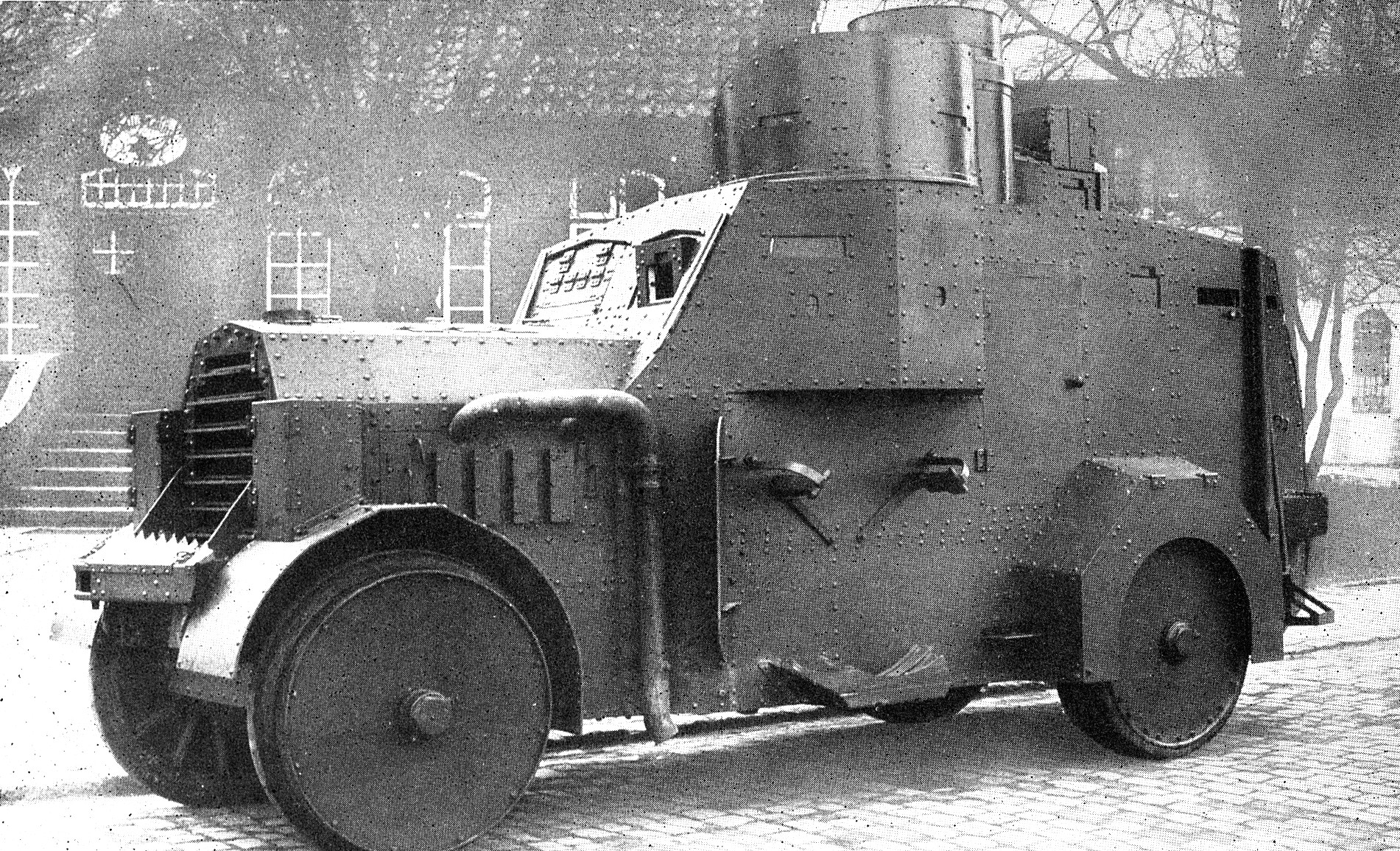
An Ehrhardt 21 armored car of the police forces.

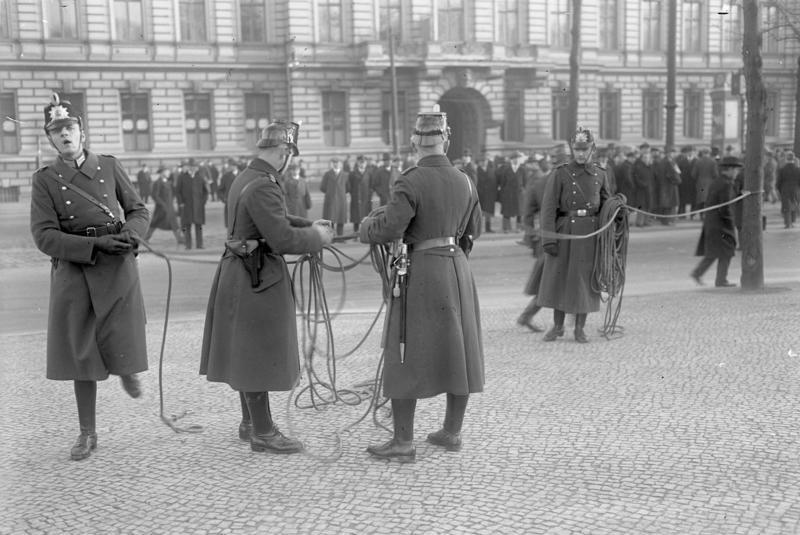
Providing a security cordon at the Reichstag building in 1930.

== Bibliography ==
- Leßmann-Faust, Peter (2012). Die preußische Schutzpolizei in der Weimarer Republik: Streifendienst und Straßenkampf [The Prussian police in the Weimar Republic: patrol service and street fighting] (in German). Frankfurt am Main, Germany: Publisher for Police Science. ISBN 978-3-86676-196-4.
- Knatz, Christian [in German] (2000). "Ein Heer im grünen Rock"? Der mitteldeutsche Aufstand 1921, die preußische Schutzpolizei und die Fraß der inneren Sicherheit in der Weimarer Republik ["An army in green coats"? The Central German uprising in 1921, the Prussian police and the deterioration of internal security in the Weimar Republic] (in German). Berlin, Germany: Duncker & Humblot. ISBN 3-428-09898-6.
- Danner, Lothar (1958). Ordnungspolizei Hamburg. Betrachtungen zu ihrer Geschichte 1919-1933 [Hamburg public order police. Reflections on its history 1919-1933]. Hamburg.
- Gietinger, Klaus [in German] (2009). Der Konterrevolutionär [The counter-revolutionary] (in German). Hamburg, Germany: Edition Nautilus. ISBN 978-3-89401-592-3.
- Hartenstein, Wilhelm (1926). Der Kampfeinsatz der Schutzpolizei bei inneren Unruhen [The combat deployment of the police during internal unrest] (in German). Charlottenburg: Offene Worte.
- Renn, Ludwig (1929). Nachkrieg [Postwar] (in German). Berlin, Germany: Wien.
- Lankenau, Heinrich: Denkschrift aus Anlaß des 10-jährigen Bestehens der Oldenburger Ordnungspolizei , Oldenburg 1929.
- Hellmuth Witt: Ergänzungen Lothar Danner: Ordnungspolizei Hamburg , Hamburg 1985.
- Zaika, Siegfried (1979). Polizeigeschichte. Die Exekutive im Lichte der historischen Konfliktforschung [Police story. The executive branch in the light of historical conflict research] (in German). Lübeck: Schmidt-Römhild. ISBN 978-3801620011.
- Schmidt, Daniel (2010). "Keine Kommissare. Preußische Polizeioffiziere zwischen soldatischem Selbstverständnis und polizeilicher Professionalität 1919 bis 1935" [No commissioners. Prussian police officers between soldierly self-image and police professionalism 1919 to 1935]. Militärgeschichtliche Zeitschrift (in German). 69. Munich, Germany: Oldenbourg Wissenschaftsverlag.
- Rettinghaus, Tessin [in German] (1974). Deutsche Verbände und Truppen 1918-1939. Altes Heer. Freiwilligenverbände. Reichswehr. Heer. Luftwaffe. Landespolizei [German units and troops 1918-1939. Old army. Voluntary associations. Reichswehr. Army. Air force. State Police] (in German). Osnabrück: Biblio-Verlag. ISBN 9783764810009.
- Neufeldt, Hans-Joachim [in German]; Huck, Jürgen [in German]; Tessin, Georg [in German] (1987). Zur Geschichte der Ordnungspolizei 1936-1945 [On the history of the public order police 1936-1945] (in German). Berlin: Bundesarchiv. ISSN 0435-706X.
- Boldt, Erwin B. [in German] (2002). Die verschenkte Reform. Der Neuaufbau der Hamburger Polizei zwischen Weimarer Tradition und den Vorgaben der brittchen Besatzungsmacht 1945-1955 [The wasted reform. The reconstruction of the Hamburg police between Weimar tradition and the requirements of the British occupying power 1945-1955] (in German). Munster, Germany: Southword Editions. ISBN 3-8258-5945-2.
