= Renavas =

Coordinates: 56°15′N 22°04′E

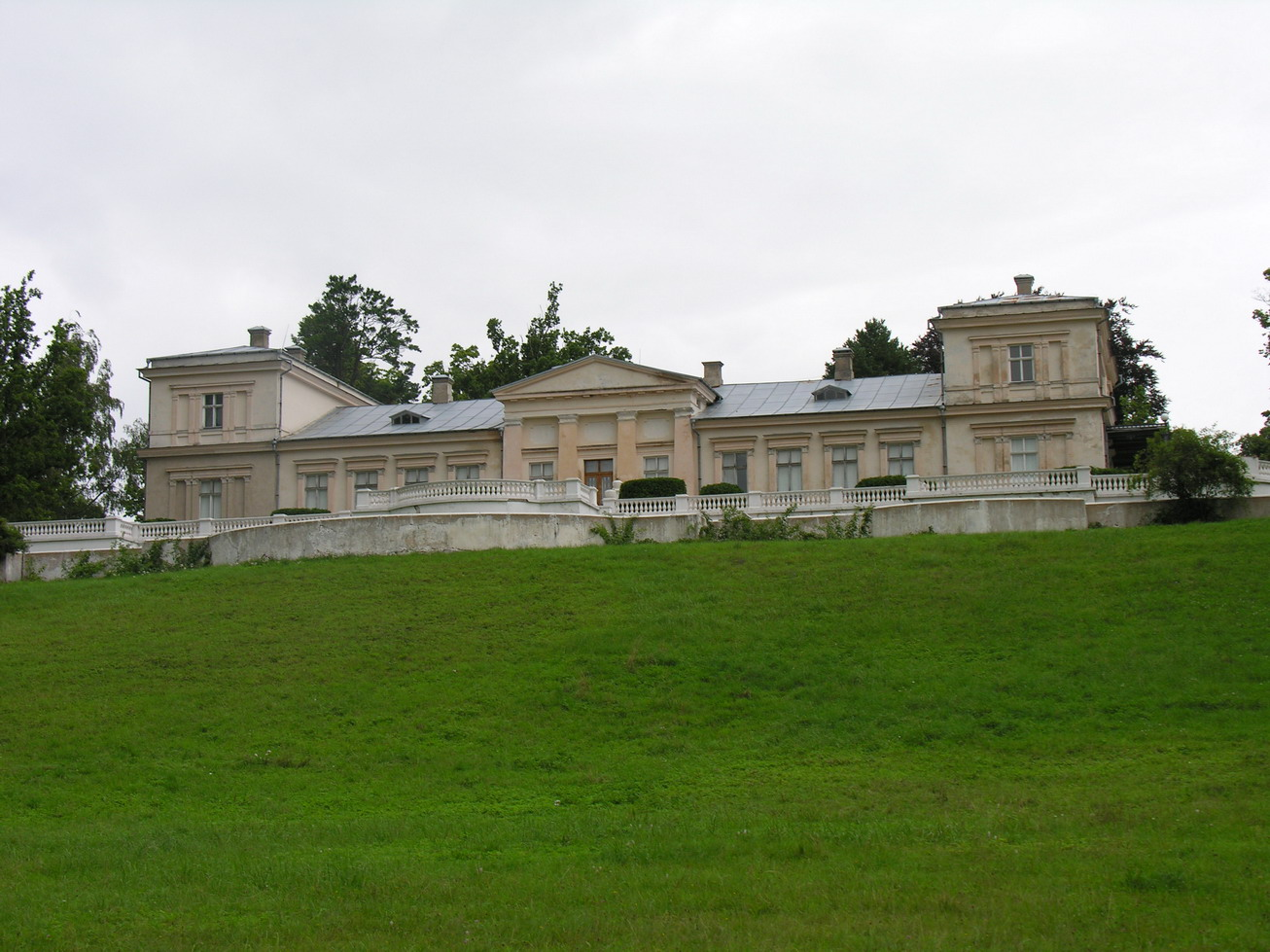
- Renavas Manor
- Interactive map of Renavas
- Country: Lithuania
- Ethnographic region: Samogitia
- County: Telšiai County
- Municipality: Mažeikiai district municipality
- Elderate: Seda elderate
- First mentioned: 16th century

Population (2011)
  - Total: 82
- Time zone: UTC+2 (EET)
  - Summer (DST): UTC+3 (EEST)

Renavas (Samogitian: Rėnavs, Polish: Renowo) is a village in Mažeikiai District Municipality, Lithuania. It is located on the left bank of Varduva river, nearby the road Židikai-Seda. The village is known for its 16th century manor.

== History ==
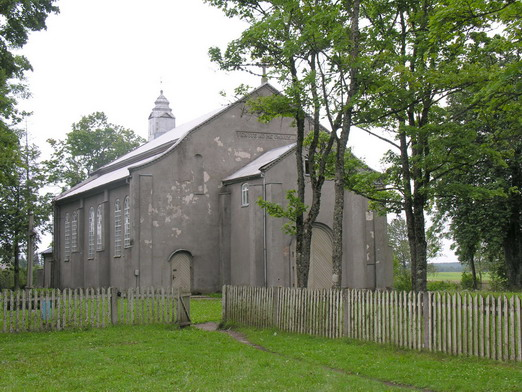
St. Isidore Church in Renavas

The manor was first mentioned in the 16th century. The current manor was built around 1880. In 1933 St. Isidore Church was built.

The village operates a high school, library and hydroelectric plant. The manor is now an affiliate of Mažeikiai museum.
