= Renavas Manor =

Coordinates: 56°13′40″N 22°3′25″E

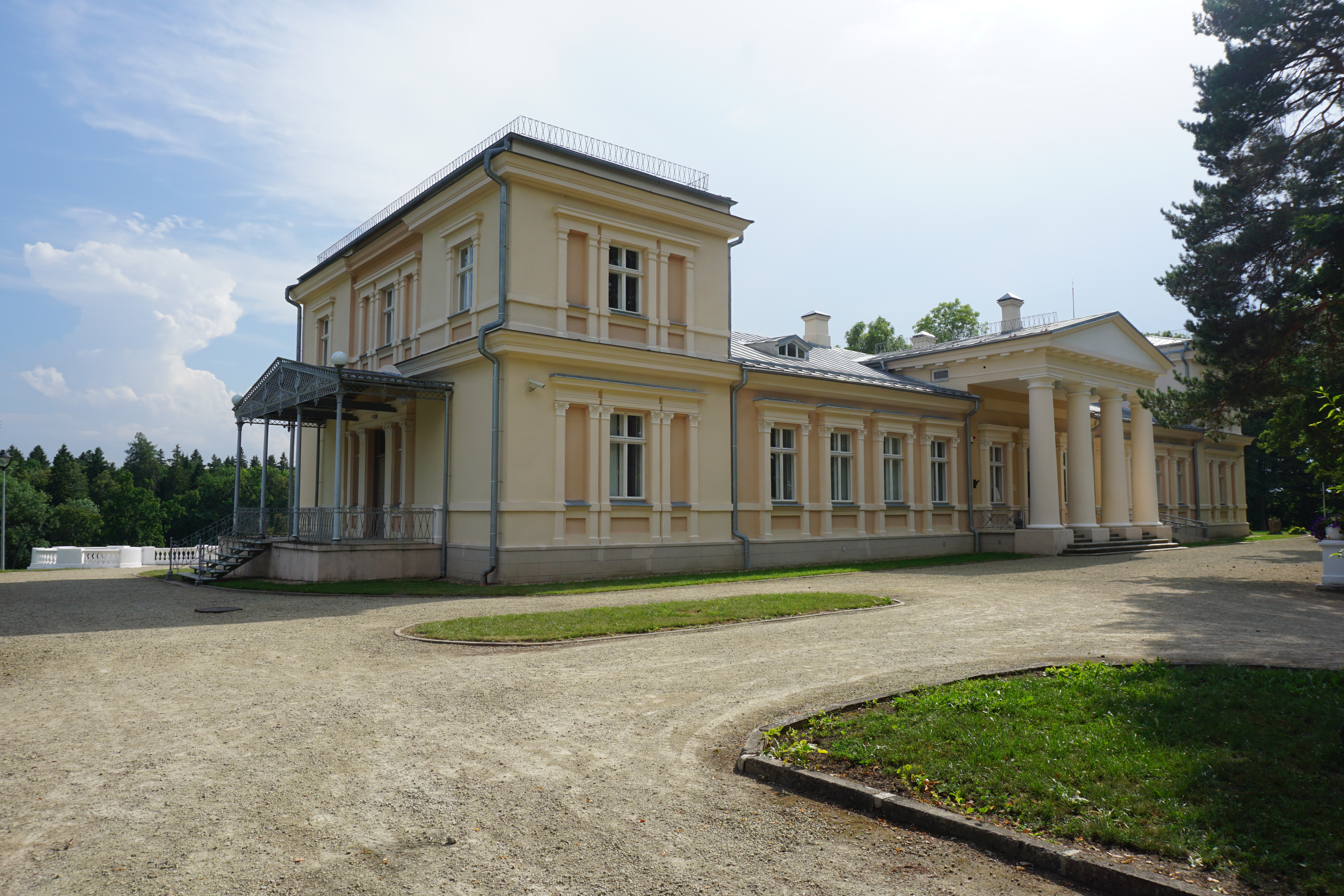
- Interactive map of the Renavas Manor area

General information
- Architectural style: Historicism
- Location: Renavas, Lithuania
- Construction started: 1830
- Completed: 1833
- Client: Rönne

Renavas Manor is a former residential manor in Renavas village, Lithuania on the bank of Varduva river. Currently it is a museum. In the manor's park grows the thickest Norway spruce in Lithuania. The manor is valued for its original interior. Renavas Manor is one of the main tourist attractions in Mažeikiai District Municipality.

== History ==
The estate was first mentioned on 26 December 1589 as Gaurai Manor in the inventory of Luoba's and Gaureliai's manors. It was stated in the inventory that the estate was leased to the Burba brothers. The mansion building at the time was wooden with a thatched roof.

=== The von Rönne Family ===
At the end of the 17th century the estate was purchased by French-born German family Rönne (Renė) from Bremen.

The family was known in Lithuania since the beginning of the 15th century, having been granted permission to reside in Lithuania from the Archbishop of Riga. They owned numerous manor houses including: Gargsdai, Hlinowka, Obakie, Zawierz, Wensau, Puhren, Oxeln, Bershof, Hasenpoth, Wilkajen, New Sahten and Old Appusen.

==== Stefan Karl von Rönne (c1678-1753) ====
Stefan Karl von Rönne (c1678-1753) was the first owner of Renavas from the von Rönne family. He bought Renavas and, together with his son, Mikolaj (b.c1720), built a wooden chapel on the estate.

In 1758, Stefan von Rönne's daughter, Johanna von Rönne, married Franciszek Piłsudski (1707-1791), Podczaszy (Deputy Cup Bearer) and member of Parliament.

==== Mikolaj von Rönne ====
Stefan's son, Mikolaj von Rönne, inherited the estate and became a Colonel in the Imperial Russian Army.

In 1753 the manor became the main residence of the family and in 1780 the estate was renamed Renavas.

==== Felix I von Rönne (1770-1827) ====
Renavas was then inherited by Mikolaj's son, Felix I von Rönne (1770-1827), who was Chamberlain of the Polish Court in 1792 and in 1799 received the medal of St. Stanislaus. He was awarded with the title Baron.

==== Antoni von Rönne (c1795-1869) ====
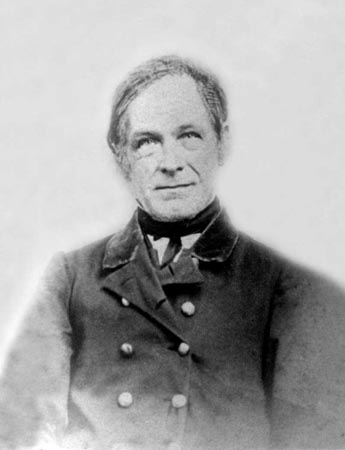
Laurynas Ivinskis

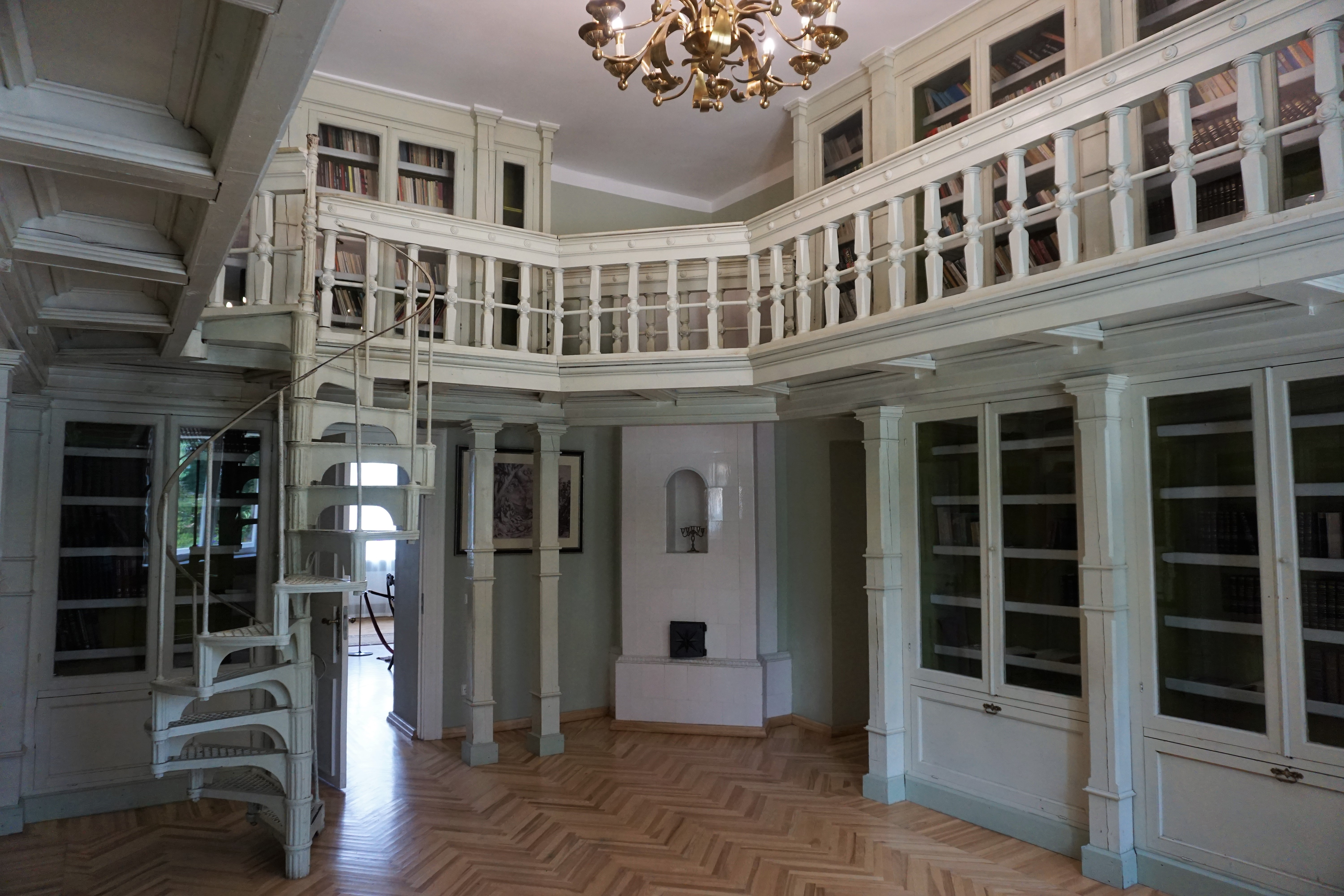
Renavas Library

Felix's son, now Baron Antoni von Rönne (c1795-1869) inherited the estate from his father.

Antoni received his master's degree in philosophy from Vilnius University, and also studied at Tartu University. Antoni Rönne was Marshall of the Nobility of Telšiai, in contact with the representatives of the whole of Europe's elite culture, belonged to the Masons, was highly regarded in science and helped Vladimir Gadon (1775-1842) in his research in 1794.

Between 1812 and 1819 Renavas was administered by the agronomist Mykolas Očepovskis - one of the pioneers in agricultural sciences in Lithuania and Poland.

On the initiative of Antoni Rönne in 1830-1833 the present-day Renavas Manor ensemble was built on a high slope at a picturesque site near the bend in the Varduva River. Ponds were excavated in the park, and stone steps and benches were made.

Antoni Rönne is remembered for his philanthropy, which included being the patron of schools and sponsoring the widow Viktoria Narutavičienė and her two sons - Stanislovas and Gabrielius. Antoni Rönne hired the teacher, publisher, translator and lexicographer, Laurynas Ivinskis (1810-1881) to teach the children. They would go on to become significant historical figures for both Poland and Lithuania: Gabriel Narutowicz (1865-1922) was elected the first Polish President, while Stanisław Narutowicz (1862-1932) became the signatory of the Act of Independence of Lithuania.

Renavas Manor is associated with the January Uprising of 1863. Here a rebel party was gathered and led by Liudžinskis, the steward of the manor.

The estate was famous for its garden and about 18 hectares of English-style park.

==== Felix von Rönne (1800-1844) ====
After the death of Antoni von Rönne (who had no male heirs), the estate was inherited by Antoni's brother, Felix von Rönne (1800-1844).

Felix renovated the interior of the mansion. Surviving from this period are impressive library furnishings (ceiling-high wooden cupboards and a curved cast-iron stairs leading to a gallery encircling the upper part of the room), white-tile ovens in the hall of mirrors, and a fireplace in the vestibule.

==== Eugene von Rönne (1830-1895) ====
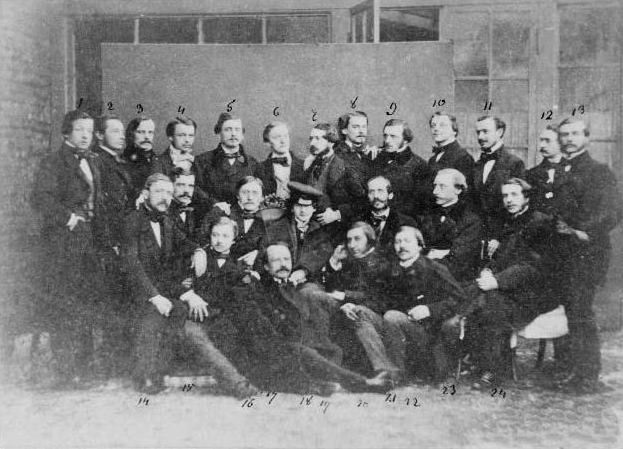
Polish landowners (participants of the Warsaw carnival of 1857). Eugene von Rönne is marked number 23.

Renavas then went to Felix's son Eugene von Rönne (1830-1895).

Eugene Rönne (1830-1895) loved to travel, and wrote poems in Polish. In 1878, he published a book "Poezye i prace dramatyczne" in Vilnius.

By this time, the library at Renavas was one of the most largest and most valuable in Lithuania. Topics included philosophy, natural sciences and history along with many books of fiction - this may have been influenced by the Baron's own love of writing poems.

In1880 Eugene married Gabriela Maria Ogińska (1830-1912) - granddaughter of Michał Kleofas Ogiński (1765-1833), former owner of Rietavas.

The manor also held an active cultural life. Gabriela Maria Ogińska's cousin's (Michał Mikołaj Ogiński) orchestras performed more than once, and the manor hosted prominent people including painters, writers and politicians.

In 1877, Eugene renovated the palace. The metal porch (inscribed with the initials of his father) was probably presented by Eugene in 1880, on the occasion of the centenary of the naming of the estate Renavas (1780). In 1890 the masonry buildings mentioned in the Renavas Estate inventory included: the palace, barn, stables, orangery and water mill. Wooden buildings included: an administrative building, servants’ house, laundry building and others.

=== The Mielżński Family ===
After the death of Eugene von Rönne, Renavas was inherited by Eugene's sister's (Aniela Helena von Rönne, married to Count Stanislaw Mielżński) son, Count Felix Mielżński (1871-1910) in 1895.

==== Count Felix Mielżński (1871-1910) ====
Felix Mielżński significantly altered the interior of the manor house, giving it elements of late Historicism (Neoclassical, Empirical, Neo-Rococo) and individual examples of Modern style.

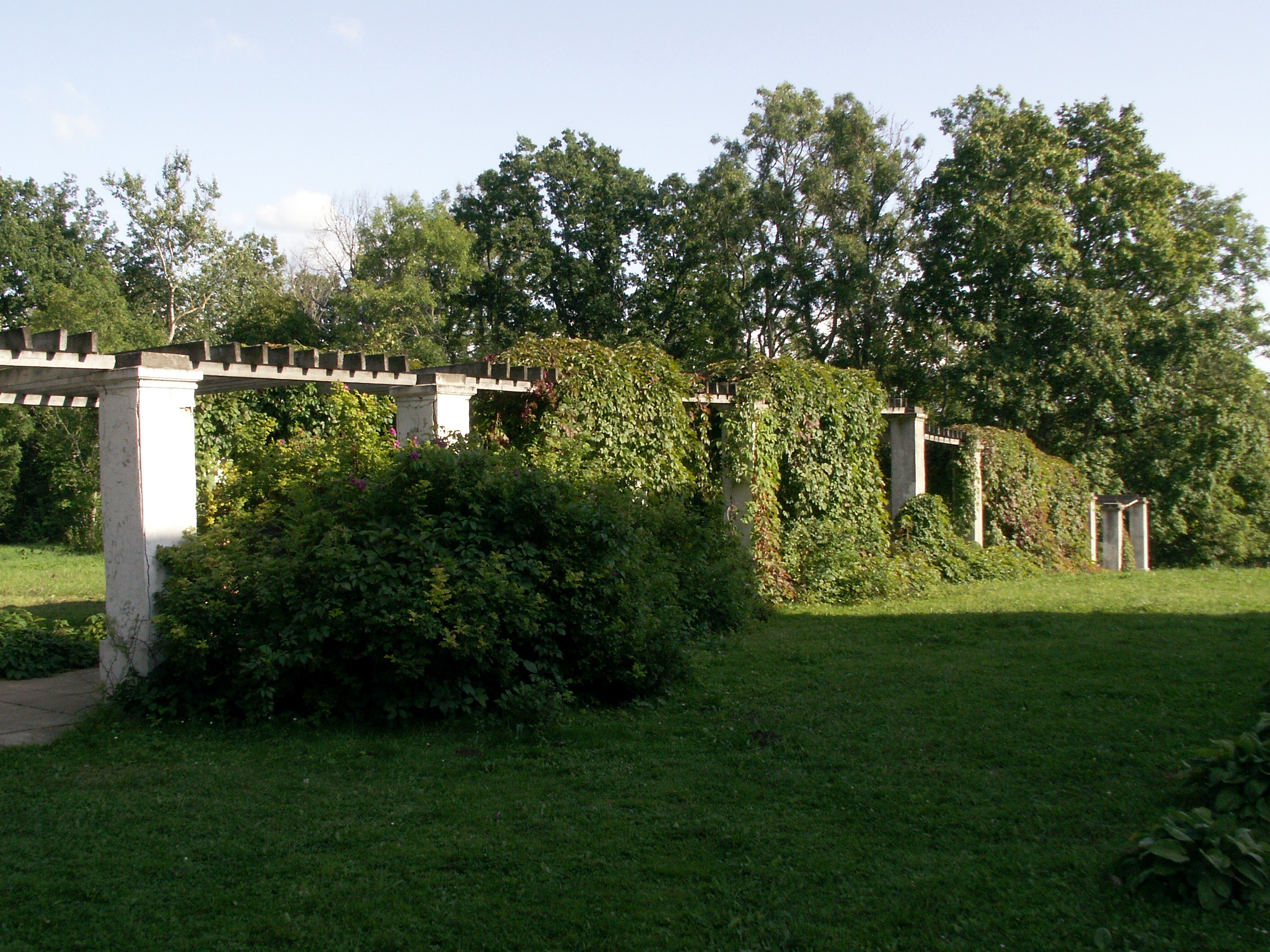
Renavas Pergola

He also constructed decorative terraces leading to the river and a pergola by the east façade. The farm sector was expanded on the north and west side of the estate, new buildings were constructed, and the lower park beyond the Verduva River was restored.

The Mielżńskis were particularly proud of their collection of porcelain ware and artworks made in European cities, as well as their library. It contained over 1,000 volumes of books (most of them nicely bound, in German and in Latin).

In the late 19th century, Renavas won fame by its garden and hothouses, in which silk worms were bred.

==== Stanisława Mielżńska (c1869-1958), and Maria Janušova Zdiechovska ====
Felix Mielżński's widow, Stanisława (c1869-1958), and her daughter Maria Janušova Zdiechovska were the last owners of Renavas Manor.

In the 1940s, the estate was nationalized by the Soviet government, and its archive was taken to Telšiai, where in the first days of World War II it burned.

Renavas had been in the von Rönne/Mielżński family for 250 years.

=== The Soviet Period ===
After the Second World War the manor housed the administration of a kolkhoz, library and cultural house.

=== Renovations ===
Since the 1970s, the Institute for the Restoration of Monuments has carried out historic, architectural and other research at the renovated palace buildings and the park.

For the first time in 1985 the manor was renovated.

== Gallery ==
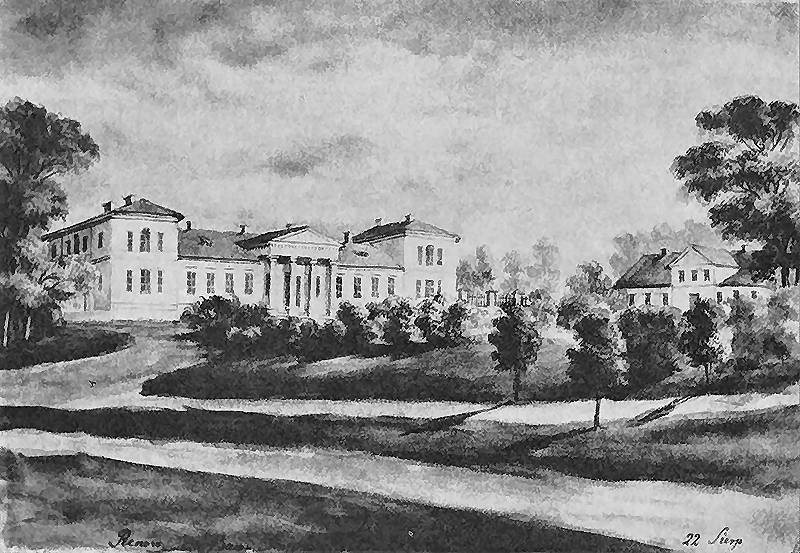
Renavas Manor in the 19th century

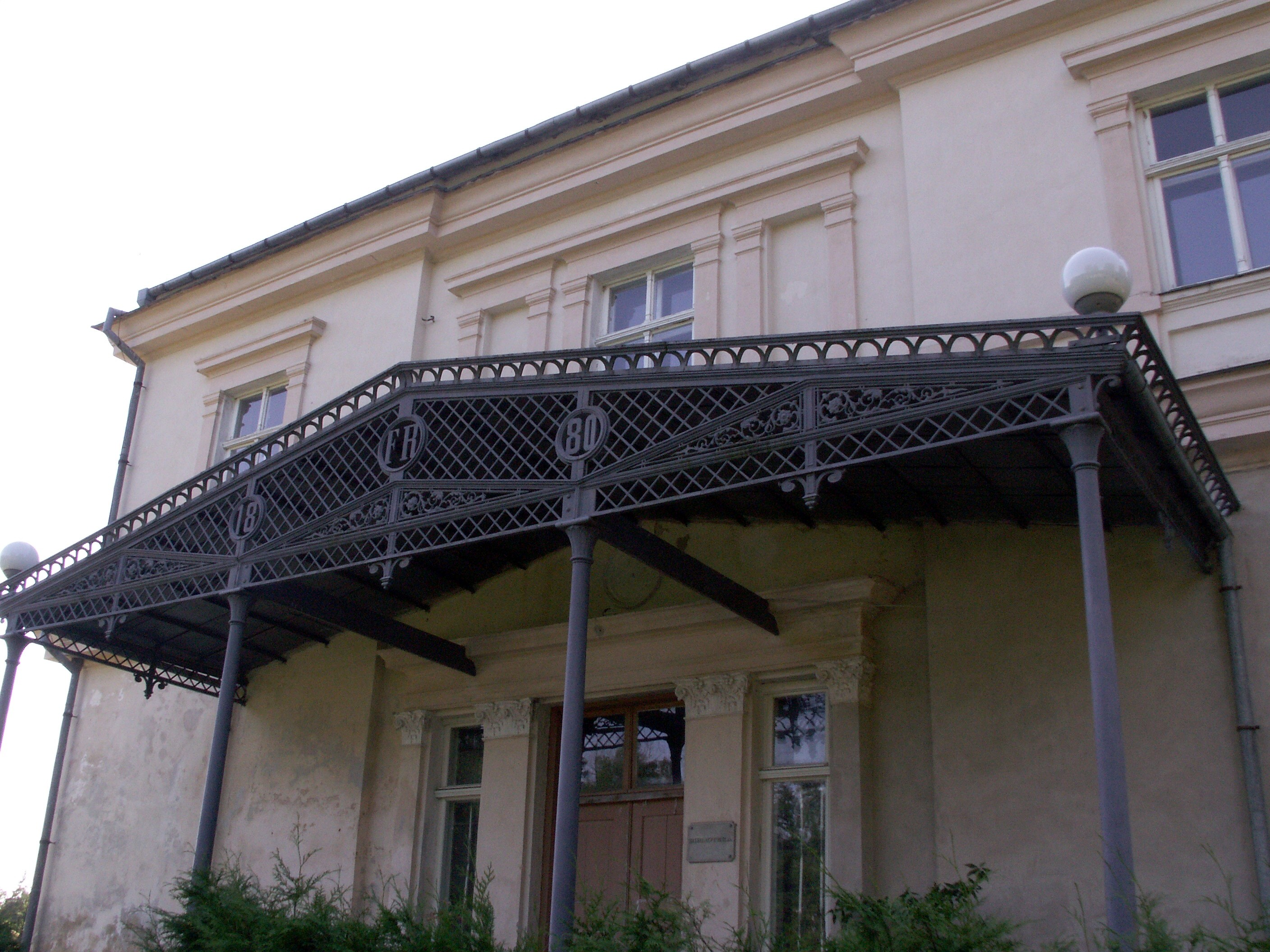
Cast iron pavilion

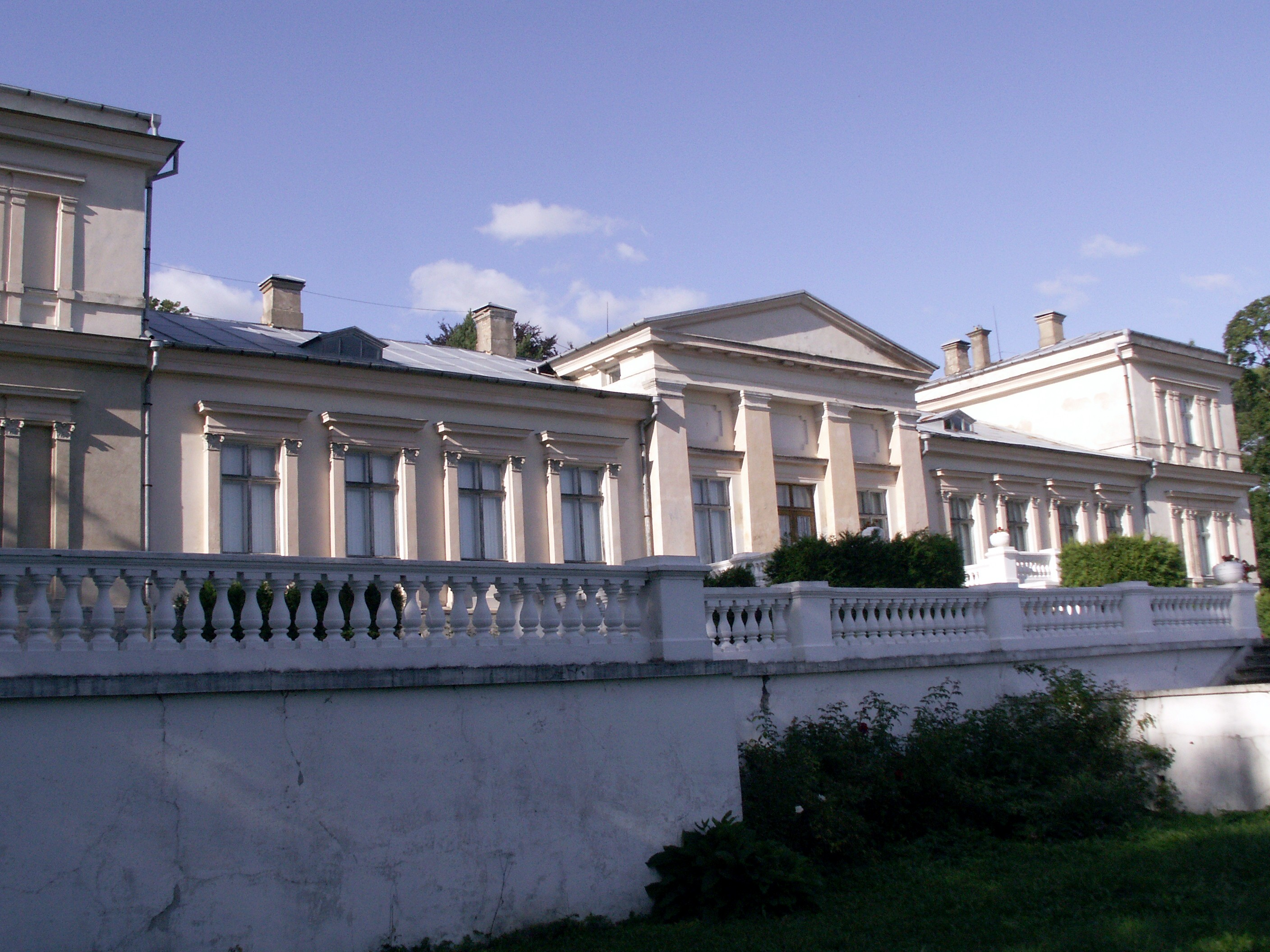
Baluster

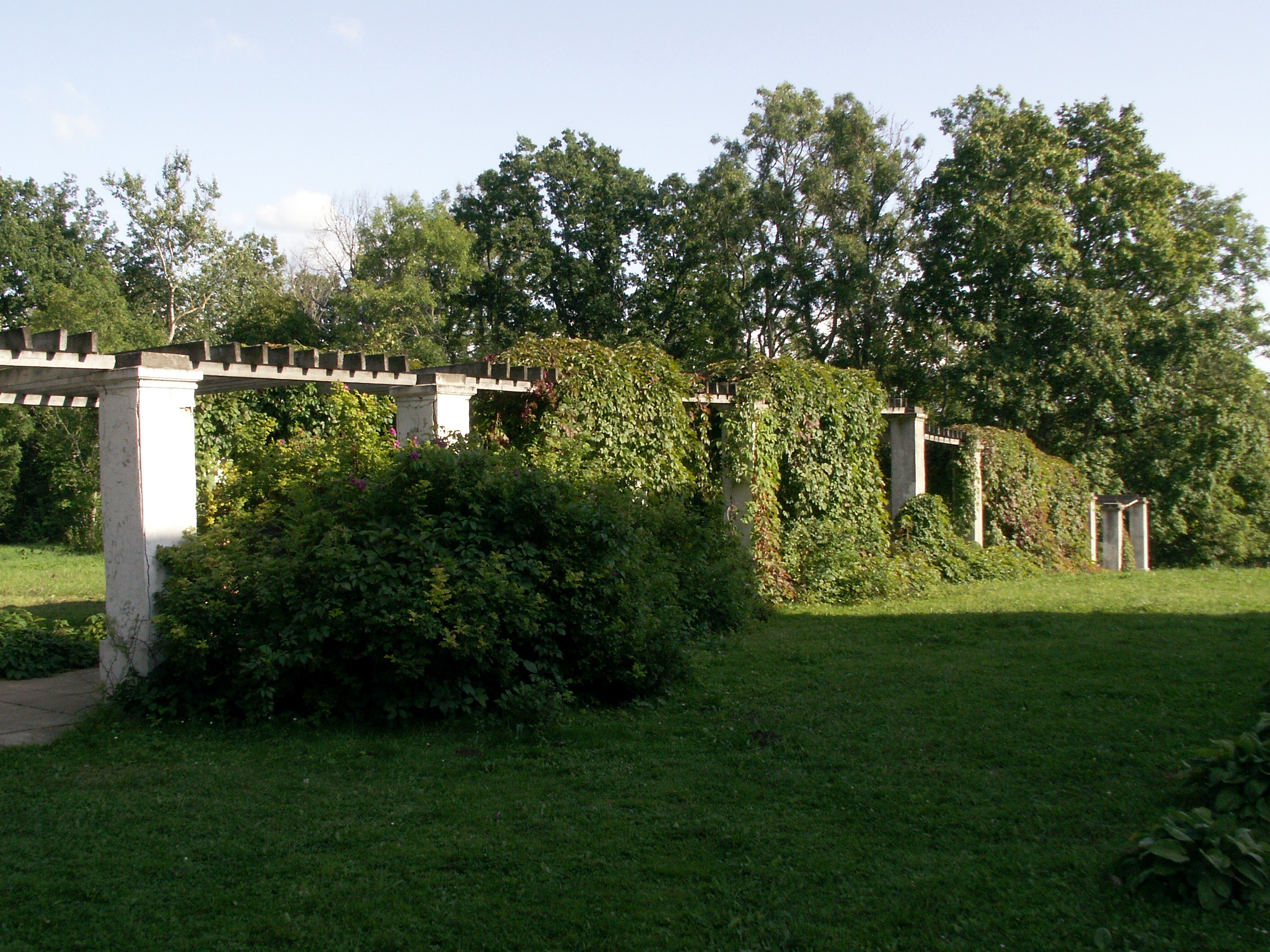
Pergola

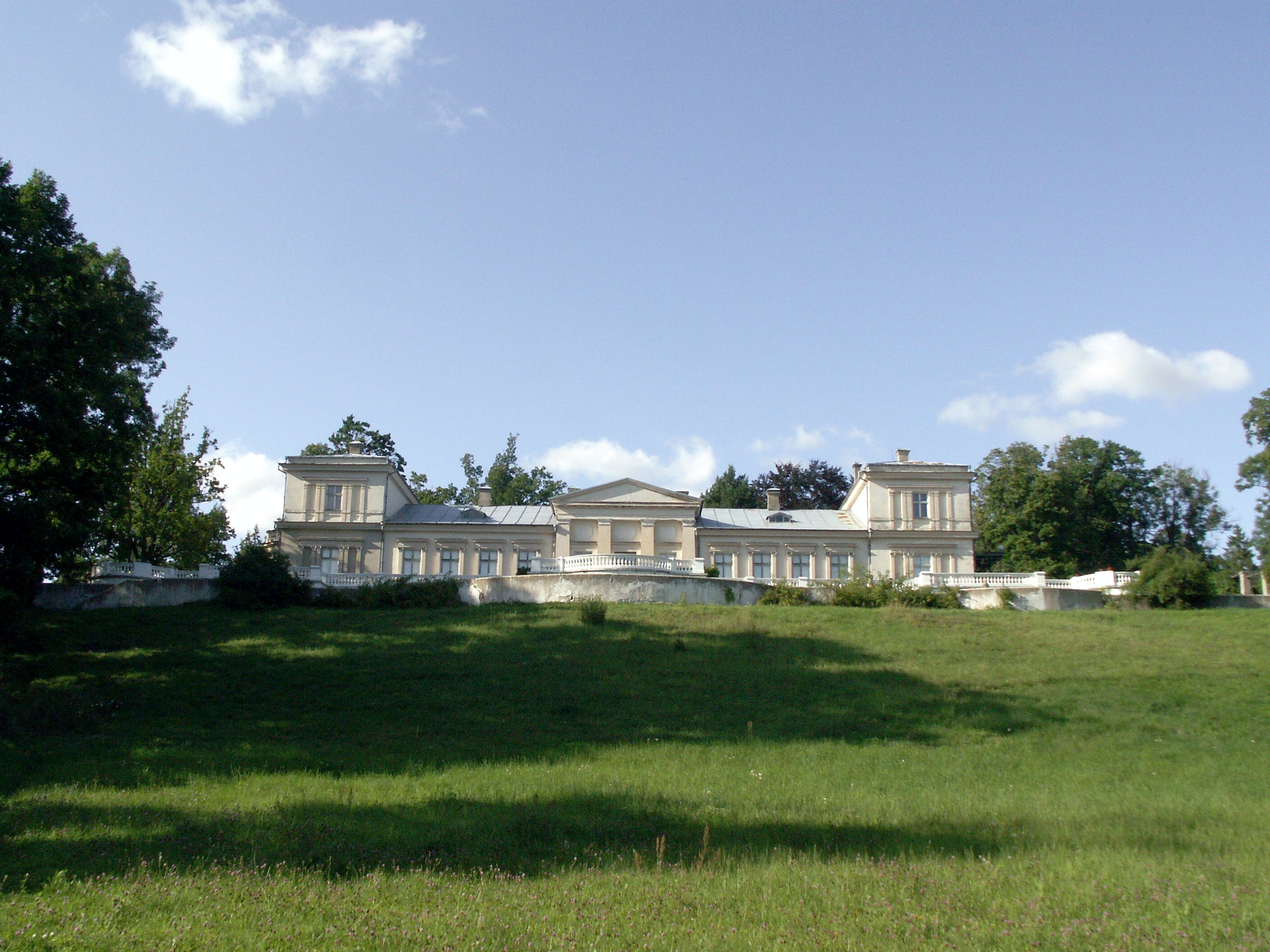
Manor from the park

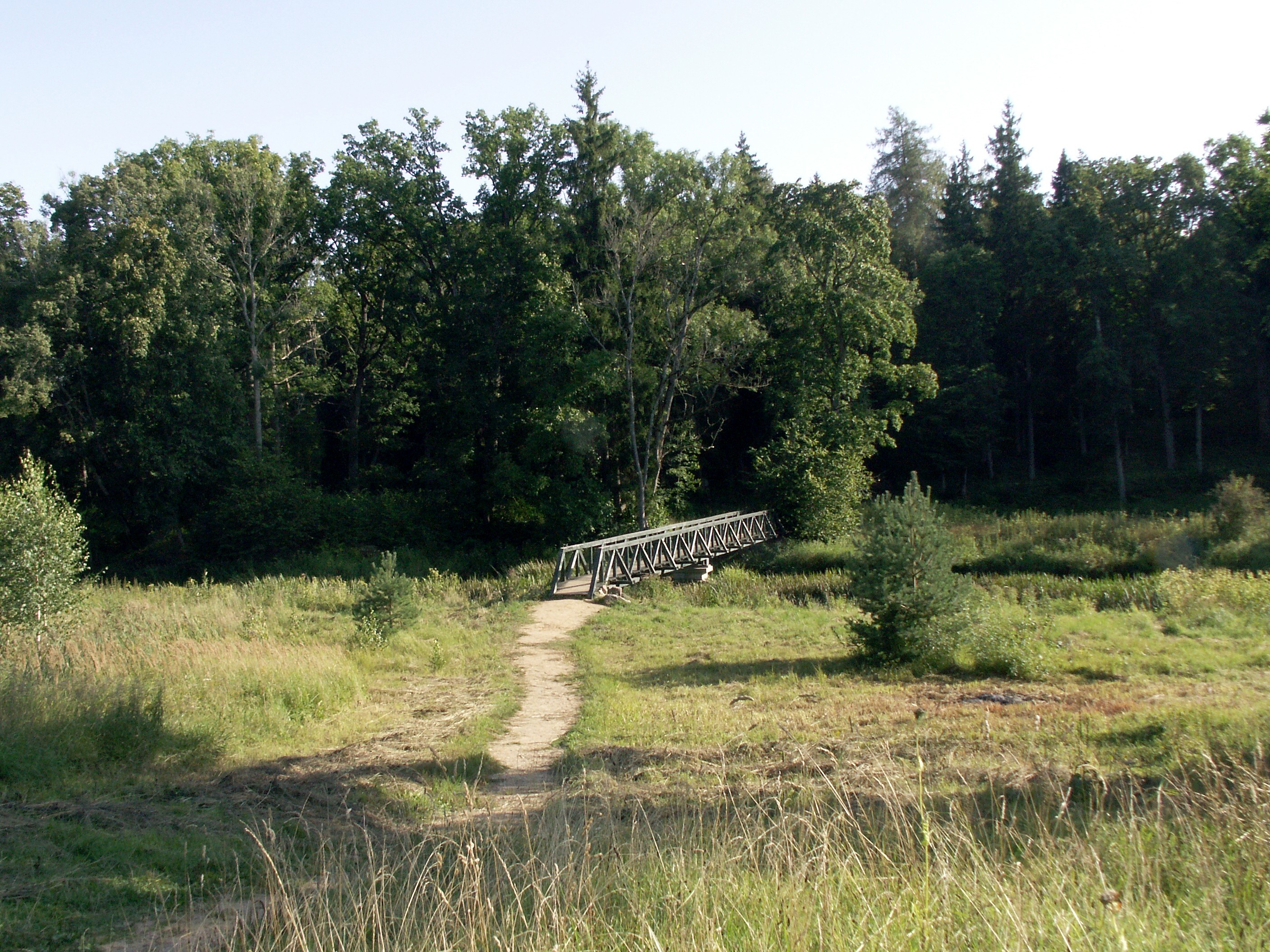
Bridge over Varduva

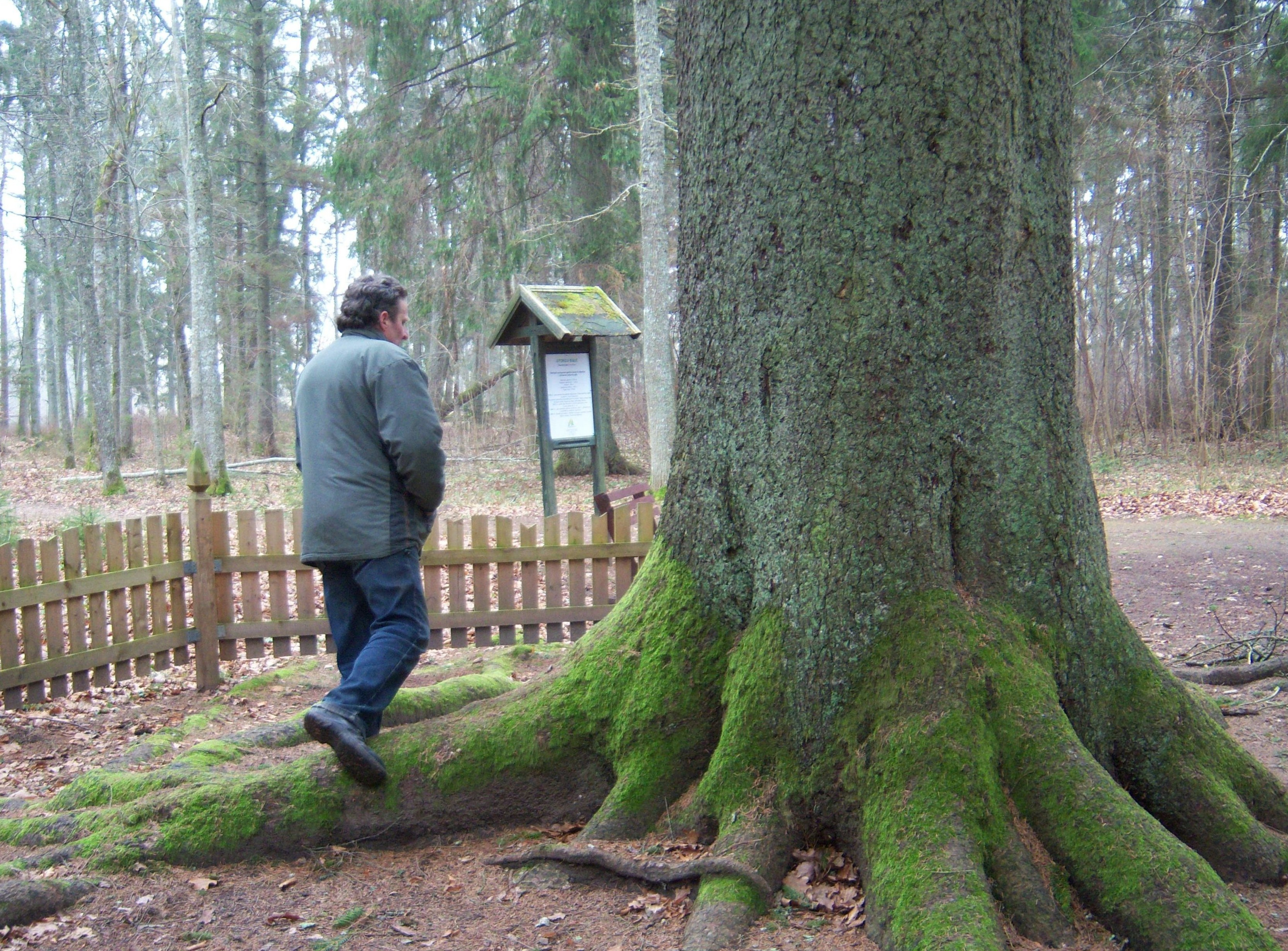
The largest Norway spruce in Lithuania

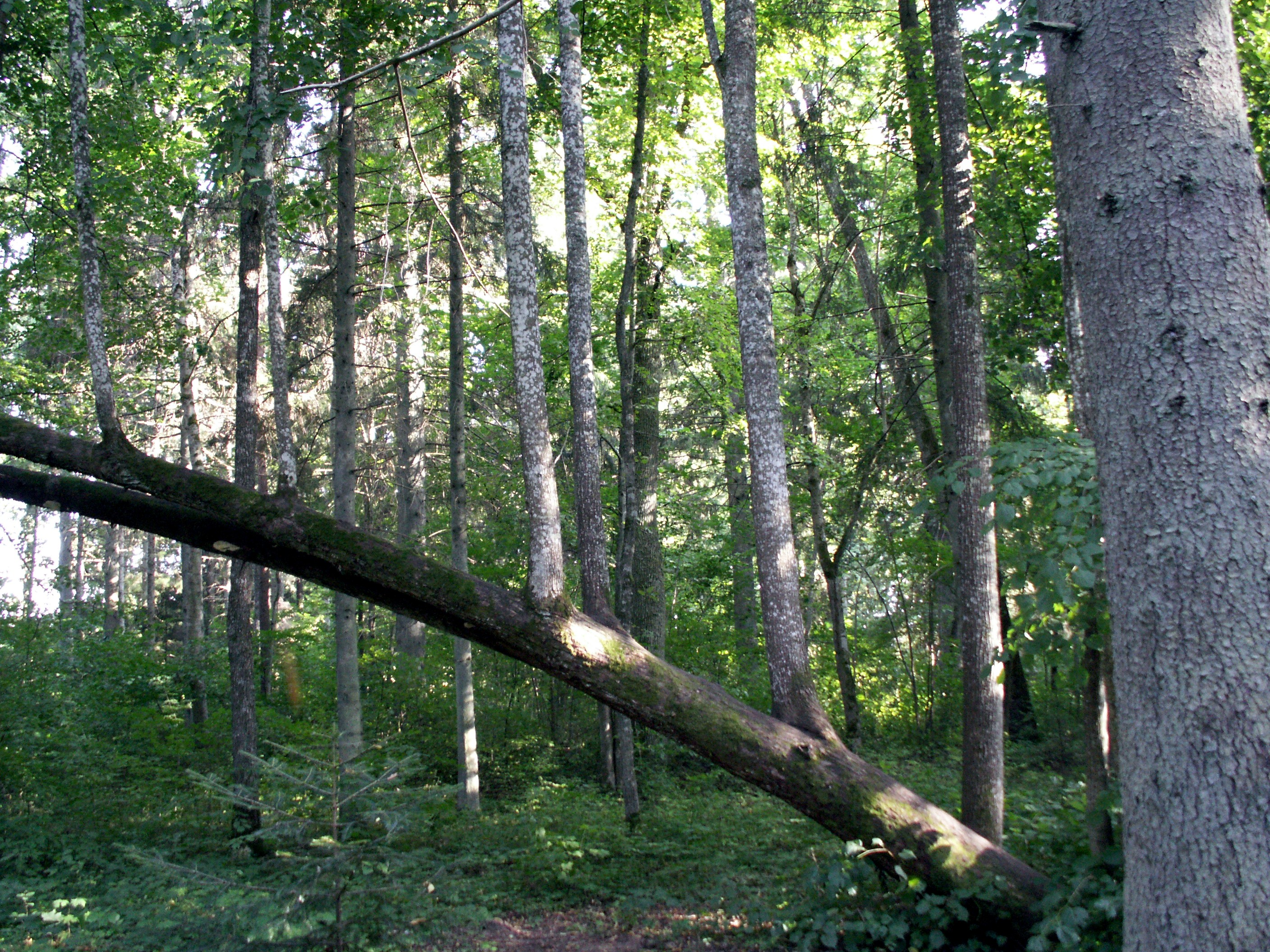
Lime tree

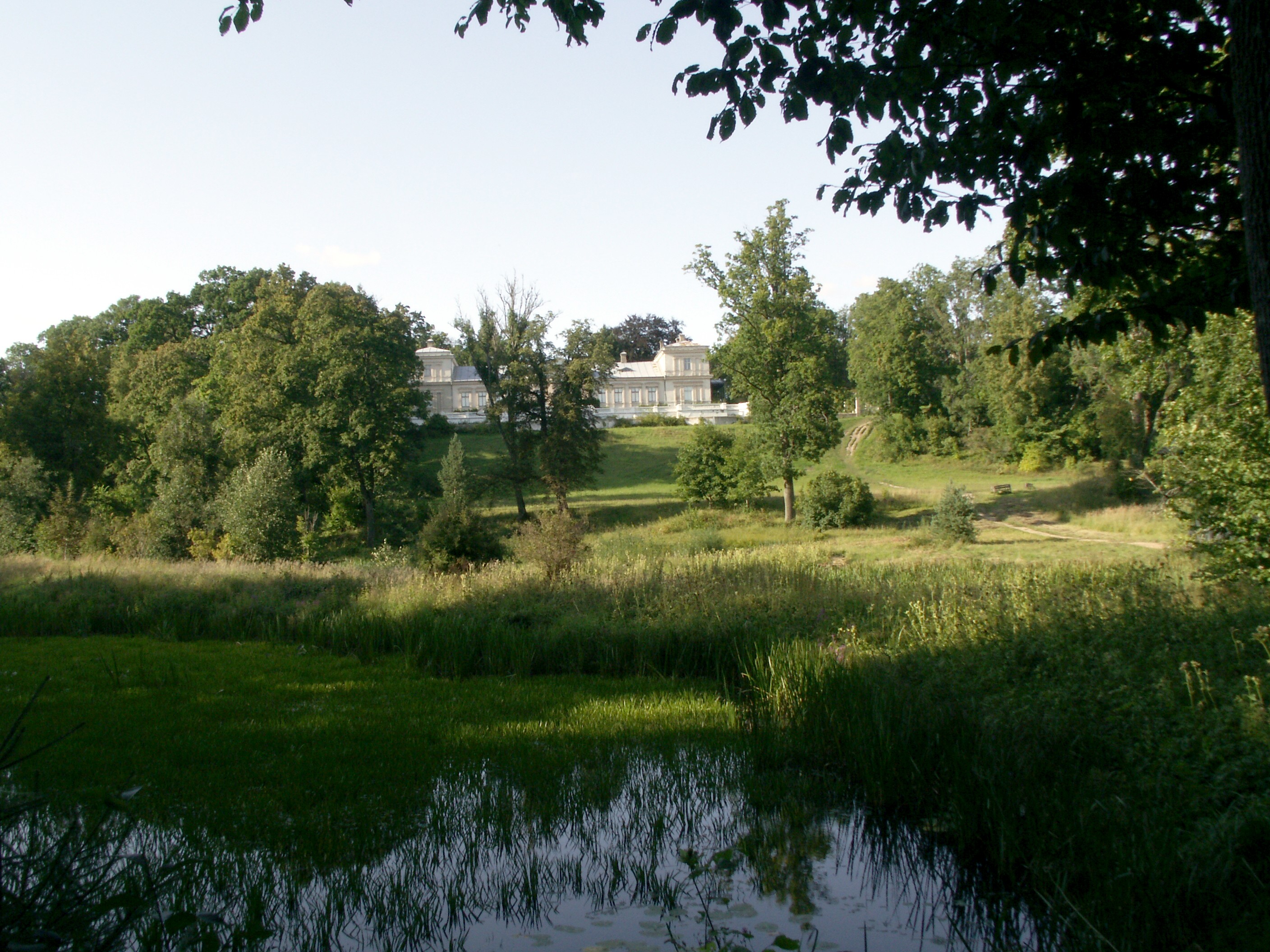
Manor from the Varduva river

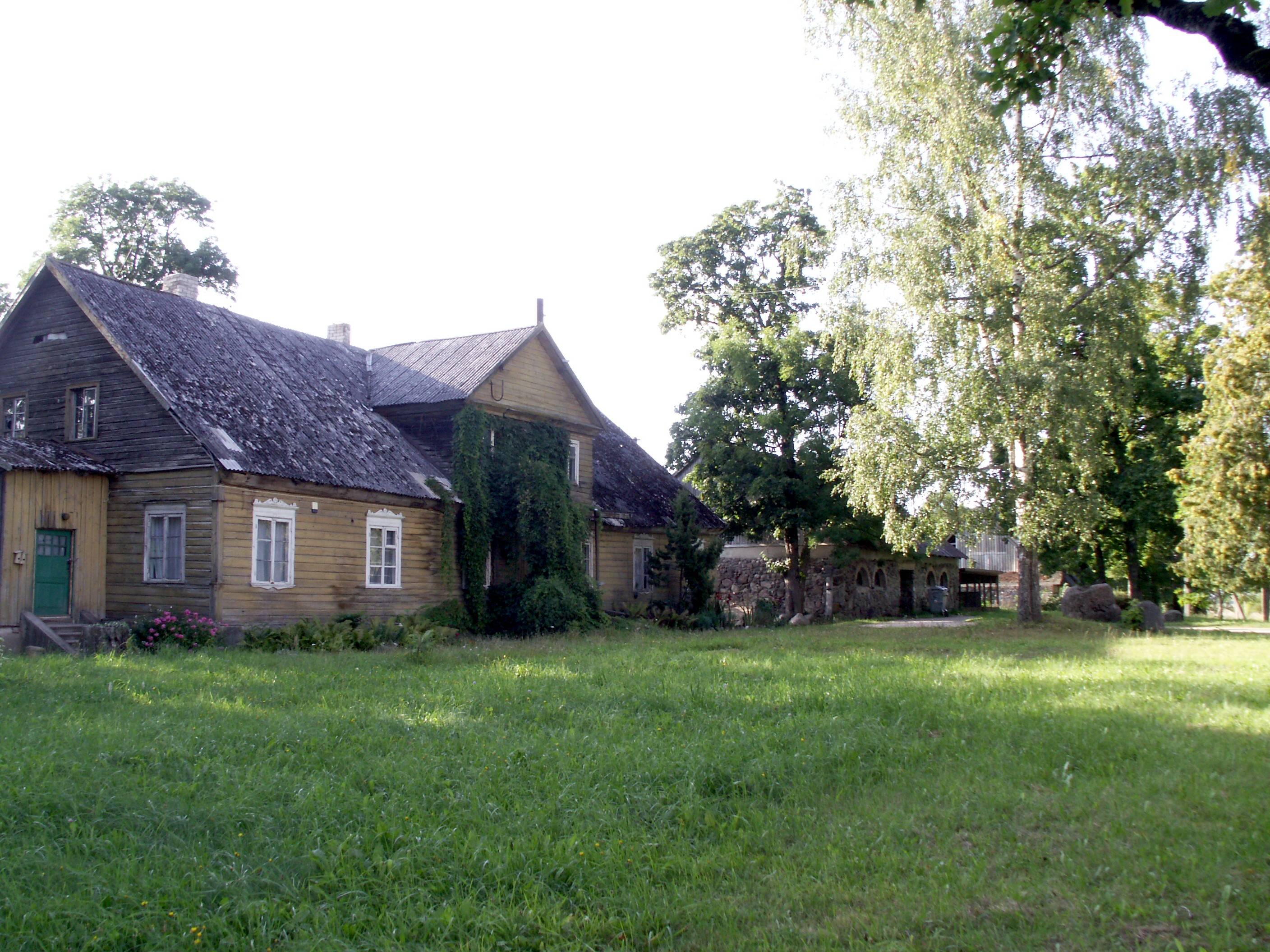
Manor buildings

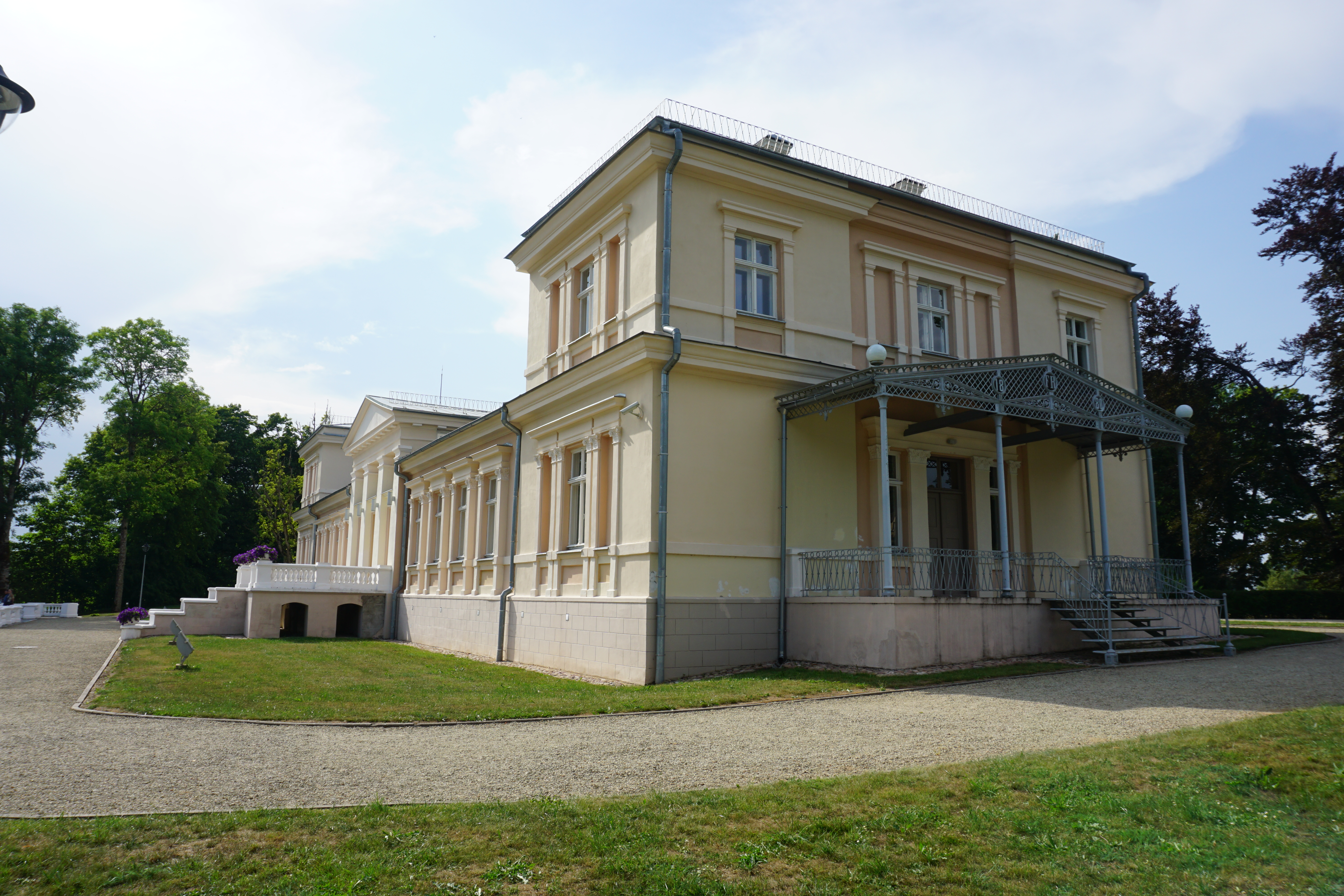
Manor in 2018

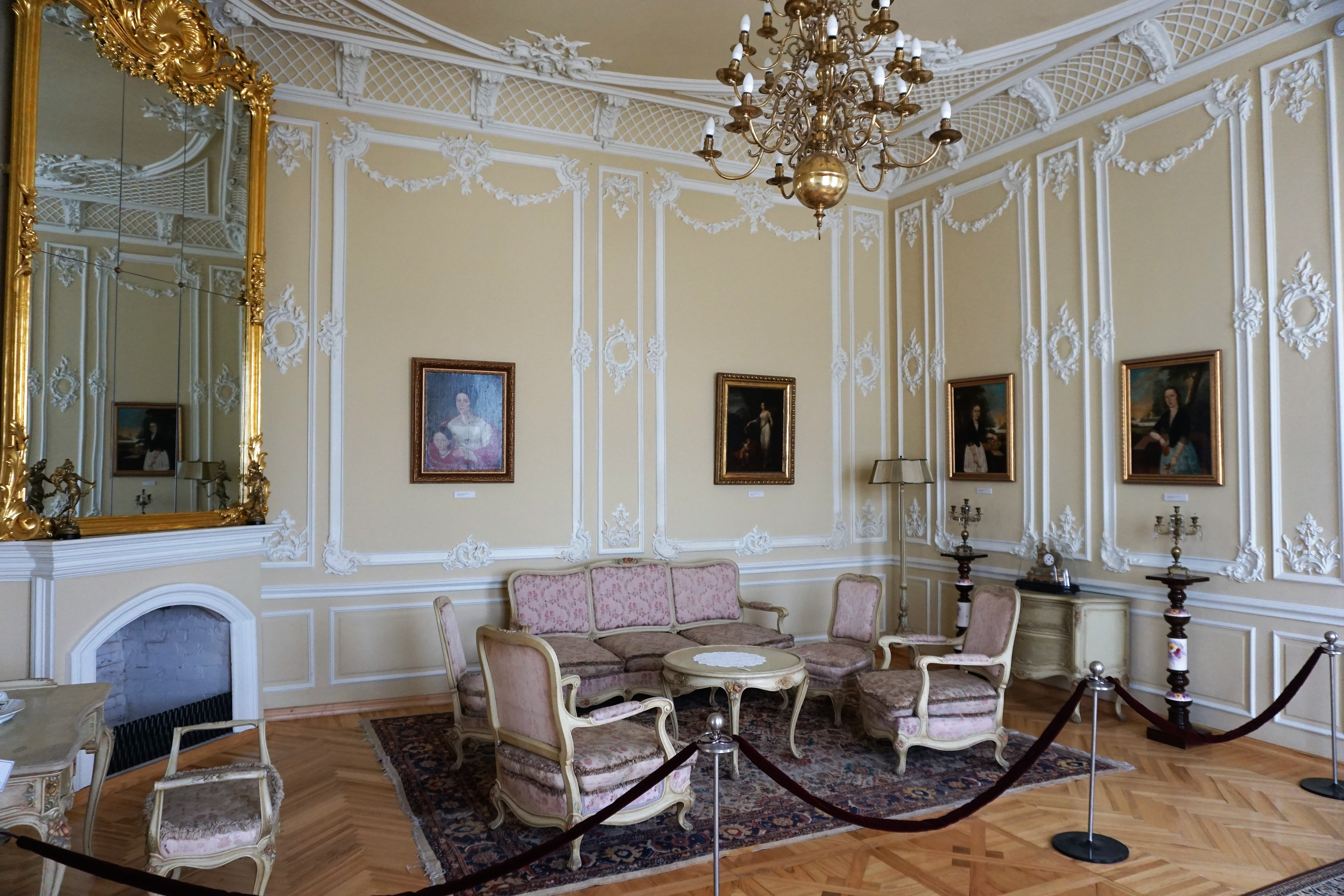
Interior of the palace

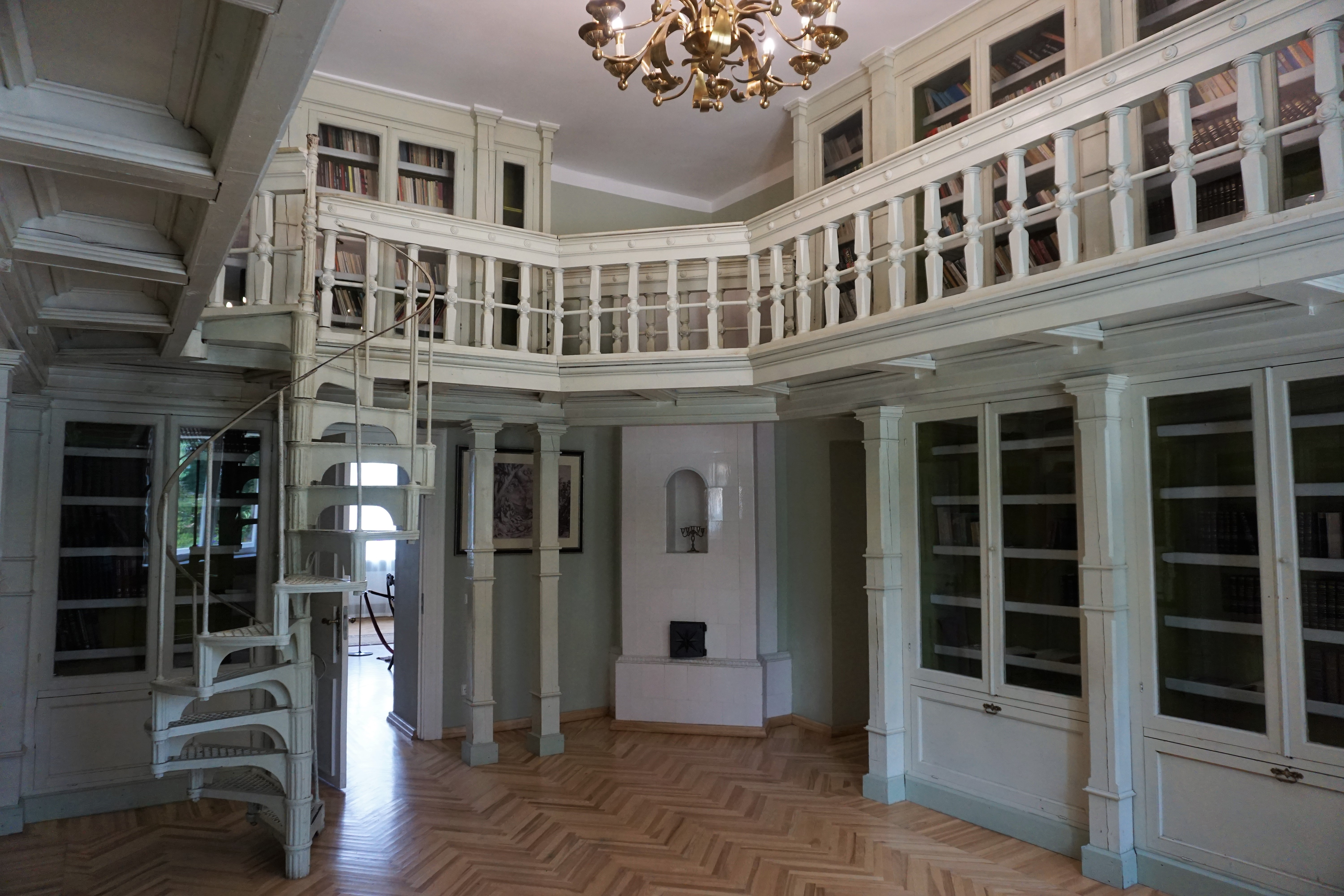
Library in the palace
