= Vincas Juška =

Lithuanian book smuggler

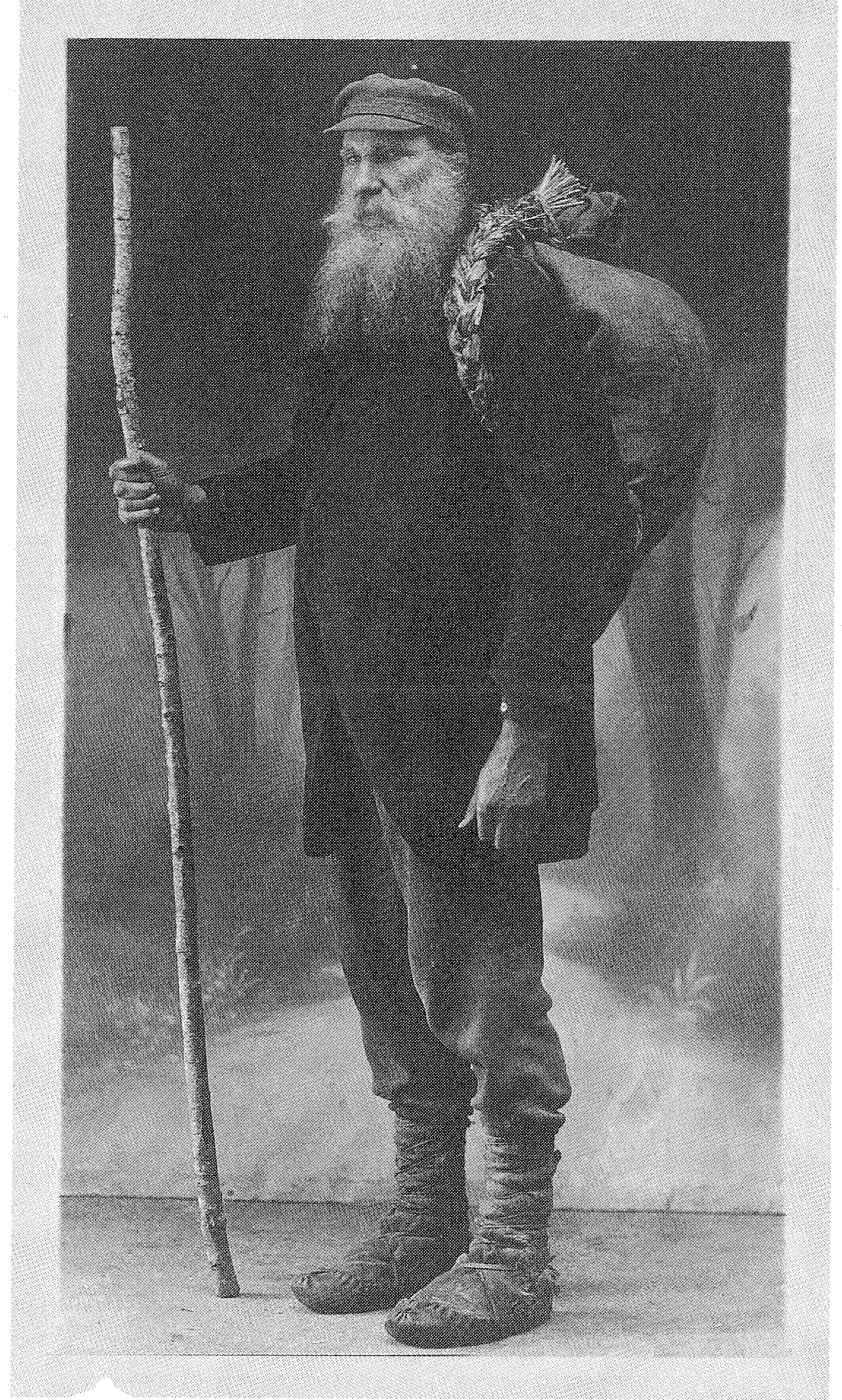
- Born: Vincentas Juška; 20 November 1860; Rubikai, Kovno Governorate, Russian Empire
- Died: 17 January 1939 (aged 78); Žemaičių Kalvarija, Lithuania
- Burial place: Žemaičių Kalvarija cemetery
- Occupation: Lithuanian book smuggler
- Years active: 1880–1905
- Children: Genovaitė Šamatauskienė-Juškaitė

Vincentas Juška (28 November 1860 – 17 January 1939) was a Lithuanian book smuggler.

== Biography ==
Vincentas Juška was born to a peasant family on 28 November 1860 in the village of Rubikai, which at that time belonged to the Kovno Governorate of the Russian Empire. He attended school in Seda, but could not finish it due to lack of funding. When his father died, Juška's brother inherited the estate instead of him, so Juška decided to travel to Žemaičių Kalvarija, where he settled down and started a family.

Juška's first wife was Kotryna Jukšienė, and after her death, Juška's second wife became Ona Aleksaitė. It is believed that he began smuggling illegally around 1880. From 1884, Juška began smuggling illegal press from the city of Tilsit (now the city of Sovetsk), going to collect the papers alone and distribute them by himself.

On numerous occasions Juška was shot at and chased by the police. At one point he escaped after he was arrested in Gargždai and driven to Alsėdžiai. In 1892 the Governorate-General of Vilno Ivan Kakhanov sentenced him to 14 days of arrest for illegal distribution. In 1894 he was arrested in a market in Seda, however, in an attempt to escape, he threw his books out which later became evidence. Juška's illegal goods were mostly religious content, as well as anti-government article calendars.

In 1895 the Tsar of Russia ordered Juška to be punished by deportation to the Vologda Governorate for 2 years. After the coronation of Nicholas II and Alexandra Feodorovna, a manifesto was published that expressed the gratitude of the monarch to the inhabitants of Moscow. This helped Juška be released in the Summer of 1896.

Until 12 March 1903, Juška was forced to live in Riga under police surveillance. He would secretly travel to Žemaičių Kalvarija to collect books to smuggle back into Riga's local Lithuanian inhabitants. He was tracked by the police again, and in 1900 was accused of distributing illegal literature. He participated in the 1905 Russian Revolution, where he distributed the social democratic press and gave anti-war speeches.

To avoid arrest, Juška moved to the United States, where he worked in a coal mine. He returned to Lithuania in 1924 and settled down once again in Žemaičių Kalvarija. From 1 November 1929 Juška was given a book smuggler's pension of 40 litai. He died on 17 January 1939.

== Remembrance ==
He was buried in the Žemaičių Kalvarija Cemetery, where an appropriate sign was erected. In 1985 a roof post was made in his honor which now sits near the Žemaičių Kalvarija middle school. A monument was erected in the Varduva cemetery under the incentive of Juška's daughter Genovaitė Šamatauskienė. The words "Children, love the book" were engraved on the monument. It was included in the list of cultural monuments of the Lithuanian SSR. Genovaitė also wrote a book of memoirs about her father. His name is engraved in the Book Smugglers' Wall at the Vytautas the Great War Museum.
