= St. Isidore Cathedral, Holguín =

Coordinates: 20°53′7.6″N 76°15′27.6″W

St. Isidore Cathedral
- Catedral de San Isidoro
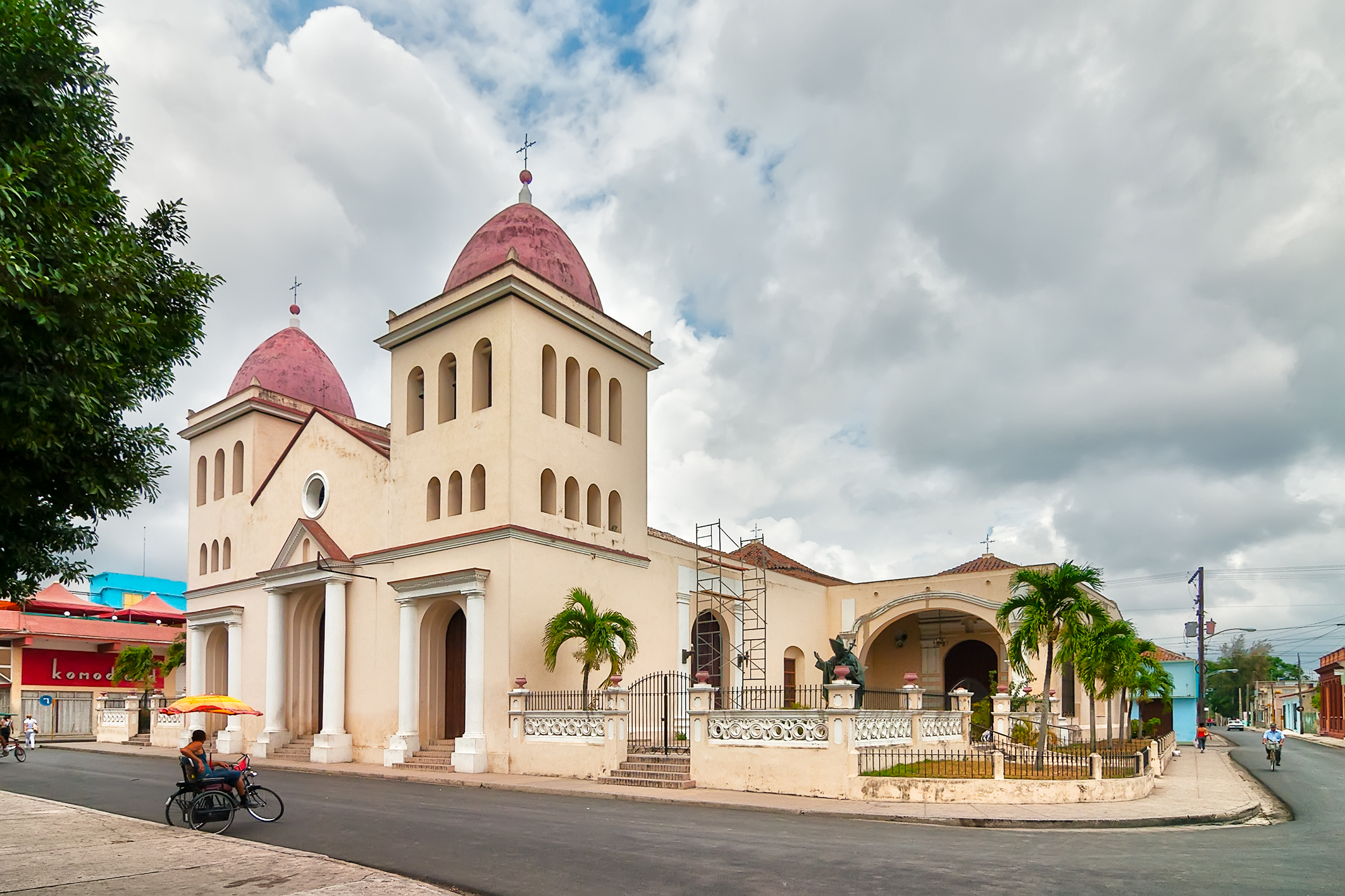
- St. Isidore Cathedral
- Location: Holguín
- Country: Cuba
- Denomination: Roman Catholic Church

The St. Isidore Cathedral (Spanish: Catedral de San Isidoro) also called Holguín Cathedral It is the main temple of the Catholic Church in the Diocese of Holguín, is located in the city of Holguín, on the Caribbean island of Cuba.

The first church dedicated to San Isidoro (St. Isidore), was designed by architect D. Diego de Ávila y de la Torre and was blessed on April 3, 1720 when Cuba was still under the rule of the Spanish Empire.

The present cathedral of San Isidoro, inaugurated as parish church between 1818 and 1820, is a construction structure with a "T". The church was elevated to the status of cathedral in 1979 under the pontificate of Pope John Paul II and officially consecrated in 1996. It is a solid building with three large doors and recessed columns and a pediment in the center that defines the facade. Its interior Moriscos have finely crafted wood ceilings.

== See also ==
- Roman Catholicism in Cuba
- St. Isidore Church
