= Lithuanian press ban =

Russian ban on Lithuanian language publications in the Latin alphabet

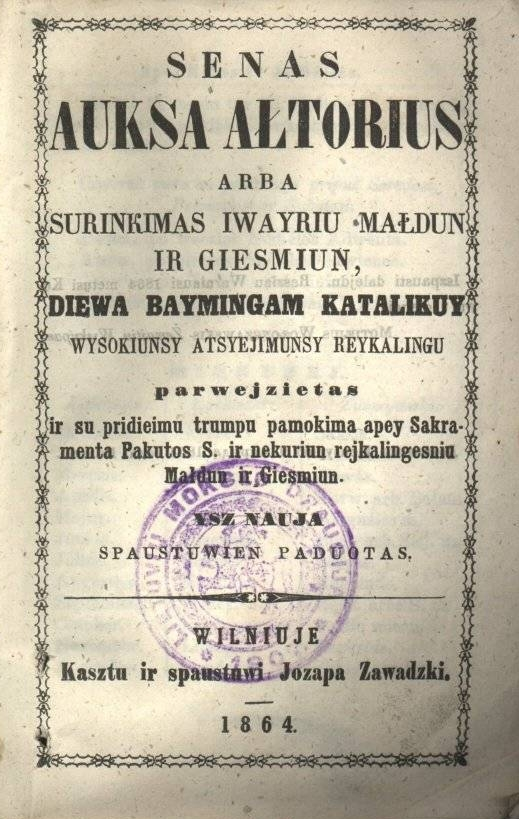
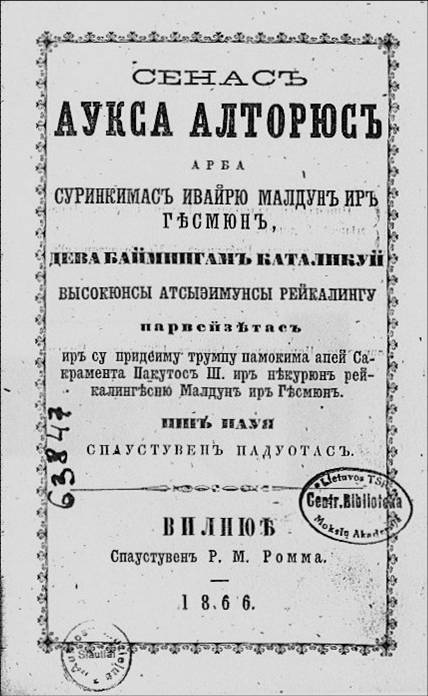
Two issues of the same Lithuanian prayer book, Auksa altorius (Golden Altar). The one on the left was illegal because it was in the Latin alphabet. The other, in Cyrillic script, was legal and paid for by the government.

The Lithuanian press ban (Lithuanian: spaudos draudimas) was a ban on all Lithuanian language publications printed in the Latin alphabet, in force from 1865 to 1904, within the Russian Empire, which controlled Lithuania proper at the time. Lithuanian-language publications that used Cyrillic were allowed and even encouraged by those seeking the Russification of Lithuanians.

The concept arose after the failed January Uprising of 1863, taking the form of an administrative order in 1864, and was not lifted until 24 April 1904. The Russian courts reversed two convictions in press ban cases in 1902 and 1903, and the setbacks of the Russo-Japanese War in early 1904 brought about a loosened Russian policy towards minorities.

Under the ban, it was illegal to print, import, distribute, or possess any publications in the Latin alphabet. Tsarist authorities hoped that this measure, part of a larger Russification plan, would decrease Polish influence on Lithuanians and would return them to what were considered their ancient historical ties with Russia. However, Lithuanians organized printing outside the Empire, largely in Lithuania Minor (East Prussia), and in the United States.

Knygnešiai (Lithuanian book smugglers) smuggled illegal books and periodicals across the border. The number of such publications kept increasing despite strict sanctions and persecution of the activists. The ban created a well-defined and organized opposition to Russian rule and culture—the opposite of its original intent. The Lithuanian historian Edvardas Gudavičius has described the ban as a test of the concept of Lithuania: had there been no resistance, the language would have become a historical footnote.

== Background ==
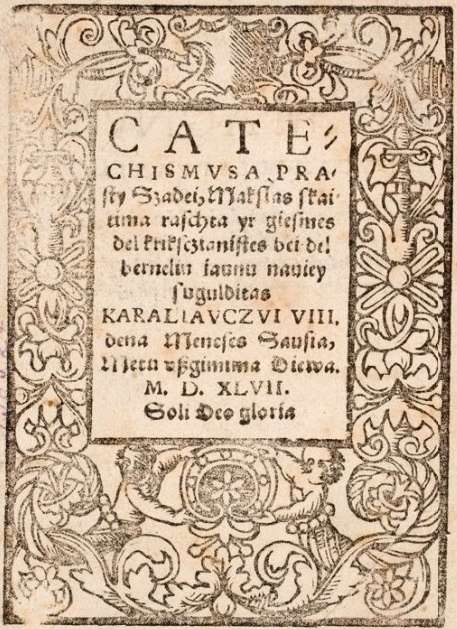
Catechism of Martynas Mažvydas published in 1547

The first book published in print in the Lithuanian language was Lutheran Catechism of Martynas Mažvydas in 1547. Other milestone publications included Daniel Klein's Grammar in 1653, a publication of the Bible in 1735, and the first work of fiction, Kristijonas Donelaitis' Metai (The Seasons), in 1818. During the years of the Polish–Lithuanian Commonwealth, which lasted from 1569 to 1795, the Polish language gained ground as the written lingua franca of greater Lithuania, although the Prussian areas of Lithuania Minor continued to issue publications in Lithuanian.

At the beginning of the 19th century, use of the Lithuanian language was largely limited to Lithuanian rural areas, apart from its use in Prussia; it was, however, retained by some members of the minor nobility, especially in the Samogitian region. Several factors contributed to its subsequent revival: the language drew attention from scholars of the emerging science of comparative linguistics; after the abolition of serfdom in the Russian Empire in 1861, social mobility increased, and Lithuanian intellectuals arose from the ranks of the rural populace; and language became associated with identity in Lithuania, as elsewhere across Europe. Within the Catholic Church, the barriers that had earlier prevented commoners from entering the priesthood were eased. A closer relationship developed between the educated clergy, who were increasingly of ethnic Lithuanian stock, and their parishioners, including a sympathy with their wish to use the Lithuanian language. The emerging national movement sought to distance itself from both Polish and Russian influences, and the use of the Lithuanian language was seen as an important aspect of this movement.

According to the bibliographer Vaclovas Biržiška, between 1800 and 1864, when the press ban was enacted, 926 book titles were published in the Lithuanian language using its Latin alphabet. The orthography of the language was not standardized; this problem was used by the Russian authorities as a rationale for the change to Cyrillic.

== Origins and legal basis ==
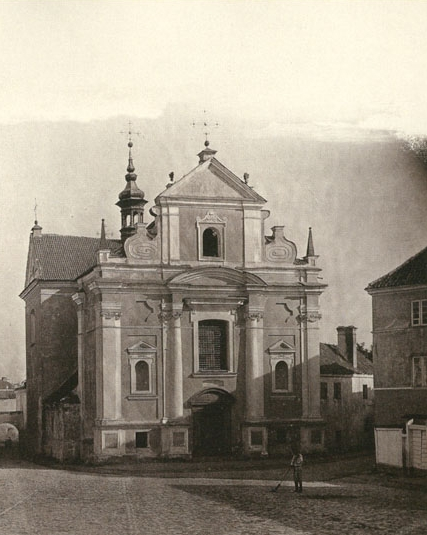
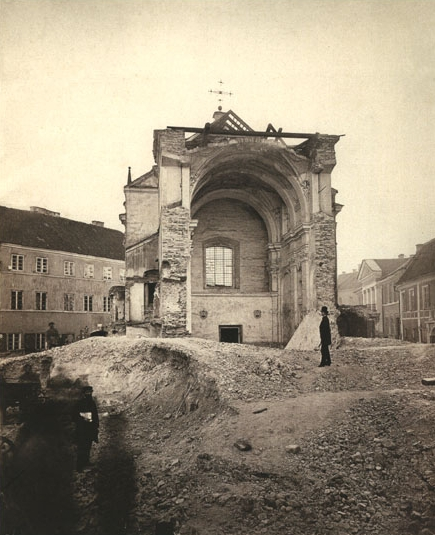
The Program of Restoration of Russian Beginnings at work: Catholic Church of St. Joseph the Betrothed in Vilnius before and during its demolition in 1877.
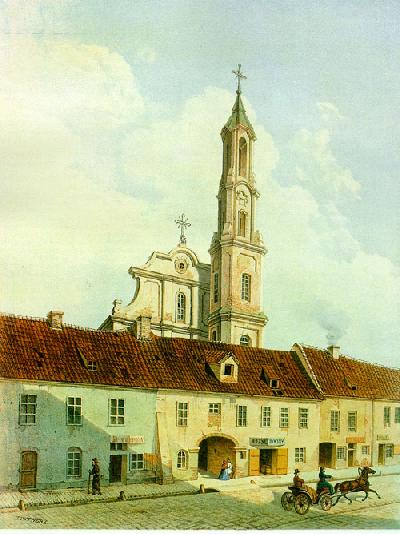
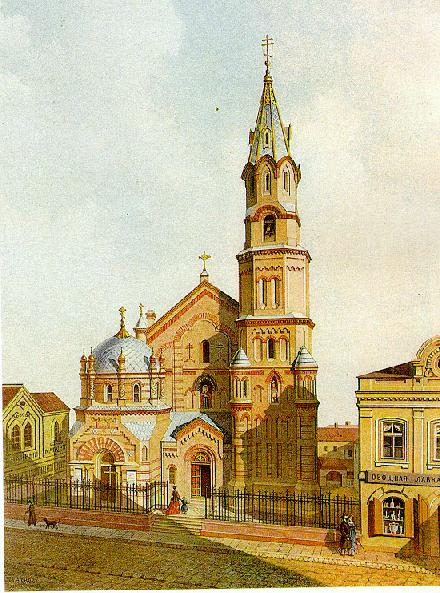
The Program of Restoration of Russian Beginnings at work: Orthodox Church of St. Nicholas in Vilnius before and after its reconstruction in 1864.

After the partitions of the Polish-Lithuanian Commonwealth in the late 18th century, significant portions of Lithuania and Poland were incorporated into the Russian Empire. The uprising of 1863, seeking to re-establish the Commonwealth, convinced many Russian politicians that Polish cultural and political influence was the main obstacle hindering the Russification of Lithuania. They believed that if the Lithuanian peasantry were distanced from the Polonized nobility and the Catholic Church, Lithuanians would naturally come under Russian cultural influence, as they had allegedly been during previous eras. The Russian politician Nikolai Miliutin wrote that "Russian letters will finish that which was begun with the Russian sword."

On 13 May 1863, Tsar Alexander II of Russia appointed Mikhail Nikolayevich Muravyov as the governor-general of Vilna. His duties included both suppression of the uprising, and implementation of the Russification policy. Because the situation was perceived as critical, Muravyov was temporarily granted extremely wide powers. Muravyov and Ivan Petrovich Kornilov, the newly appointed director of the Vilna Educational District, prepared a radical long-term Russification program that became known as the Program of Restoration of Russian Beginnings (Lithuanian: Rusų pradų atkūrimo programa). Its stated goals were to:

1. Eliminate the Polish language from public life
2. Prevent the employment of Catholics in government institutions
3. Control and restrict the Catholic Church
4. Create favorable conditions for the spread of Eastern Orthodoxy
5. Replace Lithuanian parish schools with Russian grammar schools
6. Encourage ethnic Russians to resettle in Lithuanian lands
7. Replace the Latin alphabet with the Cyrillic alphabet
8. Ban any Lithuanian-language publications in the Latin alphabet.

On 22 May 1864, Tsar Alexander II approved this program. A few days later, on 5 June 1864, governor-general issued an administrative order that forbade printing Lithuanian language textbooks written in the "Polish characters". This order was developed into a comprehensive ban on 6 September 1865 by Konstantin Petrovich von Kaufman, Muravyov's successor. Kaufman issued an order to six neighboring governorates declaring a full ban on publication, import and distribution of all Lithuanian texts in the Latin alphabet, and demanding that censorship committees enforce it without hesitation. A week later, the order was extended to the entire empire by Pyotr Valuev, Minister of the Interior. In 1866, the ban was further extended to include all academic books.

Despite its strict and widespread enforcement, none of the ban's supporting measures were ever actually codified into law. The ban was enforced based solely on administrative orders and the tsar's approval. When the special temporary powers of the governor-general were revoked in 1871, these administrative orders lost any legal value. From that point on, the ban had no legal basis, but it was still strictly enforced.

== Enforcement ==
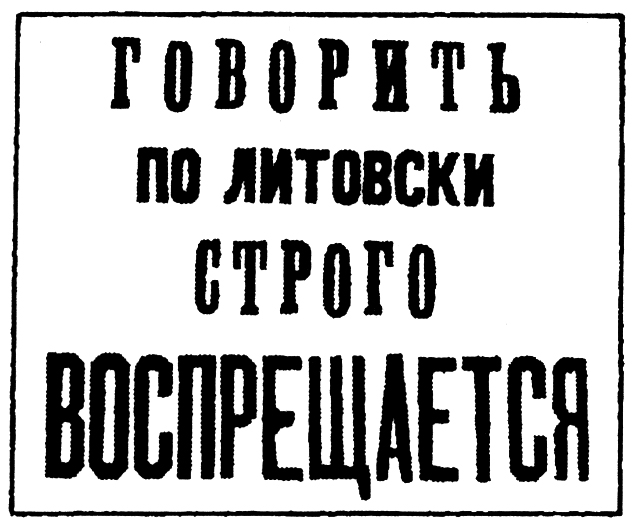
Russian sign proclaiming that speaking Lithuanian is strictly forbidden

At first, the Russian authorities encouraged and sponsored the publication of Lithuanian-language works in the Cyrillic alphabet. The idea of replacing the Latin alphabet with Cyrillic was first elaborated by the well-known Pan-Slavist Alexander Hilferding in his 1863 book Lithuania and Samogitia.

The first experiments with the conversion of Lithuanian writings into Cyrillic were conducted by a Lithuanian linguist, Jonas Juška. He showed some samples of adapted texts to both Muravyov and Kornilov in February 1864. However, Juška discontinued his work, and Kornilov formed a committee to work on publishing Lithuanian books in Cyrillic. The committee had four members: the Polish librarian Stanisław Mikucki from Warsaw, Russian Jonas Kerčinskis, a Lithuanian Catholic priest, Antanas Petkevičius, who had converted to Eastern Orthodoxy, and the well-known Lithuanian educator and publisher Laurynas Ivinskis. Ivinskis soon withdrew from the committee. The first such book was a primer intended for use in the new Russian schools that were replacing the Lithuanian parish schools. It appeared during the summer of 1864. The committee also published a prayer book, a calendar, and other religious literature.

About 55 Lithuanian-Cyrillic titles were published during the 40 years of the ban; about half of these were published during its first decade. Seeing that the Lithuanian people were unwilling to accept these books, even when they were offered for free, the Russian government shifted its attention to eliminating the illegal publications.

The Russian Ministry of Education issued a report in May 1898 recommending that the press ban be repealed. The report stated that the ban had produced adverse and unforeseen results, including the development of Lithuanian nationalism. Other Russian officials had opined that the interests of the Russian state would be better served by the presence of a legal Lithuanian press that could be censored.

During the years of the ban, 3,047 people (829 smugglers, 859 distributors, and 1,359 persons possessing banned books) were arrested in connection with the ban.

== Resistance ==
Illegal non-periodical publications
Period	Number of titles
1865–1874	345
1875–1884	501
1885–1894	1,076
1895–1904	2,031
Total	3,953

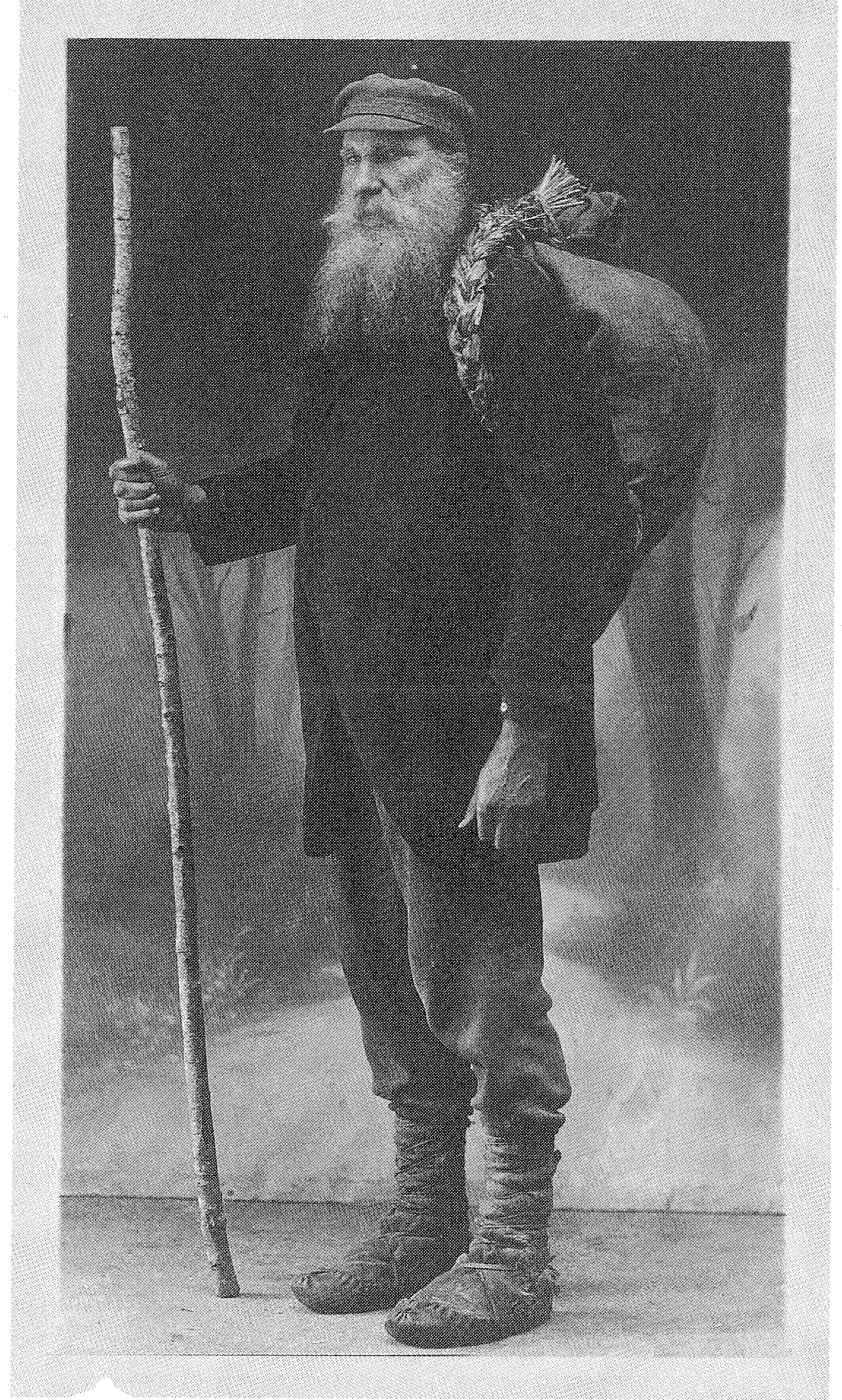
Lithuanian book smuggler Vincas Juška

Anti-Russian sentiment and distrust of the tsarist authorities had arisen after the 1863 revolt. The ban was also perceived as a threat to the Catholic Church; the Eastern Orthodox Church used the Cyrillic alphabet, and loyalty to the Latin alphabet was also a symbolic loyalty to Catholicism. Attempts were made to circumvent the ban by using Gothic script. However, that was also banned in 1872. A number of problems arose with the various Lithuanian-Cyrillic orthographies, which were all criticized as ill-adapted to the Lithuanian language. Within Russia, the ban was opposed by scholarly, liberal, and pro-democratic groups, which served to mitigate the punishments.

The organized resistance to the ban, both legal and illegal, was largely initiated by bishop Motiejus Valančius, who petitioned the government to exempt prayer books from the ban. He then moved towards sponsoring the illegal flow of books from outside Lithuania. The period from Valančius's death in 1875 to 1883 saw the establishment of the Lithuanian-language newspaper Auszra (The Dawn), and the resistance at this time is associated with bishop Antanas Baranauskas. The resistance intensified towards the end of the 19th century, after another major newspaper, Varpas (The Bell), edited by Vincas Kudirka, was established in 1889. Between 1891 and 1893, 31,718 publications were confiscated and destroyed; between 1900 and 1902, this number increased to 56,182, reflecting their increased flow.

The period from 1890 to 1904 saw the publication of about 2,500 book titles in the Lithuanian Latin alphabet. The majority of these were published in Tilsit, a city in the German Empire, although some publications reached Lithuania from the United States. A largely standardized written version of the language was achieved by the turn of the twentieth century, based on historical and Aukštaitijan (highland) usages; the letters č and š were taken from Czech orthography. The widely accepted Lithuanian Grammar, by Jonas Jablonskis, appeared in 1901.

A number of challenges to the ban's legal basis were made, and the use of this venue intensified at the end of the 19th century, along with an increasing number of letters, petitions, and protests from Lithuanians. In 1902 and 1903, the Russian Governing Senate reversed two press ban convictions that had been brought against Antanas Macijauskas and Povilas Višinskis. The court's decisions stated that the original executive decree creating the ban was illegal. The outbreak of the Russo-Japanese War in February 1904 contributed to the Russian government's perception that its minorities needed to be accommodated. The ban was officially lifted on 24 April 1904 by Nicholas II.

== Effect on education ==
Public and private education in Lithuanian was adversely affected by the press ban. The level of pent-up demand for schooling in the 19th century is illustrated by the increase in literacy in the Rietavas area; between 1853 and 1863, just before the ban, the number of literate persons rose from 11,296 to 24,330. The subsequent ban is thought to have contributed to illiteracy in 19th-century Lithuania.

In the wake of the ruling, parish schools were closed. A shortage of teachers led to the closure of a number of state schools as well, in spite of population growth. Parents began to withdraw their children from the state schools, since they were associated with the policy of Russification; students were not allowed to speak Lithuanian among themselves, and a discouraging atmosphere was created by the system of searches, inspections, and spying. Many students were schooled at home or at the clandestine Lithuanian schools, although this practice also resulted in sanctions.

A census of the Kovno Governorate in 1897 showed that a higher proportion of older people than younger had received formal education: of persons age 30 to 39, 61.87% had experienced some level of formal education, compared to only 54.68% of persons aged 10 to 19.

== Aftermath ==
After the ban was lifted, printing presses and their supporting social and cultural infrastructure needed to be established. The first issue of a Lithuanian newspaper after the ban, Vilniaus žinios, appeared on 23 December 1904; the Great Seimas of Vilnius, which took place in November 1905, was now able to issue its announcements and publications in Lithuanian.

The publishing houses of Martynas Kukta, Saliamonas Banaitis, and the Society of Saint Casimir in Kaunas were responsible for many of the publications issued between the end of the ban in 1904 and the restoration of Lithuanian independence in 1918. The businessman Petras Vileišis installed a printing press at his palace, commissioned in 1904. During this period, 4,734 Lithuanian-language titles in the Latin alphabet were published in Lithuania and abroad. After Lithuanian independence was established, the rate of publication increased steadily; 16,721 book titles were printed from 1918 to 1939. Between 1925 and 1939, about 800 to 900 book titles were printed annually.

A standard Lithuanian orthography and grammar were established during the ban, despite the fact that the co-ordination of this process, involving competing dialects, was forced to take place in several countries. The ban is widely felt to have stimulated the Lithuanian national movement, rather than discouraging it. In 2004, the 100th anniversary of the ban's end was noted in UNESCO's events calendar, and the Lithuanian Seimas declared the "Year of the Lithuanian Language and Book."

== See also ==
- List of Lithuanian-language periodicals (up to 1904)

== Bibliography ==
- Staliūnas, Darius (2007). Making Russians. Meaning and Practice of Russification in Lithuania and Belarus after 1863. Amsterdam—New York: Rodopi. ISBN 978-90-420-2267-6.
