= Church of St. Isidore, Renavas =

Roman Catholic church in Lithuania

St. Isidore Church Šv. Izidoriaus bažnyčia
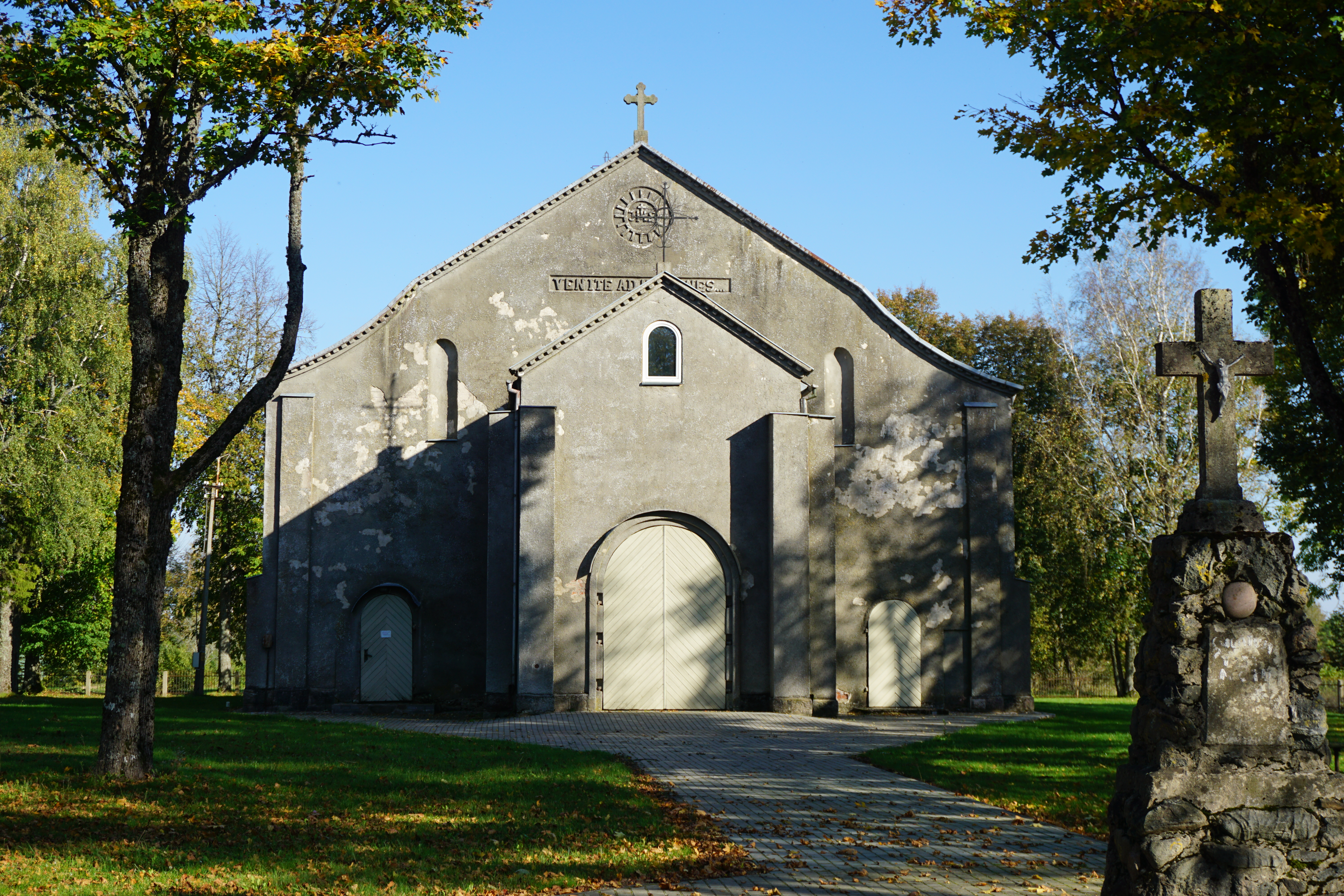
- Renavas Church of St. Isidore

Religion
- Affiliation: Roman Catholic
- Year consecrated: 1933

Location
- Location: Renavas, Lithuania
- Interactive map of St. Isidore Church; Šv. Izidoriaus bažnyčia
- Coordinates: 56°13′51″N 22°3′36″E

Architecture
- Type: Church
- Completed: 1933
- Construction cost: LTL 31.795,60

Specifications
- Direction of façade: West
- Materials: concrete

St. Isidore Church (Lithuanian: Šv. Izidoriaus bažnyčia, Samogitian: Šv. Ėzėduoriaus bažnīče) is a Roman Catholic church in Renavas, Lithuania. It is located near the road Židikai–Seda.

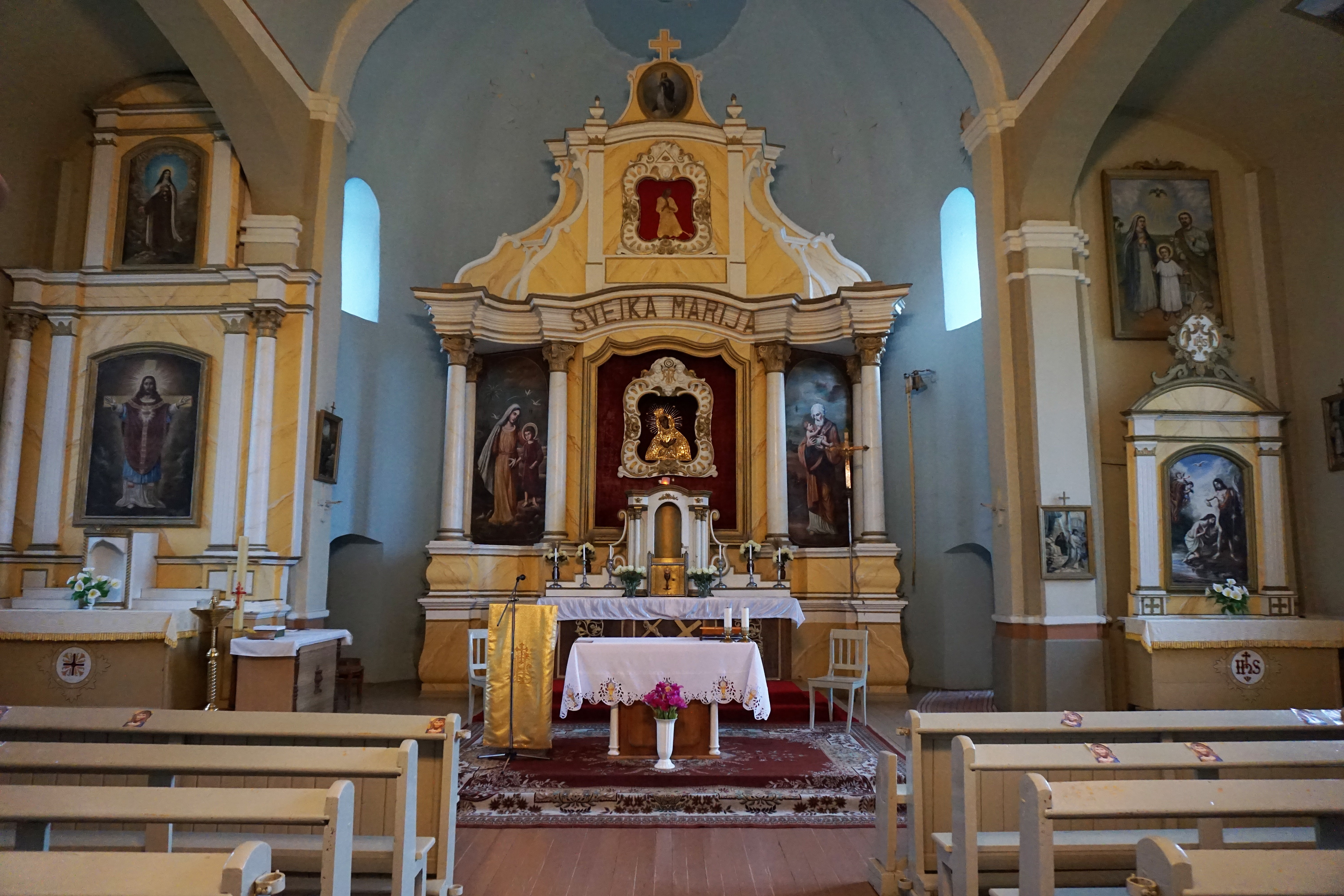
Interior of the Church with all three altars to be seen

== History ==
The construction of the church started in 1918 after Lithuania re-established its independence. However, after the walls of 2.5 m height were built, the construction stopped. The works began to continue only in 1929 and the construction was completed in 1933. Because of lack of money and in order to finish the project, constructors of the church refused exterior decoration foreseen in the primary projects. Consequently, the outside walls were made only of concrete.

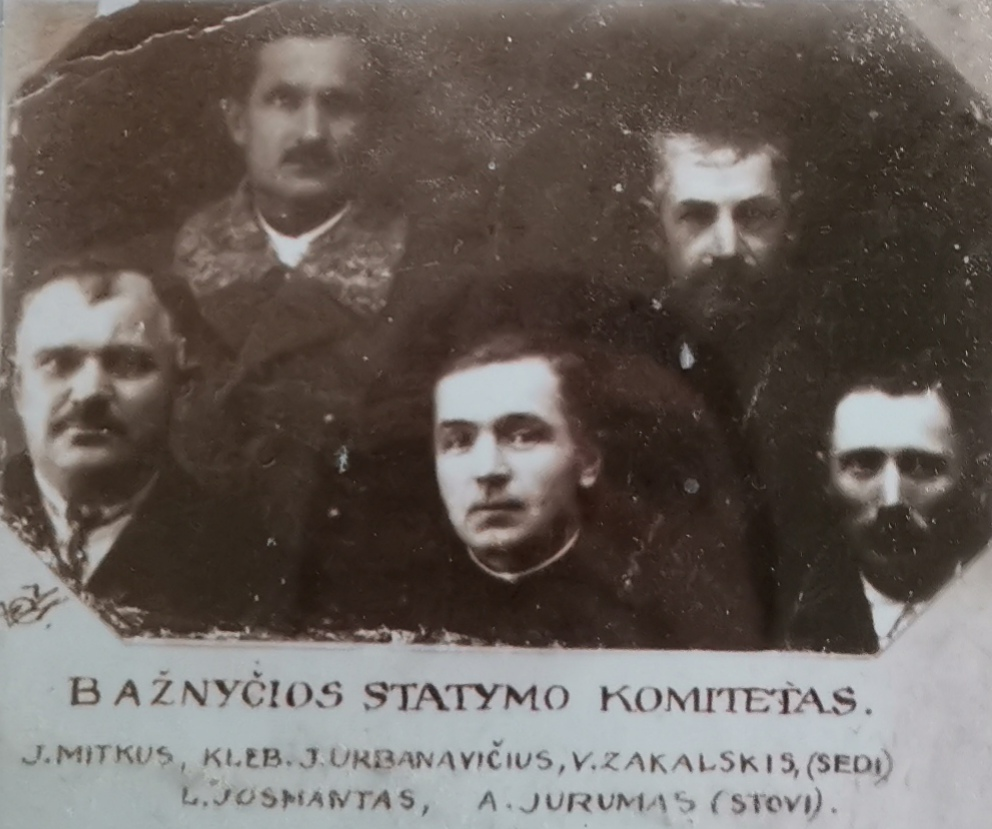
Committee for the construction of the church

The Church was consecrated on 12 June 1933 by the first bishop of Telšiai Justinas Staugaitis.

Current parson of the Renavas parish is a priest Dainoras Židackas who also serves as the priest of St. John the Baptist Church, Židikai.

The Church is rectangle with a small tower and a porch.
