= Seda, Lithuania =

Seda
- Town
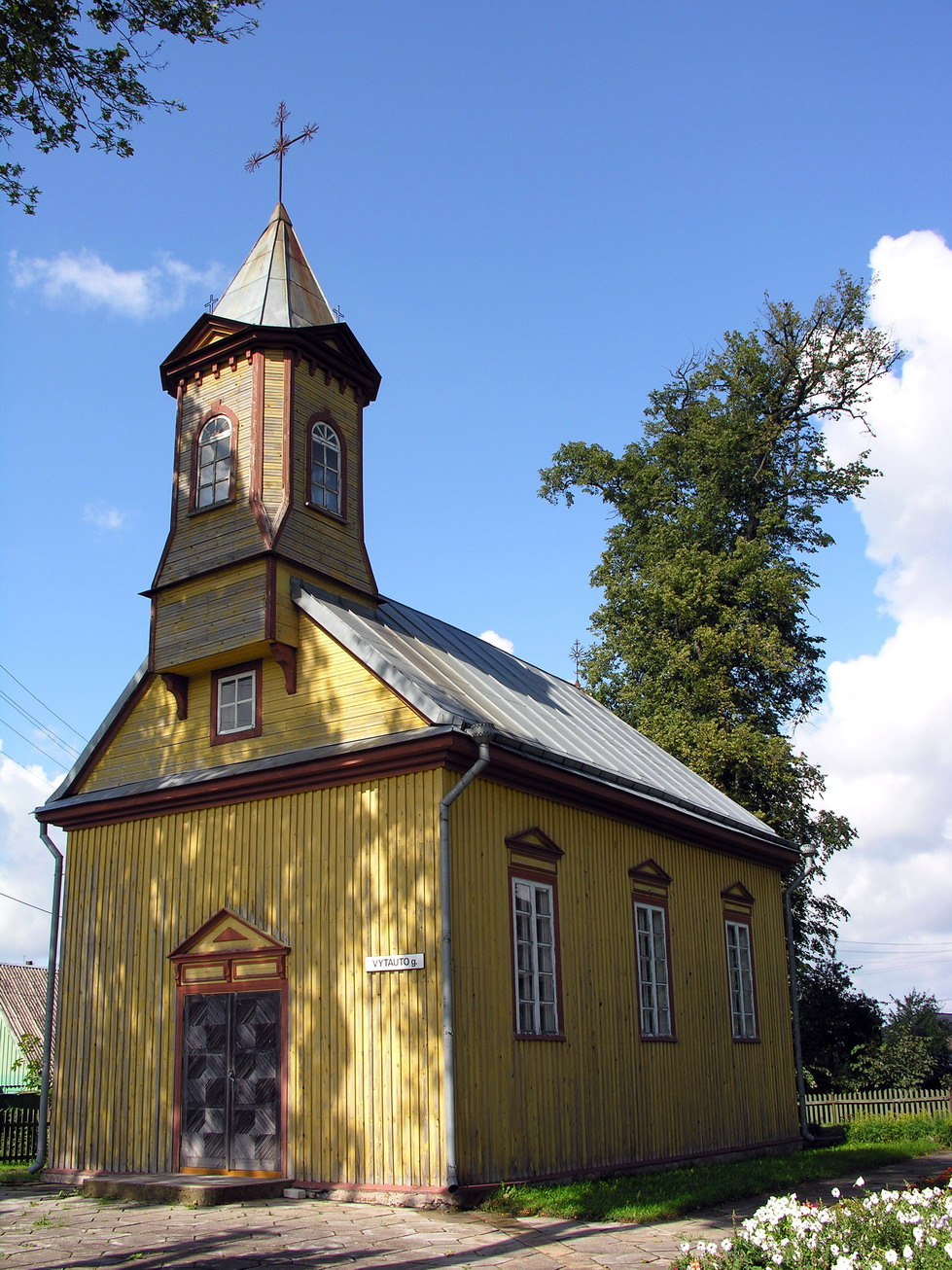
- Church of St. John of Nepomuk

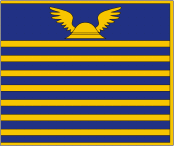
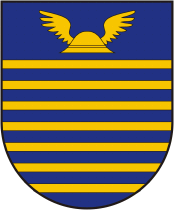
- Flag Coat of arms

- Location of Seda
- Coordinates: 56°10′0″N 22°5′0″E
- Country: Lithuania
- Ethnographic region: Samogitia
- County: Telšiai County
- Municipality: Mažeikiai district municipality
- Eldership: Seda eldership
- Capital of: Seda eldership
- First mentioned: 13th century
- Granted city rights: 1780

Population (2022)
  - Total: 898
- Time zone: UTC+2 (EET)
  - Summer (DST): UTC+3 (EEST)

Seda is a city in Mažeikiai district municipality, Lithuania. It is 24 km (15 mi) south-west of Mažeikiai on the Varduva River. There are two churches in the town.

== History ==
According to Kazimieras Būga, the name of Seda is of hydronymic origin and was derived from the name of nearby Lake Seda also known as Sedula. Seda was first mentioned in written sources in the 13th century. From the 15th century Seda was famous as a busy trade settlement with Livonia. The town of Seda was established in 1500 and in 1508 the parish was founded. In the middle of 17th century, Seda suffered great losses during the Deluge, but recovered in the 18th century. In 1770, ciwun Vaclovas Bartoškevičius and his wife Elžbieta Juškaitėthe sponsored construction of the Catholic Church of the Assumption. The town belonged to the Sapieha family, but their possessions were confiscated by the authorities of the Russian Empire for their participation the November Uprising of 1831. Town residents also were active in January Uprising of 1863 and book smuggling during the Lithuanian press ban. Poet and bishop Antanas Baranauskas worked in the town in 1855. The central town square is named in his honor and the monument was erected in 2000. In 1886, the western part of the town burnt down.

During World War II, the town was under Soviet occupation from 1940, and then under German occupation from 1941 to 1944. From June to July 1941, from 10 to 150 Jews of the village were murdered in mass executions perpetrated by an Einsatzgruppe of local Lithuanians. A stele is erected on the site of the massacre. On October 6–7, 1944, a battle took place between the Lithuanian Homeland Defense Detachment (Tevynės apsaugos rinktinė) and the Russian Red Army. Commemorating the 50th anniversary of the battle, a monument was erected to the fallen soldiers in the square near the Church of the Assumption. In 1950 Seda was granted town rights. On July 16, 2004, the coat of arms of Seda town was approved by the presidential decree. Seda belonged to Žemaičiai military district of Lithuanian partisans.

== Religion ==
Seda, like almost all Lithuania, is a Catholic village. There are two wooden churches in Seda. One of them is the Church of the Assumption which was first built in 1508. The Baroque church has several objects included in the Lithuanian heritage list – two bells, four ornamented crosses, fourteen Stations of the Cross, five altars, double-sided paintings Christ between instruments of torture and Pietà, three other paintings. The second church is the church of Saint John of Nepomuk which was consecrated in 1793. Before the Holocaust, the town also had a Jewish synagogue, first mentioned in 1657. The wooden building survived World War II and was re-purposed as living quarters and school gym before collapsing in 2005.

== Education ==
Seda has a secondary school (gymnasium), which has approximately 500 students and 40 teachers. The gymnasium's students have two kinds of uniforms. One for holidays and special occasions, which consists of a white blouse, a black jacket with the emblem of their school, and a plaited skirt. On regular days, the students wear a white shirt and a black jacket with the emblem.

History of the school in Seda:

- 1538 - A parish school was established in Seda.
- 1803 - Russian school was opened.
- 1865 - A department for girls was set up.
- 1903 - A school for girls was opened.
- 1915 - Both Russian schools were closed because of the World War I.
- 1921 - A secondary school was opened in Seda.
- 1935 - Secondary school was closed.
- 1939 - A secondary school was opened with two sections.
- 1947 - The first graduated students of the school after the World War II.
- 1961 - School moves to the current premises.
- 2001 - LV of graduated students was released after the war.
- 2004 - School was named after Vytautas Mačernis.
- 2007 - Seda Vytautas Mačernis School became a gymnasium.
