= Varduva =

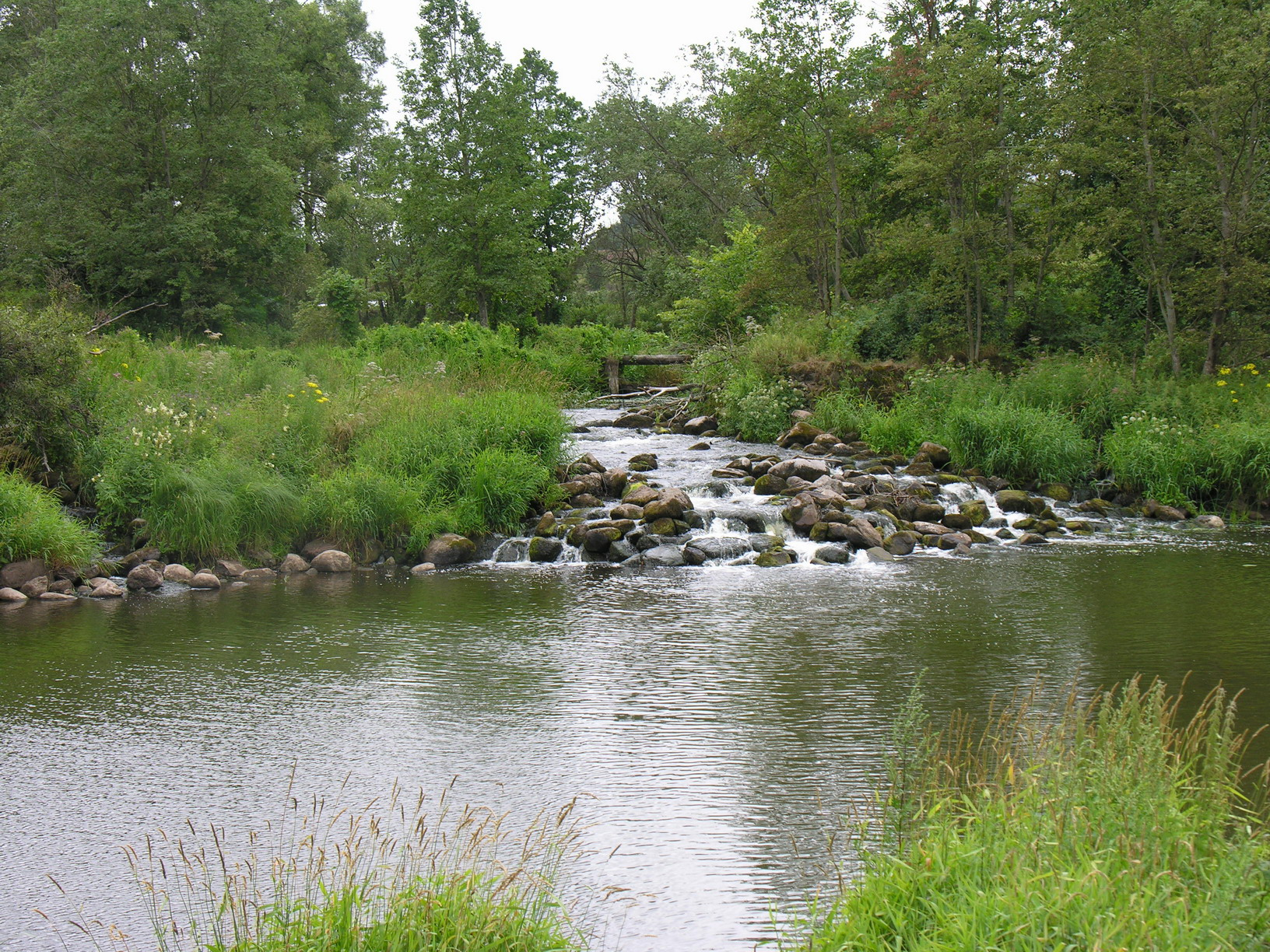
- Varduva near Griežė, Mažeikiai District Municipality

Location
- Country: Lithuania

Physical characteristics
- Source
  - location: Near Paparčiai village, Skuodas District Municipality
  - coordinates: 56°9′29″N 21°55′4″E
- Mouth
  - location: Venta
  - coordinates: 56°25′26.75″N 22°12′29.76″E
- Length: 90.3 km (56.1 mi)
- Basin size: 586.7 km^{2} (226.5 sq mi)

Varduva is a river in northwestern Lithuania. Its length is 90.3 kilometres (56.1 mi). It is a left tributary of Venta; their confluence is on the Lithuania–Latvia border. Its origins and upper reaches are located within the Žemaitija National Park. Its largest tributary is Sruoja. Larger settlements situated near Varduva include Žemaičių Kalvarija, Seda, Renavas, Ukrinai. Varduva has five small hydroelectric power plants: Kulšėnai, Ukrinai, Vadagiai, Juodeikiai, Renavas. The largest of these plants in Juodeikiai produced 2.99 GWh of electricity in 2010.
