= Professors Zwillinge in Italien =

Professor’s Twins in Italy
- Author: Else Ury
- Original title: Professors Zwillinge in Italien
- Translator: Steven Lehrer
- Illustrator: Robert Sedlacek
- Language: English
- Series: Professors Twins, volume 3
- Genre: Fiction/Adventure
- Publisher: SF Tafel
- Publication date: 2024
- Publication place: Germany
- Media type: Paperback
- Pages: 246 pp
- ISBN: 9798872711674
- Preceded by: Professors Zwillinge in der Waldschule
- Followed by: Professors Zwillinge im Sternenhaus

Herbert and Suse, affectionately known as “Bubi” and “Mädi”, are the heroes of the five-volume series Professor’s Twins by Else Ury. Their father, Professor Winter, an astronomer, was transferred to Naples and after a year of separation the family reunites under the southern sun in volume 3, Professor’s Twins in Italy, the most popular volume, published 1927. Bubi and Mädi quickly adapt to their new surroundings, learn the language and attend school separately for the first time.

== Plot summary ==
"Original Dust Jacket, Professors Zwillinge in Italien. Illustration by Robert Sedlacek

This is a story set in Naples, Italy. The family, including Professor Winter, is reunited at the Central Station in Naples after being apart for a year. Professor Winter was more likely a postdoctoral fellow than a professor. If he were an actual professor, he would be a civil servant and have a job, but he is still too young. His contract probably expired and now he has another postdoc position abroad, in Italy, from where he can apply for a regular professorship in Germany.

Herbert, the son, had wandered off to the police but was found and brought back by his family. The story touches on the excitement and challenges of the reunion, with Vesuvius in the background, emitting a black cloud of smoke. Next morning, the twins, Herbert and Suse, wake up in a new place (Italy) and struggle to adapt to their surroundings. They discover they are in Italy with their father. The unfamiliar environment includes a glass door leading to a terrace, different morning routines, and the sounds of Italian street vendors. The family discusses the cultural differences, such as the mosquito nets, stone floors, and the practice of shouting newspaper headlines in the morning. The father introduces the children to Italian breakfast, and they express their preferences. Later, the family goes on a sightseeing tour in Naples, experiencing the bustling streets, meeting local vendors, and observing various aspects of Neapolitan life. The chapter concludes with the family enjoying a meal at a restaurant, where the twins make amusing choices from the Italian menu, and Suse falls asleep in a charming setting, akin to Sleeping Beauty, eventually being awakened by their dog, Bubi. The story follows Herbert and his family's visit to the harbor in Naples. Herbert is captivated by the ships and expresses a desire to climb the lighthouse, but his father declines. The family takes a boat tour, exploring the bustling harbor with its diverse population. They encounter sailors from various races and nationalities. Eventually, they visit a German steamer and a Japanese ship. The family's excitement is palpable as they explore the large ship, envisioning faraway travels. Despite the missed opportunity to climb the lighthouse and Herbert's whimsical wish to sail to America, the family reflects on their adventurous day in Naples. The narrative shifts to the Professor's Twins learning Italian before starting school in Italy. They receive daily lessons from a teacher, Dottore Salvani, and interact with Pietro and Teresina. Suse befriends Pietro due to her love for flowers, while Herbert engages in activities with Bubi, the family dog. The twins have their first Italian lesson, marked by laughter and playful interactions with their new teacher. The story highlights their cultural immersion and the challenges of learning a new language, adding a touch of humor to the learning process. The twins eagerly await Sundays, anticipating family time with their father. They often pick him up from the observatory atop Capo di Monte, enjoying the beautiful scenery of Naples. The children play "Sky Hopping" and urge their father to take them to the castle park, but he suggests an excursion to Pozzuoli and Cape Misenum. The family spends a delightful Sunday exploring, swimming, and making a special find in the sea. Herbert, wishing for rain, befriends Italian children in a Naples park. He learns Italian through play, makes friends with a newsboy named Arminio, and trades airplane play for selling newspapers. However, Herbert's impromptu venture causes worry when he goes missing, leading to a search by his mother and sister. During an Italian class, twins Herbert and Suse are distracted by the anticipation of rain, breaking the Italian-only rule. As a storm approaches, an earthquake hits, causing chaos. The family evacuates the house, and after the quake, they find comfort in each other's presence. The family visits the Naples aquarium, exploring marine and reptilian wonders. Suse falls ill, but after recovering, the family shares joyful moments, fostering a love for exploration and family bonds. The narrative weaves themes of curiosity, resilience, and the beauty of the natural world. The Professor's family embarks on a journey from Naples to Capri. The ship's voyage offers scenic views, encounters with monks, and a sense of excitement for the twins. In Sorrento, they explore the landscape, meet a dwarf named Tonino, and learn about the local craftsmanship. The family's arrival in Capri marks the beginning of their adventures, with the promise of more discoveries, including a visit to the Blue Grotto (Capri). The family experiences life on Capri, enjoying the beach, making friends, and anticipating a visit to the Blue Grotto. When they finally venture into the grotto, there are moments of awe and amusement, but also some challenges, especially with the presence of the family dog, Bubi. Despite the ups and downs, the family cherishes their time in Capri, with more adventures yet to unfold. Professor Winter's son, Herbert, disobeys his father's instructions not to visit the Blue Grotto, leading to a series of events. Despite promising to improve, Herbert becomes fixated on the Wonderful Grotto, planning to secretly visit it with a friend named Bernardo. He deceives his twin sister, Suse, and feels guilty about his disobedience. The narrative explores Herbert's internal conflict between his desire for adventure and the consequences of his actions. The twins return to Naples and express excitement about an upcoming trip to Mount Vesuvius. Despite Suse's fear, their father decides to take them to the volcano. The family meets Vesuvius children, Rita and Enrico, at the observatory. Rita befriends Suse and helps her overcome her fear. Meanwhile, the professor and the observatory director discuss volcanic phenomena. The visit turns into a memorable adventure, and the twins return to Germany with fond memories of their time near Vesuvius. The narrative follows the adventures of Professor Winter's twins, Suse and Herbert, as they navigate the challenges of attending separate schools in Naples, Italy. Suse faces anxiety during an entrance exam at the girls' lyceum, but with the support of a sympathetic teacher, she overcomes her fears and excels in the subjects. On the other hand, Herbert, attending the boys' gymnasium, finds the academic demands more challenging than expected and encounters disciplinary differences that make him question his choice. The story also highlights the twins' adjustment to the Italian school system, their contrasting experiences, and the unexpected twists in their educational paths. Eventually, Suse's determination and Herbert's realization lead them to attend the same lyceum, bringing a sense of happiness and unity. The narrative shifts to the Christmas season in Naples. The absence of familiar Christmas traditions, such as snow and Christmas trees, poses a challenge for the twins. Despite the absence of a Christmas tree, Suse and Herbert decide to surprise their parents by learning to play "Silent Night, Holy Night" on the piano. The story unfolds with their efforts to keep this a secret, their struggles to acquire a Christmas tree, and the thoughtful gift exchange between the siblings. The twins, Suse and Herbert, reminisce about previous Christmases and express disappointment over not having a Christmas tree this year. Feeling the need to spread joy, they decide to give gifts to the poor beggars in the Villa Nazionale. Their compassionate gesture is well-received, and the grateful beggars bless them. Later, on Christmas Eve, the family is surprised with a beautifully adorned cypress tree and the arrival of friends, including Rita and her brother Enrico. The twins play a German Christmas carol on the piano, and everyone exchanges thoughtful gifts. The joy of Christmas is enhanced by the unexpected arrival of Uncle Ernst, who brings greetings and gifts from home. The story transitions to the new year, with Uncle Ernst staying with the family in Naples. Professor Winter's frequent professional trips to Rome create an opportunity for the family to explore Pompeii with Uncle Ernst, who is an archaeologist. Despite initial reluctance, the twins find aspects of Pompeii intriguing, especially the plaster casts of victims from the Vesuvius eruption. Suse is moved to tears by a small child's cast. The family explores various artifacts, and Uncle Ernst provides historical insights. The visit ends with a humorous moment as Herbert expresses hunger and excitement about finding a tavern, only to discover that it's now a set of stone serving tables. The twins have mixed feelings about Pompeii, with Suse finding the experience unsettling and Herbert preferring modern Berlin. The twins, Herbert and Suse, have adjusted well to their new life, excelling in school and learning Italian. They attend the opera with their family, where an incident involving a Gypsy creates a disruption. Meanwhile, Uncle Ernst, who had spent the winter with the family, is returning to Germany. The professor is faced with a decision regarding an invitation to the Vatican Observatory in Rome. As Easter approaches, the family considers the possibility of moving to Rome, but the professor receives a letter from Jena offering him the position of director of the new Zeiss-Planetarium Jena. This revelation brings excitement and joy, and the family decides to return to Germany. The book ends with their departure from Naples, heading north with their pets, Bubi and Piccola, towards their German homeland.

== Background ==
Twin pairs had always fascinated Else Ury. Same-sex twins had already appeared as Nesthäkchen's Brazilian grandchildren in Volume 9, Nesthäkchen and Her Grandchildren. Usually, the children are different in character and temperament, and Else Ury uses the duplication for various mix-up anecdotes. But not Professor Winter's twins. Here, it's a girl and a boy. The girl is always the shy, fearful, obedient one, and the boy is the brave, clever, abstract-thinking little explorer. In volume 2, Professors Zwillinge in der Waldschule, they attend the "Waldschule" (Forest School), a modern institution where boys and girls are taught together. This school really existed in Berlin. In 1925, it was a rare form of school with exceptionally progressive pedagogy. Founded in 1904 as a reform pedagogical project for children in need of recreation in Charlottenburg, it was established as a high school during the summer months from 1919 and as a year-round day school for both genders from 1923. Classes often took place outdoors, and the children were encouraged to explore nature. As for the twins, Professor Winter receives a scientific assignment at the observatory in Naples, and the family moves to Italy for a year. It is unclear whether working on this volume inspired Else Ury to go to Italy herself or if her own trip had inspired the book. In 1927, Professor's Twins in Italy was published by Meidingers Jugendschriften Verlag. Traveling to Italy had been popular in German bourgeois education since Goethe. People traveled with Goethe's Italian Journey and the art history of Johann Joachim Winckelmann, narrowing their focus to seemingly timeless cultural monuments. The Italy of 1927, marked by post-war chaos, where Mussolini had come to power and persecuted and expelled any opposition, is not in this story. In the Ury family album, there is a postcard photograph. It shows Else and her brother Hans Ury with radiant happy faces on St. Mark's Square in Venice, surrounded by pigeons. Else Ury writes, "The bridal couple sends warm regards from Venice."
