= Nesthäkchen =

Television series

- Starring: Doris Kunstmann; Christian Wolff; Susanne Uhlen; Kathrin Toboll
- Country of origin: Germany

Nesthäkchen is a German television series directed by Gero Erhardt, which was broadcast as the fifth Christmas series of the ZDF 1983. It is based on Else Ury's novels Nesthäkchen and Her Dolls (1913), Nesthäkchen's First School Year (1915), and Nesthäkchen in the Children's Sanitorium (1915/1921). The story revolves around Annemarie Braun, who is called Nesthäkchen, the youngest child of a doctor's family. Annemarie grows up with her brothers Hans and Klaus in Berlin during the imperial era shortly before the First World War.

== Story ==
Nesthäkchen (Kathrin Toboll) and her family from the 1983 ZDF series

The television series starts in Berlin in the early 20th century. Dr. Ernst Braun is a respected doctor. He and his wife Elsbeth have a Prussian marriage and educate their children in the virtues of the imperial era. Annemarie is the youngest of the three children (two older sons) and is the darling of the father, who is quite caring. The family lives in a spacious apartment in Charlottenburg. Charlottenburg Palace forms the title motif of the opening credits. Other family members are the grandma, the nanny Lena, and household servants.

Annemarie has a happy childhood with all the benefits of the upper middle class. She has many dolls, and her father lets her frequently misbehave. For example, she often uses the swear word "Donnerknispel" without being scolded. One day, when she throws her father's new barometer off the wall, her father forgives her; instead of punishing her, he explains to Annemarie how the instrument works. A holiday with her uncle Heinrich and Aunt Käthe on a farm in Bavaria is also portrayed. Afterwards, the rural influence on the children is obvious. Mother soon restores proper behavior. Annemarie's friend and nanny Lena sleeps in Annemarie's room. After Annemarie disobediently walks on the street with other children and even gets into trouble in a simple Berlin backyard, Lena recommends sending Annemarie to a kindergarten. In kindergarten, Annemarie is the smartest of the children, who all come from upscale homes. Later, at grade school, Annemarie is the best pupil, which especially pleases her father. Her report card prompts her father to praise her.

In her schooldays Annemarie gets scarlet fever and travels to Amrum for a cure in a children's sanitorium. There she experiences adventures with the dangerous Wadden Sea and the kind-hearted sanitorium director Mrs. Clarsen, a captain's widow. During Annemarie's stay, the First World War breaks out, and she returns to Berlin with great difficulty. A happy reunion ensues, but the advent of the World War has a tragic effect on the family: The older brother wants to volunteer for the navy. Dr Braun wears the field-gray coat of a medical officer under his doctor's white coat.

The story continues in Ury's books, which recount almost all of Annemarie's life: her teenage years, her university studies, her marriage, and even her first great-grandchild.

== Production ==
- Annemarie is portrayed by two young actresses to indicate aging. The actors playing brothers Klaus and Hans and school friend Margot also are played by two actors or actresses.
- The six episodes of the ZDF Christmas program (1983) had twelve million viewers.
- Nesthäkchen was the first directorial work of Gero Erhardt, son of Heinz Erhardt.
- The series was elaborately produced with many outdoor shots and extras, all of which had to be adapted to the time.

== Video Release ==
The series has been released on VHS and DVD. In January and May 2005 DVDs were released with three episodes. In October 2009 a new edition of the DVDs, a complete boxed set, contained all six episodes.

== See also ==
- List of German television series
