= Karl Ludwig Schröder =

- Born: 30 July 1877; Zerbst, Germany
- Died: 23 September 1940 (aged 63); Rome, Italy
- Occupations: screenwriter, director, agent
- Spouse: Irma Schröder

Karl Ludwig Schröder (1877-1940) was a screenwriter, director, and agent known for engaging noted authors as scenarists.

== Stage career ==
Schröder was Dramaturg and director in 1904 of the United Municipal Theaters in Cologne, in 1905 at the Volksoper Wien, 1906 at the Municipal Theatre Glogau, 1908-1909 Deputy Director, director and dramaturg at the Deutsches Theater in Hannover, 1910-1912 executive director of the Koblenz City Theater. Schröder was a journalist, editor of Dramaturgische Blatter in 1905 and co-editor of the German theater magazine (1908–11), secretary 1911/12 and treasurer of the Association of Rhenish-Westphalian Theater Directors.

== Film career ==
The film medium had in its early years a somewhat tarnished reputation. It was regarded as reckless, vulgar, and titillating. In the 1910s a number of filmmakers tried to lift the medium to a more artistic level. Schröder was in the period 1912 - 1914 head of Nordisk Film Company's branch in Berlin. In this position he was the first to use acclaimed writers as screenwriters and scenarists for film. He called them Autorenfilm. The first such film was the Danish silent film Atlantis (1913 film), which was based on a book of the same name by the German writer Gerhart Hauptmann, who had received the Nobel Prize in Literature (1912). Schröder collaborated with Arthur Schnitzler in early efforts to transfer Schnitzler's play Liebelei to film, Liebelei (film).

== Agent ==
In 1939, Schröder represented German-Jewish children's writer Else Ury in a failed attempt to sell her books to Hollywood. Ury's situation in Germany had become untenable, and she had no hope that it would improve. Early that year she tried to market her work in England and the US, aspiring to establish an economic basis for emigration. She sent her stories to acquaintances in London, among them her 20 year old nephew Klaus Heymann, who had immigrated to England because he was not allowed to study in Germany. But Klaus knew no one capable of making a literary English translation of her work. More promising was her contact with nephew Fritz, who had immigrated to England and was acquainted with Schröder, who was working as a literary and film agent in Berlin. Schröder, in turn, was in contact with the Hollywood agent Paul Kohner, and knew that Hollywood was looking for material for its child stars. In a letter to Kohner, 10 March 1939, Schröder refers to Else Ury: “If a company in the USA has a child film star, I will make them aware of the non-aryan German writer Else Ury (millions of copies in print), whom I represent. I can send copies of her books from Berlin if they are not available. Her works have not been translated into English, although there are French, Dutch, and Norwegian editions.” Kohner answered: “Material for child stars is of extraordinary interest. I ask you to send me as soon as possible any of Else Ury’s books that might lend themselves to filming.” Schröder's German-Jewish wife had immigrated to Rome, and Schröder was back and forth between Rome and Berlin. He wrote to Kohner, referring to his Berlin address, “because of the mail censor, please only write in terms that cannot be misunderstood.” In his next letter Schöder promised, “I write again about Else Ury and her children’s books. I will immediately send you a selection of them if they can still be posted from Germany…I must say again that these books, published in the millions, are appropriate for children of all ages. For Shirley Temple Ury’s books would be just as good as the Swiss book Heidi." Kohner, who received this letter 2 June 1939, responded immediately, “We are awaiting your report here…But if you think that a book by Ury would be equally appropriate for Shirley Temple as Heidi, you’re not acquainted with the fact that Heidi is a hugely successful and famous book in America.” Apparently in July 1939 (the letter is undated) Else Ury herself wrote to Kohner. She gave her address as “Solinger Straße 87, z.Zt. Krummhübel, Riesengebirge, Haus Nesthäkchen.” Ury indicated that she had included volume 4, Nesthäkchen and the World War, and she described in general terms the contents of the other volumes. Ury suggested that the lead role in volume 6, Nesthäkchen Flies From the Nest, could be played by a big girl; a child star could take the role of Nesthäkchen's daughter in volume 7, Nesthäkchen and Her Chicks. Ury briefly mentions that the later volumes 8-10 could serve as a conclusion for the film or the beginning of part two. She also suggested her book Baumeisters Rangen that, in her opinion, would make a good film story. She promised to send the books to Kohner's agency and gave the address of her brother Ludwig as her business correspondent. Kohner answered 2 August 1939: “Dear Madam, I have your undated letter from last month, and I understand that Herr Karl L. Schröder will send me a number of your children’s books. As soon as I receive them I will have synopses prepared. You will have further information from me either at your address or the address of your brother. In the meantime I send you warm greetings. (Paul Kohner).” The outbreak of World War II, 1 September 1939, ended all Ury's contacts and hopes. In Kohner's files there is no further reference to Else Ury. Nor did she correspond again with Karl L. Schröder, who died in Rome, 23 September 1940. Ury's brief dream of Hollywood had evaporated.
