= Nesthäkchen's Youngest =

1924 book by Else Ury

Nesthäkchen’s Youngest
- Author: Else Ury
- Original title: Nesthäkchens Jüngste
- Illustrator: Robert Sedlacek
- Language: German
- Series: Nesthäkchen, volume 8
- Genre: Fiction/Adventure
- Publisher: Meidingers Jugendschriften Verlag
- Publication date: 1924
- Publication place: Germany
- Media type: Print (Hardcover)
- Pages: 191 pp (Hardcover edition)
- Preceded by: Nesthäkchen and Her Chicks
- Followed by: Nesthäkchen and Her Grandchildren

Nesthäkchens Jüngste (English: Nesthäkchen's Youngest) is the eighth volume of the ten-book Nesthäkchen series by Else Ury. This volume was published in 1924. Nesthäkchen is Annemarie Braun, a Berlin doctor's daughter, a slim, golden blond, quintessential German girl. The series follows Annemarie from infancy (Nesthäkchen and Her Dolls) to old age and grandchildren (Nesthäkchen with White Hair). Nesthäkchens Jüngste describes Anne Marie's life as her youngest child, Ursel, grows up and marries.

== Plot summary ==
The volume begins in 1945; being published in 1924, World War II never occurred in the book's universe. Since the previous volume, 15 years have passed. Annemarie's physician husband Rudolf is now Privy Counsel and Professor. Daughter Vronli, serious, sensible, hard-working and humble, is a maternity nurse in Munich. Brother Hans’ son, a poor student, is about to graduate and does not want to study medicine, contrary to the wishes of his father, but wants to be a farmer like his admired Uncle Klaus. The main character is the youngest daughter, Ursel, seventeen, who has just graduated from school and is very similar to Annemarie.

Ursel has a beautiful voice and wants to be a singer, but her father insists that she start as a bank clerk. The difficult situation between father and daughter escalates angrily for a time, but Annemarie smooths the waves and devises a compromise: Ursel joins the bank, but takes singing lessons from an aging opera diva.

Annemarie's brother Klaus is married to Ilse and has four sons, while Marlene and Peter are parents of three daughters. Brother Hans is lonely since the death of his wife Ola, and has two wild sons. Annemarie's girlfriend Margot is his housekeeper and a little later his second wife.

Annemarie's mother is widowed and considerably aged by grief. Since her apartment is too big for her and old Hanne, her cook, she takes in travelers, among them two rich Brazilian siblings, Milton and Margarida Tavares, children of a coffee plantation owner. The two meet Ursel and befriend her. Ursel and Milton fall in love, but Ursel fears leaving Germany.

She soon feels increasingly uncomfortable at the bank, and has a collision with her supervisor, much to the dismay of her parents. Everything eventually works out when her father's patient, music professor Lange, hears Ursel singing and asks Rudolf Hartenstein to let Ursel attend the Conservatory. When Ursel is allowed to substitute at a major concert for a singer who became ill, she seems to be at the beginning of a great career. Ultimately, she realizes that her love is stronger than her singing voice. She marries Milton Tavares and goes with him to Brazil.

Annemarie soldiers on despite her own pain at the separation. Numerous letters home describe Ursel's new life, and at the end of the story she becomes the mother of twins Anita and Marietta, each named after their grandmother Annemarie.

== Similarities to Der Trotzkopf ==
Nesthäkchen's Youngest shows substantive similarities with the earlier Der Trotzkopf series by of Emmy von Rhoden. As daughter Ruth is Mother Ilse's copy, Ursel is Annemarie's younger self. Like Ruth Gontrau, Ursel Hartenstein also dreams of a singing career. Even the emigration to America is in Der Trotzkopf. There, Margaret's daughter Marianne is engaged to Fritz, who has become a successful businessman in America, and goes with him to San Francisco. After many years of separation, their American children return to Germany.
