= Nesthäkchen With White Hair =

Nesthäkchen with White Hair
- Author: Else Ury
- Original title: Nesthäkchen im weißen Haar
- Illustrator: Robert Sedlacek
- Language: German
- Series: Nesthäkchen, volume 10
- Genre: Fiction/Adventure
- Publisher: Meidingers Jugendschriften Verlag
- Publication date: 1925
- Publication place: Germany
- Media type: Print (Hardcover)
- Pages: 191 pp (Hardcover edition)
- Preceded by: Nesthäkchen and Her Grandchildren

Else Ury's Nesthäkchen is a Berlin doctor's daughter, Annemarie Braun, a slim, golden blond, quintessential German girl. The ten book Nesthäkchen series follows Annemarie from infancy (Nesthäkchen and Her Dolls) to old age and grandchildren (Nesthäkchen with White Hair). Volume 10 (1925) describes the education, courtship and marriage of Annemarie’s granddaughter, Marietta, and Annemarie’s first great grandchild.

== Plot summary ==
The year is 1973. The twenty-six year old Marietta lives in Berlin with Grandparents Rudolf Hartenstein and Annemarie Braun Hartenstein. She works, as part of her studies, in a kindergarten, where she is a favorite "aunt." Together with cousin Gerda she attends a women's school in order to be a youth counselor, a popular profession in the nineteen-twenties for modern, socially engaged women. From her twin Anita she has grown more and more distant. She is smitten with Horst, son of her grand-uncle Klaus, but Horst is enamored of Anita, and travels to Brazil to be with her. Anita's family expects her to marry Horst, but she gets engaged, to everyone’s surprise, to Ricardo Orlando, the son of wealthy neighbors. One day Marietta notes a similarity between the kindergarten child Lenchen and Lotte, the foundling, who still lives in the Hartenstein house with the Kunzes, the household servants. It turns out that Lenchen’s grandmother was also Lotte's grandmother and Lenchen’s mother is Lotte's aunt. Lotte remains with the Kunzes, but is happy to have found her relatives and maintains contact with them. Marietta accompanies a group of children who travel to the seaside to relax. Lotte stays on the estate of her grand-uncle Klaus. Here she receives the news that her grandfather Rudolf is blind. Surgery restores his eyesight. Marietta travels with her grandparents to Italy and in Genoa visits relatives of her paternal grandmother. She meets Horst, who has returned from Brazil. The two grow closer. After a shared experience during an earthquake, Horst confesses his love to Marietta. The novel ends with Horst and Marietta's wedding and Annemarie and Rudolf's Golden Wedding Anniversary. The whole family assembles, and Anita brings her little daughter Rosita, Annemarie's first great-grandchild, to the celebration. In 1928, Ury revised and adapted a chapter ("The Radio") to reflect the modern technology.
