= Nesthäkchen and Her Chicks =

1923 book by Else Ury

- Author: Else Ury
- Original title: Nesthäkchen und ihre Küken
- Illustrator: Robert Sedlacek
- Language: German
- Series: Nesthäkchen, volume 7
- Genre: Fiction/Adventure
- Publisher: Meidingers Jugendschriften Verlag
- Publication date: 1923
- Publication place: Germany
- Media type: Print (Hardcover)
- Pages: 191 pp (Hardcover edition)
- Preceded by: Nesthäkchen Flies From the Nest
- Followed by: Nesthäkchen's Youngest

Nesthäkchen und ihre Küken (transl. Nesthäkchen and Her Chicks) is the seventh volume of the ten-book Nesthäkchen series by Else Ury. This volume was published in 1923. Nesthäkchen is Annemarie Braun, a Berlin doctor's daughter, a slim, golden blond, quintessential German girl. The series follows Annemarie from infancy (Nesthäkchen and Her Dolls) to old age and grandchildren (Nesthäkchen with White Hair). Nesthäkchen und ihre Küken describes Anne Marie's early years of motherhood.

In this novel the plot has advanced beyond the year during which Else Ury was writing, 1923. In order to continue the series, Else Ury extended the middle 1920s milieu of her fifth and sixth Nesthäkchen volumes for another half-century. Time stands still, but the characters age. Therefore, Annemarie's life no longer unfolds, as in the first six books, in an actual historical period.

== Plot summary ==
"Nesthäkchen and Her Chicks" begins with Anne Marie and Rudolf's seventh wedding anniversary in 1930. The two live in Berlin-Lichterfelde and now have three children: the six-year Vronli, the three-year-old Hans and two-year-old Ursel. Anne Marie's parents, "Omama" and "Opapa" are now beloved grandparents, her grandmother the "Urmütterchen" and Aunt Albertina the "Urtantchen" of Annemarie's children. Brother Hans is a magistrate married to Rudolf's sister Ola, with two sons, Herbert and Waldemar. Klaus is a farmer, still a bachelor, who is enamored with Annemarie's girlfriend Ilse Hermann. Ilse and Marlene Ulrich, the inseparable cousins, are teachers at a girls' school. Margot and Vera are unmarried and employed, Margot as head of a dressmaking firm and Vera as a photographer.

Anne Marie's daughter Vronli starts school. Hans and Ursel are alone in the house and find Father's matches. Hans starts a fire. The house burns down and the homeless family finds shelter with their neighbors, the lonely, old, but child-loving bachelor Mr. Pfefferkorn and his grumpy housekeeper Mrs. Luebke. Subsequently, Annemarie and the children move in with her parents. Financial worries torment Annemarie and Rudolf, and Annemarie has the desire to earn money to help her husband. She is unable to carry out this plan, in reference to the Hyperinflation in the Weimar Republic between June 1921 and January 1924.

In winter the children become seriously ill with the flu, but recover. "Urmütterchens" seventieth birthday is celebrated. "Urtantchen" dies soon afterward. In summer, Annemarie travels with her children, Ilse and Marlene, to visit her brother Klaus in the Pomeranian countryside. They live at his estate, Lüttgenheide, on the Baltic Sea, nearby Cousin Peter on Grotgenheide. The story ends with the betrothal of Klaus to Ilse and Peter to Marlene.

== Differences between editions ==
In the first editions of the book, Else Ury adds an epilogue in which she states that she hesitated to continue the Nesthäkchen series, but was finally moved to do so by the many letters of her young readers.

This volume was modernized after World War II. Originally Annemarie sometimes spanks her children, but does not do so in the post-war editions.
