= Nesthäkchen's Teenage Years =

Nesthäkchen’s Teenage Years
- Author: Else Ury
- Original title: Nesthäkchens Backfischzeit
- Translator: Steven Lehrer
- Illustrator: Robert Sedlacek
- Language: English
- Series: Nesthäkchen, volume 5
- Genre: Fiction/Adventure
- Publisher: SF Tafel
- Publication date: 2016
- Publication place: US
- Media type: Print
- Pages: 312 pp (Trade Paper edition)
- ISBN: 978-1523476800
- Preceded by: Nesthäkchen and the World War
- Followed by: Nesthäkchen Flies From the Nest

Else Ury's Nesthäkchen is a Berlin doctor's daughter, Annemarie Braun, a slim, golden blond, quintessential German girl. The ten book Nesthäkchen series follows Annemarie from infancy (Nesthäkchen and Her Dolls) to old age and grandchildren (Nesthäkchen with White Hair). Volume 5, Nesthäkchens Backfischzeit, (first published 1919) describes Annemarie's teenage years.

== Plot summary ==
The sweet toothed girls looked hungrily at the tempting tortes behind the window panes of the bakery, where they were shoveling. Illustration by Robert Sedlacek (1881–1957) from Nesthäkchen's Backfischzeit (1919).

This volume deals with Annemarie's youth during the period of economic and political turbulence following World War I, 1919–1922. Annemarie is almost 16 when the story begins, after the Armistice of 11 November 1918. She and her friends, Vera, Marlene, and Ilse, attend upper secondary school. When Annemarie feels wronged by their German teacher, she wants to set up a student council modeled on the Soviet Republic and argues with the director of the school. Her unruly behavior endangers her education, but she ultimately advances to her senior class.

Her 16th birthday party is disturbed by a general power cut and the economic blockade, which completely shuts down the electricity and telephone network. Annemarie visits her relatives on Arnsdorf Farm in Silesia (in the post 1945 editions Lower Bavaria). On her hasty return journey due to the occupation of Upper Silesia by Polish troops during the Polish–Czechoslovak War and first Silesian Uprising, she gets stuck in the town of Sagan due to a railway strike. (In the post 1945 editions Anne Marie has to leave Arnsdorf because of an upcoming general strike, and her train is stalled for lack of coal in Nuremberg.)

To earn money, she becomes a nanny for a doctor's family named Lange. The Langes soon realize that Annemarie is an educated girl from a good background, as she knows Latin, does not want to go on the street without a hat, is familiar with famous paintings and has a book by Selma Lagerlöf in her luggage. When Annemarie's identity is revealed, Dr. Lange turns out to be one of her father's Heidelberg University classmates, and the Langes treat her like a foster daughter until she leaves to return to Berlin. In winter 1919, there is a coal shortage and a violent wave of influenza. Annemarie tries to obtain coal for her family, but does not succeed. Finally, she gets sick.

Ury skips over 1920–1921.

The last chapter, "Examination Grades," concerns Annemarie's high school graduation in 1922. She and her friend Marlene have passed all written tests with A's and are exempted from the final oral examination.

== Critical reception ==
"In the course of her various adventures—with the Langes, in town, with a tyrannical teacher at school—Annemarie displays the winning blend of headstrong emotions, fiery temper, playful disposition, and precocious love of literature that made her such a favorite with German readers in the early years of the 20th century. That combination surfaces especially in this volume when Annemarie organizes a student council to redress perceived wrongs—with her in charge, of course. This book was originally published in 1919, when German morale was shattered and the nation’s economy in tatters. The story clearly pitches Annemarie’s ebullience as an antidote to those ills, a psychological dynamism captured without fuss or archness by Lehrer. He smoothly handles the novel’s many social and literary allusions; his annotations remain unobtrusively helpful; and his translation of the text itself effectively conveys Ury’s affectionate, often tongue-in-cheek estimations of her own famous main character. The tale’s simple, hearty optimism reverberates not only in Lehrer’s translation, but also in the half-dozen charming period illustrations he reproduces. A heartwarming, old-fashioned Young Adult classic, set in the early 20th century, that also serves as a snapshot of a Germany in turmoil." Kirkus Reviews
