= Nesthäkchen and Her Grandchildren =

1924 book by Else Ury

- Author: Else Ury
- Original title: Nesthäkchen und Ihre Enkel
- Illustrator: Robert Sedlacek
- Language: German
- Series: Nesthäkchen, volume 9
- Genre: Fiction/Adventure
- Publisher: Meidingers Jugendschriften Verlag
- Publication date: 1924
- Publication place: Germany
- Media type: Print (Hardcover)
- Pages: 191 pp (Hardcover edition)
- Preceded by: Nesthäkchen's Youngest
- Followed by: Nesthäkchen With White Hair

Else Ury's Nesthäkchen is a Berlin doctor's daughter, Annemarie Braun, a slim, golden blond, quintessential German girl. The ten book Nesthäkchen series follows Annemarie from infancy (Nesthäkchen and Her Dolls) to old age and grandchildren (Nesthäkchen with White Hair). Volume 9 (1924) describes Anne Marie's life as her youngest child, Ursel, Ursel's husband and children, return to Germany after 16 years in Brazil.

== Plot summary ==
It is 1961. Sixteen years have passed since Ursel's wedding, and she has not seen her family in Germany. Ursel lives with her husband, Milton Tavares, her fourteen year old, very different twins Anita and Marietta, and her little son, Juan (Hans), in São Paulo. The rich family has a luxurious existence, but Ursel works to improve the lot of the exploited plantation laborers. Marietta wants to emulate her mother, while the spoiled Anita thinks only of herself. One day Marietta gets lost on a neighboring plantation and finds a little German girl, Lotte Müller, whose mother is in a mud hut dying. The orphaned Lotte is adopted by the Tavares family and taken on their long-planned trip to Germany to find the mother's relatives. Annemarie suffers severely during the extended separation from her youngest, Ursel. She has become the most beloved "Omama" of Vronli's daughter, Gerda, and of Hans' children Lilli, Eva, Ned (presumably named after Annemarie's father, who is originally Edmund and called Ned by his wife) and Heinz. Annemarie's brother Hans has died. His second wife Margot and his two sons Herbert and Waldemar have disappeared from the story. When Anita and Marietta arrive in Germany, they have problems, because the two rich girls find it difficult to get used to the simple life, and do not want to help Rudolf and Annemarie with housework. However, the modest Marietta soon adapts, as she distances herself from her dominant twin sister. Little Lotte lives in the Hartenstein house with the servant couple Kunze; she is a replacement for their daughter. Her relatives – originally from Silesia, after 1945 from Westphalia—cannot be found. A dramatic turn occurs when Rudolf suffers a heart attack and is afraid to die without having seen Ursel again. Secretly, Marietta sends a telegram to her mother and tells her of the illness of her father. One day, Ursel appears unannounced at the door with the small Juan. Her husband arrives soon after. At the end, fifteen year old Marietta decides to stay in Germany with Rudolf and Annemarie.
