= Explorers of the Body =

1979 book by Steven Lehrer

- First edition
- Author: Steven Lehrer
- Original title: Explorers of the Body
- Language: English
- Genre: Nonfiction/History
- Publisher: Doubleday
- Publication date: 1979
- Publication place: United States
- Media type: Print (Hardcover)
- Pages: 494 pp (Hardcover edition)
- ISBN: 0595407315 (Trade paperback edition)
- Preceded by: Alternative Treatments for Cancer
- Followed by: Understanding Lung Sounds

Explorers of the Body is a book by Steven Lehrer that tells the story of epochal medical discoveries which have profoundly affected human health, and the men and women who made them. From the ancient Egyptians and Babylonians to modern medical science, the book covers the gamut of medical advances, among them:

- Edward Jenner and smallpox vaccination
- Gregor Mendel and genetics
- Marie Curie and radioactivity
- Jonas Salk and the polio vaccine
- William Harvey and the circulation of the blood
- Louis Pasteur and rabies vaccination
- Joseph Lister and the rise of modern surgery

== Critical reception ==
- "It is healthy to have this readable antidote to the medical profession's sanitized portraits of itself...much fascinating information."
- "Lots of good medical lore —and juicy."
- "The author has accomplished a tour de force."
- "An engrossing account of the medical milestones upon which 20th Century medicine is based."
- "Factual accounts often stranger and more dramatic than fiction…Among the many lively anecdotes is the story of the unusual collaboration between bacteriologist-writer Paul de Kruif and Sinclair Lewis, which produced the latter's prize-winning novel Arrowsmith.”
- "Here, at last, is a history of the great medical discoveries written by an author who refused to wear blinders...Explorers of the Body is a collection of many marvels."
- "An impressive, wide ranging assortment in the 494 pages, everything from the discovery of blood circulation to the development of the polio vaccine. Many of these discoveries have been the subjects of whole books, but Lehrer covers the high points well."
- "A sound and readable look at the 'intriguing, sometimes bizarre personalities who have prospered at the frontiers of medicine.'"
- "Here are the great breakthroughs in humanity's struggle to understand the body, told in an anecdotal style easy to follow and digest."

== Interviews ==
Lehrer was interviewed on the History Channel series Mavericks, Miracles, and Medicine (2003) about Explorers of the Body, as well as on the BBC series Medical Mavericks, Episode 4, Beating Infection.
