= Nesthäkchen and the World War =

Book by Else Ury

- Author: Else Ury
- Original title: Nesthäkchen und der Weltkrieg
- Translator: Steven Lehrer
- Illustrator: Robert Sedlacek
- Language: English
- Series: Nesthäkchen, volume 4
- Genre: Fiction/Adventure
- Publisher: SF Tafel
- Publication date: 2006
- Publication place: Germany
- Media type: Print (Trade Paper)
- Pages: 180 pp (Trade Paper edition)
- Preceded by: Nesthäkchen in the Children's Sanitorium
- Followed by: Nesthäkchen's Teenage Years

Else Ury's Nesthäkchen is a Berlin doctor's daughter, Anne Marie Braun, a slim, golden blond, quintessential German girl. The ten-book Nesthäkchen series follows Annemarie from infancy (Nesthäkchen and Her Dolls) to old age and grandchildren (Nesthäkchen with White Hair). Volume 4 describes Anne Marie's experiences in World War I from 1914 to 1916.

== Plot summary ==
"Original Dust Jacket, Nesthäkchen und der Weltkrieg. Illustration by Robert Sedlacek

Anne Marie's father, Dr. Braun, is a soldier and medical officer in France. Her mother is absent. Mrs. Braun was in England at the outbreak of war, visiting with her cousin Annie, who is married to an Englishman. Mrs. Braun can not go back to Germany because she missed her last opportunity for departure. Of her letters, only some get to her family. During the absence of the parents, the grandmother, the nanny Lena, and the cook Hanne care for Annemarie and her brothers. In England, Mrs. Braun is arrested as an alleged spy, after she has spoken, imprudently excited, about the success of German submarines. She is released soon afterwards. Anne Marie's brother Hans brings a foundling home. The baby, an East Prussian refugee, would likely have perished. Annemarie takes the child into the house enthusiastically and gives him the name “Hindenburg” for Paul von Hindenburg. Finally, the noisy child is passed to the concierge couple and given the name Max. Annemarie’s patriotism goes so far that a "foreign concept checkout" is set up at home and in class. Anyone who uses a foreign word must pay five cents. In Anne Marie's class a new girl, Vera Burkhard, arrives from Czernowitz in Bukovina. Vera hardly speaks German. Spurred on by two older girls, Anne Marie holds Vera for a Polish spy, therefore an enemy, and begins to bully the girl. Anne Marie’s girlfriends Margot, Ilse and Marlene have compassion for Vera, but dare not oppose the dominant Anne Marie. Occasionally Anne Marie has doubts about the correctness of her behavior, but she does not want to admit she is wrong. Finally, the class teacher announces that Vera's father has been killed in the Carpathian battle (Gorlice–Tarnów Offensive) on the German side and has therefore died a hero’s death. Although Vera is devastated and distraught, her reputation is restored and the shamed Anne Marie wants to make up for her bad behavior. Vera is now her best friend. Other important episodes: Anne Marie believes that a Thai man living in her building is a Japanese alien, an enemy, and henceforth no longer greets him. Lena, her nanny, tells her that rudeness is never patriotic. Anne Marie fears her mother is being treated badly in England. She says this to her doctor, a colleague of her father, who laughs: "The English don’t treat ladies badly, even when they belong to an enemy nation." One evening Anne Marie prays to God, asking that he assist Germany; but she realizes that perhaps French and English children pray to the same God. She then asks God to be neutral, at least. When Annemarie does not want to learn French because it is the language of the enemy, her teacher gives her a lesson in thinking ahead: After the war, relations between peoples will need to be rebuilt, language skills are mandatory, and the Fatherland needs an educated youth. Volume 4 ends with the surprising return of Mrs. Braun from England and the hope for a victorious peace.

== Postwar controversy ==
After 1945 the new publisher removed Nesthäkchen and the World War from the Nesthäkachen series, because it was on the censorship list of the allied control boards. Ury was, like the majority of German Jews, fiercely patriotic, and her descriptions of the events in and around the First World War were classified as glorifying war. Since 1945 the Nesthäkchen series has consisted of only 9 volumes.

Steven Lehrer translated Nesthäkchen and the World War into English in 2006.

== Critical reception ==
- "A uniquely sentimental look at World War I through the eyes of a preteen German girl. Though still immensely popular in Germany, Ury's Nesthäkchen books are virtually unknown in the United States, an omission Lehrer looks to correct with this fine translation, complete with notes and a brief but highly informative introduction." Kirkus Reviews
- "Ury's work has been long overlooked in German history, and Lehrer's annotated translation of this work has made an important contribution." H-Net Reviews
