= Nesthäkchen's First School Year =

Nesthäkchen’s First School Year
- Author: Else Ury
- Original title: Nesthäkchens Erstes Schuljahr
- Translator: Steven Lehrer
- Illustrator: Franz Kuderna
- Language: English
- Series: Nesthäkchen, volume 2
- Genre: Fiction/Adventure
- Publisher: SF Tafel
- Publication date: 2016
- Publication place: United States
- Media type: Print (trade paper)
- Pages: 244 pp (trade paper edition)
- ISBN: 1500686204
- Preceded by: Nesthäkchen and Her Dolls
- Followed by: Nesthäkchen in the Children's Sanitorium

Nesthäkchen's First School Year is the second book in the Nesthäkchen series, written by Else Ury. Nesthäkchen is a Berlin doctor's daughter, Anne Marie Braun, a slim, golden blond, quintessential German girl. The series follows Annemarie from infancy (Nesthäkchen and Her Dolls) to old age and grandchildren (Nesthäkchen with White Hair).

Nesthäkchen's First School Year, published in Berlin 1915 by Meidingers Jugendschriften Verlag, describes Annemarie's first school year.

== Plot summary ==
The book describes Anne Marie's school day in the German Empire. Her class has fifty pupils, taught by an attractive, sympathetic woman named Miss Hering. Anne Marie becomes friends with the neighbor's daughter, Margot Thielen, and two cousins, Marlene Ulrich and Ilse Hermann. Also Anne Marie is attracted to the naughty Hilde Rabe.

The best academic students sit in front. The less behaved sit in back. Anne Marie gets punished. Her behavior is also graded. Margot Thielen, her friend, sits in front.

In the editions of the book prior to the 1980s, Anne Marie's mother explains to her daughter that orderliness and behavior are more important than good grades for a girl. However, Anne Marie persists in her untidiness until she forgets one day to give her canary Mätzchen (Antics) fresh water. The bird dies, and Anne Marie realizes for the first time that sloppiness can have dire consequences. She gets a new bird for Christmas, whom she believes is her old bird born again. She becomes - at least until the end of the book - an orderly child and is permitted to give a children's party as a reward. Anne Marie learns the difficult art of knitting from her grandmother.

During the summer holidays she travels with her parents to Johannesbad (Janské Lázně) in the Riesengebirge (the venue of the holiday was not changed after 1945).

== Critical reception ==
"A young family favorite charms her teacher in this affecting novel from a century ago. Readers should be transported not only to an earlier era’s childhood world, but to a glowingly idealized version of that realm, and they will likely be as enchanted by Annemarie as were Ury’s original readers." Kirkus Reviews

"Oh, Oh, my work has a hole in it. Oh, Oh" Illustration by Franz Kuderna (1882–1943) from Nesthäkchens Erstes Schuljahr (1915).
