= Nesthäkchen Flies From the Nest =

1921 novel by Else Ury

- Author: Else Ury
- Original title: Nesthäkchen fliegt aus dem Nest
- Translator: Steven Lehrer
- Illustrator: Robert Sedlacek
- Language: English
- Series: Nesthäkchen, volume 6
- Genre: Fiction/Adventure
- Publisher: SF Tafel
- Publication date: 1921 (2016)
- Publication place: US
- Media type: Print (Trade Paper)
- Pages: 276 pp (Trade Paper edition)
- ISBN: 1530084636
- Preceded by: Nesthäkchen's Teenage Years
- Followed by: Nesthäkchen and Her Chicks

Nesthäkchen Flies From the Nest (German: Nesthäkchen fliegt aus dem Nest) is a 1921 German-language novel written by Else Ury. It is the sixth book in Ury's ten-book Nesthäkchen series, which follows protagonist Annemarie from infancy through old age. Nesthäkchen Flies From the Nest covers Annemarie's college days, courtship, and marriage.

== Plot summary ==
Original Dust Jacket, Nesthäkchen Fliegt aus dem Nest.

In this story, which takes place in the years 1922-1923, Annemarie goes with her girlfriends Ilse and Marlene to study in Tübingen. Annemarie wants to study medicine to become an assistant to her father. Only under the condition that she then continue her training in Berlin does he allow the academic year in Tübingen. Aunt Albertina does not agree that a young girl should leave her parental home alone.

On the journey Annemarie misses a train in Würzburg and loses Ilse and Marlene, but meets a young doctor, Rudolf Hartenstein, who likes her immediately. After arriving in Tübingen, Annemarie lives with Ilse and Marlene at the home of the couple Nepomuk and Veronika Kirchmäuser and their children Vronli and Kasper. The girls make friends with students Krabbe, Neumann, and Egerling, with whom they establish a "Swabian hiking covenant." Else Ury brings in here the Wandervogel movement, a motif popular at the beginning of the 20th century.

At a party in the home of Professor Bergholz, Annemarie meets Rudolf Hartenstein again, as well as his sister Ola. Over time, Annemarie and Rudolf fall in love. Their declaration of love occurs in a foggy cave, the Nebelhöhle, where Annemarie almost collapses into a deep abyss. Rudolf holds her fast and saves her at the last moment. At the Ulmer Münster, he asks Annemarie to marry him, but she refuses because she has promised her father to be his assistant.

In the summer semester Annemarie returns to Berlin to work in a clinic. Rudolf Hartenstein is also in Berlin and works as a doctor in the same hospital as Annemarie. He is Annemarie’s superior, and threes tension between the two. When they meet during a storm in the Charlottenburg Palace Park, Rudolf renews his declaration of love, and this time Annemarie gives in. The two marry just as Annemarie's brother Hans marries Rudolf's sister Ola.

In the first edition, there is an allusion to the lost World War I. From a train window, Annemarie sees the Burg Hohenzollern that "so proudly stands and suspects nothing of the sudden overthrow of the Hohenzollern dynasty". Some editions contain an additional chapter: an epilogue describing Annemarie’s future: she becomes the mother of a daughter, Vronli.

== Critical reception ==
"Lehrer’s translation, smooth-flowing and easily approachable, brings readers into this series of proto-Young Adult fiction set in the long-vanished world of a Germany before the horrors of World War II. The “Nesthäkchen” of these novels is the living embodiment of the purist, nationalistic sentimentality of that Germany. An effective translation of a series that gives eye-opening glimpses into the lives of the comfortable middle-class in Germany between the world wars." Kirkus Review
