= Jugend voraus =

1933 literary work by Else Ury

Youth to the Fore
- Author: Else Ury
- Original title: Jugend voraus
- Illustrator: Brynolf Wennerberg
- Language: German
- Genre: Fiction/Adventure
- Publisher: Meidingers Jugendschriften Verlag
- Publication date: 1933
- Publication place: Germany
- Media type: Hard Cover
- Pages: 207 pp
- Preceded by: Kläuschen und Mäuschen (1933)

Jugend voraus! is a children's book by Else Ury.

Ury did not experience January 30, 1933, the day of Hitler's seizure of power, as an existential threat. Like most Germans, she welcomed the "national uprising" and hoped that the misery of the post-war years would end and a new era would begin. In this spirit, she wrote Jugend voraus, a story for boys and girls. Once again, a completely normal family takes center stage in the story, and for the first time, Else Ury addresses the issue of unemployment.

== Plot summary ==
Father Felsing is a diligent bank employee. Mother is a prudent, thrifty, and educated mother and housewife. The four children, two boys and two girls, are each in their own way clever, talented, and lovable, as Ury's heroes always were. However, the idyllic family life is significantly disrupted in the spring of 1932. Father is "downsized," and the family is thrust into hardship through no fault of their own. The correct and hardworking bank employee is bewildered by his dismissal, and after a month, he must go to the welfare office. "Their savings were almost exhausted. He had to apply for unemployment benefits if his children were not to go hungry. It was the worst day the Felsings had ever experienced when Father went to 'stamp' for the first time." However, the loving wife and the brave children strive to support Father. The older ones find small earning opportunities, help with household chores, and do not complain about the growing inconveniences of subletting two rooms of the apartment. In difficult times, parents can rely on the helpfulness of their children. Mother even believes that the limitations make life more suitable. Throughout the story, Else Ury increasingly uses a vocabulary like what was last found in her war books. The homeland is invoked repeatedly, even in the most mundane everyday matters. The Felsing family's subtenant, a Japanese scientist, seeks a secretary and is surprised that Mother Felsing is willing to type his work. He argues that in Japan, a woman is supposed to be the ornament of the house and, of course, does not work. In response, Mrs. Felsing says, "We German women want to be that too. But our homeland needs the work of everyone, whether man or woman, to regain strength." The absurdity of this response is evident: with seven million unemployed, one cannot speak of needing the work of everyone. Moreover, "the homeland" does not need Mrs. Felsing; she needs the money for the next rent. This general-political elevation of everyday events takes up more and more space in the book from chapter to chapter. The summer work of 13-year-old Peter on a farm becomes a "defense of Fatherland" and a support for the farming class as the foundation of the German people. Naturally, it takes place again in Silesia. Agricultural work with a view of the Snowy Head. When he is hot and dusty while digging potatoes, the boy encourages himself with thoughts of German heroic deeds. Did others not endure much greater efforts and pain for their fatherland? Did they not sacrifice their healthy limbs, even their lives? And here he was complaining about a little back pain. "The soil from which he dug the potatoes was German soil." He helped to extract its yield for the homeland. So, grit your teeth and forge ahead. Even the eldest proudly shows an American businessman around the city of Berlin, and when the American leaves after five days, he has the most favorable impression of Germany and its youth. The invitation from the friendly tenant to come to Japan is proudly declined because, "Our German homeland needs its youth now. Each of us has the duty to help in the reconstruction. No one must give in to their own desires and desert their flag." This time, not only German Christmas is celebrated; the Japanese tenant is also enthusiastically celebrating a Protestant consecration. The confirmation or consecration, as it is called in Berlin, must be celebrated appropriately with so much new hope. Renate, a serious, industrious girl, has prepared intensively for this step and memorized all the sayings dutifully. The introductory words that the pastor gives her sound increasingly like the patriotic confessions of the German Christians: "Be faithful unto death, and I will give you the crown of life." It continues, "Yes," she wanted to be faithful, to her faith, her people, her duty. In the last chapter, Else Ury wrote: "And while winter and early spring fought for supremacy, (...) early spring entered the German government. Suddenly, it was there, the general national uprising of Germany. The willing Germans joined together under the leadership of Chancellor Hitler. They all wanted to help, to make Germany great and strong again, to free it from its economic distress. The entire German people united to put an end to the misery of the post-war years (...) Berlin was a sea of flags. Everyone hoped for better times. Leading the way, the youth, the hope of the German people." The hopes are fulfilled: Father has found work, and May 1, traditionally a day of labor struggle, suddenly appears as a national day of joy. "May 1 gilds the festival of national work with bright sunshine. Spring-green garlands decorate the houses, churches, and squares, winding across the streets of Berlin. Flags flutter colorfully in the spring breeze. Outside on Tempelhof Field, there is feverish activity. The hustle and bustle begin in the early dawn. Delivery trucks rattle to bring the groceries for the masses who want to celebrate the festival here. At the entrance to the lime trees, a large banner reads, 'Only a strong Germany can provide work for the German people.' Down the spring-green lime trees, which have already witnessed many great hours, down to the Lustgarten, flows a surging sea of school children. Youth marches. And while all the formations, associations, guilds, unions, and businesses, all of working Berlin, march out to Tempelhof Field, while thousands and tens of thousands are transported to the national festival of labor in specially decorated trains, flower-decked cars, and airplanes from outside the city, Berlin youth gathers for the national rally in the Lustgarten. Young Germany awaits the aged President Paul von Hindenburg and the Chancellor Hitler (...) The cheerful murmur of the children suddenly falls silent. From the castle ramp, the Berliner Singers Association (Berliner Sängerbund) solemnly plays the song 'Germany, you my fatherland.' Giant loudspeakers broadcast the rally (...) Only with difficulty can the car, embodying the old and young Germany, make its way past the living wall of youth cheering them on until it reaches the Lustgarten (...) A new wave of cheers as the President Paul von Hindenburg reaches the speaker's platform. Amidst a hundred thousand bright children's voices, it resounds: 'I have surrendered with heart and with hand to you, land full of love and life, my fatherland.' Despite the human flood, there is silence. The old field marshal continues. He greets the youth gathered here from all walks of life, to pledge themselves to the common fatherland, to the dutiful dedication to the nation, to respect for productive work. 'You are our future! You must take the heritage of our Fathers on your shoulders to preserve, strengthen, and expand it. Only he who learns to obey can later command. Only he who has reverence for the past of our people can master its future.' With a triple cheer for Germany, the elderly President concludes. The German national anthem resounds. The entire German people—all of them want to unite and help in national work. Youth leads the way!"

== Background ==
There were suspicions that someone had manipulated Jugend voraus against Else Ury's will and Nazified it without her knowledge. Meidingers Jugendschriften Verlag was a subsidiary of the Jewish department store conglomerate Wertheim. In 1941, Meidingers’ name ceased to exist, and its assets were taken over by the Globus Verlag, apparently an "Aryanization measure." The publishing house was probably under political pressure in 1933. The question remains whether Else Ury shaped the tenor of the book of her own accord or whether she was forced in some way. Financially, she did not need to applaud Hitler publicly against her convictions after 38 successful books and numerous other publications. Ury biographer Marianne Brentzel interviewed Ury's nephew Klaus Heymann, whose recollection dispels all doubts about the authenticity of the book. His aunt showed him the end of the book when he was age 15 and asked for his opinion. They were in the Riesengebirge, where Else Ury had a home, and what he read did not please him. He said she couldn't include such things in her book. "But she thought she had to, otherwise the whole thing wouldn't end correctly, and she wanted to conclude the story with this national uprising." Only about the last drawing of the League of German Girls in uniform and with the swastika flag did his aunt get terribly upset and ask the publisher to at least remove the swastika flag. "The publisher refused, and she was more than disappointed, she was quite angry about it. I still know that."
