= Wadden Sea =

Intertidal zone in the southeastern part of the North Sea

UNESCO World Heritage Site
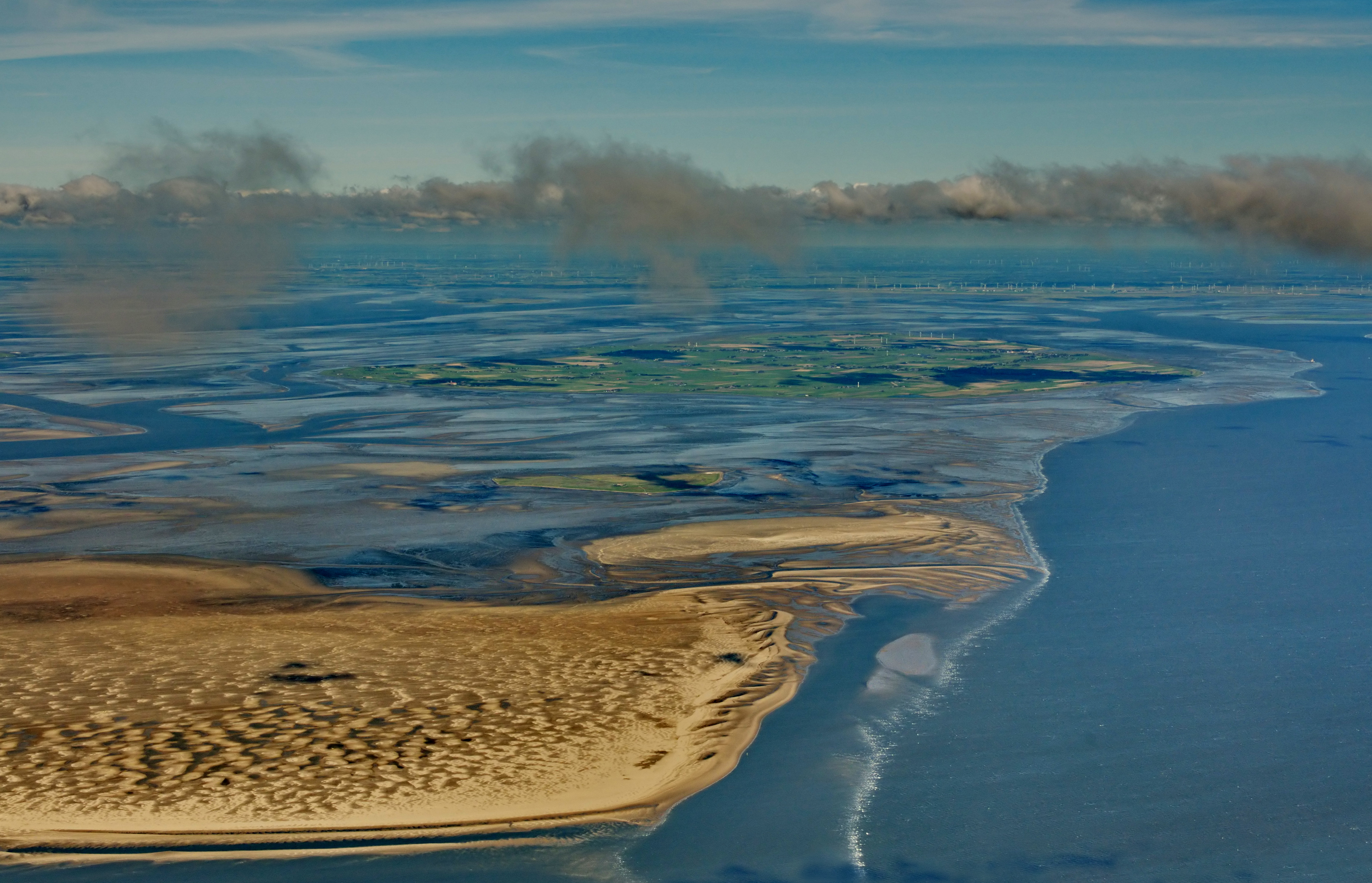
- The Wadden Sea at Süderoog in north Germany
- Interactive map of Wadden Sea
- Location: North Sea in Denmark, Germany and the Netherlands
- Criteria: Natural: viii, ix, x
- Reference: 1314
- Inscription: 2009 (33rd Session)
- Extensions: 2011, 2014
- Wadden Sea: 1. Lauwersmeer National Park, Netherlands; 2. Lower Saxon Wadden Sea National Park, Germany; 3. Hamburg Wadden Sea National Park, Germany; 4. Schleswig-Holstein Wadden Sea National Park, Germany; 5. Wadden Sea National Park, Denmark

The Wadden Sea (Dutch: Waddenzee [ˈʋɑdə(n)zeː]; German: Wattenmeer [ˈvatn̩ˌmeːɐ̯]; Low German: Wattensee or Waddenzee; Danish: Vadehavet; West Frisian: Waadsee; North Frisian: di Heef) is an intertidal zone in the southeastern part of the North Sea. It lies between the coast of northwestern continental Europe and the range of low-lying Frisian Islands, forming a shallow body of water with tidal flats and wetlands. It has high biological diversity and is an important area for both breeding and migrating birds. In 2009, the Dutch and German parts of the Wadden Sea were inscribed on UNESCO's World Heritage List and the Danish part was added in June 2014.

The Wadden Sea stretches from Den Helder, in the northwest of the Netherlands, past the great river estuaries of Germany to its northern boundary at Skallingen in Denmark along a total coastline of some 500 km (310 mi) and a total area of about 10,000 km^{2} (3,900 mi^{2}). Within the Netherlands, it is bounded from the IJsselmeer by the Afsluitdijk. Historically, the coastal regions were often subjected to large floods, resulting in thousands of deaths, including the Saint Marcellus' floods of 1219 and 1362, Burchardi flood of 1634 and Christmas Flood of 1717. Some of these also significantly changed the coastline. Numerous dikes and several causeways have been built, and as a result recent floods have resulted in few or no fatalities (even if some dikes rarely and locally have been overrun in recent history). This makes it among the most human-altered habitats on the planet.

== Environment ==
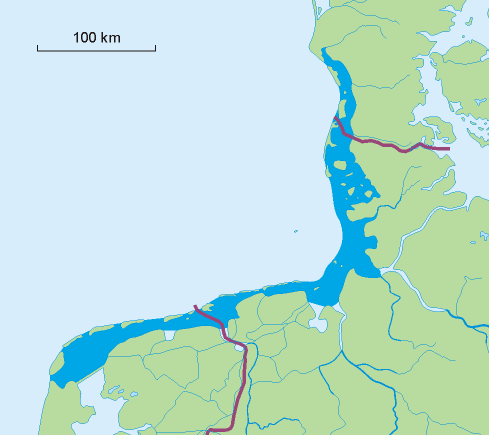
Map showing the Wadden Sea in dark blue.

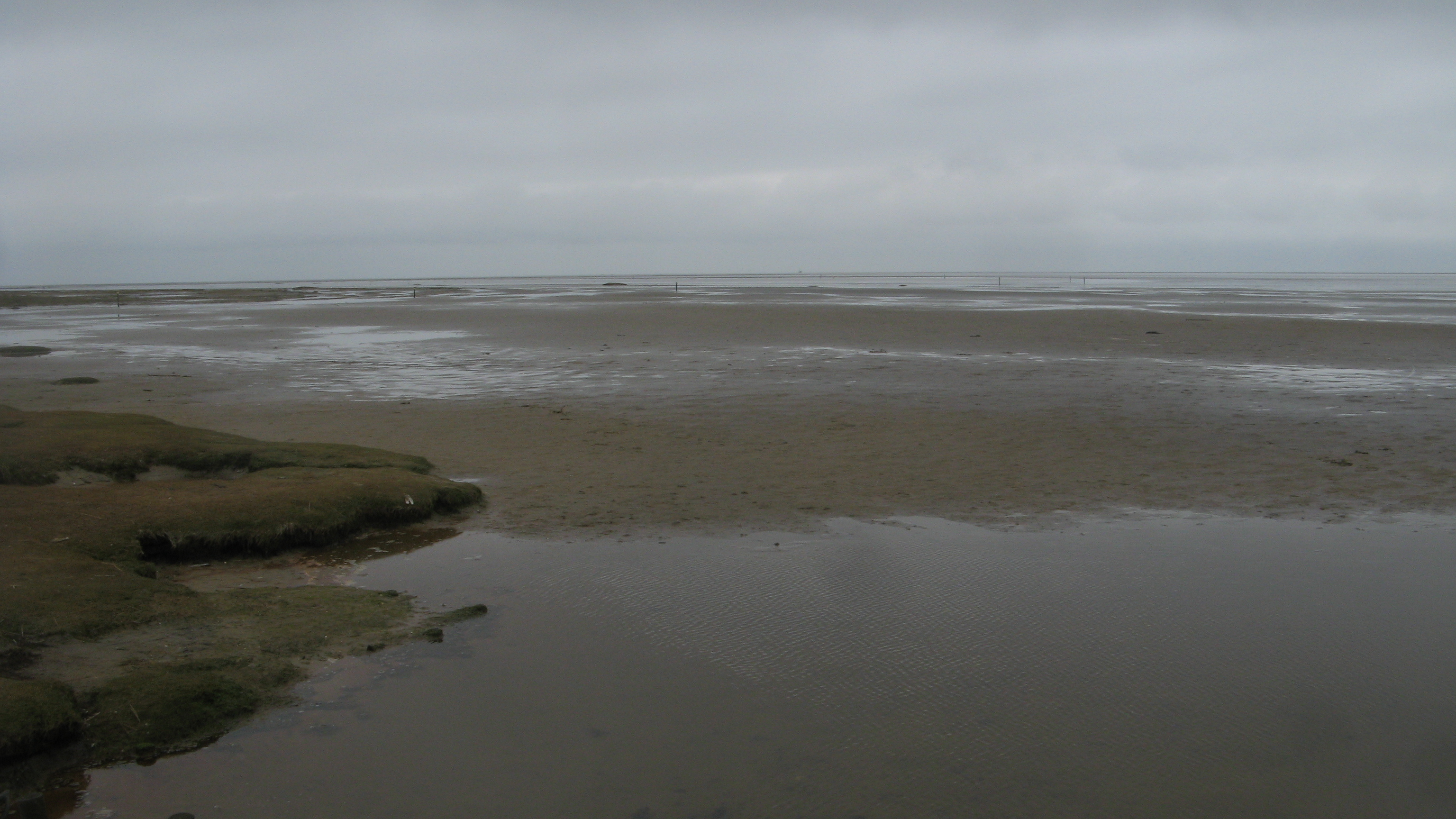
Salt marsh and mudflats in Westerhever, Germany

The word wad is Frisian and Dutch for "mud flat" (Low German and German: Watt, Danish: Vade). The area is typified by extensive tidal mud flats, deeper tidal trenches (tidal creeks) and the islands that are contained within this, a region continually contested by land and sea.

The landscape has been formed for a great part by storm tides in the 10th to 14th centuries, overflowing and carrying away former peat land behind the coastal dunes. The present islands are a remnant of the former coastal dunes.

Towards the North Sea the islands are marked by dunes and wide sandy beaches, and towards the Wadden Sea a low, tidal coast. The impact of waves and currents carrying away sediments is slowly changing both land masses and coastlines. For example, the islands of Vlieland and Ameland have moved eastwards through the centuries, having lost land on one side and gained it on the other.

Sea level rise poses a significant threat to areas with low-lying coastal areas with small gradients, such as the tidal flats of the Wadden Sea. However, recent studies indicate that the current sea level rise (3.7 mm/yr) is being exceeded by sediment accretion rates across most of these tidal flats, particularly along the German coastline.

== Fauna ==
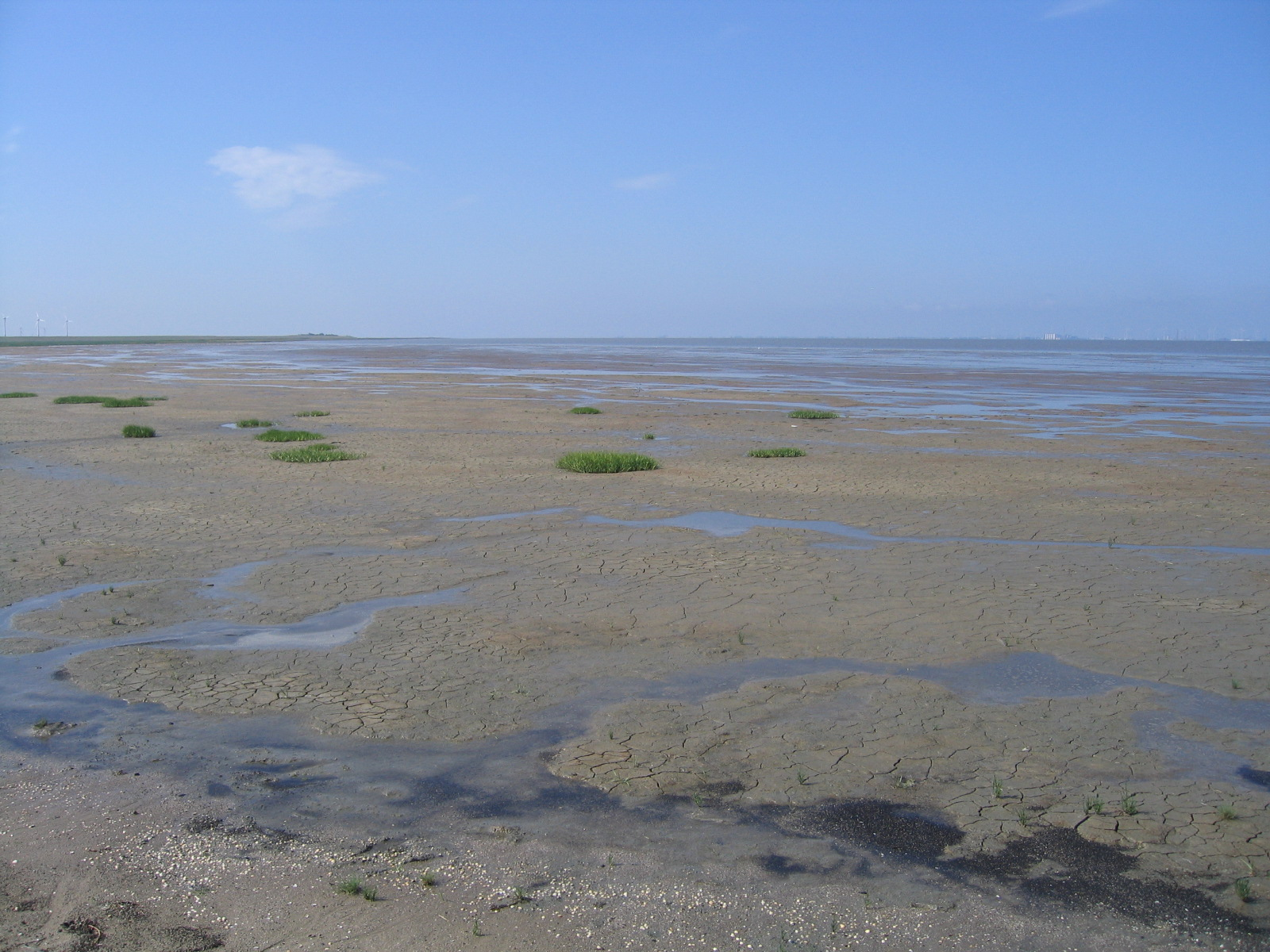
The mudflats of the Pilsumer Watt near Greetsiel, Germany.

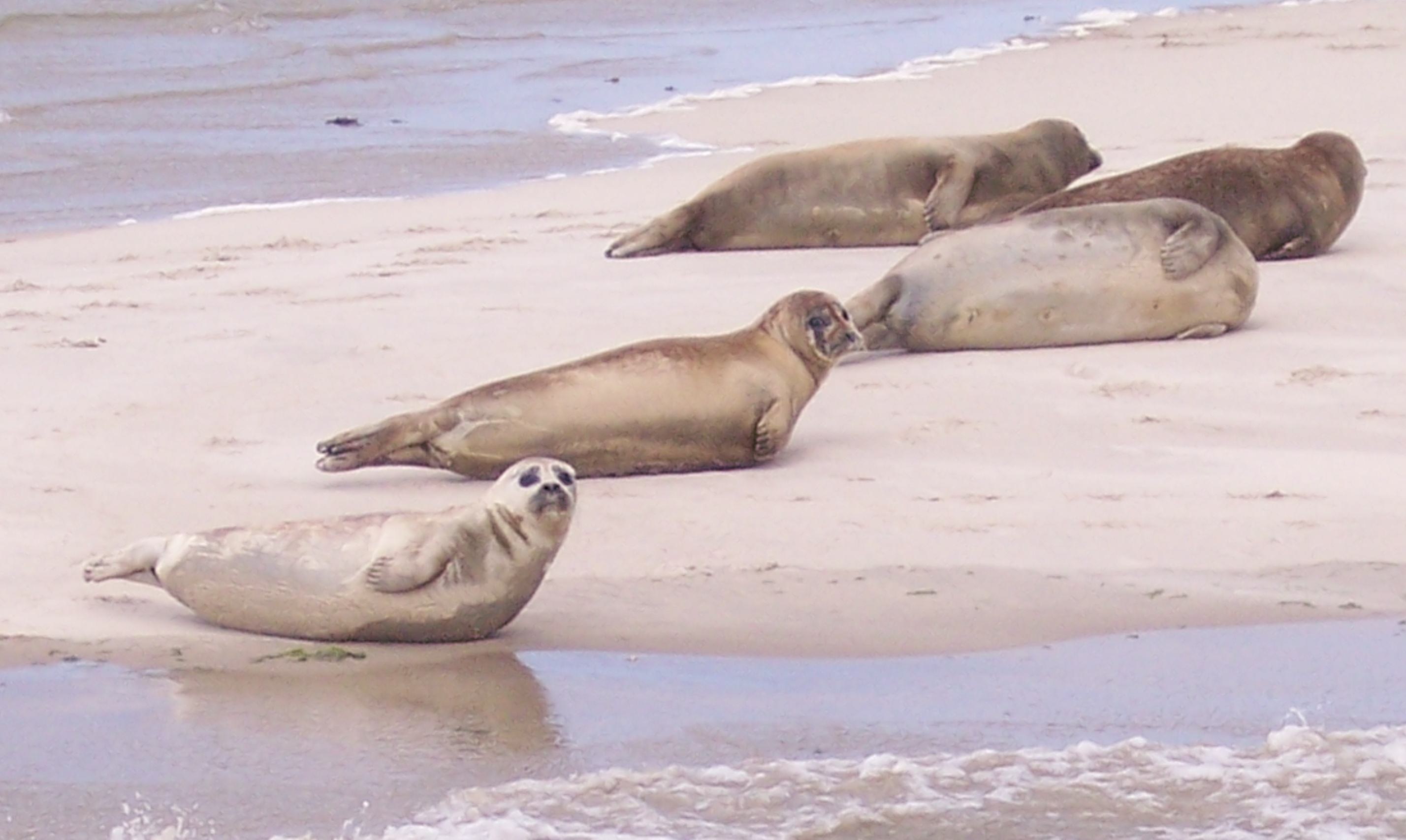
Harbor seals on Terschelling, Netherlands.

The Wadden Sea is famous for its rich flora and fauna, especially birds. Hundreds of thousands of waders, ducks, and geese use the area as a migration stopover or wintering site. It is also a rich habitat for gulls and terns, as well as a few species of herons, Eurasian spoonbills and birds-of-prey, including a small and increasing breeding population of white-tailed eagles. However, the biodiversity of Wadden Sea is smaller today than it once was; for birds, greater flamingos and Dalmatian pelicans used to be common as well, at least during the Holocene climatic optimum when the climate was warmer. Due to human activity and a changing environment, species have gone extinct, while others are expected to migrate in. According to UNESCO, this area may host up to 6.1 million birds at present, while an estimated 10-12 million birds migrate through the area annually.

Larger fish including rays, Atlantic salmon and brown trout are still present in several sections of the Wadden Sea, but others like European sea sturgeon only survive in the region through a reintroduction project. The world's only remaining natural population of houting survives in the Danish part of the Wadden Sea and it has been used as a basis for reintroductions further south, but considerable taxonomic confusion remains over its status (whether it is the same as the houting that once lived further south in the Wadden Sea). European oyster once formed large beds in the region and was still present until a few decades ago, when extirpated due to a combination of disease and the continued spread of the invasive Pacific oyster, which now forms large beds in the Wadden Sea. Especially the southwestern part of the Wadden Sea has been greatly reduced. Historically, the Rhine was by far the most important river flowing into this section, but it has been greatly reduced due to dams. As a result, about 90% of all the species that historically inhabited that part of the Wadden Sea are at risk.

The Wadden Sea is an important habitat for both harbour and grey seals. Harbour porpoises and white-beaked dolphins are the sea's only resident cetaceans. They were once extinct in the southern part of the sea but have also re-colonized that area again. Many other cetaceans only visit seasonally, or occasionally. In early history, North Atlantic right whales and gray whales (now extinct in the North Atlantic) were present in the region, perhaps using the shallow, calm waters for feeding and breeding. It has been theorized that they were hunted to extinction in this region by shore-based whalers in medieval times. They are generally considered long-extinct in the region, but in the Netherlands, a possible right whale was observed close to beaches on Texel in the West Frisian Islands and off Steenbanken, Schouwen-Duiveland in July 2005. Recent increases in the number of North Atlantic humpback whales and minke whales might have resulted in more visits and possible re-colonization by the species to the areas especially around Marsdiep. Future recovery of once-extinct local bottlenose dolphins is also expected.

== Conservation ==
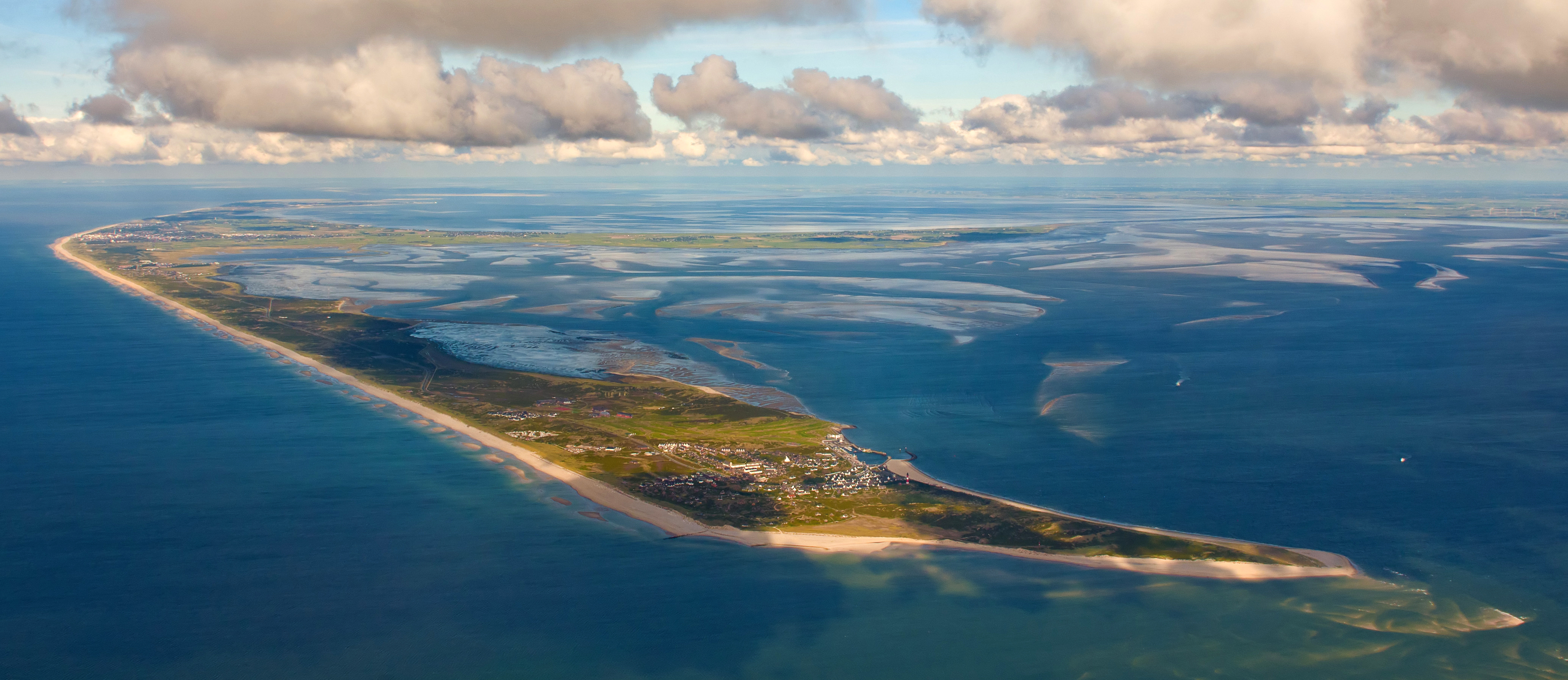
North Frisian Islands (Sylt).

A number of human-introduced invasive species, including algae, plants, and smaller organisms, are causing negative effects on native species.

Each of the three countries has designated Ramsar sites in the region (see Wadden Sea National Parks).

Although the Wadden Sea is not yet listed as a transboundary Ramsar site, a great part of the Wadden Sea is protected in cooperation of all three countries. The governments of the Netherlands, Denmark and Germany have been working together since 1978 on the protection and conservation of the Wadden Sea. Co-operation covers management, monitoring and research, as well as political matters. Furthermore, in 1982, a Joint Declaration on the Protection of the Wadden Sea was agreed upon to co-ordinate activities and measures for the protection of the Wadden Sea. In 1997, a Trilateral Wadden Sea Plan was adopted.

In 1986, the Wadden Sea Area was declared a biosphere reserve by UNESCO.

In June 2009, the Wadden Sea (comprising the Dutch Wadden Sea Conservation Area and the German Wadden Sea National Parks of Lower Saxony and Schleswig-Holstein) was placed on the World Heritage list by UNESCO. A minor boundary modification in 2011 added the Hamburg Wadden Sea National Park to the site, and the Danish part was added to in 2014. The state of Bremen, covering part of the Weser River estuary, is not participating. Conservation efforts are coordinated by the Common Wadden Sea Secretariat, seated in Wilhelmshaven.

== Recreation ==
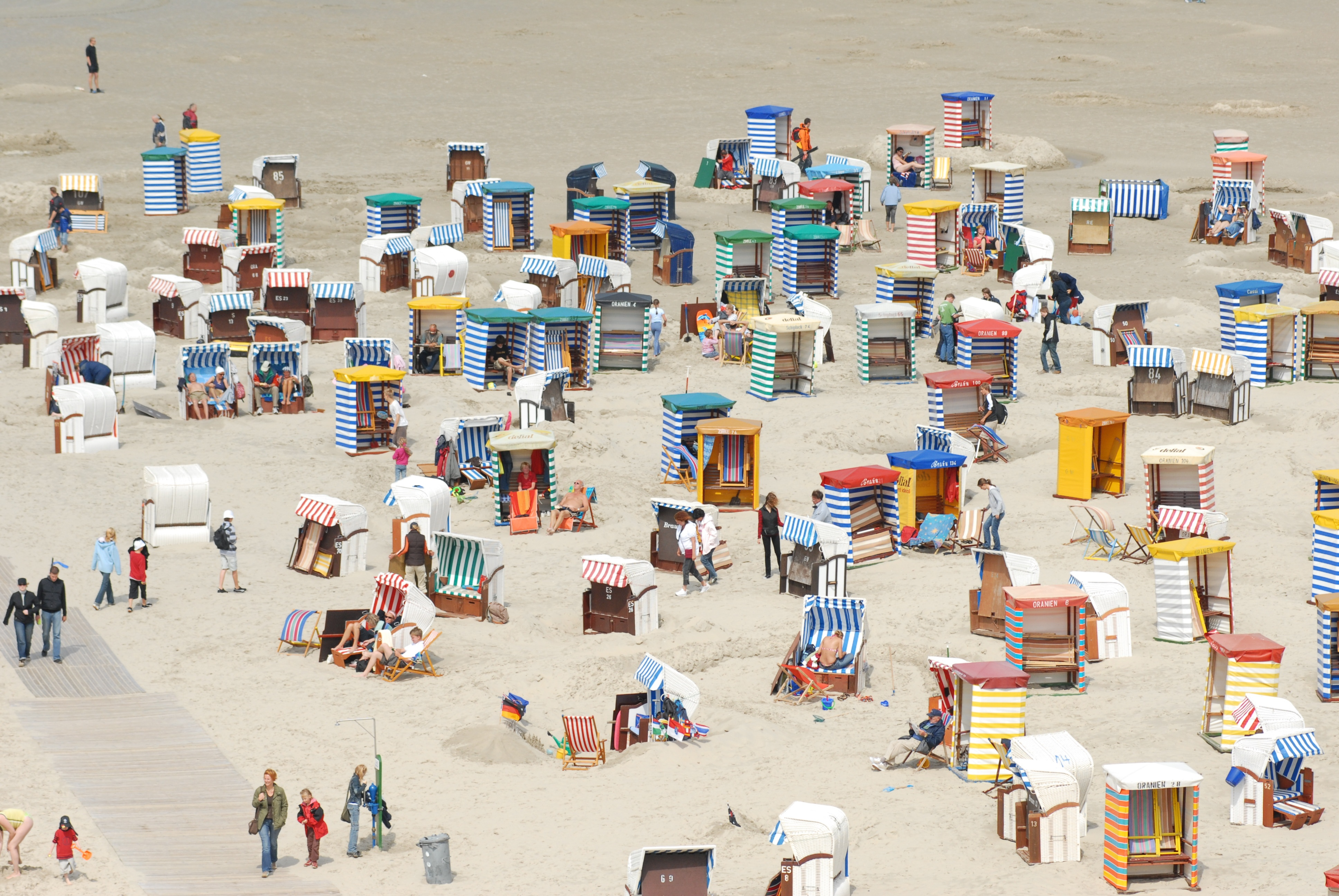
People on the beach on Borkum, Germany.

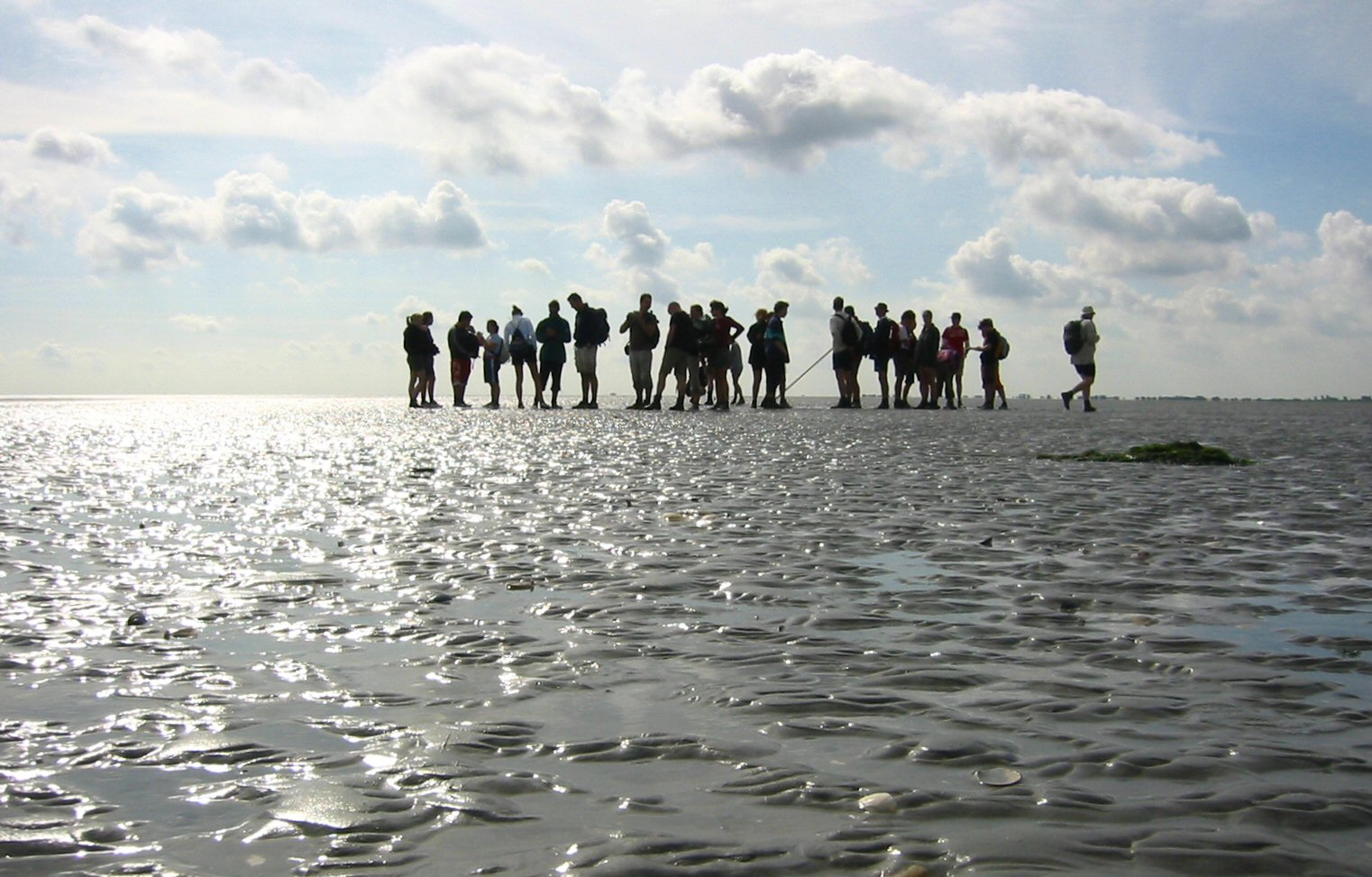
Mudflat hiking near Pieterburen, Netherlands.

Many of the islands have been popular seaside resorts since the 19th century.

Mudflat hiking, i.e., walking on the sandy flats at low tide, has become popular in the Wadden Sea.

It is also a popular region for pleasure boating.

== Literature ==
The German part of the Wadden Sea was the setting for the 1903 Erskine Childers novel The Riddle of the Sands and Else Ury's 1915 novel Nesthäkchen in the Children's Sanitorium.

== Wadden Sea Region ==
The area bordering the Wadden Sea, including the Frisian Islands and the mainland coastal marshes, is also called the Wadden Coast. In Germany the area is referred to as North Sea Coast (Nordseeküste). The embanked polderlands and saltmarshes in the Wadden Sea area – including the Elbe Marshes – are referred to in Germany as North Sea coastal marshes (Nordseemarschen).

More recent are terms such as Waddenland, Wadden Sea area and Wadden Sea Region. The latter term is generally understood to include all coastal regions around the Wadden Sea that participate in the trilateral cooperation between Denmark, Germany and the Netherlands. The entire area is known for its rich cultural heritage, dating back to the Roman Iron Age and the Middle Ages, and largely coincides with the area internationally referred to as Frisia. Between 2002 and 2023 stakeholder organizations and NGOs from the Wadden Sea Region cooperated in a platform or association called the Wadden Sea Forum (WSF).
