= Understanding Pediatric Heart Sounds =

2003 non-fiction work by Steven Lehrer

Understanding Pediatric Heart Sounds, 2nd edition
- Author: Steven Lehrer
- Original title: Understanding Pediatric Heart Sounds
- Cover artist: Kathi Goshi
- Language: English
- Genre: Nonfiction/Science
- Publisher: Elsevier
- Publication date: 2003
- Publication place: United States
- Media type: Print (Paperback) and audio-CD
- Pages: 237 pp (Paperback edition)
- ISBN: 1468138030 (Paperback edition)
- Preceded by: Understanding Pediatric Heart Sounds 1st edition (1992)
- Followed by: Understanding Lung Sounds

Understanding Pediatric Heart Sounds 2nd edition (2003) by Steven Lehrer is a book and audio CD that guides the student through the skills of pediatric heart auscultation. It provides a complete overview of pediatric heart examination, anatomy, physiology, and pathology. The audio CD presents and explains normal and abnormal heart sounds.
