= Understanding Lung Sounds =

- Author: Steven Lehrer
- Cover artist: Sheilah Barrett
- Language: English
- Genre: Nonfiction/science
- Publisher: Elsevier
- Publication date: 2002
- Publication place: United States
- Media type: Print (paperback), audio-CD
- Pages: 145 pp (paperback edition)
- ISBN: 1-9812 8406-0 (paperback edition)
- Preceded by: Understanding Lung Sounds 1st edition (1984), 2nd edition (1993)
- Followed by: Understanding Pediatric Heart Sounds

Understanding Lung Sounds 3rd edition (2002) by Steven Lehrer is a book and audio CD that guides the student through the skills of lung auscultation. It provides a complete overview of lung examination, anatomy, physiology, and pathology. The audio CD presents and explains normal and abnormal lung sounds.
