= Else Ury =

German Jewish novelist (1877–1943)

- Born: 1 November 1877; Berlin, German Empire
- Died: 13 January 1943 (aged 65); Auschwitz-Birkenau
- Cause of death: Gas poisoning
- Occupation: Novelist
- Known for: Nesthäkchen series and other books for girls

Else Ury (1 November 1877 – 13 January 1943) was a German-Jewish novelist and children's book author. Her best-known character is the blonde doctor's daughter Annemarie Braun, whose life from childhood to old age is told in the ten volumes of the highly successful Nesthäkchen series.

The books, the six-part TV series Nesthäkchen (1983), based on the first three volumes, as well as the new DVD edition (2005) caught the attention of millions of readers and viewers. During Ury's lifetime Nesthäkchen und der Weltkrieg (Nesthäkchen and the World War), the fourth volume, was the most popular.

Else Ury was a member of the German Bürgertum (middle class). She was pulled between patriotic German citizenship and Jewish cultural heritage. This situation is reflected in her writings, although the Nesthäkchen books make no references to Judaism. In 1943, Else Ury was deported to Auschwitz concentration camp, where she is thought to have died the day after her arrival.

== Life ==
Else Ury was born in Berlin on 1 November 1877, into a family of Jewish merchants. Her happy childhood and her life with the extended families Ury and Heymann provided the environment and inspiration to write her books. The prosperous bourgeois household with cook, governess, housemaid, doorman, and impressive furniture which is described by Else Ury in her Nesthäkchen series or in Studierte Mädel (1906) is a direct reflection of her life in Berlin, particularly after moving to the Kantstraße in Charlottenburg, and later on to Kaiserdamm. While her father Emil (1835–1920) became a successful merchant, her mother Franziska Ury (1847-1940) represented the German Bildungsbürgertum (educated middle class). Franziska passed her interest in classic and modern literature, the arts, and music on to her children.

Sustained by these concepts of Bildung (education), Else Ury's siblings started successful middle class careers: Ludwig (1870–1963) became a lawyer, Hans (1873–1937) a medical doctor. Käthe (7 October 1881 – 30 October 1944, murdered at Auschwitz), before getting married and starting a family, planned to train as a teacher. Else, however, despite attending the Lyzeum Königliche Luisenschule, chose not to pursue a profession. She started writing, under a pen name, for the Vossische Zeitung. In 1905, her first book, Was das Sonntagskind Erlauscht (What the Lucky Child Heard), was published by the Globus Verlag. This collection of thirty-eight moral tales promotes pedagogical ideals such as loyalty, honesty, and faithfulness. Ury's subsequent book Goldblondchen (1908) earned her an honorary remark by the influential Jugendschriftenwarte, and a further five publications built on this success, until, eventually, the Nesthäkchen series was published between 1918 and 1925 and made her a famous author.

"Instead of the girlish heads bent over their notebooks, Annemarie saw laughing soldiers." Illustration by Robert Sedlacek (1881–1957) from Nesthäkchen und der Weltkrieg (1921). This illustration contains one error. German soldiers wore field gray, not olive drab.

With over thirty-nine books Else Ury was not only one of the most prolific female writers of her time, she was also one of the most successful. The combination of an educated mind, humour and compassionate femininity made her books into best-sellers, and she was highly celebrated. On her fiftieth birthday, on 1 November 1927, for instance, her publisher, Meidingers Jugendschriften Verlag, honoured her with a large reception at the famous Hotel Adlon.

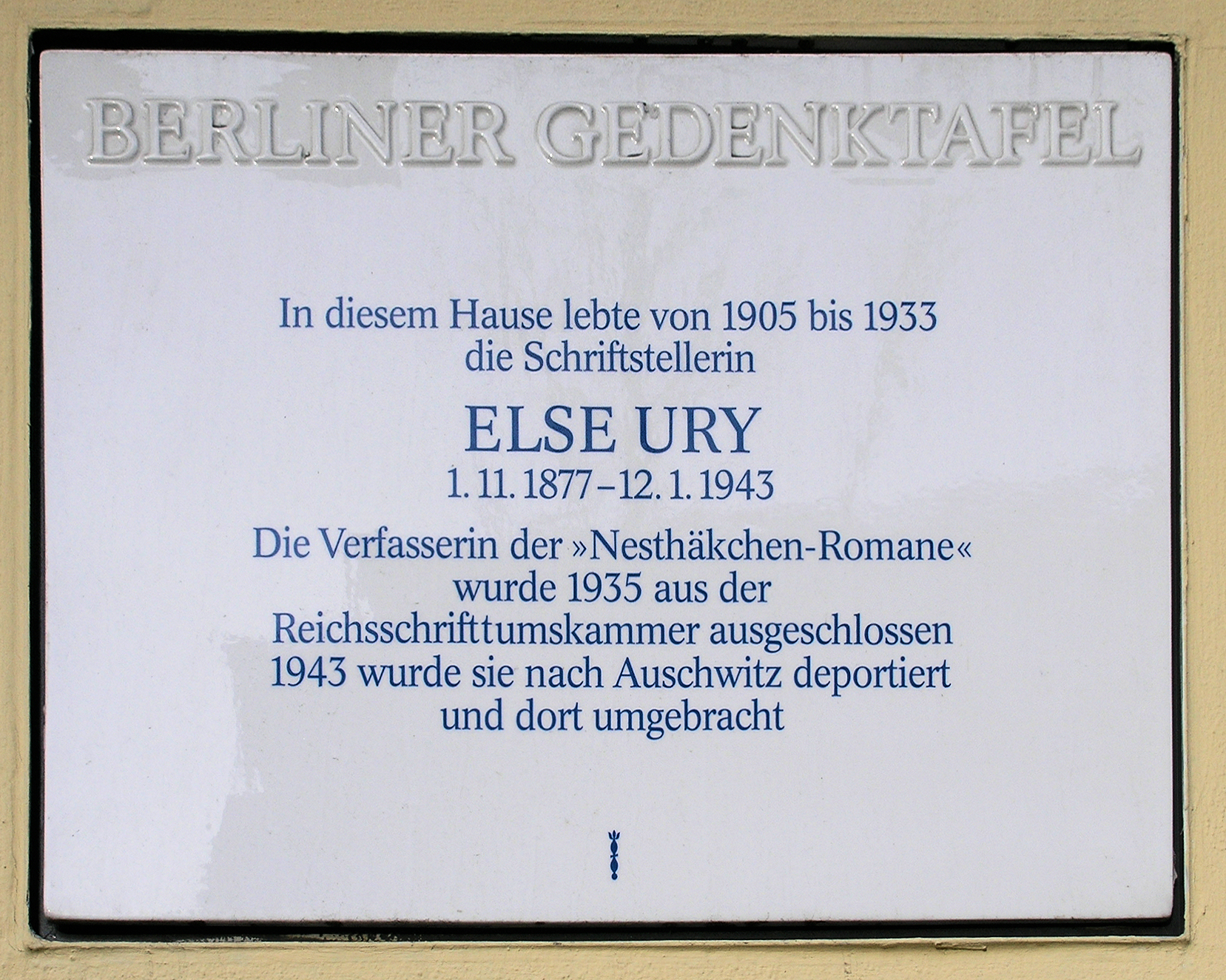
Berlin memorial plaque, Kantstraße 30, Berlin-Charlottenburg, Germany

Her writing made Else Ury rich. Not by an inheritance from her well-to-do father, but from her own earnings, she acquired a vacation home in Krummhübel (Karpacz) in the Riesengebirge. She dubbed the home Haus Nesthäkchen. By 1933, Ury had received 250,000 RM royalties for Nesthäkchen and another series, Professor's Twins, an astronomical sum at the nadir of the Great Depression. Millions of her fans bought her books, heard them read on the radio, attended her receptions, and read her newspaper columns. In the Weimar Republic, Else Ury had achieved superstar status.

== Hollywood ==
By 1939, Else Ury's situation in Germany had become untenable, and she had no hope that it would improve. Early that year she tried to market her work in the United Kingdom and the US, aspiring to establish an economic basis for emigration. She sent her stories to acquaintances in London, among them her 20-year-old nephew Klaus Heymann, who had immigrated to England because he was not allowed to study in Germany. But Klaus knew no one capable of making a literary English translation of her work. More promising was her contact with nephew Fritz, who had immigrated to England and was acquainted with a Berlin literary agent, Karl Ludwig Schröder. Schröder, in turn, was in contact with the Hollywood agent Paul Kohner, and knew that Hollywood was looking for material for its child stars. In a letter to Kohner, 10 March 1939, Schröder refers to Else Ury: "If a company in the USA has a child film star, I will make them aware of the non-aryan German writer Else Ury (millions of copies in print), whom I represent. I can send copies of her books from Berlin if they are not available. Her works have not been translated into English, although there are French, Dutch, and Norwegian editions." Kohner answered: "Material for child stars is of extraordinary interest. I ask you to send me as soon as possible any of Else Ury's books that might lend themselves to filming." Schröder's German-Jewish wife had immigrated to Rome, and Schröder was back and forth between Rome and Berlin. He wrote to Kohner, referring to his Berlin address, "because of the mail censor, please only write in terms that cannot be misunderstood". In his next letter, Schröder promised, "I write again about Else Ury and her children's books. I will immediately send you a selection of them if they can still be posted from Germany...I must say again that these books, published in the millions, are appropriate for children of all ages. For Shirley Temple, Ury's books would be just as good as the Swiss book Heidi." Kohner, who received this letter 2 June 1939, responded immediately, "We are awaiting your report here... But if you think that a book by Ury would be equally appropriate for Shirley Temple as Heidi, you're not acquainted with the fact that Heidi is a hugely successful and famous book in America." Apparently, in July 1939 (the letter is undated), Else Ury herself wrote to Kohner. She gave her address as "Solinger Straße 87, z. Zt. Krummhübel, Riesengebirge, Haus Nesthäkchen". Ury indicated that she had included volume 4, Nesthäkchen and the World War, and she described in general terms the contents of the other volumes. Ury suggested that the lead role in volume 6, Nesthäkchen Flies From the Nest, could be played by a big girl; a child star could take the role of Nesthäkchen's daughter in volume 7, Nesthäkchen and Her Chicks. Ury briefly mentions that the later volumes 8–10 could serve as a conclusion for the film, or the beginning of part two. She also suggested her book Baumeisters Rangen that, in her opinion, would make a good film story. She promised to send the books to Kohner's agency, and gave the address of her brother Ludwig as her business correspondent. Kohner answered 2 August 1939: "Dear Madam, I have your undated letter from last month, and I understand that Herr Karl L. Schröder will send me a number of your children's books. As soon as I receive them, I will have synopses prepared. You will have further information from me either at your address or the address of your brother. In the meantime, I send you warm greetings. (Paul Kohner)." The outbreak of World War II, 1 September 1939, ended all Ury's contacts and hopes. In Kohner's files, there is no further reference to Else Ury. Nor did she correspond again with Karl L. Schröder, who died in Rome, 23 September 1940.

== Deportation and death ==
Else Ury, 1915

As a Jew during the Holocaust, Ury was barred from publishing. She was stripped of her possessions and deported to the Auschwitz concentration camp along with 1190 other Berlin Jews on 12 January 1943. Ury received new media attention in 1992 through Marianne Brentzel's biography Nesthäkchen kommt ins KZ, and in 1995 a group of school girls saw her name written on a suitcase while on a school visit to Auschwitz. They were intrigued, looked through deportation lists and wrote a school report about Ury's deportation to the camp. Based on this, their teacher reported to the press that Ury had died on 13 January 1943. According to Steven Lehrer, she died in a gas chamber operated by guards from the Schutzstaffel in the camp.

== Postwar republication and television adaptation ==
After the war, Ury's books were re-published. An edited version of the Nesthäkchen series was issued by Hoch Verlag in 1952. The first volume was entitled, "Nesthäkchen and her Dolls". The only significant alteration: The fourth volume, "Nesthäkchen and the World War" (referring to the First World War), was not reprinted. A short final chapter in the third volume summarized the events of the fourth volume to provide continuity of the series.

The remaining nine volumes have been repeatedly reprinted, their total circulation more than seven million copies. German public television broadcaster ZDF filmed the beginning of the Nesthäkchen series as a 1983 Christmas show. In 2005, the ZDF programs were issued on DVD.

== Memorials to Else Ury ==
Marianne Brentzel published a 1994 biography of Ury with the title, Nesthäkchen arrives in the Concentration Camp which drew widespread public attention to Ury's murder at Auschwitz. Memorials to Ury have been placed in Berlin and Karpacz (the location of her vacation home). Her vacation home, located in present-day Poland, bears the title "Dom Nesthäkchen (the Nesthäkchen House)". After the war, the "Jew house" in Berlin-Moabit, Solingerstraße 10, her last Berlin residence before she was deported to Auschwitz, was demolished. An elevated memorial paving stone was laid in front, which reminds passers-by of Ury and her fellow Holocaust victims. An S-Bahn arch in Charlottenburg is named in her honor. A cenotaph in Berlin's Weissensee Jewish Cemetery (Jüdischer Friedhof Weißensee) commemorates her as well.

== Nesthäkchen and the World War ==
Else Ury describes in Nesthäkchen and the World War the experiences of Annemarie Braun, who is eleven years old when the story begins and thirteen when it ends. Annemarie's father serves as an army doctor in France. Annemarie's mother is in England with relatives and is not able to return to Germany due to the outbreak of war. Annemarie and her two older brothers, Hans and Klaus, are cared for by a grandmother. Much of Ury's narrative deals with Annemarie's experiences with a new classmate, the German-Polish Vera, who does not speak German at the beginning of the story. The popular, headstrong Annmarie coldly excludes Vera from her circle of friends as a foreigner and an alleged spy, making the beautiful, friendly Vera into a class pariah. The resolution of this painful relational aggression builds to a shocking, ringing climax, which has enthralled readers since the book's publication. Moreover, the ominously unfolding war in the background gives Nesthäkchen and the World War poignancy and depth. The book is a timeless commentary on the brutal nature of war.

After 1945 the new publisher removed Nesthäkchen and the World War from the Nesthäkachen series, because it was on the censorship list of the Allied control boards. Ury was patriotic toward Germany, and her descriptions of the events in and around the First World War were classified by the control boards as glorifying Germany's war. Since 1945 the Nesthäkchen series has consisted of only 9 volumes. Steven Lehrer translated Nesthäkchen and the World War into English in 2006 and Nesthäkchen in the Children's Sanitorium in 2014. Ury also wrote other books and stories, primarily for girls and young women. Most of Ury's books remain in print.

== Works ==
=== Nesthäkchen series ===
The Nesthäkchen series represents a German literary genre, the Backfischroman, a girls' novel that describes maturation and was intended for readers 12 – 16 years old. A Backfisch ("teenage girl"; literally, "fish for frying") is a young girl between fourteen and seventeen years of age. The Backfischroman was in fashion between 1850 and 1950. It dealt overwhelmingly with stereotypes, traditional social images of growing girls absorbing societal norms. The stories ended in marriage, with the heroine becoming a Hausfrau. Among the most successful Backfischroman authors, beside Else Ury, were Magda Trott, Emmy von Rhoden with her Der Trotzkopf and Henny Koch. Ury intended to end the Nesthäkchen series with volume 6, Nesthäkchen Flies From the Nest. Meidingers Jugendschriften Verlag, her Berlin publisher, was inundated with a flood of letters from Ury's young fans, begging for more Nesthäkchen stories. After some hesitation, Ury wrote four more Nesthäkchen volumes, and included comments about her initial doubts in an epilogue to volume 7, Nesthäkchen and Her Chicks.

- 1913/1918 Nesthäkchen und ihre Puppen (Translation: Nesthäkchen and Her Dolls)
- 1915/1918 Nesthäkchens erstes Schuljahr (Translation: Nesthäkchen's First School Year)
- 1915/1921 Nesthäkchen im Kinderheim (Translation: Nesthäkchen in the Children's Sanitorium)
- 1917/1921 Nesthäkchen und der Weltkrieg (Translation: Nesthäkchen and the World War)
- 1919 Nesthäkchens Backfischzeit (Translation: Nesthäkchen's Teenage Years)
- 1921 Nesthäkchen fliegt aus dem Nest (Translation: Nesthäkchen Flies From the Nest)
- 1923 Nesthäkchen und ihre Küken (Translation: Nesthäkchen and Her Chicks)
- 1924 Nesthäkchens Jüngste (Translation: Nesthäkchen's Youngest)
- 1924 Nesthäkchen und ihre Enkel (Translation: Nesthäkchen and Her Grandchildren)
- 1925 Nesthäkchen im weißen Haar (Translation: Nesthäkchen With White Hair)

=== Professors Zwillinge series ===
Herbert and Susie, affectionately known as “Bubi” and “Mädi”, are the heroes of the five-volume series Professor’s Twins. Their father, Professor Winter, was transferred to Naples and after a year of separation the family reunites under the southern sun in volume 3, Professor’s Twins in Italy, the most popular volume. Bubi and Mädi quickly adapt to their new surroundings, learn the language and attend school separately for the first time.Twin pairs had always fascinated Else Ury. Same-sex twins had already appeared as Nesthäkchen's Brazilian grandchildren in Volume 9, Nesthäkchen and Her Grandchildren. Usually, the children are different in character and temperament, and Else Ury uses the duplication for various mix-up anecdotes. But not Professor Winter's twins. Here, it's a girl and a boy. The girl is always the shy, fearful, obedient one, and the boy is the brave, clever, abstract-thinking little explorer. In volume 2, Professors Zwillinge in der Waldschule, they attend the "Waldschule" (Forest School), a modern institution where boys and girls are taught together. This school really existed in Berlin. In 1925, it was a rare form of school with exceptionally progressive pedagogy. Founded in 1904 as a reform pedagogical project for children in need of recreation in Charlottenburg, it was established as a high school during the summer months from 1919 and as a year-round day school for both genders from 1923. Classes often took place outdoors, and the children were encouraged to explore nature. As for the twins, Professor Winter receives a scientific assignment at the observatory in Naples, and the family moves to Italy for a year. It is unclear whether working on this volume inspired Else Ury to go to Italy herself or if her own trip had inspired the book. In 1927, Professor's Twins in Italy was published by Meidingers Jugendschriften Verlag. Traveling to Italy had been popular in German bourgeois education since Goethe. People traveled with Goethe and the art history of Johann Joachim Winckelmann, narrowing their focus to seemingly timeless cultural monuments. The Italy of 1927, marked by post-war chaos, where the leader of the fascists had come to power and persecuted and expelled any opposition, is not in this story. In the Ury family album, there is a postcard photograph. It shows Else and her brother Hans Ury with radiant happy faces on St. Mark's Square in Venice, surrounded by doves. Else Ury writes, "The bridal couple sends warm regards from Venice."

- 1923 Professors Zwillinge Bubi und Mädi
- 1925/1926 Professors Zwillinge in der Waldschule
- 1927 Professors Zwillinge in Italien
- 1928 Professors Zwillinge im Sternenhaus
- 1929 Professors Zwillinge – Von der Schulbank ins Leben

=== Novels ===
- 1906 Studierte Mädel
- 1908 Goldblondchen
- 1910 Baumeisters Rangen
- 1911 Vierzehn Jahr' und sieben Wochen
- 1913 Kommerzienrats Olly
- 1914 Das graue Haus
- 1916 Dornröschen
- 1917 Das Ratstöchterlein von Rothenburg
- 1918 Flüchtlingskinder
- 1919 Lieb Heimatland
- 1920 Lilli Liliput
- 1921 Hänschen Tunichgut
- 1925 Lillis Weg
- 1929 Studierte Mädel von heute
- 1930 Das Rosenhäusel
- 1930 Wie einst im Mai
- 1933 Kläuschen und Mäuschen
- 1933 Jugend voraus

=== Short story collections ===
- 1905 Was das Sonntagskind erlauscht
- 1910 Babys erstes Geschichtenbuch
- 1914 Huschelchen
- 1917 Lotte Naseweis
- 1923 Jungmädelgeschichten
- 1931 Wir Mädels aus Nord und Süd
- 1932 Für meine Nesthäkchenkinder
