= Nesthäkchen and Her Dolls =

- Author: Else Ury
- Original title: Nesthäkchen und ihre Puppen
- Translator: Steven Lehrer
- Illustrator: Robert Sedlacek
- Language: English
- Series: Nesthäkchen, volume 1
- Genre: Fiction/Adventure
- Publisher: SF Tafel
- Publication date: 2016
- Publication place: US
- Media type: trade paper
- Pages: 224 pp
- ISBN: 1530642000
- Followed by: Nesthäkchen's First School Year

A Nesthäkchen is the youngest child in a family. Else Ury's Nesthäkchen is a Berlin doctor's daughter, Annemarie Braun, a slim, golden blond, quintessential German girl. The ten-book Nesthäkchen series follows Annemarie from infancy (Nesthäkchen and Her Dolls) to old age and grandchildren (Nesthäkchen with White Hair). The first volume of the series, originally published by Meidingers Jugendschriften Verlag Berlin 1913, tells the story of Annemarie's early life.

== Plot summary ==
"Annemarie clamped her teeth firmly together so that she would not utter a sound as Fräulein set the huge sponge in motion and annoyingly rubbed," from Nesthäkchen und ihre Puppen (1913).

The main character of the series is six-year-old Annemarie Braun, born in the early 1900s in the German Empire. Her family lives in the Berlin district of Charlottenburg, on Knesebeckstraße. Annemarie's father is Dr. Edmund Braun. Her mother Elsbeth is a housewife. Annemarie's older brothers are the virtuous Hans (the oldest) and the cheeky Klaus. As the youngest child in the family, Annemarie is referred to as "Nesthäkchen," but she is also nicknamed "Lotte." Other residents of the Braun home are the cook Hanne, who refers to Annemarie as "her" child, the maid Frieda, the nanny Lena, called "Fräulein" by Annemarie, the dog Puck, and Annemarie's canary Antics. The extended family includes a maternal grandmother and grandmother's sister Albertina. Mother Elsbeth's sister Kate lives on an estate in Silesia, "Arnsdorf," with Uncle Henry and her children Ellie, Herbert and Peter.

Nesthäkchen and Her Dolls describes the everyday adventures of little Annemarie in the years 1909 and 1910. Because Annemarie is a "higher daughter," she is not allowed to play with the other (socially subordinate) children in the courtyard and she spends most of her time with her dolls. Her favorite is the doll Gerda. Often the "thoughts" of the dolls are portrayed. They represent moral authority and are the voice of Else Ury. When Gerda's doll wig comes off, Annemarie cuts off one of her own braids, which she believes will grow on her bald doll's head.

To escape the chaos of house cleaning, Annemarie must usually go for a walk with her nanny. Annemarie hopes for rain. She has heard that when it rains, "the barometer falls" and decides to help by taking Father's barometer off the wall and dropping it on the floor. An organ grinder makes Annemarie forget the prohibition of playing with socially subordinate children. She dances with the other children in the courtyard and runs with them, behind the hurdy-gurdy man, through the streets of Charlottenburg. With a sailor girl, Lina, Annemarie trades her fine shoes for Lina's clogs.

Annemarie visits her relatives on their estate, Arnsdorf, where the sheltered city child experiences the freedom of unsupervised play outdoors for the first time. As Annemarie is bored at home, her mother sends her to a nursery school, a surprisingly modern choice in the early 20th century. The book ends with the celebration of Christmas and a reflection on Annemarie's upcoming first school year. Annemarie holds a doll wedding to say farewell to her toys.

== Critical reception ==
"The warm and inviting earliest adventures of a favorite children’s book character from another era." Kirkus Reviews

== Predecessor ==
Annemarie is a spirited and lively child, similar to Der Trotzkopf (literally: "The Stubborn Head") of author Emmy von Rhoden. Ilse Macket, von Rhoden's heroine, is a predecessor of Else Ury's Nesthäkchen, Annemarie Braun. Ilse, like Annemarie, is vivacious and frequently disobedient. Ilse is popular nevertheless, not because of tedious learned virtues, but because of her kindness, honesty and unpretentiousness. Like Annemarie, Ilse is her father's favorite.
