= Meidingers Jugendschriften Verlag =

German children's publisher

- Parent company: Globus Verlag
- Founded: 1869
- Founder: Hermann J. Meidinger
- Country of origin: Germany
- Publication types: Books

Meidingers Jugendschriften Verlag was a German children's publisher best known for the Nesthäkchen books of Else Ury.

== Early years ==
Original Dust Jacket, Nesthäkchen im Kinderheim by Else Ury. Illustration by Robert Sedlacek, published by Meidingers Jugendschriften Verlag

Meidingers Jugendschriften Verlag’s history began on January 1, 1869, when Hermann Joseph Meidinger (b 20 Jun 1842, Rödelheim, d 15 May 1898, Berlin) founded in Berlin the publishing company Herm. J. Meidinger. After his death in 1898, his widow Therese Meidinger took over the business. As of May 1, 1907, the children’s book department was spun off from the company. This was the birth of Meidingers Jugendschriften Verlag GmbH. On May 18, 1907, Meidingers Jugendschriften Verlag GmbH was taken over by the Wertheim Department Store and combined with Globus Verlag GmbH, founded 1898, which was the publishing house of Wertheim. Globus published the works of Jules Verne: Twenty Thousand Leagues Under the Seas and Around the World in Eighty Days.

== Later years ==
Hermann J. Meidinger, 1898

Meidingers Jugendschriften Verlag’s main office was at Globus Verlag, but it was known as Meidingers Jugendschriften Verlag GmbH. Until 1908 the headquarters was at Voßstraße 33 in Berlin W 9, then in the Kaiserhofstraße 1, Berlin W 66. From 1919 all publishers belonging to Wertheim moved to a new business address at Wilhelmstraße 45, Berlin W 66 (later W 8 at Postbezirk 1). At the same time Globus founded their own book printing company, the Globushaus Druckerei, Berlin W 66.

== Else Ury ==
Meidingers Jugendschriften Verlag gained fame among readers in the 1920s and 1930s through the 1.25 million book series Nesthäkchen by Else Ury. Ury’s books were immensely popular among the pre-World War II generation of youth. On her fiftieth birthday, 1 November 1927, Meidingers Jugendschriften Verlag honored Ury with a large reception at the Hotel Adlon. Ury was Jewish and not allowed to publish after the beginning of the Nazi period. She was murdered at Auschwitz in 1943.

== Aryanization ==
After the National Socialist seizure of power in 1933 and the associated Aryanization of Wertheim, the changes in Meidingers Jugendschriften Verlag are difficult to follow. Around 1937, the company moved to Bellevuestraße 5 in Berlin W 9. In 1939 the Managing Director Emil Kersten liquidated Meidingers. In 1941 all Meidingers’ books went out of print and existing stocks went to the Globus Verlag GmbH.
