= Steven Lehrer =

American physician and writer

- Born: 1944 (age 80–81); Los Angeles
- Occupation(s): Physician, writer, translator
- Known for: Medical research
- Spouse: Pamela Dunn (married 1971)

Steven Lehrer (born 1944) is a physician and writer, known for medical research and for his English translation of Else Ury.

== Early years and education ==
Lehrer was born in Los Angeles. He attended UCLA and graduated from Johns Hopkins University and Johns Hopkins School of Medicine.

== Career ==
After training and specialty board certification, Lehrer worked as a radiologist, radiation oncologist, and nuclear medicine physician.

== Medical research ==
Lehrer has published on the topics of breast cancer and the estrogen receptor, prostate cancer, puberty and pregnancy. He published two medical textbooks, Understanding Lung Sounds and Understanding Pediatric Heart Sounds.

== Writer ==
Lehrer published the first English translation of the most popular book of German children's writer Else Ury, Nesthäkchen and the World War. He has published plays, a novel, books on German history, the Holocaust, and the history of medicine. He edited a collection of the stories of Frank Buck and published English translations of Tanks Break Through! by Alfred-Ingemar Berndt and From Lemberg to Bordeaux by Leo Leixner. Lehrer was interviewed on the History Channel series Mavericks, Miracles, and Medicine about his book Explorers of the Body, as well as by the BBC for their series, Medical Mavericks, Beating Infection (episode 4).
