= Robert Sedlacek =

Austrian illustrator

- Born: July 23, 1881; Vienna
- Died: May 15, 1957 (aged 75); Vienna
- Occupation: illustrator
- Known for: Illustrating Nesthäkchen books of Else Ury

Robert Sedlacek, b. 23 July 1881 in Vienna, died 15 May 1957 in Vienna, was a commercial artist and illustrator. He illustrated the Nesthäkchen books of Else Ury.

== Early years ==
Original Dust Jacket, Nesthäkchen im Kinderheim. Illustration by Robert Sedlacek

Sedlacek trained with Siegmund L'Allemand, 1900-1904, at the Academy of Fine Arts Vienna and became a middle school teacher 1904.

== Later career ==
From 1945 to 1952 Sedlacek was a member of the Professional Association of Visual Artists in Vienna. He worked as a graphic artist for industry (including advertisements for 4711 cologne and Persil laundry detergent) and illustrated more than 200 books. He was employed by the publications Die Muskete and Lustige Blätter and published his illustrations in Zurich and Vienna. For Meidingers Jugendschriften Verlag Sedlacek illustrated the Nesthäkchen books of Else Ury with colored, full-page glossy images as well as black and white pen drawings. In later editions he changed his illustrations slightly, adapting to the style of the time.
