= Reversal of Fortune (disambiguation) =

Reversal of Fortune is a 1990 film adaptation of the book of the same name by Alan Dershowitz.

Reversal of Fortune or similar terms may also refer to:

- Reversal of Fortune (2003 film), a South Korean film
- Reversal of Fortune (2005 film), a documentary film about a homeless man who receives $100,000 anonymously
- "A Reversal of Fortune", an episode of Yu-Gi-Oh!
- "Reversals of Fortune", an episode of Gossip Girl
