= Settle the Score =

Settle the Score may refer to:

- Settle the Score (album), a 2008 EP by Fight Fair
- "Settle the Score" (song), a song from the Space Jam: A New Legacy soundtrack
- Settle the Score (band), a German hardcore punk band

== See also ==
- Settling the Score
