= List of Yu-Gi-Oh! episodes =

Yu-Gi-Oh! (遊戯王, Yūgiō; lit. 'Game King') is a manga series by Kazuki Takahashi that was adapted into three television anime series and several films.

The original 1998 anime series was produced by Toei Animation and was broadcast in Japan from April 4, 1998, to October 10, 1998, running for 27 episodes. Yu-Gi-Oh! Duel Monsters was animated by Studio Gallop and ran for 224 episodes, premiering in Japan on April 18, 2000, and concluding on September 29, 2004. Yu-Gi-Oh! Capsule Monsters was an original miniseries commissioned by 4Kids Entertainment for broadcast in the United States, where it aired twelve episodes from September 9 to November 25, 2006.

== Yu-Gi-Oh! (1998) ==
The series opening theme was "A Yell of Thirst" (渇いた叫び, Kawaita Sakebi) by Field of View, while the ending theme was "Even if You Break Tomorrow" (明日もし君が壊れても, Ashita Moshi Kimi ga Kowaretemo) by WANDS.

No.	Title	Written by	Original release date
1	"Furious Battle – A Dark Game"; Transliteration: "Gekiretsu Batoru – Yami no Gēmu" (Japanese: 激烈バトル 闇のゲーム)	Toshiki Inoue	April 4, 1998
2	"The Devil Gamer – The Trap of Hell"; Transliteration: "Akuma Gēmā – Jigoku no Wana" (Japanese: 悪魔ゲーマー 地獄の罠)	Toshiki Inoue	April 11, 1998
3	"Clash! The Strongest Monster"; Transliteration: "Gekitotsu! Saikyō no Monsutā" (Japanese: 激突！最強のモンスター)	Yasuko Kobayashi	April 18, 1998
4	"Theft! The Legendary Super Rare Watch"; Transliteration: "Gōdatsu! Chō Maboroshi no Geki Rea Tokei" (Japanese: 強奪！超幻の激レア時計)	Kenichi Kanemaki	April 25, 1998
5	"Now Revealed!! Yugi's Secret"; Transliteration: "Ima Abakareru!! Yūgi no Himitsu" (Japanese: 今暴かれる！！遊戯の秘密)	Toshiki Inoue	May 2, 1998
6	"Desperate Situation!! The Passionate Battle of Friendship."; Transliteration: "Zettai Zetsumei!! Atsuki Yūjō Kessen" (Japanese: 絶体絶命！！熱き友情決戦)	Toshiki Inoue	May 9, 1998
7	"The Underhanded Digital Pet Rebellion"; Transliteration: "Urawaza Dejitaru Petto Sōdō" (Japanese: 裏技デジタルペット騒動)	Yasuko Kobayashi	May 16, 1998
8	"The Four Game Masters Finally Move Out"; Transliteration: "Gēmu Shitennō Tsuini Ugoku" (Japanese: ゲーム四天王ついに動く)	Kenichi Kanemaki	May 23, 1998
9	"Explosion – The Ultimate Secret Yo-Yo Technique"; Transliteration: "Sakuretsu – Yō-Yō Kyūkyoku no Higi" (Japanese: 炸裂 ヨーヨー究極の秘技)	Toshiki Inoue	May 30, 1998
10	"The Pressing Beautiful Teacher – The Secret Mask"; Transliteration: "Semaru Bijin Kyōshi – Himitsu no Kari" (Japanese: 迫る美人教師 秘密の仮)	Katsuhiko Chiba	June 6, 1998
11	"The Rumored Capmon – It's a New Arrival"; Transliteration: "Uwasa no Kapumon – Shin Tōjō da ze" (Japanese: 噂のカプモン 新登場だぜ)	Yasuko Kobayashi	June 13, 1998
12	"The Extremely Lucky Enemy – The Invincible Legend"; Transliteration: "Kyōun wo Yobu Teki – Fuhai no Shinwa" (Japanese: 強運を呼ぶ敵 不敗の神話)	Toshiki Inoue	June 20, 1998
13	"Target the Schoolgirls – The Fangs of Great Prophecies"; Transliteration: "Onna Seito wo Nerau – Dai Yogen no Kiba" (Japanese: 女生徒を狙う 大予言の牙)	Yasuko Kobayashi	June 27, 1998
14	"A Bomb Game Makes for the Worst Date"; Transliteration: "Bakuha Gēmu de Saiaku Dēto" (Japanese: 爆破ゲームで最悪デート)	Katsuhiko Chiba	July 4, 1998
15	"Scary Woman!! Unable to Transform"; Transliteration: "Kowai Onna!! Henshin Dekinai" (Japanese: 怖〜い女！！変身できない)	Toshiki Inoue	July 11, 1998
16	"Turnabout by a Hair's Breadth – The White-Robed Crisis"; Transliteration: "Ippatsu Gyakuten – Hakui no Kiki" (Japanese: イッパツ逆転 白衣の危機)	Yasuko Kobayashi	July 18, 1998
17	"A Last Minute Match – The Model that Invites"; Transliteration: "Girigiri Shōbu – Izanau Moderu" (Japanese: ギリギリ勝負 誘うモデル)	Katsuhiko Chiba	July 25, 1998
18	"Don't Touch the Forbidden Game"; Transliteration: "Kindan Gēmu ni Tewodasuna" (Japanese: 禁断ゲームに手を出すな)	Toshiki Inoue	August 1, 1998
19	"The Great Melee!! A Popularity Contest"; Transliteration: "Dai Ransen!! Ninki Kontesuto" (Japanese: 大乱戦！！人気コンテスト)	Yasuko Kobayashi	August 8, 1998
20	"It's Here!! The Strongest and Final Trump Card"; Transliteration: "Deta!! Saikyō Saigo no Kirifuda" (Japanese: 出た！！最強最後の切り札)	Toshiki Inoue	August 15, 1998
21	"Complete!! The Ultimate Game Land"; Transliteration: "Kansei!! Kyūkyoku no Gēmu Rando" (Japanese: 完成！！究極のゲームランド)	Katsuhiko Chiba	August 22, 1998
22	"Breakthrough – Borderline Shooting"; Transliteration: "Yabure – Genkai Shūtingu" (Japanese: 破れ 限界シューティング)	Yasuko Kobayashi	August 29, 1998
23	"Capumon King! Showdown for the Top!!"; Transliteration: "Kapumon Ō! Chōjō Kessen!!" (Japanese: カプモン王！頂上決戦！！)	Toshiki Inoue	September 5, 1998
24	"Now! The Time of Decision and the Miracle Friendship"; Transliteration: "Ima! Ketchaku no Toki Kiseki no Yūjō" (Japanese: 今！決着の時奇跡の友情)	Toshiki Inoue	September 12, 1998
25	"A New Development – The Handsome Boy who Attacks"; Transliteration: "Aratanaru Tenkai Osō Bishōnen" (Japanese: 新たなる展開 襲う美少年)	Yasuko Kobayashi	September 26, 1998
26	"Clash of Rivals – The Greatest Pinch"; Transliteration: "Raibaru Gekitotsu – Saidai Pinchi" (Japanese: ライバル激突 最大ピンチ)	Toshiki Inoue	October 3, 1998
27	"Friendship – From Legend to Myth"; Transliteration: "Yūjō – Densetsu Kara Shinwa e" (Japanese: 友情 伝説から神話へ)	Toshiki Inoue	October 10, 1998

== Yu-Gi-Oh! Duel Monsters ==
=== Series overview ===
Season	Episodes	Originally released	
Season	Episodes	First released	Last released
1	49	April 18, 2000	April 3, 2001
2	48	April 10, 2001	March 5, 2002
3	47	March 12, 2002	February 11, 2003
4	40	February 18, 2003	December 17, 2003
5	40	December 24, 2003	September 29, 2004

=== Theme songs ===
==== Opening themes ====
Title	Vocalist	Episodes
Voice	CLOUD	1-48
Shuffle	Masami Okui	49–80
Wild Drive	Masato Nagai	81–131
Warriors	Yuichi Ikusawa	132–189
Overlap	Kimeru	190–224

The theme music for the U.S. version was composed by Wayne Sharpe and John Siegler.

==== Ending themes ====
Title	Vocalist	Episodes
Energizing Shower (元気のシャワー, Genki no Shawā)	Aki Maeda	1-48
The Afternoon of that Day (あの日の午後, Ano Hi no Gogo)	Masami Okui	49–80
Paradise (楽園, Rakuen)	CAVE	81–131
These Overflowing Feelings Don't Stop (あふれる感情がとまらない, Afureru Kanjō ga Tomaranai)	Yuichi Ikusawa	132–189
EYE'S	Yuichi Ikusawa	190–224

=== Season 1: Duelist Kingdom, Legendary Heroes, and Dungeon Dice Monsters (2000–01) ===
No. overall	No. in season	English dub title / Japanese translated title	Written by	Original release date	American air date
Duelist Kingdom
1	1	"The Heart of the Cards" / "The Bloodcurdling Blue-Eyes White Dragon"; Transliteration: "Senritsu no Burūaizu Howaito Doragon" (Japanese: 戦慄のブルーアイズ・ホワイト・ドラゴン)	Junki Takegami	April 18, 2000	September 29, 2001
2	2	"The Gauntlet Is Thrown" / "The Trap of Illusionist No Face"; Transliteration: "Iryūjonisuto No Feisu no Wana" (Japanese: 幻想師(イリュージョニスト)ノー・フェイスの罠)	Junki Takegami	April 25, 2000	October 6, 2001
3	3	"Journey to the Duelist Kingdom" / "The Lost Exodia"; Transliteration: "Ushinawareshi Ekuzodia" (Japanese: 失われしエクゾディア)	Masashi Sogo	May 2, 2000	October 13, 2001
4	4	"Into the Hornet's Nest" / "The Insector Combination"; Transliteration: "Insekutā Konbo" (Japanese: インセクターコンボ)	Shin Yoshida	May 9, 2000	October 20, 2001
5	5	"The Ultimate Great Moth" / "The Ultimate Perfect Appearance – Great Moth"; Transliteration: "Kyūkoku Kanzen Tai: Gurēto Mosu" (Japanese: 究極完全態 グレート・モス)	Shin Yoshida	May 16, 2000	October 20, 2001
6	6	"First Duel" / "The Beautiful Harpy Ladies"; Transliteration: "Kareinaru Hāpi Redi" (Japanese: 華麗なるハーピィ・レディ)	Junki Takegami	May 23, 2000	November 3, 2001
7	7	"Attack from the Deep" / "The Sea-God Leviathan"; Transliteration: "Kaishin Ribaiasan" (Japanese: 海神リバイアサン)	Masashi Sogo	May 30, 2000	November 10, 2001
8	8	"Everything's Relative" / "The Stolen Blue-Eyes White Dragon"; Transliteration: "Ubawareta Burūaizu Howaito Doragon" (Japanese: 奪われたブルーアイズ・ホワイト・ドラゴン)	Junki Takegami	June 6, 2000	November 17, 2001
9	9	"Duel with a Ghoul" / "Revival of the Dead! Magical Silk Hat"; Transliteration: "Kishi Kaisei! Majikaru Shiruku Hatto" (Japanese: 起死回生! マジカルシルクハット)	Masashi Sogo	June 13, 2000	November 24, 2001
10	10	"Give up the Ghost" / "Blue-Eyes White Dragon Strikes Back"; Transliteration: "Gyakushū no Burūaizu Howaito Doragon" (Japanese: 逆襲のブルーアイズ・ホワイト・ドラゴン)	Masashi Sogo	June 20, 2000	December 1, 2001
11	11	"The Dueling Monkey" / "Friendship Power! Barbarian #1 & #2"; Transliteration: "Yūjō Pawā Bābarian Ichi-go Ni-go" (Japanese: 友情パワー! バーバリアン1号・2号)	Shin Yoshida	June 27, 2000	December 15, 2001
12	12	"Trial by Red-Eyes" / "Black Flare! Red-Eyes Black Dragon"; Transliteration: "Kuroki Honō! Reddoaizu Burakku Doragon" (Japanese: 黒き炎! レッドアイズ・ブラックドラゴン)	Shin Yoshida	July 4, 2000	January 19, 2002
13	13	"Evil Spirit of the Ring" / "Trap of the Metamorpot! Flame Swordsman in Danger"; Transliteration: "Metamorupotto no Wana! Honō no Kenshi Ayaushi" (Japanese: メタモルポットの罠! 炎の剣士危うし)	Junki Takegami	July 11, 2000	January 26, 2002
14	14	"The Light at the End of the Tunnel" / "Pitch-Black Duel! The Castle Hidden in the Darkness"; Transliteration: "Shikkoku no Dyueru! Yami Kuramashi no Shiro" (Japanese: 漆黒のデュエル! 闇晦ましの城)	Masashi Sogo	July 25, 2000	February 2, 2002
15	15	"Winning Through Intimidation" / "Cut Through the Darkness! Sealing Swords of Light"; Transliteration: "Yami o Kirisake! Hikari no Gofūken" (Japanese: 闇を切り裂け! 光の護封剣(ごふうけん))	Masashi Sogo	August 1, 2000	February 2, 2002
16	16	"The Scars of Defeat" / "Clash! Blue-Eyes vs. Red-Eyes"; Transliteration: "Gekitotsu! Burūaizu VS Reddoaizu" (Japanese: 激突! ブルーアイズVSレッドアイズ)	Junki Takegami	August 8, 2000	February 9, 2002
17	17	"Arena of Lost Souls, Part 1" / "Terror! Call of the Living Dead"; Transliteration: "Kyōfu! Ribingu Deddo no Yobi Koe" (Japanese: 恐怖! リビングデッドの呼び声)	Shin Yoshida	August 15, 2000	February 16, 2002
18	18	"Arena of Lost Souls, Part 2" / "Shield in the Right Hand, Sword in the Left Hand"; Transliteration: "Migi Te ni Tate o Hidari Te ni Ken o" (Japanese: 右手に盾を左手に剣を)	Shin Yoshida	August 22, 2000	February 23, 2002
19	19	"Double Trouble Duel, Part 1" / "Tag Duel in the Labyrinth"; Transliteration: "Meikyū no Taggu Dyueru" (Japanese: 迷宮のタッグ・デュエル)	Masashi Sogo	August 29, 2000	March 16, 2002
20	20	"Double Trouble Duel, Part 2" / "Fusion of Three Gods! Gate Guardian"; Transliteration: "Mikami Gattai! Gēto GĀdian" (Japanese: 三神合体! ゲート・ガーディアン)	Masashi Sogo	September 9, 2000	March 23, 2002
21	21	"Double Trouble Duel, Part 3" / "Devil Dragon! Black Demons Dragon"; Transliteration: "Akuma Ryū! Burakku Dēmonzu Doragon" (Japanese: 悪魔竜! ブラック・デーモンズ・ドラゴン)	Masashi Sogo	September 12, 2000	March 30, 2002
22	22	"Face Off, Part 1" / "The Destined Duel! Yugi vs. Kaiba"; Transliteration: "Shukumei no Dyueru! Yūgi VS Kaiba" (Japanese: 宿命のデュエル! 遊戯VS海馬)	Junki Takegami	September 19, 2000	April 6, 2002
23	23	"Face Off, Part 2" / "Strongest! Splendid! Ultimate Dragon"; Transliteration: "Saikyō! Karei! Burūaizu Arutimetto Doragon" (Japanese: 最強! 華麗! 究極竜(ブルーアイズ・アルティメットドラゴン))	Junki Takegami	September 26, 2000	April 13, 2002
24	24	"Face Off, Part 3" / "Multiplying Kuriboh! The Shocking Conclusion"; Transliteration: "Kuribō Zōshoku! Kyōgaku no Ketsumatsu" (Japanese: クリボー増殖! 驚愕の結末)	Junki Takegami	October 3, 2000	April 20, 2002
25	25	"Shining Friendship" / "A Duel of Tears! Friendship"; Transliteration: "Namida no Dyueru! Furendoshippu" (Japanese: 涙のデュエル! フレンドシップ)	Masashi Sogo	October 10, 2000	April 27, 2002
26	26	"Champion vs. Creator, Part 1" / "Save Mokuba! Kaiba vs. Pegasus"; Transliteration: "Mokuba o Sukue! Kaiba VS Pegasasu" (Japanese: モクバを救え! 海馬VSペガサス)	Shin Yoshida	October 17, 2000	May 18, 2002
27	27	"Champion vs. Creator, Part 2" / "Kaiba Falters! The Invincible Toon World"; Transliteration: "Kaiba Chiru! Muteki no Tūn Wārudo" (Japanese: 海馬散る! 無敵のトゥーンワールド)	Shin Yoshida	October 24, 2000	May 25, 2002
28	28	"The Night Before" / "The Night Before the Finals! Pegasus's Secret"; Transliteration: "Kessen Senya! Pegasasu no Himitsu" (Japanese: 決戦前夜! ペガサスの秘密)	Masashi Sogo	October 31, 2000	August 17, 2002
29	29	"Duel Identity, Part 1" / "A Desperate Situation! Seductive Shadow"; Transliteration: "Zettai Zetsumei! Yūwaku no Shadō" (Japanese: 絶体絶命! 誘惑のシャドウ)	Shin Yoshida	November 7, 2000	August 24, 2002
30	30	"Duel Identity, Part 2" / "The Ultimate Legendary Soldier – Chaos Soldier Descends"; Transliteration: "Densetsu no Saikyō Kenshi: Kaosu Sorujā Kōrin" (Japanese: 伝説の最強戦士 カオス・ソルジャー降臨)	Shin Yoshida	November 14, 2000	August 31, 2002
31	31	"Keith's Machinations, Part 1" / "Cruel – Heavy Metal Deck"; Transliteration: "Kyōaku Hevi Metaru Dekki" (Japanese: 凶悪 重機械(ヘヴィメタル)デッキ)	Shin Yoshida	November 21, 2000	September 7, 2002
32	32	"Keith's Machinations, Part 2" / "Travel Through Time! Red-Eyes Black Metal Dragon"; Transliteration: "Toki o Koero! Reddoaizu Burakku Metaru Doragon" (Japanese: 時を超えろ! レッドアイズ・ブラックメタルドラゴン)	Shin Yoshida	November 28, 2000	September 7, 2002
33	33	"Best of Friends, Best of Duelists, Part 1" / "Final Game of Friendship! – Yugi vs. Jonouchi (Part 1)"; Transliteration: "Yūjō no Kesshōsen: Yūgi VS Jōnouchi (Zenpen)" (Japanese: 友情の決勝戦 遊戯VS城之内 (前編))	Masashi Sogo	December 5, 2000	September 14, 2002
34	34	"Best of Friends, Best of Duelists, Part 2" / "Final Game of Friendship! – Yugi vs. Jonouchi (Part 2)"; Transliteration: "Yūjō no Kesshōsen: Yūgi VS Jōnouchi (Kōhen)" (Japanese: 友情の決勝戦 遊戯VS城之内 (後編))	Masashi Sogo	December 12, 2000	September 14, 2002
35	35	"Yugi vs. Pegasus: Match of the Millennium, Part 1" / "Final Duel! Yugi vs. Pegasus"; Transliteration: "Fainaru Dyueru! Yūgi VS Pegasasu" (Japanese: 最終決闘(ファイナルデュエル)! 遊戯VSペガサス)	Junki Takegami	December 19, 2000	September 21, 2002
36	36	"Yugi vs. Pegasus: Match of the Millennium, Part 2" / "Attacks Ineffective!? The Invincible Toon Army"; Transliteration: "Kōryaku Funō!? Muteki no Tūn Gundan" (Japanese: 攻略不能!? 無敵のトゥーン軍団)	Junki Takegami	December 26, 2000	September 21, 2002
37	37	"Yugi vs. Pegasus: Match of the Millennium, Part 3" / "The Counterattack Begins! Mind Shuffle"; Transliteration: "Hangeki Kaishi! Maindo Shaffuru" (Japanese: 反撃開始! マインドシャッフル)	Junki Takegami	January 9, 2001	September 28, 2002
38	38	"Yugi vs. Pegasus: Match of the Millennium, Part 4" / "The Evil Eye Activates – Sacrifice"; Transliteration: "Jagan Hatsudō: Sakurifaisu" (Japanese: 邪眼発動 サクリファイス)	Junki Takegami	January 16, 2001	September 28, 2002
39	39	"Yugi vs. Pegasus: Match of the Millennium, Part 5" / "Fusion of Light and Darkness – Black Chaos Descends"; Transliteration: "Hikari to Yami no Yūgō: Burakku Kaosu Kōrin" (Japanese: 光と闇の融合 ブラックカオス降臨)	Junki Takegami	January 23, 2001	October 5, 2002
40	40	"Aftermath" / "King of Duelists"; Transliteration: "Kingu obu Dyuerisuto" (Japanese: キング オブ デュエリスト)	Junki Takegami	January 30, 2001	October 5, 2002
41	41	"The Wrath of Rebecca" / "The Girl from America"; Transliteration: "Amerika kara Kita Shōjo" (Japanese: アメリカからきた少女)	Masashi Sogo	February 6, 2001	October 12, 2002
42	42	"The Ties of Friendship" / "The All-Powerful Shadow Ghoul"; Transliteration: "Hissatsu no Shadō Gūru" (Japanese: 必殺のシャドーグール)	Masashi Sogo	February 13, 2001	October 12, 2002
Legendary Heroes
43	43	"Legendary Heroes, Part 1" / "Big 5's Trap – Duel Monsters Quest"; Transliteration: "Biggu Faibu no Wana: Dyueru Monsutāzu Kuesto" (Japanese: ビッグ5の罠 デュエルモンスターズクエスト)	Shin Yoshida	February 20, 2001	October 19, 2002
44	44	"Legendary Heroes, Part 2" / "DM Quest 2: The Legendary Hero – Yugi"; Transliteration: "DM Kuesuto 2: Densetsu no Yūsha – Yūgi" (Japanese: DMクエスト② 伝説の勇者 遊戯)	Shin Yoshida	February 27, 2001	October 19, 2002
45	45	"Legendary Heroes, Part 3" / "DM Quest 3: Master of Dragon Knight"; Transliteration: "DM Kuesuto 3: Masutā obu Doragon Naito" (Japanese: DMクエスト③ マスター・オブ・ドラゴンナイト)	Shin Yoshida	March 6, 2001	October 26, 2002
Dungeon Dice Monsters
46	46	"Dungeon Dice Monsters, Part 1" / "The Mysterious Transfer Student – Ryuji Otogi"; Transliteration: "Nazo no Tenkōsei: Otogi Ryūji" (Japanese: 謎の転校生 御伽龍児)	Junki Takegami	March 13, 2001	November 2, 2002
47	47	"Dungeon Dice Monsters, Part 2" / "Showdown! Dungeon Dice Monsters" (Japanese: 対決! ダンジョンダイスモンスターズ)	Junki Takegami	March 20, 2001	November 2, 2002
48	48	"Dungeon Dice Monsters, Part 3" / "Yugi's Tough Battle – God Orgoth's Fierce Assault"; Transliteration: "Yūgi Kusen: Goddo Ōgasu no Mōkō" (Japanese: 遊戯苦戦 ゴッドオーガスの猛攻)	Junki Takegami	March 27, 2001	November 9, 2002
49	49	"Dungeon Dice Monsters, Part 4" / "The Miracle Dimension – The Black Magician Is Summoned"; Transliteration: "Kiseki no Dimenshon: Burakku Majishan Shōkan" (Japanese: 奇跡のディメンジョン ブラックマジシャン召喚)	Junki Takegami	April 3, 2001	November 9, 2002

=== Season 2: Rulers of the Duel / Battle City Duels (2001–02) ===
No. overall	No. in season	Title	Written by	Original release date	American air date
50	1	"The Mystery Duelist, Part 1"; Transliteration: "Challenge from the Past — The Terrifying Zera" (Japanese: 過去からの挑戦 戦慄のゼラ)	Junki Takegami	April 10, 2001	November 16, 2002
51	2	"The Mystery Duelist, Part 2"; Transliteration: "The Shattered Millennium Puzzle" (Japanese: 砕かれた千年パズル)	Junki Takegami	April 17, 2001	November 16, 2002
52	3	"The Past is Present"; Transliteration: "The Pharaoh's Lost Memories" (Japanese: 失われた王(ファラオ)の記憶)	Masashi Sogo	April 24, 2001	November 23, 2002
53	4	"Steppin' Out"; Transliteration: "The Fiery Dance Battle" (Japanese: 炎のダンスバトル)	Junki Takegami	May 1, 2001	November 23, 2002
54	5	"Obelisk the Tormentor"; Transliteration: "This City Will Become Battle City!" (Japanese: この町は, バトルシティとなる!)	Shin Yoshida	May 8, 2001	November 30, 2002
55	6	"Stalked by the Rare Hunters"; Transliteration: "Ghouls Attacks — Red-Eyes Black Dragon Targeted" (Japanese: グールズ強襲 狙われた真紅目黒竜)	Shin Yoshida	May 8, 2001	December 14, 2002
56	7	"Yugi VS the Rare Hunter, Part 1"; Transliteration: "Clash! Battle City Begins" (Japanese: 激闘! バトルシティ開幕)	Shin Yoshida	May 15, 2001	January 11, 2003
57	8	"Yugi VS the Rare Hunter, Part 2"; Transliteration: "Reversal — Chain Destruction" (Japanese: 逆転 連鎖破壊(チェーンディストラクション))	Shin Yoshida	May 22, 2001	January 18, 2003
58	9	"Espa Roba — The ESP Duelist, Part 1"; Transliteration: "Esper Roba — Terror of the Psychic Deck" (Japanese: エスパー絽場 サイキックデッキの恐怖)	Atsushi Maekawa	May 29, 2001	January 25, 2003
59	10	"Espa Roba — The ESP Duelist, Part 2"; Transliteration: "Gamble of Courage — The Spinning Roulette Spider" (Japanese: 勇気ある賭け 廻れルーレットスパイダー)	Atsushi Maekawa	June 5, 2001	February 1, 2003
60	11	"The Master of Magicians, Part 1"; Transliteration: "The Black Magician Master — Pandora" (Japanese: ブラックマジシャン使い パンドラ)	Junki Takegami	June 19, 2001	February 8, 2003
61	12	"The Master of Magicians, Part 2"; Transliteration: "Black Magic of the Soul" (Japanese: 魂のブラックマジック)	Junki Takegami	June 26, 2001	February 8, 2003
62	13	"The Master of Magicians, Part 3"; Transliteration: "The Magician's Disciple — Black Magician Girl" (Japanese: 魔術師の弟子 ブラックマジシャンガール)	Junki Takegami	July 3, 2001	February 8, 2003
63	14	"Playing with a Parasite, Part 1"; Transliteration: "The Trap of Revenge — Rampage! Paraside" (Japanese: 復讐の罠 暴走! パラサイド)	Shin Yoshida	July 10, 2001	February 15, 2003
64	15	"Playing with a Parasite, Part 2"; Transliteration: "The Steel Knight — Gearfried" (Japanese: 鋼鉄の騎士 ギアフリード)	Shin Yoshida	July 17, 2001	February 22, 2003
65	16	"Mime Control, Part 1"; Transliteration: "Malik's Opening Play: The God Combo" (Japanese: マリク始動 神のコンボ)	Atsushi Maekawa	July 24, 2001	March 8, 2003
66	17	"Mime Control, Part 2"; Transliteration: "Osiris the Heaven Dragon Saint Dragon - The God of Osiris" (Japanese: オシリスの天空竜 SAINT DRAGON -THE GOD OF OSIRIS)	Atsushi Maekawa	July 31, 2001	March 8, 2003
67	18	"Mime Control, Part 3"; Transliteration: "Overcoming God! The Ultimate Infinite Loop!" (Japanese: 神を越えろ! 究極の無限ループ)	Atsushi Maekawa	August 7, 2001	March 15, 2003
68	19	"Legendary Fisherman, Part 1"; Transliteration: "Invisible Enemy — Sea Stealth II" (Japanese: 見えない敵 シーステルスII)	Shin Yoshida	August 14, 2001	March 22, 2003
69	20	"Legendary Fisherman, Part 2"; Transliteration: "The Legendary Fisherman" (Japanese: 伝説のフィッシャーマン)	Shin Yoshida	August 21, 2001	March 29, 2003
70	21	"Double Duel, Part 1"; Transliteration: "The Mask's Curse — The High Altitude Duel" (Japanese: 仮面の呪縛 高層デュエル)	Junki Takegami	August 28, 2001	May 3, 2003
71	22	"Double Duel, Part 2"; Transliteration: "Sealed God Cards" (Japanese: 封じられた神のカード)	Junki Takegami	September 4, 2001	May 10, 2003
72	23	"Double Duel, Part 3"; Transliteration: "Unite!" (Japanese: 結束せよ!)	Junki Takegami	September 11, 2001	May 17, 2003
73	24	"Double Duel, Part 4"; Transliteration: "The Giant God Soldier of Obelisk The God of Obelisk" (Japanese: オベリスクの巨神兵 THE GOD OF OBELISK)	Junki Takegami	September 18, 2001	May 24, 2003
74	25	"The Rescue"; Transliteration: "Bonds" (Japanese: 絆)	Junki Takegami	September 25, 2001	June 14, 2003
75	26	"Friends 'Til the End, Part 1"; Transliteration: "A Cruel Duel — Yugi Vs. Jonouchi" (Japanese: 非情の決闘(デュエル) 遊戯vs城之内)	Atsushi Maekawa	October 2, 2001	June 28, 2003
76	27	"Friends 'Til the End, Part 2"; Transliteration: "Awaken! Red-Eyes Black Dragon of Friendship" (Japanese: 届け!友情の真紅眼の黒竜(レッドアイズブラックドラゴン))	Atsushi Maekawa	October 9, 2001	July 5, 2003
77	28	"Friends 'Til the End, Part 3"; Transliteration: "The Countdown to Despair" (Japanese: 絶望へのカウントダウン)	Atsushi Maekawa	October 16, 2001	July 12, 2003
78	29	"Friends 'Til the End, Part 4"; Transliteration: "Attack Me! The Fated Last Turn" (Japanese: ボクを撃て!運命のラストターン)	Atsushi Maekawa	October 23, 2001	July 19, 2003
79	30	"Shadow of a Duel"; Transliteration: "Ghost Deck Vs. Occult Deck" (Japanese: ゴーストデッキvsオカルトデッキ)	Shin Yoshida	October 30, 2001	August 16, 2003
80	31	"Lights, Camera, Duel"; Transliteration: "Ninja Master Magnum Enters" (Japanese: 忍者使(ニンジャマスター)いマグナム見参)	Junki Takegami	November 6, 2001	August 23, 2003
81	32	"Let the Finals Begin!"; Transliteration: "Battle Ship Takes Off!" (Japanese: バトルシップ発進!)	Junki Takegami	November 13, 2001	August 30, 2003
82	33	"The Dark Spirit Revealed, Part 1"; Transliteration: "First Duel in the Sky — Yugi vs. Dark Bakura" (Japanese: 天空のファーストデュエル 遊戯vs闇の獏良)	Atsushi Maekawa	November 27, 2001	September 6, 2003
83	34	"The Dark Spirit Revealed, Part 2"; Transliteration: "The Death-Calling Ouija Board" (Japanese: 死を呼ぶウィジャ盤)	Atsushi Maekawa	November 27, 2001	September 13, 2003
84	35	"The Dark Spirit Revealed, Part 3"; Transliteration: "Smash the Darkness — God Attacks!" (Japanese: 闇を砕け 神の一撃!)	Atsushi Maekawa	November 27, 2001	September 13, 2003
85	36	"Rage of the Egyptian Gods"; Transliteration: "Hidden Power — The Purpose of the God Cards" (Japanese: 秘められた力 神のカードの謎)	Junki Takegami	December 4, 2001	September 20, 2003
86	37	"Awakening of Evil, Part 1"; Transliteration: "Jounouchi Vs the Trap Deck" (Japanese: 城之内vsトラップデッキ!)	Shin Yoshida	December 11, 2001	September 20, 2003
87	38	"Awakening of Evil, Part 2"; Transliteration: "The Spirit-Inheriting Card — Psycho Shocker Counterattacks!" (Japanese: 受け継ぎし魂(カード) サイコショッカー反撃!)	Shin Yoshida	December 18, 2001	September 27, 2003
88	39	"Awakening of Evil, Part 3"; Transliteration: "Summon the Winged Sun Dragon of Ra" (Japanese: ラーの翼神竜を召喚せよ)	Shin Yoshida	December 25, 2001	September 27, 2003
89	40	"Awakening of Evil, Part 4"; Transliteration: "Ra's Fury — Stand up Jonouchi!" (Japanese: ラーの怒り 立て! 城之内)	Shin Yoshida	January 8, 2002	October 4, 2003
90	41	"Mind Game, Part 1"; Transliteration: "Mai vs. Marik — A Dark Duel" (Japanese: 舞vsマリク 闇のデュエル)	Shin Yoshida	January 15, 2002	October 4, 2003
91	42	"Mind Game, Part 2"; Transliteration: "Capturing the God Card" (Japanese: 神のカードを奪え)	Shin Yoshida	January 22, 2002	October 11, 2003
92	43	"Mind Game, Part 3"; Transliteration: "Mystery of the Hieratic Text" (Japanese: 古代神官文字の謎)	Shin Yoshida	January 29, 2002	October 11, 2003
93	44	"A Duel with Destiny, Part 1"; Transliteration: "Kaiba Vs. The 8th Duelist" (Japanese: 海馬vs8人目のデュエリスト)	Tadashi Hayakawa	February 5, 2002	October 18, 2003
94	45	"A Duel with Destiny, Part 2"; Transliteration: "An Attack that Changes the Future" (Japanese: 未来を変える一撃)	Tadashi Hayakawa	February 12, 2002	October 18, 2003
95	46	"The Tomb-Keeper's Secret"; Transliteration: "The Truth of the Ishtar Family Revealed" (Japanese: 明かされるイシュタール家の真実)	Shin Yoshida	February 19, 2002	October 25, 2003
96	47	"Showdown in the Shadows, Part 1"; Transliteration: "Darkness Vs. Darkness" (Japanese: 闇 Vs. 闇)	Atsushi Maekawa	February 26, 2002	October 25, 2003
97	48	"Showdown in the Shadows, Part 2"; Transliteration: "One Turn Kill" (Japanese: ONE TURN KILL)	Atsushi Maekawa	March 5, 2002	November 1, 2003

=== Season 3: Noah's Saga and Enter the Shadow Realm (2002–03) ===
No. overall	No. in season	Title	Written by	Original release date	American air date
Noah's Saga
98	1	"A Virtual Nightmare!"; Transliteration: "The Unknown Challenger — The Giant Mobile Fortress Surfaces!" (Japanese: 未知なる挑戦者 巨大機動要塞浮上!)	Junki Takegami	March 12, 2002	November 1, 2003
99	2	"Isolated in Cyber Space — Part 1"; Transliteration: "Deck Master Deep Sea Warrior" (Japanese: デッキマスター 深海の戦士)	Tadashi Hayakawa, Junki Takegami	March 19, 2002	November 8, 2003
100	3	"Isolated in Cyber Space — Part 2"; Transliteration: "The Terrifying Regeneration Combo" (Japanese: 恐怖の再生コンボ)	Tadashi Hayakawa	March 26, 2002	November 8, 2003
101	4	"Isolated in Cyber Space — Part 3"; Transliteration: "The Rainbow Arch Strikes Back" (Japanese: 反撃のレインボーアーチ)	Tadashi Hayakawa	April 9, 2002	November 15, 2003
102	5	"Freeze Play — Part 1"; Transliteration: "Duel on Ice — Anzu Targeted" (Japanese: 氷上の決闘(デュエル) 狙われた杏子)	Shin Yoshida	April 16, 2002	November 15, 2003
103	6	"Freeze Play — Part 2"; Transliteration: "Shine! The Jewel of the Sage" (Japanese: 輝け! 賢者の宝石)	Shin Yoshida	April 23, 2002	November 22, 2003
104	7	"Courtroom Chaos — Part 1"; Transliteration: "Deck Master Judgeman's Judgement" (Japanese: デッキマスター ジャッジマンの裁き)	Atsushi Maekawa	April 30, 2002	November 22, 2003
105	8	"Courtroom Chaos — Part 2"; Transliteration: "Gamble to Victory" (Japanese: 勝利への賭け)	Atsushi Maekawa	May 7, 2002	November 29, 2003
106	9	"Mechanical Mayhem — Part 1"; Transliteration: "A Man's Path of Glory — Honda's Honorable Defeat" (Japanese: 男の花道 本田玉砕)	Tadashi Hayakawa	May 14, 2002	November 29, 2003
107	10	"Mechanical Mayhem — Part 2"; Transliteration: "Saint Jannu's Trinity Attack" (Japanese: 聖女ジャンヌ三位一体の攻撃)	Tadashi Hayakawa	May 21, 2002	December 6, 2003
108	11	"Settling the Score — Part 1"; Transliteration: "Kidnapped Mokuba — Kaiba vs. Psycho Shocker" (Japanese: さらわれたモクバ 海馬vsサイコショッカー)	Shin Yoshida	May 28, 2002	December 13, 2003
109	12	"Settling the Score — Part 2"; Transliteration: "Attacks from Outer Space — Satellite Cannon" (Japanese: 宇宙からの攻撃 サテライトキャノン)	Shin Yoshida	June 4, 2002	December 20, 2003
110	13	"Noah's Secret"; Transliteration: "The Deepening Mystery — Noah Kaiba" (Japanese: 深まる謎 乃亜の正体)	Junki Takegami	June 11, 2002	January 10, 2004
111	14	"Merger of the Big Five — Part 1"; Transliteration: "Big 5's Counterattack" (Japanese: ビッグ5の逆襲)	Atsushi Maekawa	June 18, 2002	January 17, 2004
112	15	"Merger of the Big Five — Part 2"; Transliteration: "Target: Jonouchi — The Teamwork Play to Victory" (Japanese: 狙われた城之内 勝利への連係プレー)	Atsushi Maekawa	June 25, 2002	January 24, 2004
113	16	"Merger of the Big Five — Part 3"; Transliteration: "Defeat it! Five-Headed Dragon" (Japanese: 倒せ! ファイブゴッドドラゴン)	Atsushi Maekawa	July 2, 2002	January 31, 2004
114	17	"Brothers in Arms — Part 1"; Transliteration: "Noa vs. Seto — The Duel of Heaven and Earth's Creation" (Japanese: 乃亜vs瀬人 天地創造の決闘)	Shin Yoshida	July 16, 2002	February 7, 2004
115	18	"Brothers in Arms — Part 2"; Transliteration: "The Invincible Deck Master — The Miracle Ark" (Japanese: 無敵デッキマスター 奇跡の箱舟)	Shin Yoshida	July 23, 2002	February 14, 2004
116	19	"Brothers in Arms — Part 3"; Transliteration: "Save Mokuba! The Seventh Turn of Fate" (Japanese: モクバを救え! 運命の第七ターン)	Shin Yoshida	July 30, 2002	February 21, 2004
117	20	"Noah's Final Threat — Part 1"; Transliteration: "Change of Decks — Yugi vs. Noa" (Japanese: 引き継ぎし山札 遊戯vs乃亜)	Shin Yoshida	August 6, 2002	February 28, 2004
118	21	"Noah's Final Threat — Part 2"; Transliteration: "LP(Life Point) 10000 vs. 100!!" (Japanese: LP(ライフポイント) 10000vs100!!)	Shin Yoshida	August 18, 2002	March 6, 2004
119	22	"So Close Yet So Far"; Transliteration: "Darkness of the Kaiba Family" (Japanese: 海馬家の闇)	Atsushi Maekawa	August 20, 2002	March 20, 2004
120	23	"Burying the Past — Part 1"; Transliteration: "Exodia Necross" (Japanese: エクゾディア·ネクロス)	Atsushi Maekawa	August 27, 2002	April 3, 2004
121	24	"Burying the Past — Part 2"; Transliteration: "Escape!!" (Japanese: 脱出!!)	Atsushi Maekawa	August 27, 2002	April 17, 2004
Enter the Shadow Realm
122	25	"Back to Battle City — Part 1"; Transliteration: "The Place of the Finals — Alcatraz" (Japanese: 決戦の地 アルカトラズ)	Akemi Omode	August 27, 2002	May 1, 2004
123	26	"Back to Battle City — Part 2"; Transliteration: "Battle Royale!" (Japanese: バトルロイヤル!)	Shin Yoshida	September 3, 2002	May 8, 2004
124	27	"Back to Battle City — Part 3"; Transliteration: "The Respective Opponents" (Japanese: それぞれの対戦者)	Yoshiki Sakurai, Atsushi Maekawa	September 3, 2002	May 15, 2004
125	28	"The Darkness Returns — Part 1"; Transliteration: "The Dark Semi-Final Duel — Jonouchi vs. Marik" (Japanese: 闇の準決勝 城之内vsマリク)	Akemi Omode	September 10, 2002	May 15, 2004
126	29	"The Darkness Returns — Part 2"; Transliteration: "The Hell Poet — Helpoemer" (Japanese: 地獄の詩人 ヘルポエマー)	Akihiko Inari	September 17, 2002	May 22, 2004
127	30	"The Darkness Returns — Part 3"; Transliteration: "The Turning of the Tide! Gilford the Lightning" (Japanese: 逆転! 稲妻の戦士(ギルフォード・ザ・ライトニング))	Atsushi Maekawa	September 24, 2002	May 22, 2004
128	31	"The Darkness Returns — Part 4"; Transliteration: "Jonouchi's Death" (Japanese: 城之内死す)	Atsushi Maekawa	October 8, 2002	May 29, 2004
129	32	"Clash in the Coliseum — Part 1"; Transliteration: "Tenkū Koroshiamu Yūgi vs Kaiba" (Japanese: 天空闘戯場(コロシアム) 遊戯vs海馬)	Akemi Omode	October 15, 2002	May 29, 2004
130	33	"Clash in the Coliseum — Part 2"; Transliteration: "The Three Knights Used to Call God" (Japanese: 神を喚(よ)ぶ三騎士)	Akemi Omode	October 22, 2002	June 5, 2004
131	34	"Clash in the Coliseum — Part 3"; Transliteration: "Clash! Osiris VS Obelisk" (Japanese: 激突! 神(オシリス)vs神(オベリスク))	Shin Yoshida	October 29, 2002	June 12, 2004
132	35	"Clash in the Coliseum — Part 4"; Transliteration: "The Inherited Destined Duel" (Japanese: 受け継ぎし運命の決闘(デュエル))	Shin Yoshida	November 5, 2002	June 19, 2004
133	36	"Clash in the Coliseum — Part 5"; Transliteration: "The Promise to a Friend — Red-Eyes Black Dragon" (Japanese: 友との誓い 真紅眼の黒竜(レッドアイズ ブラックドラゴン))	Atsushi Maekawa	November 12, 2002	June 26, 2004
134	37	"Clash in the Coliseum — Part 6"; Transliteration: "Destroy the Hatred! Black Paladin" (Japanese: 憎しみを撃て! ブラックパラディン)	Akihiko Inari	November 19, 2002	July 3, 2004
135	38	"Battle for the Bronze — Part 1"; Transliteration: "The Mediocre's Road to Flame — Jonouchi vs. Kaiba" (Japanese: 炎の凡骨(ばんけつ)ロード 城之内vs海馬)	Atsushi Maekawa	December 3, 2002	July 10, 2004
136	39	"Battle for the Bronze — Part 2"; Transliteration: "Burū-Aizu Howaito Doragon vs Burū-Aizu Howaito Doragon" (Japanese: 青眼の白龍(ブルーアイズ・ホワイトドラゴン)vs青眼の白龍(ブルーアイズ・ホワイトドラゴン))	Akemi Omode	December 10, 2002	July 17, 2004
137	40	"Battle for the Bronze — Part 3"; Transliteration: "The Path to Becoming a True Duelist" (Japanese: 真のデュエリストへの道)	Akemi Omode	December 17, 2002	July 24, 2004
138	41	"The Final Face Off — Part 1"; Transliteration: "The Final: Yugi vs Malik" (Japanese: 決勝戦(ファイナル) 遊戯vsマリク)	Akihiko Inari	December 24, 2002	July 31, 2004
139	42	"The Final Face Off — Part 2"; Transliteration: "Devil's Sanctuary Activates!" (Japanese: 悪魔の聖域(デビルズサンクチュアリ)発動!)	Akihiko Inari	January 7, 2003	August 14, 2004
140	43	"The Final Face Off — Part 3"; Transliteration: "Immortal Wall: God Slime" (Japanese: 不死の壁 ゴッドスライム)	Akemi Omode	January 14, 2003	August 21, 2004
141	44	"The Final Face Off — Part 4"; Transliteration: "Obelisk's Anger: Soul Energy—MAX)" (Japanese: オベリスクの怒り ソウルエナジーMAX)	Atsushi Maekawa	January 21, 2003	August 28, 2004
142	45	"The Final Face Off — Part 5"; Transliteration: "Battle City Ends!" (Japanese: バトルシティ終結!)	Akemi Omode	January 28, 2003	August 28, 2004
143	46	"One for the Road"; Transliteration: "The Destruction of Alcatraz" (Japanese: アルカトラズ炎上)	Atsushi Maekawa	February 4, 2003	September 4, 2004
144	47	"Looking Back and Moving Ahead"; Transliteration: "A Sign" (Japanese: 兆(きざし))	Atsushi Maekawa	February 11, 2003	September 4, 2004

=== Season 4: Waking the Dragons (2003) ===
No. overall	No. in season	Title	Written by	Original release date	American air date
145	1	"A New Evil – Part 1"; Transliteration: "The Pulsation of a New Darkness" (Japanese: 新たなる闇の鼓動)	Shin Yoshida	February 18, 2003	September 11, 2004
146	2	"A New Evil – Part 2"; Transliteration: "The Seal of Orichalcos" (Japanese: オレイカルコスの結界)	Shin Yoshida	February 25, 2003	September 18, 2004
147	3	"Legend of the Dragons"; Transliteration: "Nameless Dragon — Timaeus" (Japanese: 名もなき竜 ティマイオス)	Shin Yoshida	March 4, 2003	September 25, 2004
148	4	"The Creator Returns"; Transliteration: "The Invitation from Pegasus" (Japanese: ペガサスからの招待状)	Akemi Omode	March 11, 2003	October 2, 2004
149	5	"Deja Duel! – Part 1"; Transliteration: "The Nightmare of Toon World" (Japanese: トゥーンワールドの悪夢)	Akihiko Inari	March 18, 2003	October 9, 2004
150	6	"Deja Duel! – Part 2"; Transliteration: "Awaken! Critias" (Japanese: 目覚めよ! クリティウス)	Akihiko Inari	April 8, 2003	October 16, 2004
151	7	"An Unexpected Enemy"; Transliteration: "An Unexpected Enemy" (Japanese: 予期せぬ敵)	Atsushi Maekawa	April 15, 2003	October 23, 2004
152	8	"My Freaky Valentine – Part 1"; Transliteration: "Mai who Fell into Darkness" (Japanese: 闇に堕ちた舞)	Akemi Omode	April 22, 2003	October 23, 2004
153	9	"My Freaky Valentine – Part 2"; Transliteration: "Revive! The Third Dragon" (Japanese: よみがえれ! 第三の竜)	Akemi Omode	April 29, 2003	October 30, 2004
154	10	"My Freaky Valentine – Part 3"; Transliteration: "The Miracle of Hermos" (Japanese: ヘルモスの奇跡)	Akemi Omode, Yasuyuki Suzuki	May 6, 2003	October 30, 2004
155	11	"The Challenge"; Transliteration: "Target: Nameless Pharaoh" (Japanese: ターゲットは名もなき王(ファラオ))	Yasuyuki Suzuki	May 13, 2003	November 6, 2004
156	12	"Fate of the Pharaoh – Part 1"; Transliteration: "Yugi vs. Rafael — The Impregnable Guardian Deck" (Japanese: 遊戯vsラフェール 鉄壁のガーディアンデッキ)	Shin Yoshida	May 20, 2003	November 6, 2004
157	13	"Fate of the Pharaoh — Part 2"; Transliteration: "The Truth of Doma" (Japanese: ドーマの真実)	Shin Yoshida	May 27, 2003	November 13, 2004
158	14	"Fate of the Pharaoh – Part 3"; Transliteration: "The Darkness Within Yugi — Timaeus Disappears" (Japanese: 遊戯の中の闇 ティマイオス消滅)	Shin Yoshida	June 3, 2003	November 13, 2004
159	15	"Trial by Stone"; Transliteration: "A Taken Soul" (Japanese: 引きさかれた魂(ソウル))	Shin Yoshida	June 10, 2003	November 20, 2004
160	16	"On the Wrong Track – Part 1"; Transliteration: "The Runaway Train Duel" (Japanese: 暴走特急デュエル)	Atsushi Maekawa	June 24, 2003	November 20, 2004
161	17	"On the Wrong Track — Part 2"; Transliteration: "Power-Up Deck! Haga & Ryuzaki" (Japanese: パワーアップデッキ! 羽蛾&竜崎)	Atsushi Maekawa	June 24, 2003	November 27, 2004
162	18	"On the Wrong Track – Part 3"; Transliteration: "Timaiosu Hatsudō Sezu" (Japanese: ティマイオス発動せず)	Atsushi Maekawa	July 1, 2003	November 27, 2004
163	19	"Self Destruction"; Transliteration: "Confrontation! Two Yugis" (Japanese: 対決! 二人の遊戯)	Shin Yoshida	July 8, 2003	January 29, 2005
164	20	"Reliving the Past"; Transliteration: "Orichalcos Soldier" (Japanese: オレイカルコス•ソルジャー)	Shin Yoshida	July 22, 2003	January 29, 2005
165	21	"Deck of Armor"; Transliteration: "Valon Moves! The Mysterious Armor Deck" (Japanese: ヴァロン始動! 謎のアーマーデッキ)	Yasuyuki Suzuki	July 29, 2003	February 5, 2005
166	22	"Flight of Fear – Part 1"; Transliteration: "The Revenging Amelda — The Duel in Heaven" (Japanese: 復讐のアメルダ 大空中決闘)	Yasuyuki Suzuki	August 12, 2003	February 5, 2005
167	23	"Flight of Fear – Part 2"; Transliteration: "Sky Fortress Ziggurat" (Japanese: 天空の要塞 ジグラート)	Yasuyuki Suzuki	August 19, 2003	February 12, 2005
168	24	"Paradise Found"; Transliteration: "The Shadow of Dartz Creeps Near" (Japanese: 忍びよるダーツの影)	Shin Yoshida	August 19, 2003	February 12, 2005
169	25	"Fighting for a Friend – Part 1"; Transliteration: "Clash! Jonouchi vs. Valon" (Japanese: 激突! 城之内vsヴァロン)	Akemi Omode	September 2, 2003	February 19, 2005
170	26	"Fighting for a Friend – Part 2"; Transliteration: "Fullarmor Gravitation" (Japanese: フルアーマー•グラビテーション)	Akemi Omode	September 9, 2003	February 19, 2005
171	27	"Fighting for a Friend – Part 3"; Transliteration: "Reverberating Soul" (Japanese: 響きあう魂)	Akemi Omode	September 16, 2003	February 26, 2005
172	28	"Fighting for a Friend — Part 4"; Transliteration: "The End of the Fierce Battle" (Japanese: 激闘の果てに)	Akemi Omode	September 23, 2003	February 26, 2005
173	29	"Fighting for a Friend – Part 5"; Transliteration: "A Bitter Victory" (Japanese: 苦い勝利)	Akemi Omode	October 1, 2003	April 16, 2005
174	30	"Grappling with a Guardian – Part 1"; Transliteration: "The Duel of Destiny! Yugi vs. Rafael" (Japanese: 運命の決闘(デュエル)! 遊戯vsラフェール!)	Yasuyuki Suzuki	October 8, 2003	April 23, 2005
175	31	"Grappling with a Guardian – Part 2"; Transliteration: "Invincible! Guardian Deathscythe" (Japanese: 不死身! ガーディアン•デスサイス)	Yasuyuki Suzuki	October 15, 2003	April 30, 2005
176	32	"Grappling with a Guardian – Part 3"; Transliteration: "Destroy the Darkness of the Heart!" (Japanese: 心の闇を撃て!)	Yasuyuki Suzuki	October 22, 2003	April 30, 2005
177	33	"A Duel with Dartz – Part 1"; Transliteration: "To the Place of the Final Battle! Dartz vs. Yugi and Kaiba" (Japanese: 戦の地へ! ダーツvs遊戯&海馬)	Shin Yoshida	October 29, 2003	May 7, 2005
178	34	"A Duel with Dartz – Part 2"; Transliteration: "The Tragedy of Atlantis" (Japanese: アトランティスの悲劇)	Shin Yoshida	November 5, 2003	May 7, 2005
179	35	"A Duel with Dartz – Part 3"; Transliteration: "The Captive Mirror Knights" (Japanese: 囚われのミラーナイト)	Shin Yoshida	November 12, 2003	May 14, 2005
180	36	"A Duel with Dartz – Part 4"; Transliteration: "The Third Seal of Orichalcos" (Japanese: オレイカルコスの三重結界)	Shin Yoshida	November 19, 2003	May 14, 2005
181	37	"A Duel with Dartz – Part 5"; Transliteration: "Revive! The Three Legendary Knights" (Japanese: よみがえれ! 伝説の三騎士)	Shin Yoshida	November 26, 2003	May 21, 2005
182	38	"A Duel with Dartz – Part 6"; Transliteration: "Infinite Attack Power — Serpent God Ge" (Japanese: ∞(むげんだい)攻撃(じゃしん)力 蛇神ゲー)	Shin Yoshida	December 3, 2003	May 21, 2005
183	39	"Rise of the Great Beast – Part 1"; Transliteration: "Battle of the Gods" (Japanese: 神神の戦い)	Shin Yoshida	December 10, 2003	May 28, 2005
184	40	"Rise of the Great Beast – Part 2"; Transliteration: "Walk into the Light" (Japanese: 光の中を歩め)	Shin Yoshida	December 17, 2003	May 28, 2005

=== Season 5: Grand Championship and Dawn of the Duel (2003–04) ===
No. overall	No. in season	Title	Written by	Original release date	American air date
KC Grand Championship
185	1	"Unwanted Guest, Part 1"; Transliteration: "KC Grand Prix Opens" (Japanese: KCグランプリ開幕)	Akemi Omode	December 24, 2003	August 27, 2005
186	2	"Unwanted Guest, Part 2"; Transliteration: "The Start of a Conspiracy" (Japanese: 動きだした陰謀)	Akemi Omode	January 7, 2004	August 27, 2005
187	3	"Let the Games Begin!, Part 1"; Transliteration: "Jonouchi vs. Mask the Rock" (Japanese: 城之内vsマスク·ザ·ロック)	Yasuyuki Suzuki	January 14, 2004	September 3, 2005
188	4	"Let the Games Begin!, Part 2"; Transliteration: "The Illusionary Ancient Dragon" (Japanese: 幻の古代竜(エンシェント・ドラゴン))	Yasuyuki Suzuki	January 21, 2004	September 3, 2005
189	5	"Child's Play"; Transliteration: "Hot Battle! Rebecca vs. Vivian" (Japanese: 熱闘! レベッカvsヴィヴィアン)	Akemi Omode	January 28, 2004	September 10, 2005
190	6	"Down in Flames, Part 1"; Transliteration: "Jonouchi vs. Sieg — A Beautiful Duel" (Japanese: 城之内vsジーク 華麗なる決闘(デュエル))	Akemi Omode	February 4, 2004	September 10, 2005
191	7	"Down in Flames, Part 2"; Transliteration: "The Goddesses of Monster Extermination" (Japanese: モンスター抹殺の女神)	Akemi Omode	February 11, 2004	September 17, 2005
192	8	"A Brawl in a Small Town, Part 1"; Transliteration: "Genius Girl(Rebecca) vs. Genius Boy(Leon)" (Japanese: 天才少女(レベッカ)vs天才少年(レオン))	Yasuyuki Suzuki	February 18, 2004	September 17, 2005
193	9	"A Brawl in a Small Town, Part 2"; Transliteration: "Leon in Fairyland" (Japanese: おとぎの国のレオン)	Yasuyuki Suzuki	February 25, 2004	September 24, 2005
194	10	"One Step Ahead, Part 1"; Transliteration: "Kaiba Intrudes! The Grand Prix Final" (Japanese: 海馬乱入! グランプリ決勝戦)	Yasuyuki Suzuki	March 3, 2004	September 24, 2005
195	11	"One Step Ahead, Part 2"; Transliteration: "Walkure vs. Blue Eyes White Dragon" (Japanese: 戦女神(ワルキューレ)vs青眼の白龍(ブルーアイズ・ホワイトドラゴン))	Yasuyuki Suzuki	March 10, 2004	October 1, 2005
196	12	"Sinister Secrets, Part 1"; Transliteration: "The Final Battle for Duel King — Yugi vs. Leon" (Japanese: デュエルキング決定戦 遊戯vsレオン)	Akemi Omode	March 17, 2004	October 1, 2005
197	13	"Sinister Secrets, Part 2"; Transliteration: "The Gold Castle of Stromberg" (Japanese: シュトロームベルクの金の城)	Akemi Omode	March 24, 2004	October 8, 2005
198	14	"Sinister Secrets, Part 3"; Transliteration: "KC Grand Prix Ends" (Japanese: KCグランプリ終結)	Akemi Omode	March 31, 2004	October 8, 2005
Dawn of the Duel
199	15	"Tomb of the Nameless Pharaoh"; Transliteration: "Ultimate Game" (Japanese: 究極のゲーム)	Shin Yoshida	April 7, 2004	October 15, 2005
200	16	"Spiritual Awakening"; Transliteration: "The Dark Bakura on the Move" (Japanese: 動きだした闇のバクラ)	Shin Yoshida	April 14, 2004	October 22, 2005
201	17	"Memoirs of a Pharaoh"; Transliteration: "The Door of Memory Opens" (Japanese: 開かれた記憶の扉)	Shin Yoshida	April 21, 2004	October 29, 2005
202	18	"The Intruder, Part 1"; Transliteration: "Thief King Bakura Enters!" (Japanese: 盗賊王バクラ見参!)	Shin Yoshida	April 28, 2004	November 5, 2005
203	19	"The Intruder, Part 2"; Transliteration: "Mahado's Decision" (Japanese: マハードの決意)	Yasuyuki Suzuki	May 5, 2004	November 12, 2005
204	20	"Makings of a Magician"; Transliteration: "Battle to the Death! Mahad vs. Bakura" (Japanese: 死闘! マハードvsバクラ)	Yasuyuki Suzuki	May 12, 2004	November 19, 2005
205	21	"Birth of the Blue-Eyes"; Transliteration: "Blue-Eyed Kisara" (Japanese: 青い瞳のキサラ)	Shin Yoshida	May 19, 2004	November 26, 2005
206	22	"Village of Lost Souls"; Transliteration: "The Secret of the Creation of the Millennium Items" (Japanese: 千年アイテム誕生の秘密)	Shin Yoshida	May 26, 2004	December 3, 2005
207	23	"A Reversal of Fortune"; Transliteration: "Wound Back Time" (Japanese: 巻き戻る時間)	Atsushi Maekawa	June 2, 2004	December 10, 2005
208	24	"In Search of a King"; Transliteration: "The Pharaoh is Alive" (Japanese: 生きていたファラオ)	Yasuyuki Suzuki	June 9, 2004	December 17, 2005
209	25	"Village of Vengeance, Part 1"; Transliteration: "Village of Dead Spirits" (Japanese: 死霊の村)	Akemi Omode	June 16, 2004	January 7, 2006
210	26	"Village of Vengeance, Part 2"; Transliteration: "The End of Thief King Bakura" (Japanese: 盗賊王バクラの最期)	Shin Yoshida	June 23, 2004	January 14, 2006
211	27	"Village of Vengeance, Part 3"; Transliteration: "A New Stage" (Japanese: 新たなるステージ)	Atsushi Maekawa	June 30, 2004	January 21, 2006
212	28	"Village of Vengeance, Part 4"; Transliteration: "The Dark High Priest" (Japanese: 闇の大神官)	Yasuyuki Suzuki	July 7, 2004	January 28, 2006
213	29	"Village of Vengeance, Part 5"; Transliteration: "The Countdown to the Evil God Revival" (Japanese: 邪神復活へのカウントダウン)	Akemi Omode	July 14, 2004	February 4, 2006
214	30	"Name of the Game"; Transliteration: "White Dragon" (Japanese: 白き龍)	Shin Yoshida	July 21, 2004	April 1, 2006
215	31	"The Dark One Cometh, Part 1"; Transliteration: "The Great Evil God Zorc Revives" (Japanese: 大邪神ゾーク復活)	Atsushi Maekawa	July 28, 2004	April 8, 2006
216	32	"The Dark One Cometh, Part 2"; Transliteration: "The Legendary Guardian God — Exodia Revives!" (Japanese: 伝説の守護神 エクゾディア復活!)	Akemi Omode	August 4, 2004	April 15, 2006
217	33	"The Dark One Cometh, Part 3"; Transliteration: "Summon! The Three Gods" (Japanese: 召喚! 三幻神)	Yasuyuki Suzuki	August 11, 2004	April 22, 2006
218	34	"The Dark One Cometh, Part 4"; Transliteration: "Zorc vs. Blue Eyes Ultimate Dragon" (Japanese: ゾークvs青眼の白龍(ブルーアイズ・ホワイトドラゴン))	Shin Yoshida	August 18, 2004	April 29, 2006
219	35	"In the Name of the Pharaoh!"; Transliteration: "In the Name of the Pharaoh!!" (Japanese: 王(ファラオ)の名のもとに!!)	Atsushi Maekawa	August 25, 2004	May 6, 2006
220	36	"The Final Journey"; Transliteration: "The Final Test" (Japanese: 最後の試練)	Akemi Omode	September 1, 2004	May 13, 2006
221	37	"The Final Duel, Part 1"; Transliteration: "The Last Duel of Destiny" (Japanese: 運命のラストデュエル)	Yasuyuki Suzuki	September 8, 2004	May 20, 2006
222	38	"The Final Duel, Part 2"; Transliteration: "Defeat the Three Gods" (Japanese: 三幻神を倒せ!)	Shin Yoshida	September 15, 2004	May 27, 2006
223	39	"The Final Duel, Part 3"; Transliteration: "Strong Heart — Tender Heart" (Japanese: 強き心 優しき心)	Shin Yoshida	September 22, 2004	June 3, 2006
224	40	"The Final Duel, Part 4"; Transliteration: "The Story That Concludes in Light" (Japanese: 光の中へ完結する物語)	Shin Yoshida	September 29, 2004	June 10, 2006

== Yu-Gi-Oh! Capsule Monsters ==
No.	Title	Original release date
1	"Getting Played"	September 9, 2006
2	"Divide and Conquer"	September 16, 2006
3	"Reunited at Last"	September 23, 2006
4	"Fortress of Fear"	September 30, 2006
5	"Eye of the Storm"	October 7, 2006
6	"Trial of Light and Shadow"	October 14, 2006
7	"Red-Eyes Black Curse"	October 21, 2006
8	"Fruits of Evolution"	October 28, 2006
9	"The Fiendish Five, Part 1"	November 4, 2006
10	"The Fiendish Five, Part 2"	November 11, 2006
11	"The True King, Part 1"	November 18, 2006
12	"The True King, Part 2"	November 25, 2006

== Movies ==
No.	Title	Original release date	American air date
1	"Yu-Gi-Oh!"; Transliteration: "Yu-Gi-Ō!" (Japanese: 遊☆戯☆王)	March 6, 1999	N/A
This was a 30-minute movie produced by Toei Animation in Japan. The movie is about a boy named Shougo Aoyama, who is too timid to duel, even after he got a powerful rare card in his deck, the legendary Red-Eyes Black Dragon. Yugi tries to bring Shougo's courage out in a duel with Seto Kaiba, who has his eyes on Shougo's rare card. This movie is based on the 1998 anime series.
2	"Yu-Gi-Oh! The Movie: Pyramid of Light"; Transliteration: "Yu-Gi-Oh! Duel Monsters: Pyramid of Light" (Japanese: 遊戯王デュエルモンスターズ 光のピラミッド)	November 3, 2004	August 13, 2004
In the movie, the evil sorcerer Anubis wants revenge on Yami Yugi, having been defeated by him long ago, and awakens after Yugi Muto solves the Millennium Puzzle. The evil sorcerer possesses the cards Andro Sphinx and Sphinx Teleia, which can be merged into Theinen the Great Sphinx. He also possesses the Pyramid of Light, a corrupted version of the Millennium Puzzle, which also has a card version. His plans to obtain his revenge by using Kaiba to defeat Yami Yugi, in order to completely revive as the King of Destruction and annihilate mankind. This movie is based on the Duel Monsters anime series, and is also set after the Battle City arc.
3	"Yu-Gi-Oh! Bonds Beyond Time / 10th Anniversary Yu-Gi-Oh! Movie: Super Fusion! Bonds That Transcended Time"; Transliteration: "Tensu Anivāsarī Gekijōban Yū☆Gi☆Ō ~Chō Yūgō! Toki o Koeta Kizuna~ 10th Anniversary" (Japanese: 10thアニバーサリー 劇場版 遊☆戯☆王 ～超融合！時空を越えた絆～)	January 23, 2010	February 26, 2011
In the movie, Yusei Fudo of New Domino City has his ace monster, Stardust Dragon, stolen by a mysterious man, Paradox, who has come from the future. Paradox plans to erase the creation of Duel Monsters by disposing of Maximillion Pegasus in the past. Yusei goes through a time slip and reaches Jaden Yuki, one capable of using the power of Card Spirits. In pursuit of Paradox, Yusei and Jaden travel to the times of the legendary duelist, Yugi Muto. They meet with him and make an agreement to combine their powers to fight. To stop Paradox's plans and retrieve Stardust Dragon, Yugi, Jaden, and Yusei's grand duel with Paradox unfolds. This movie is based on the Duel Monsters anime series and its first two spin-offs, Yu-Gi-Oh! GX and Yu-Gi-Oh! 5D's.
4	"Yu-Gi-Oh! The Dark Side of Dimensions"; Transliteration: "Yū☆Gi☆Ō Za Dākusaido Obu Dimenshonzu" (Japanese: 遊☆戯☆王 THE DARK SIDE OF DIMENSIONS)	April 23, 2016	January 27, 2017
A new threat arises when the Millennium Items are unearthed. Kaiba, obsessed with defeating Pharaoh Atem in a rematch, gathers the pieces of the Millennium Puzzle, planning to reassemble it. Aigami shows up with the Quantum Cube and steals two of the pieces. Kaiba reclaims one, but he must get the other by defeating Yugi. Yugi and Kaiba duel, with Yugi completing the Millennium Puzzle midway through after Kaiba refuses to believe Atem's soul is no longer in the Puzzle. Their duel is interrupted by Aigami who has been engulfed by the Millennium Ring's evil, as it was unearthed along with the Puzzle. Yugi and Kaiba team up to defeat him, with Pharaoh Atem's spirit eventually showing up to win the duel. The defeat returns Aigami to normal and destroys the Millennium Ring. Later, Kaiba uses the Quantum Cube to duel Pharaoh Atem in the afterlife. This film takes place after the events of the original manga series and Transcend Game, respectively.
