= PBJ =

A PB&J is a peanut butter and jelly sandwich, popular in North America.

PBJ or PB&J may also refer to:

== Television ==
- PBJ (TV network), a 2011–2016 children's television network in the United States
- PB&J Television, a production company based in Santa Monica, California, USA
- PB & J (Brooklyn Nine-Nine), S8 E5, 2021

== Music ==
- Peanut Butter Jelly (song), 2015 single by Galantis
- Peter Bjorn and John, a Swedish indie pop band

== Other uses ==
- Probation before judgment, the name for deferred adjudication in Maryland
- Patrick Baldwin Jr., an American-born professional basketball player

== See also ==
- PBJ-1, US Navy variant of the B-25 Mitchell bomber
- PB&J Otter, 1998–2000 kids' television program
- Peanut Butter Jelly Time, 2001 song by the Buckwheat Boyz
