= Seto Kaiba =

Yu-Gi-Oh character

- Yu-Gi-Oh! character
- Seto Kaiba as illustrated by Kazuki Takahashi alongside his Blue-Eyes White Dragon
- First appearance: Yu-Gi-Oh! chapter 9
- Created by: Kazuki Takahashi
- Voiced by: Japanese: Hikaru Midorikawa (first series); Kenjiro Tsuda (second series); Kiyomi Yazaki (second series, younger); English: Eric Stuart

In-universe information
- Family: Younger brother: Mokuba Kaiba; Adoptive father: Gozaburo Kaiba; Adoptive brother: Noah Kaiba (second series only)

Seto Kaiba (Japanese: 海馬 瀬人, Hepburn: Kaiba Seto) is a fictional character in the manga Yu-Gi-Oh! by Kazuki Takahashi. As the majority shareholder and CEO of his own multi-national gaming company, Kaiba Corporation, Kaiba is reputed to be Japan's greatest gamer and aims to become the world's greatest player of the fictional card game, Duel Monsters (Magic & Wizards in the Japanese manga). In all media, his arch-rival is the protagonist of the series, Yugi Mutou. He is the modern-day counterpart of one of Pharaoh Atem's Six High Priests, "Priest Seto", who appears in the manga's final arc. Kaiba has also appeared in related anime and feature films. His signature monster is the Blue-Eyes White Dragon.

Seto Kaiba originates from one of the stories Takahashi heard from a friend involving a selfish card collector. Like the card collector, Kaiba is obsessed with gaming, but Takahashi also gave Kaiba a calmer demeanor when developing his relationship with his rival. He was first voiced by Hikaru Midorikawa in Japanese, with Kenjirō Tsuda replacing him in the second anime adaptation, Duel Monsters. Eric Stuart voiced him in all of his English appearances.

Critical reception to Kaiba has been mixed; he has been compared to simplistic anime rivals based on his multiple attempts to defeat Yugi and become the superior Duel Monsters player. While his development in the film Dark Side of Dimensions was praised for being a major focus in the narrative, critics still felt Kaiba's obsession with Duel Monsters and focus on his original goal made him come across as a one-dimensional character.

== Creation and development ==
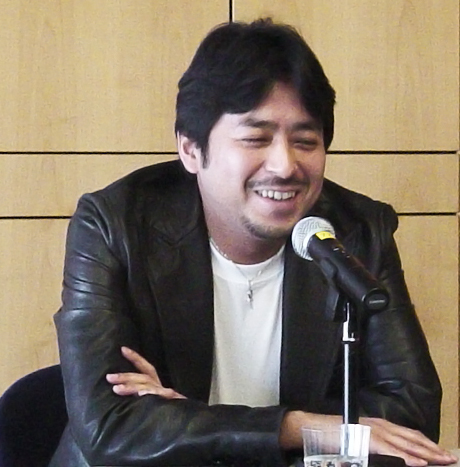
Manga author Kazuki Takahashi

Seto Kaiba originates from stories Kazuki Takahashi's friend told him. According to one of these stories, there was a person who played trading cards and asked another person to play with them; however, this person was unwilling to play with him because he was not an expert. Displeased upon hearing about this person, Takahashi decided to use them as inspiration for a manga character, resulting in Kaiba's creation.

In the making of the series, Takahashi wanted to create an appealing creature for his Duel Monster fight with Yugi Mutou. This creature was named the "Blue-Eyes White Dragon", as he wanted it "to evoke a feeling that would allow readers to conjure up its colors". This later led to the creation of Kisara for the series' final arc and the reveal of her origins being connected with Kaiba.

According to Takahashi, while Yugi and Kaiba are rivals, they are not close friends. He believes, however, the most important part of their relationship is before Yugi's duel against Marik's alter-ego. Before the game begins, Kaiba passes Yugi a card that could help him in the game. This scene felt like one of the most difficult scenes to write because of the pair's rivalry.

According to Takahashi, the feelings of "Priest Seto" (神官セト, Shinkan Seto) for Kisara are the basis behind Kaiba's modern-day obsession with the Blue Eyes White Dragon.

Takahashi views Kaiba as Yugi's archnemesis and thus considers Yugi a highly important character because, without him, Kaiba would not have a reason to exist.

In the second Japanese anime adaptation of the Yu-Gi-Oh series, Kaiba is voiced by Kenjiro Tsuda. Tsuda expressed a dislike towards his character, as he would not befriend him; according to him "I definitely don't want to become friends with him. I don't think anyone really does". He also added that if he ever met Kaiba, he would say "Glad to see you're doing well" and "I'm always in your care." Nevertheless, he regarded Kaiba as both a "strong" and "unique" character on his own.

English voice actor Eric Stuart felt he was connected to Kaiba. He noted that most fans tend to view him as a villain, but he instead views him as a rival, stating that Kaiba's role is to strengthen Yugi's skills. However, he noted that for the film Dark Side of Dimensions, Kaiba has changed since his introduction due to his obsession with wealth and power, and so he wanted to give him an edge in his personality. Nevertheless, he views Kaiba's characterization as consistent.

== Appearances ==
=== In the Yu-Gi-Oh! manga ===
In his introduction, Kaiba discovers that the grandfather of his classmate, Yugi Mutou, owns the rare Blue-Eyes White Dragon card, and takes it from him. Dark Yugi emerges from within Yugi's Millennium Puzzle to challenge Kaiba to a Shadow Game to reclaim it. Kaiba is ultimately defeated, suffering Dark Yugi's Penalty Game: Experience of Death (死の体感, Shi no Taikan). Afterward, he plots to take revenge against Yugi and acquires the other three Blue-Eyes White Dragon cards through extortion and blackmail and builds "Death T," a "theme park" made up of deadly games designed to kill Yugi and his friends. He defeats Sugoroku and tears up his Blue-Eyes White Dragon; he also subjects him to an artificial Penalty Game, forcing Yugi to participate in Death-T or else he will kill him. Yugi once again defeats him and uses the power of his Millennium Puzzle to subject Kaiba to a Penalty Game, leaving him in a coma.

Later on, Duel Monsters creator and Millennium Eye wielder Maximillion Pegasus schemes to take control of Kaiba Corporation (海馬コーポレイション, Kaiba Kōporeishon) from Seto by conspiring with its board of directors, the Big Five, and abducting his brother Mokuba. After Kaiba awakens from his coma, he learns of Pegasus' plans and his kidnapping of Mokuba and travels to Duelist Kingdom, where he regains his deck and briefly battles Katsuya Jonouchi (Joey Wheeler in English versions of the Duel Monsters anime). Kaiba and Yugi later play the game atop the castle parapets, and Kaiba is nearly defeated until he endangers his life by balancing on the edge of the turret. Dark Yugi nearly kills Kaiba, but Yugi forces him to forfeit the game so Kaiba is not killed. Kaiba goes on to duel Pegasus, but is overcome by the power of his Millennium Eye and is defeated. Pegasus gives Kaiba the Mind Card Penalty Game, sealing his soul into a card; when Dark Yugi defeats Pegasus in a Shadow Game during the final round of the tournament, both Kaiba and his brother are freed from their Penalty Games.

In the Battle City arc, Kaiba is summoned to the Domino City museum by Egyptologist Ishizu Ishtar, where he is shown an ancient stone tablet that depicts a battle between what appears to be his past self and the Pharaoh. He is interested in her tale of the God Cards – three powerful one-of-a-kind cards that Pegasus had entrusted to her. However, two of them were stolen by her brother Marik and his Ghouls organization, and she gives the third – God of Obelisk – to Kaiba, encouraging him to hold a tournament to lure in Marik and his organization. Seeking to obtain the remaining two God Cards for himself and eliminate Marik and his organization, Kaiba agrees and begins his "Battle City" competition. During the tournament, Kaiba teams up with Dark Yugi to rescue Mokuba and Yugi's friends from Marik's clutches. Afterward, Yugi, Kaiba and Jonouchi enter the finals, unaware that Marik has made a deal with Dark Bakura, and he, along with Marik and Marik's stepbrother Rishid, are registered as well. Kaiba trumps Ishizu's prophecy of defeat and claims victory. Kaiba faces Yugi in the semifinals, and the two unleash their God Cards against the other. Yugi manages to defeat Kaiba and go on to the final battle against Dark Marik. Kaiba gives Yugi the card Fiend Sanctuary prior to the duel, and with it, Yugi is able to hold off the attacks of Dark Marik's Sun Dragon Ra and defeat him in his Shadow Game.

=== In the Duel Monsters anime ===
Shortly after his return from the Duelist Kingdom, the Big Five attempt to appease an outraged Kaiba by revealing they have finalized his virtual reality game software, and invite him to test it out for himself. However, this is actually an attempt to eliminate Kaiba, but Yugi and his friends manage to rescue him. The Big Five log into the virtual world in an attempt to stop them from escaping, but they are defeated in a duel and their minds become trapped in the virtual reality program. Some time later, in the midst of the Battle City tournament, the Big Five's digital consciousnesses are discovered stranded in cyberspace by a mysterious boy named Noah, who recruits them for a revenge campaign against Kaiba. Noah admits to being Gozaburo Kaiba's biological son, and claims his mind exists as a computer program after he was fatally wounded as a child and later digitized. After Noah is defeated, Gozaburo reveals himself to be alive inside the Virtual World and sets a series of orbital missiles to launch and destroy the world. While Kaiba stops Gozaburo, a reformed Noah reprograms one of the satellites to attack the main computer database and helps Yugi and his friends escape.

In Season 4 of the anime, Kaiba, along with Joey and Yugi, is one of three duelists chosen to fight the brainwashed Atlantean King Dartz. During the season, Kaiba meets Alister, a man whose brother and parents were kidnapped by KaibaCorp-owned military forces under Gozaburo's command, though Gozaburo is actually Dartz in disguise. During the arc, Kaiba flips out upon learning Yugi lost to a duelist other than himself. Kaiba and Dark Yugi eventually duel Dartz, and although Kaiba loses, Dark Yugi defeats Dartz and Kaiba is restored, taking part in the battle against the Great Leviathan.

In the first half of season 5, KaibaCorp's stock prices are at an all-time low as a result of a failed takeover by Dartz, and when Kaiba hosts a tournament to restore the company's reputation, Zigfried von Schroeder (Kaiba's arch rival and enemy) infiltrates it and hacks Kaiba's computer systems. Upon catching Zigfried, Kaiba dispatches him in a duel. However, Zigfried has his brother Leon duel Yugi in the finals. During the duel, Zigfried tricks Leon into activating Golden Castle of Stromberg, releasing a computer virus into Kaiba's system and forcing Leon to attack, thus forcing his hand. However, Yugi prevails while Kaiba, who anticipated such a plan, had his computer systems backed up.

Kaiba's only appearance in the original manga version of the Millennium World arc is in the last chapter. Although he does not take part in the Shadow RPG during the Millennium World arc of the manga, in the anime, Yami Bakura gives him the Millennium Eye, which begins to show him visions and convinces him to fly to Egypt to determine if they are real or not. During the final battle, he is able to hold his ground against Zorc. In the original Japanese anime, Kaiba eventually acknowledges his past and the events that occurred within the Memory World Shadow RPG.

=== Yu-Gi-Oh! (1999 film) ===
Kaiba is the main antagonist of the Yu-Gi-Oh! movie, which was produced by Toei Animation in 1999. In this film, he learns about Shougo Aoyama's Red-Eyes Black Dragon and organizes a tournament where strong duelists are invited and attendance is mandatory. Shougo and Yugi are later pursued by Kaiba's henchmen from KaibaCorp, with Kaiba's henchmen overpowering them and stealing Yugi's Millennium Puzzle. Yugi enters Kaiba's tournament to show Shougo that one can have both the potential and the power to become a true Duelist. After the game, Kaiba tells Yugi that their battle is not over yet and informs him he is the only one in the world worth fighting as he leaves the arena.

=== Yu-Gi-Oh! The Movie: The Pyramid of Light ===
Kaiba appears in Yu-Gi-Oh! The Movie: The Pyramid of Light. In the wake of his defeat at the Battle City Tournament, he begins to suggest a means of defeating the three Egyptian God Cards that Yugi now holds to defeat him and reclaim his title as world champion. His quest leads him to Pegasus, as he theorized that he would not have created the Egyptian God Cards without creating a means of destroying them. After wagering his three Blue-Eyes White Dragons against the card that Pegasus promised him, Kaiba succeeds in winning their duel, only to find two cards within Pegasus's deck that could accomplish what he sought. Kaiba challenges Yugi to yet another duel in his Duel Dome, and puts the first of the two cards into play – the enigmatic "Pyramid of Light," which prevents the Egyptian God Cards from participating in the battle. As the duel proceeds, however, it is revealed that Kaiba had been used as a puppet for the ancient Egyptian sorcerer, Anubis, who placed the Pyramid of Light card in Pegasus's deck. The Pyramid's powers drain the lifeforce of Yugi and Kaiba as the duel progresses, eventually resurrecting Anubis, who dispatches Kaiba and takes his place in the duel. With Kaiba's aid, however, Yugi puts the second mighty card into play – the "Blue-Eyes Shining Dragon", which is able to destroy any card in play. The Shining Dragon destroys the Pyramid of Light and later wipes out Anubis.

=== Yu-Gi-Oh! The Dark Side of Dimensions ===
Kaiba appears in Yu-Gi-Oh! The Dark Side of Dimensions, in which he commissions an excavation to retrieve the disassembled Millennium Puzzle from the ruins of the Millennium chamber. The item had previously housed the spirit of his longtime rival, Pharaoh Atem, whom he hopes to "return to life" in order to settle their ancient score. The excavation is interrupted by Diva, who faces Kaiba in a game of Duel Monsters and steals two pieces of the recovered Puzzle. He keeps one fragment and gives the other to his younger sister Sera, who passes it on to Yugi, as he is the only one who can reassemble the Puzzle, having been the host of Atem. Kaiba has a computer that rebuilds the Millennium Puzzle and discovers the last two pieces are missing. He abducts Diva and approaches Yugi so he can have the two partake in the showcasing of his updated Duel Disk virtual reality technology. He intends to duel both Diva and Yugi, while gambling their pieces of the puzzle. However, Yugi is furious with Diva over what he did to Bakura and insists he duel him instead, which Kaiba agrees to. Yugi defeats Diva, resulting in Bakura's return to reality, and while dueling Kaiba, he re-completes the Millennium Puzzle, revealing that the spirit of Atem is no longer inside it. Diva becomes corrupted by the evil powers of the Millennium Ring, and duels both Yugi and Kaiba. Kaiba sacrifices himself during the Duel and makes a final plea for Yugi to call forth Atem. Yugi succeeds in doing so, and he and Atem defeat Diva. Atem and the Millennium Puzzle then fade away, and Kaiba and everyone else return to reality. The film concludes with Kaiba using his technology in conjunction with the Quantum Cube to transport his own consciousness to the afterlife and face Atem.

=== Appearances in other media ===
Though not seen much in the Yu-Gi-Oh! GX series, Kaiba is mentioned as the owner and founder of Duel Academy (Duel Academia), who named the dormitories personally. He also appears in flashbacks, once when Jaden remembers a competition he entered that was held by KaibaCorp and when a reporter sneaks into Duel Academy. The Duel Spirit Kaibaman also appears. He also appears physically, the first time being when he makes a bet on his ownership of the school; he also appears when Sartorius visits him to request the use of his Kaiba Land amusement park. Kaiba has not made any appearances since, though it has been shown that he is the only surviving citizen of Trueman's invasion in Domino City. The Kaiba Dome is seen often in Yu-Gi-Oh! 5D's. His company Kaiba Corp is responsible for turning Domino City into New Domino City.

Kaiba appears in the Yu-Gi-Oh! R manga to stop the Tenma Brothers from taking over Kaiba Corp, as part of their plan to try and avenge Pegasus by defeating Yugi, using the Wicked God Cards.

Kaiba also appears in some of the Yu-Gi-Oh! video games as an opponent which the player can duel against or play as, as well as the crossover Jump Force.

== Reception ==
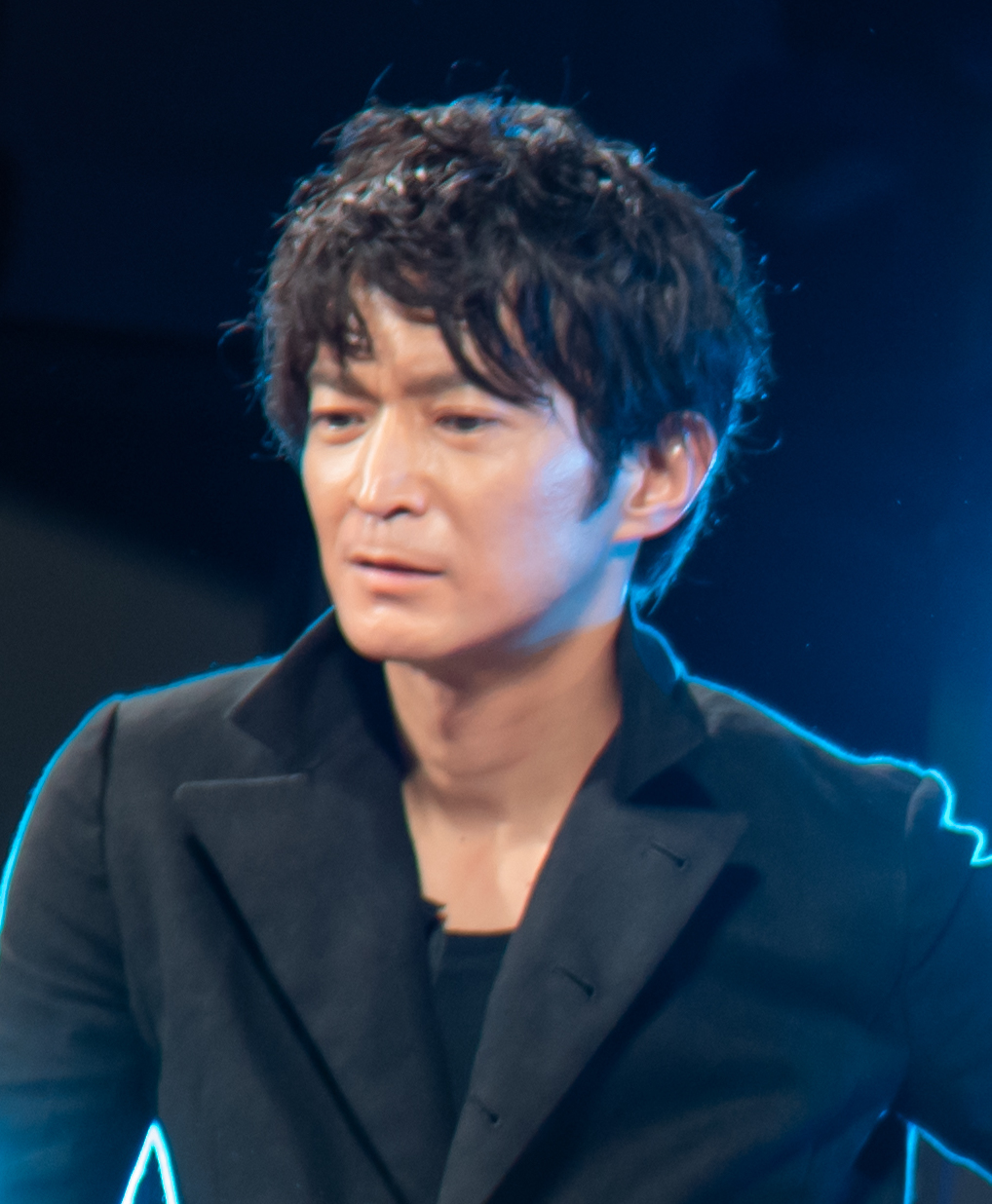
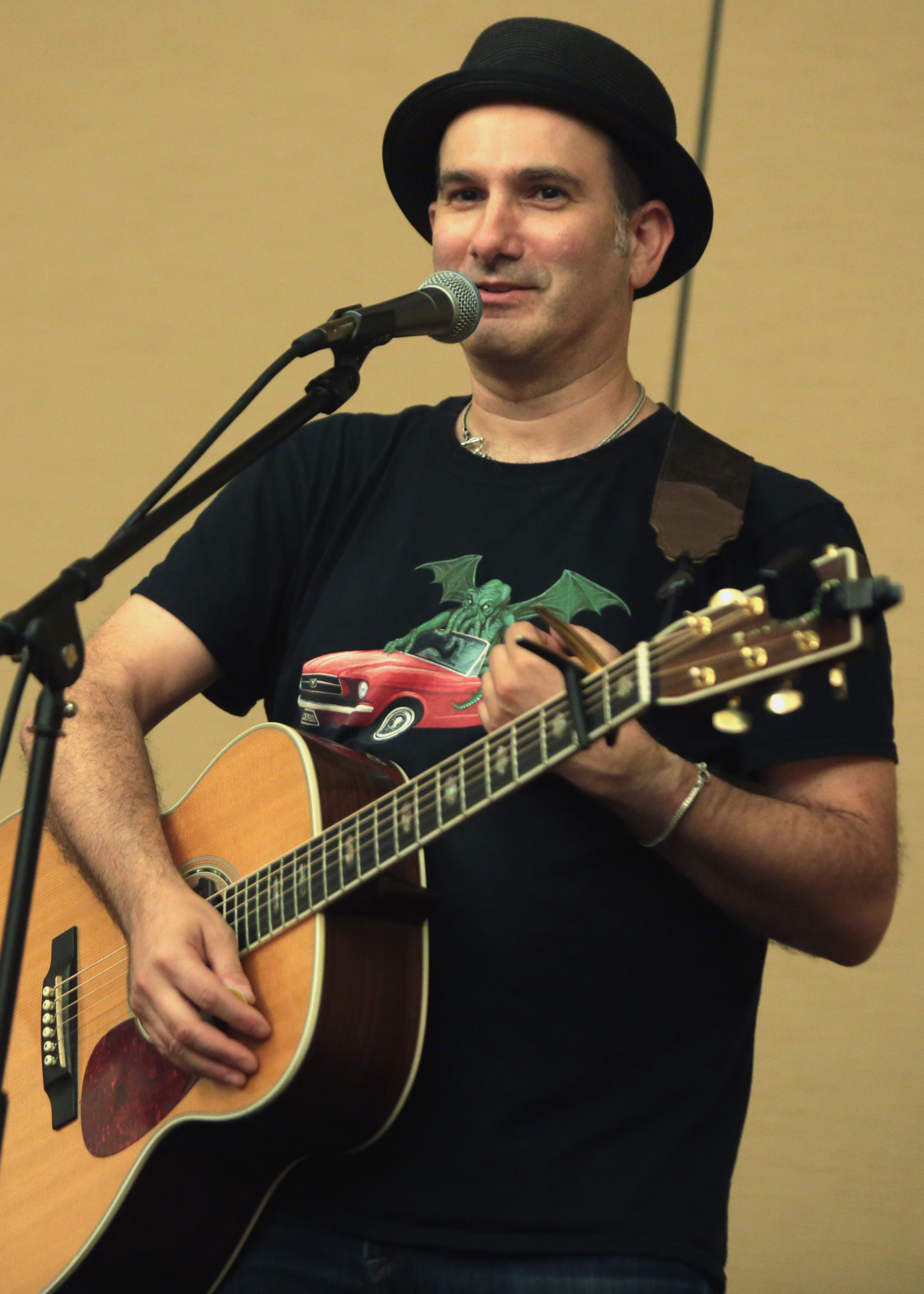
The performances of Kenjiro Tsuda (left) and Eric Stuart (right) were the subject of praise

Critical reception to Kaiba has been mixed. DVD Talk describes Kaiba as an unlikely ally to Yugi, but saw his defeat in the third story arc as predictable. For the fourth season, the reviewer described Kaiba as one of the last heroes. Dan Green and Eric Stuart's voice talents were praised, though their deliveries were subject to negative response. THEM Anime Reviews criticized Kaiba, comparing him with another rival, Vegeta, as both possess simplistic characterizations due to their obsession with the leads. Anime News Network described him as a stereotypical manga rival while pointing out the actions he takes to be the best Duel Monster gamer. Although ANN mocked the multiple duels between Kaiba and Yugi, ANN praised the balance between their cards as done by Kazuki Takahashi. Manga News described him as too cold-hearted a character in the manga's initial chapter; however, the writer noted that he changes in the narrative after being defeated by Yugi and briefly sent into a coma. Chris Homer from The Fandom Post praised Kaiba's actions in the final arc as he joins Dark Yugi in his fight against Bakura and Zorc in Ancient Egypt while dealing with the life of his predecessor, "Priest Seto".

The duels between Kaiba and Yugi in Pyramid of Light were made fun of by DVD Talk for being a method of creating new cards to be bought by the audience. While reviewing Dark Side of Dimensions, IGN praised Yugi's growth alongside his friends' as they interact, making them more mature than in the manga and anime. IGN, however, wrote that although Yugi appears to be the movie's main character, he is overshadowed by Kaiba. Anime News Network labelled him as "still everyone's favorite egoistic lunatic", as there was no progress in regards to his lack of character arc. The Fandom Post criticized the obsessive relationship between Kaiba and the Pharaoh, which came across as romantic. However, the regular Yugi's rivalry with Kaiba received a positive response. Richard Eisenbeis from Kotaku reviewed the movie favorably, finding Kaiba to be the most important character in the plot, but criticized Kaiba's personality for his obsession with Yugi, wanting to face the late Dark Yugi as he does not see Yugi as a worthy opponent. Nevertheless, he finds that thanks to Kaiba, the movie is able to deliver an interesting narrative, despite finding the new characters lacking in appeal. Anime UK News found Kaiba's actions inconsistent but praised the deliveries of his Japanese voice actor, Kenjiro Tsuda, which he described as "overdramatic echoing". Although Atomix praised the film's focus on Kaiba, it found his obsession with facing Dark Yugi exaggerated and lamented the narrative did not focus on other prominent members of the cast. Blu-ray panned Kaiba's characterization for his actions in regards to a rematch with Yami as being repetitive due to the scenario having been done before.
