= Yu-Gi-Oh! (1998 TV series) =

Japanese anime television series

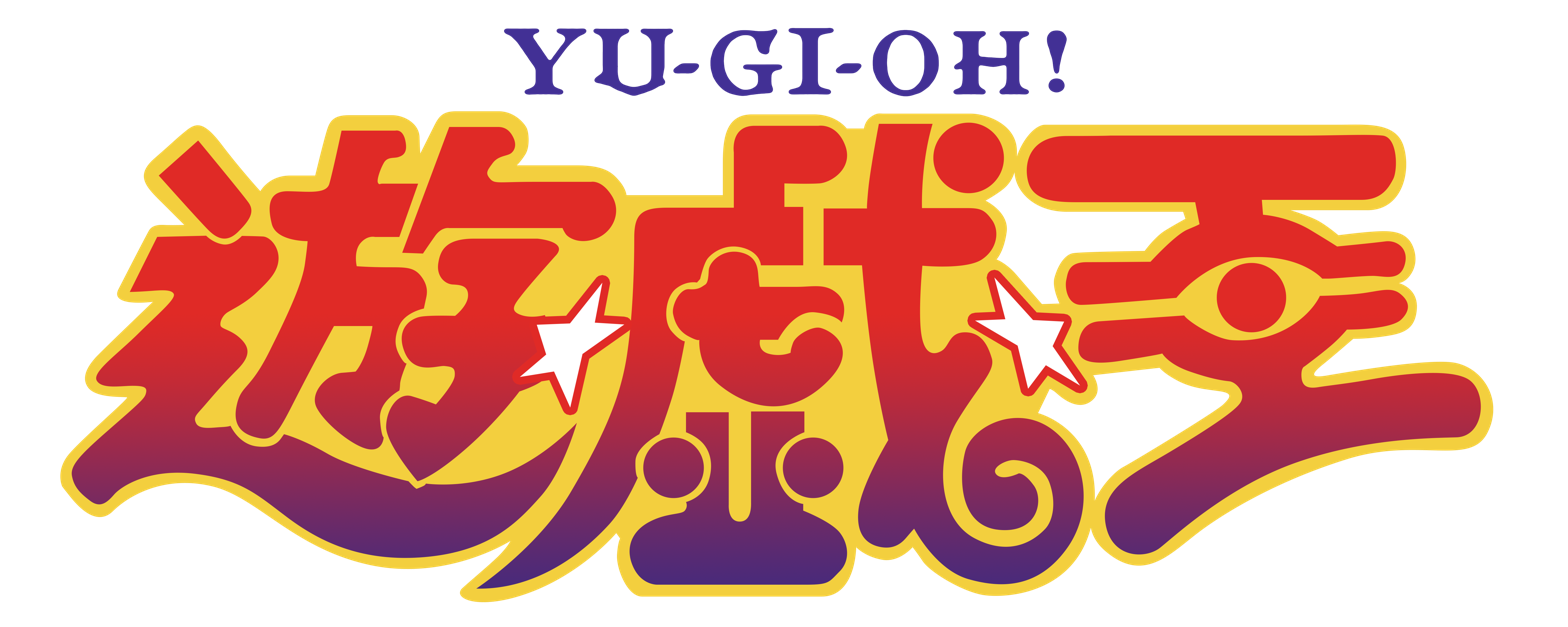
- 遊☆戯☆王
- Genre: Adventure; Fantasy
- Based on: Yu-Gi-Oh! by Kazuki Takahashi
- Developed by: Toshiki Inoue
- Directed by: Hiroyuki Kakudō
- Music by: BMF
- Country of origin: Japan
- Original language: Japanese
- No. of episodes: 27 (list of episodes)

Production
- Producers: Jun Kaji (TV Asahi); Tetsuya Watanabe (Dentsu); Nobuta Nishizawa
- Production companies: TV Asahi; Toei Animation

Original release
- Network: ANN (TV Asahi)
- Release: April 4 – October 10, 1998

Related
- Yu-Gi-Oh! (1999 film)
- Other series
- List of all Yu-Gi-Oh! series; Yu-Gi-Oh! R

Yu-Gi-Oh! is a 1998 Japanese anime television series produced by Toei Animation, based on the manga series of the same name written and illustrated by Kazuki Takahashi. It is the first animated adaptation of the manga and was directed by Hiroyuki Kakudō. Like the manga, this series is centered on Yugi Mutou, who becomes host to an ancient gambling spirit after solving the Millennium Puzzle. This series loosely adapts the first 59 chapters of the manga while adding several original events and characters; fans commonly refer to it as "Season 0" to distinguish it from the later Yu-Gi-Oh! Duel Monsters.

The series was broadcast on TV Asahi from April 4, 1998, to October 10, 1998, and was followed by a theatrical short film released on March 6, 1999. The opening theme is "A Dry Yell" (渇いた叫び, Kawaita Sakebi) by Field of View while the ending theme is "Even If You Were to Break Tomorrow" (明日もし君が壊れても, Ashita Moshi Kimi ga Kowaretemo) by Wands.

== Characters ==
The Toei series made Miho Nosaka, a minor character in the manga, into a main character.

== Episode list ==
No.	Title	Written by	Original release date
1	"Furious Battle – A Dark Game"; Transliteration: "Gekiretsu Batoru – Yami no Gēmu" (Japanese: 激烈バトル 闇のゲーム)	Toshiki Inoue	April 4, 1998
A shy and meek young boy named Yugi Mutou is a student at Domino City High School, who is bullied by his classmate Katsuya Jonouchi. The hall monitor, Tetsu Ushio, forcibly becomes Yugi's bodyguard, beating up Jonouchi and Hiroto Honda, and then says that Yugi owes him money. Ushio later beats up Yugi for failing to pay up, but Jonouchi and Honda try to intervene, only to be beaten up as well. One day, Yugi solves the Millennium Puzzle after working on it for eight years, heralding the return of the Dark Games. In the process, he unknowingly changes his own life forever by releasing a dark alter-ego named "Yami Yugi", who challenges Ushio to a Dark Game. Ushio loses after a failed attempt to cheat, and Yami Yugi inflicts a Penalty Game upon him, which results in Ushio being subjected to an illusion where he's eaten alive by monsters. Afterwards, Yugi, Honda and Jonouchu become lifelong friends, with Yugi's childhood friend, Anzu Mazaki, and Honda's crush, Miho Nosaka, also joining the group.
2	"The Devil Gamer – The Trap of Hell"; Transliteration: "Akuma Gēmā – Jigoku no Wana" (Japanese: 悪魔ゲーマー 地獄の罠)	Toshiki Inoue	April 11, 1998
A criminal escapes from jail, disguises himself and gets a job at the restaurant Burger World. When his true identity is exposed, he holds the restaurant and the people inside hostage, including Yugi, Honda, Jonouchi and Miho, while also taking Anzu as his prisoner. When the criminal slaps Anzu for trying to warn Yugi, Yami Yugi emerges and wastes no time in challenging the criminal to a Dark Game with Anzu's life at stake. The game this time is that the two contestants are allowed to choose one finger to use. As soon as the game begins, they can do whatever they wish with it, the criminal chooses his trigger finger to fire his revolver, but is outsmarted when Yami Yugi uses his thumb to ignite a lighter, which he then puts on the criminal's hand, so that if he tries to fire, the lighter will cause the Russian vodka he is about to consume to go up in flames. However, the criminal decides to cheat and uses his other hand to remove the lighter before attempting to shoot Yami Yugi dead. As punishment, Yami Yugi subjects him to a Penalty Game, causing the criminal to hallucinate that he is being engulfed in flames. As a result, Anzu develops a crush on the man who saved her, unaware that it was Yugi's alter-ego.
3	"Clash! The Strongest Monster"; Transliteration: "Gekitotsu! Saikyō no Monsutā" (Japanese: 激突！最強のモンスター)	Yasuko Kobayashi	April 18, 1998
Seto Kaiba, a new student in Yugi's class, is a Duel Monsters expert and the head of a company known as Kaiba Corporation. After he steals the rare Blue-Eyes White Dragon card from Yugi's grandfather, Yami Yugi challenges Kaiba to a duel where the monsters from the cards are real. The game ends in a tie, and Yugi gets his grandpa's card back.
4	"Theft! The Legendary Super Rare Watch"; Transliteration: "Gōdatsu! Chō Maboroshi no Geki Rea Tokei" (Japanese: 強奪！超幻の激レア時計)	Kenichi Kanemaki	April 25, 1998
Honda buys a watch for Miho, and he gets lucky as he manages to get the last one in stock. When a guy that obsessively collects watches sees that there aren't any more watches, he steals the watch from Honda, who in turn gets slapped by an angry Miho. Yugi follows and gets beaten up as he attempts to reclaim the watch. However, as the thief tries to leave, Yami Yugi emerges and promptly challenges him to a Dark Game for the watch. The thief loses and Yugi returns the watch to Miho. As punishment, the thief is subjected to a Penalty Game where he is turned into a living clock with watches embedded in his entire body and subsequently goes insane.
5	"Now Revealed!! Yugi's Secret"; Transliteration: "Ima Abakareru!! Yūgi no Himitsu" (Japanese: 今暴かれる！！遊戯の秘密)	Toshiki Inoue	May 2, 1998
A man from Egypt comes to the Domino City Museum, where he sees Yugi with the Millennium Puzzle. He travels into Yugi's mind to see if the puzzle really belongs to Yugi. In there, the man from Egypt is challenged by Yami Yugi to a Dark Game where he must find his "Soul Room". The man from Egypt loses and he tells Yugi that he really is the owner of the Millennium Puzzle. He also reveals his name to be Shadi.
6	"Desperate Situation!! The Passionate Battle of Friendship."; Transliteration: "Zettai Zetsumei!! Atsuki Yūjō Kessen" (Japanese: 絶体絶命！！熱き友情決戦)	Toshiki Inoue	May 9, 1998
Shadi, the man from Egypt, attacks Professor Yoshimori and hospitalizes him. He then infiltrates Anzu's soul room in order to force Yami Yugi into a Dark Game where, if he loses, Anzu will die.
7	"The Underhanded Digital Pet Rebellion"; Transliteration: "Urawaza Dejitaru Petto Sōdō" (Japanese: 裏技デジタルペット騒動)	Yasuko Kobayashi	May 16, 1998
The popularity of Digital Pets leads to a contest, and Honda trains Miho's pet so they can go on holiday to Australia together. Meanwhile, Yugi is worried for his friend Haiyama, who seems to be pressured into some shady business by the bullying Kujirada. However, Haiyama turns out to have been controlling Kujirada all along by giving him money. Yami Yugi plays a Dark Game with Haiyama involving their Digital Pets and wins, subjecting him to a Penalty Game where he's devoured by his own Digital Pet.
8	"The Four Game Masters Finally Move Out"; Transliteration: "Gēmu Shitennō Tsuini Ugoku" (Japanese: ゲーム四天王ついに動く)	Kenichi Kanemaki	May 23, 1998
Yugi is kidnapped by Kaiba and forced to duel the first of his four Game Masters, Count Ridley Sheldon, who has a strange obsession with dolls. Can Yugi defeat his doll monsters?
9	"Explosion – The Ultimate Secret Yo-Yo Technique"; Transliteration: "Sakuretsu – Yō-Yō Kyūkyoku no Higi" (Japanese: 炸裂 ヨーヨー究極の秘技)	Toshiki Inoue	May 30, 1998
The gang is concerned and confused when they see Jonouchi with a gang wielding yo-yos as weapons. Has he turned his back on his friends for good?
10	"The Pressing Beautiful Teacher – The Secret Mask"; Transliteration: "Semaru Bijin Kyōshi – Himitsu no Kari" (Japanese: 迫る美人教師 秘密の仮)	Katsuhiko Chiba	June 6, 1998
Anzu clashes with the beautiful but strict Ms. Chono, and organizes a petition to change the school rules. But Chono's underhanded counterattack threatens to ruin the petition, forcing Yami Yugi to step in and ensure that Chono gets what she deserves.
11	"The Rumored Capmon – It's a New Arrival"; Transliteration: "Uwasa no Kapumon – Shin Tōjō da ze" (Japanese: 噂のカプモン 新登場だぜ)	Yasuko Kobayashi	June 13, 1998
A college student named Warashibe is obsessed with Capsule Monsters and Miho. When she spurns his advances, Warashibe decides to eliminate her friends – his competition for her affection. Warashibe promptly poisons Anzu, Jonouchi and Honda with tainted water, causing the three teenagers to fall ill during class and forcing them to be sent to the Nurse's office for treatment. An enraged Miho confronts Warashibe, but he outsmarts her by challenging her to a game of Capsule Monster Chess, which Miho has no idea how to play. Yami Yugi steps in to help Miho and challenges Warashibe to a Dark Game where the Capsule Monsters are brought to life. Will he be able to end Warashibe's unhealthy obsession with Miho once and for all?
12	"The Extremely Lucky Enemy – The Invincible Legend"; Transliteration: "Kyōun wo Yobu Teki – Fuhai no Shinwa" (Japanese: 強運を呼ぶ敵 不敗の神話)	Toshiki Inoue	June 20, 1998
Game show champion Ryuichi Fuwa (Kaiba's second Game Master) moves to Domino City and starts attending Domino City High, ending up in the same class as Yugi and the gang. Although he seems friendly, Ryuichi's tactics for summoning Yami Yugi soon turn dangerous...
13	"Target the Schoolgirls – The Fangs of Great Prophecies"; Transliteration: "Onna Seito wo Nerau – Dai Yogen no Kiba" (Japanese: 女生徒を狙う 大予言の牙)	Yasuko Kobayashi	June 27, 1998
The fraudulent psychic Kokurano has his eyes set on Anzu. Though Anzu does not believe his predictions at first, her desire to see her mysterious savior leads her right into Kokurano's grasp. Yami Yugi challenges him to a Dark Game and defeats him, exposing Kokurano as a fraud. The episode ends with Anzu discovering a burn mark on Yugi's hand, causing her to realize that Yugi saved her (since both Yugi and his alter-ego share the same body).
14	"A Bomb Game Makes for the Worst Date"; Transliteration: "Bakuha Gēmu de Saiaku Dēto" (Japanese: 爆破ゲームで最悪デート)	Katsuhiko Chiba	July 4, 1998
When Anzu realizes that Yugi is her mysterious crush, she invites him on a date to an amusement park, intending to put herself in "danger" so she can see his alter-ego. However, she soon finds herself in real danger when a mad bomber challenges Yami Yugi to a twisted game with the lives of many innocent people on the line.
15	"Scary Woman!! Unable to Transform"; Transliteration: "Kowai Onna!! Henshin Dekinai" (Japanese: 怖〜い女！！変身できない)	Toshiki Inoue	July 11, 1998
A new girl named Risa Kageyama wants Yugi's rare Violet Hecate card and tries to get to it by pretending to be Yugi's girlfriend, much to Anzu's anger.
16	"Turnabout by a Hair's Breadth – The White-Robed Crisis"; Transliteration: "Ippatsu Gyakuten – Hakui no Kiki" (Japanese: イッパツ逆転 白衣の危機)	Yasuko Kobayashi	July 18, 1998
Jonouchi has a crush on Miyuki, who is the nurse taking care of his ill sister, Shizuka. But when a corrupt doctor who is more interested in playing golf than caring for the well-being of his own patients fires her for rejecting his advances, Jonouchi is forced to keep his mouth shut, because if he talks, Shizuka will be kicked out of the hospital. As a result of seeing his distress, Yami Yugi emerges and challenges the doctor to a Dark Game, hoping to stop him for good.
17	"A Last Minute Match – The Model that Invites"; Transliteration: "Girigiri Shōbu – Izanau Moderu" (Japanese: ギリギリ勝負 誘うモデル)	Katsuhiko Chiba	July 25, 1998
Kaiba's third Game Master, the world-famous model Aileen Rao, challenges Yugi to a game of Raijinhai. Aileen happens to be Anzu's idol, and also prides herself on taking away the most important things from the ones she defeats. If Yugi loses, then Aileen's pet tiger will kill Anzu, the most important person to him. This forces Yami Yugi to emerge and play a Dark Game with Aileen to save Anzu's life.
18	"Don't Touch the Forbidden Game"; Transliteration: "Kindan Gēmu ni Tewodasuna" (Japanese: 禁断ゲームに手を出すな)	Toshiki Inoue	August 1, 1998
Yugi befriends a bullied boy named Imori, and the two discover the forbidden game known as Dragon Block. The evil game takes control of Imori and he challenges a clueless Yugi to play the game. The evil Imori overcomes Yugi, causing him to lose his soul. However, it turns out that Yami Yugi is still there, and he challenges Imori to a Dark Game where the loser's soul will be devoured by the Dragon Block.
19	"The Great Melee!! A Popularity Contest"; Transliteration: "Dai Ransen!! Ninki Kontesuto" (Japanese: 大乱戦！！人気コンテスト)	Yasuko Kobayashi	August 8, 1998
With Honda's support, Miho enters a popularity contest against arrogant school beauty Kaoruko Himekoji. When Kaoruko resorts to cheating and hurts Miho, Yami Yugi challenges her to a Dark Game she is bound to lose.
20	"It's Here!! The Strongest and Final Trump Card"; Transliteration: "Deta!! Saikyō Saigo no Kirifuda" (Japanese: 出た！！最強最後の切り札)	Toshiki Inoue	August 15, 1998
Kaiba's butler Daimon, an old man kept alive through machinery, duels Yugi as the final Game Master. In the process, he reveals that Kaiba used to be a good person, and implores Yugi to restore his kindness.
21	"Complete!! The Ultimate Game Land"; Transliteration: "Kansei!! Kyūkyoku no Gēmu Rando" (Japanese: 完成！！究極のゲームランド)	Katsuhiko Chiba	August 22, 1998
Kaiba kidnaps Yugi's grandfather and dares him to come to Death-T, an indoor amusement park full of death traps. However, Yugi is hesitant to put his friends in danger.
22	"Breakthrough – Borderline Shooting"; Transliteration: "Yabure – Genkai Shūtingu" (Japanese: 破れ 限界シューティング)	Yasuko Kobayashi	August 29, 1998
Yugi and his friends journey through Death-T, making their way through a laser tag game against special forces members, and a game of wits with a giant killer robot.
23	"Capumon King! Showdown for the Top!!"; Transliteration: "Kapumon Ō! Chōjō Kessen!!" (Japanese: カプモン王！頂上決戦！！)	Toshiki Inoue	September 5, 1998
When Honda is seemingly killed by one of Kaiba's death traps, an enraged Yugi battles Mokuba, Kaiba's younger brother, in a game of Capsule Monster Chess. This is the first time Jonouchi and Miho see his alter-ego. After Mokuba loses and faces a Penalty Game where his soul will be devoured, Yugi saves him, ultimately going to Death-T 5 to defeat Seto Kaiba in a game of Duel Monsters.
24	"Now! The Time of Decision and the Miracle Friendship"; Transliteration: "Ima! Ketchaku no Toki Kiseki no Yūjō" (Japanese: 今！決着の時奇跡の友情)	Toshiki Inoue	September 12, 1998
With the lives of his grandfather and friends at stake, Yugi duels Kaiba, who has three Blue-Eyes White Dragons up his sleeve, while Jonouchi and Miho battle Ryuichi and Aileen. With his friends' support, Yugi pulls off an unbeatable combo: Exodia the Forbidden One.
25	"A New Development – The Handsome Boy who Attacks"; Transliteration: "Aratanaru Tenkai Osō Bishōnen" (Japanese: 新たなる展開 襲う美少年)	Yasuko Kobayashi	September 26, 1998
Yugi and his friends meet Ryou Bakura, a gentle new student with an interest in role-playing games. Little do they know that he has an alter ego as well, one that seeks to take Yugi's Millennium Puzzle for himself. He also has a history of playing Dark Games with people, although people are unaware that it was Bakura's alter-ego, Yami Bakura. One day, Yugi and his friends visit Bakura's house to ask if they can play a game of Monster World. They end up playing, but with a twist – anyone Yami Bakura defeats will have their souls trapped inside their respective figurines.
26	"Clash of Rivals – The Greatest Pinch"; Transliteration: "Raibaru Gekitotsu – Saidai Pinchi" (Japanese: ライバル激突 最大ピンチ)	Toshiki Inoue	October 3, 1998
Yami Yugi aids his other self and his friends, who have their souls trapped inside figurines, against Yami Bakura and his RPG's boss character, Dark Master Zorc. Both Yugis see each other for the first time, and although Yugi's friends are surprised to see this, they do not mind. They continue the game and eventually challenge Zorc.
27	"Friendship – From Legend to Myth"; Transliteration: "Yūjō – Densetsu Kara Shinwa e" (Japanese: 友情 伝説から神話へ)	Toshiki Inoue	October 10, 1998
Even when seemingly defeated, Dark Master Zorc rises again and threatens to overwhelm the gang. It is up to Bakura to defeat his evil counterpart with help from Yami Yugi. Eventually, Bakura is able to destroy Yami Bakura's possessed dice, with Yugi and his friends saving him from death, allowing the gang to win the game. Afterwards, their souls are freed from the Monster World figurines.

== Home video releases ==
VHS volume	Content	Release date
1	Episodes 1–3	December 10, 1999
2	Episodes 4–7	December 10, 1999
3	Episodes 8–11	December 10, 1999
4	Episodes 12–15	January 21, 2000
5	Episodes 16–19	January 21, 2000
6	Episodes 20–23	February 21, 2000
7	Episodes 24–27	February 21, 2000

== Cancellation ==
In a May 2026 interview with Kaishi Professional University, Yu-Gi-Oh! Duel Monsters producer Yoshiro Kataoka said that Shueisha planned to create another Yu-Gi-Oh! adaptation from the manga they published in Weekly Shōnen Jump after the Toei series was canceled due to low ratings. When Toei and TV Asahi refused to give Jump back the anime rights to Yu-Gi-Oh!, Kazuhiko Torishima, then the editor-in-chief of Jump threatened to revoke Toei's license of adapting Jump's Dragon Ball manga and pull Jump manga adapted anime series from TV Asahi, prompting them both to return the rights of Yu-Gi-Oh!. The second series, Yu-Gi-Oh! Duel Monsters, animated by Studio Gallop premiered on TV Tokyo in 2000.

== Reception ==
Timothy Donohoo of Comic Book Resources characterized the series as "noticeably darker" compared to other Yu-Gi-Oh! series. Some stories from the original manga are expanded, while others were not covered in this series. Some violence was reduced compared to the original work. Compared to Yu-Gi-Oh! Duel Monsters, the Duel Monsters card game is less of a focal point in this series, which was adapted from the earlier chapters.

The Toei series has a different visual style than Yu-Gi-Oh! Duel Monsters, as it was referenced from earlier manga volumes. Laura Thornton, also of CBR, described the art style as "extremely saturated and bright" although background imagery has a "notably muted palette with dull colors". Seto Kaiba has green hair in this show, although the sequel film associated with this series uses brown hair for Kaiba.
