= PB&J Television =

Logo of PB&J television

PB&J Television, also known as PB&J TV, is a television production company based in Santa Monica, California, USA.

== History ==
PB&J was started in 2004 by Julie Pizzi and Patty Ivins. Ivins has been working in reality television and news/documentary since 1996, and Pizzi since 1998. PB&J Television has executive produced NBC’s Sports Illustrated: Swimsuit Model Search, L.A. Riding Club for TLC, Showtime’s Reversal of Fortune, Style’s The Modern Girl’s Guide to Life, and CMT’s Pageant School: Becoming Miss America.

Prior to forming PB&J, Ivins was the supervising producer of the hit TV series The Simple Life, and Pizzi was a creative vice president at Bunim-Murray Productions for five years. While at Bunim-Murry, Pizzi spearheaded development and executive produced several high-rated seasons of MTV's Road Rules, MTV's Real World/Road Rules Challenge and VH-1’s Born to Diva. Ivins also spent time at Bunim-Murray Productions, where she produced and directed various shows including MTV’S Making the Band, MTV’S Road Rules and Fox’s Who Wants to Be a Playboy Playmate? Together Ivins and Pizzi co-executive produced FOX's The Simple Life Reunion.

In addition to reality television, both Ivins and Pizzi have produced many hours of documentary programming for Showtime, A&E, AMC, TLC and Discovery.

== Television productions ==
- Miss America: Reality Check (2008)
- America's Prom Queen (2008)
- Dress My Nest (2007)
- Outrageous Proposals (2007)
- Resolutionaries (2007)
- Pageant School: Becoming Miss America (2006)
- LA Riding Club (2006)
- Sports Illustrated Swimsuit Model Search (2005)
- Reversal of Fortune (2005)
- Modern Girl's Guide to Life (2003)
