= Yu-Gi-Oh! (1999 film) =

1999 short film by Junji Shimizu

- VHS cover art
- Japanese: 遊☆戯☆王
- Revised Hepburn: Yū Gi Ō
- Directed by: Junji Shimizu
- Screenplay by: Yasuko Kobayashi
- Based on: Yu-Gi-Oh! by Kazuki Takahashi
- Starring: Megumi Ogata; Toshiyuki Morikawa; Hikaru Midorikawa
- Cinematography: Junichi Takeda
- Edited by: Shigeru Nishiyama
- Music by: BMF
- Production company: Toei Animation
- Distributed by: Toei Company
- Release date: March 6, 1999
- Running time: 30 minutes
- Country: Japan
- Language: Japanese
- Box office: ¥650 million

Yu-Gi-Oh! (Japanese: 遊☆戯☆王, Hepburn: Yū Gi Ō) is a 1999 Japanese animated fantasy adventure short film directed by Junji Shimizu and written by Yasuko Kobayashi; the short film is based on a manga series of the same name by Kazuki Takahashi. Produced by Toei Animation and distributed by Toei Company, it takes place in the same continuity of the first anime series, specifically after the final episode of the first series. The short revolves around a boy named Shōgo Aoyama, who is targeted by Seto Kaiba after obtaining a powerful rare card; the legendary Red-Eyes Black Dragon. The short film stars Megumi Ogata as the voice of Yugi Mutou, alongside Toshiyuki Morikawa and Hikaru Midorikawa. It was released in Japan on March 6, 1999, as part of Toei Animation Spring 1999 Animation Fair, featuring alongside Dr. Slump: Arale's Surprise Burn and Digimon Adventure.

== Plot ==
A shy boy named Shōgo Aoyama buys Duel Monsters cards at a card shop and obtains Red-Eyes Black Dragon, a card that brings potential to those who duel with courage. Despite having never won a game of Duel Monsters before, Shōgo boasts to his former bullies that he does not need to duel others since having Red-Eyes Black Dragon alone makes him the strongest duelist. Having noticed Shōgo possessing this card, Seto Kaiba sends out invitations to him, as well as Yugi Mutou, for a tournament against him. When Shōgo refuses the invitation, Kaiba sends one of his men to force him to attend, which catches the attention of Yugi and his friend, Katsuya Jonouchi. As Jonouchi holds off the man, Yugi and Shōgo try to escape but are attacked by another guard who steals Shōgo's Red Eyes Black Dragon and Yugi's Millennium Puzzle. As Jonouchi manages to retrieve the card, Shōgo admits he's afraid to duel, because if he lost with the card he would no longer be able to claim that he's strong. Yugi decides to duel in his place and settle things with Kaiba.

Yugi retrieves his Millennium Puzzle from Kaiba and transforms into his alter ego, as Kaiba prepares the duel using a new holographic Duel Disk system. Although Yugi takes an early lead, Kaiba brings out his Blue-Eyes White Dragon. Yugi manages to defeat it, but Kaiba laughs as he summons another one and combines it with his other two dragons. As Yugi moves onto the defensive, Shōgo attempts to run away, but Jonouchi stops him. Jonouchi reveals he had sneaked Shōgo's Red-Eyes Black Dragon into Yugi's deck, though Yugi refuses to use it until Shōgo shows courage. When Kaiba stops Yugi's ability to defend, Shōgo is inspired by Jonouchi's words and Yugi's determination and finally shows courage, encouraging Yugi to summon Red-Eyes Black Dragon. He fuses Red-Eyes with his Meteor Dragon to form Meteor Black Dragon and defeats Kaiba.

The credits show Shōgo playing Duel Monsters with other people.

== Voice cast ==
- Megumi Ogata as Yugi Mutou
- Hikaru Midorikawa as Seto Kaiba
- Toshiyuki Morikawa as Katsuya Jonouchi (Note: Joey Wheeler in the English version of the Duel Monsters anime)
- Yumi Kakazu as Anzu Mazaki (Note: Téa Gardner in the English version of the Duel Monsters anime)
- Ryōtarō Okiayu as Hiroto Honda (Note: Tristan Taylor in the English version of the Duel Monsters anime)
- Eiko Yamada as Shōgo Aoyama
- Hisako Kyōda as Shopkeeper
- Yukana as Miho Nosaka

== Production ==
The short film is directed by Junji Shimizu and written by Yasuko Kobayashi, who have written few episodes for the series. Michi Himeno and Shingo Araki returned from the television series to design the characters and animation direction, along with BMF providing the music for the film. The opening theme is "Kawaita Sabeki" by Field of View, and the ending theme is "Ashita Moshi Kimi ga Kowaretemo" by WANDS.

== Release ==
The short film was released in theaters in Japan on March 6, 1999, as part of Toei Animation Spring 1999 Animation Fair, and was featured along with Dr. Slump: Arale's Surprise Burn and Digimon Adventure.

== Reception ==
The short film, along with Dr. Slump: Arale's Surprise Burn and Digimon Adventure collectively grossed ¥650 million (2001) (equivalent to ¥729.74 million or US$4.82 million in 2024).
