= Yu-Gi-Oh! =

Manga series by Kazuki Takahashi and its franchise

- First tankōbon volume cover, featuring Yugi Mutou

遊☆戯☆王 (Yū Gi Ō)
- Genre: Adventure; Science fantasy
- Manga
- Written by: Kazuki Takahashi
- Published by: Shueisha
- English publisher: NA: Viz Media
- Imprint: Jump Comics
- Magazine: Weekly Shōnen Jump
- English magazine: NA: Shonen Jump
- Original run: September 17, 1996 – March 8, 2004
- Volumes: 38
- Novel
- Written by: Katsuhiko Chiba
- Illustrated by: Kazuki Takahashi
- Published by: Shueisha
- Imprint: Jump J-Books
- Published: September 3, 1999
- Anime television series
- Yu-Gi-Oh! (1998 TV series); Yu-Gi-Oh! Duel Monsters (2000–04)
- Anime films
- Yu-Gi-Oh! (1999 film); Yu-Gi-Oh! The Movie: Pyramid of Light (2004); Yu-Gi-Oh!: Bonds Beyond Time (2010); Yu-Gi-Oh!: The Dark Side of Dimensions (2016)
- Other series
- List of all Yu-Gi-Oh! series; Yu-Gi-Oh! R
- Other media
- Video games; Trading card game
- icon

Yu-Gi-Oh! (Japanese: 遊☆戯☆王, Hepburn: Yū Gi Ō; lit. 'Game King') is a Japanese manga series written and illustrated by Kazuki Takahashi. It was serialized in Shueisha's shōnen manga magazine Weekly Shōnen Jump from September 1996 to March 2004, with its chapters collected in 38 tankōbon volumes. The series follows Yugi Mutou, a teenager who solves the ancient Egyptian Millennium Puzzle. This revives an ancient gambling spirit sealed inside the Puzzle, who commonly possesses Yugi to solve conflicts with various games. Yugi gradually learns of the spirit, with whom he eventually forms a friendship as he and his friends aim to discover the spirit's origin. By its later arcs, the manga largely shifts its focus to the collectible card game Duel Monsters (originally known as Magic & Wizards), where opposing players "duel" each other in mock battles of fantasy monsters.

The manga spawned a media franchise, which includes multiple anime series, spin-off manga, video games, and a real-world card game adapted from the fictional Duel Monsters game. The original series was adapted into two anime series: an eponymous series produced by Toei Animation, which aired from April to October 1998; and Yu-Gi-Oh! Duel Monsters, produced by NAS and animated by Gallop, which aired from April 2000 to September 2004. The franchise also includes four films, with an eponymous short film based on the Toei series released March 1999, and the Duel Monsters anime leading to the feature films Pyramid of Light (2004) and Bonds Beyond Time (2010), the latter also crossing over with the spin-off series Yu-Gi-Oh! GX and Yu-Gi-Oh! 5D's. Yu-Gi-Oh! The Dark Side of Dimensions, released in 2016, is set after the original manga series.

By July 2022, the manga had over 40 million copies in circulation, making it one of the best-selling manga series, and the overall franchise has generated over $5 billion in retail sales, making it one of the highest-grossing media franchises of all time.

== Plot ==
Yu-Gi-Oh! follows Yugi Mutou, a timid high schooler who is frequently bullied. Yugi loves to play games and, at the beginning of the series, is solving the Millennium Puzzle (千年パズル, Sennen Pazuru), an Ancient Egyptian artifact, hoping that it will grant him his wish of making friends. Yugi eventually completes the Puzzle, causing his body to become the host to a mysterious spirit with the personality of a gambler. From that moment onwards, whenever Yugi or any of his friends is threatened, the spirit, briefly possessing Yugi, challenges the antagonist to Shadow Games (闇のゲーム, Yami no Gēmu; lit. 'Game of Darkness') that reveal that person's true nature, with the loser often being subjected to an adverse Penalty Game (罰ゲーム, Batsu Gēmu). Yugi and his friends gradually learn of the spirit's existence, referring to him as the "other Yugi".

As the series progresses, Yugi and his friends learn that the spirit is actually that of a nameless Pharaoh of Ancient Egypt, who had lost his memories after being sealed inside the Puzzle. As Yugi and his companions attempt to help the Pharaoh regain his memories, they go through many trials as they wager their lives facing off against those who wield the other Millennium Items (千年アイテム, Sennen Aitemu) and the dark power of the Shadow Games.

== Development ==
In the initial planning stages of Yu-Gi-Oh!, Takahashi had originally wanted to draw a horror manga. Although the result was a manga revolving around games, some horror elements influenced certain aspects of the story. Takahashi decided to use "battle" as his primary theme. Since there were so many manga based around fighting, he found it difficult to come up with something original. He decided to create a battle manga where the main character does not hit anybody, but also struggled with that limitation. When the word "game" came to mind, he found it much easier to work with.

When an interviewer asked Takahashi if he tried to introduce younger readers to real life gaming culture referenced in the series, Takahashi explained that he simply included "stuff he played and enjoyed", and that it may have introduced readers to role-playing games and others. He added that he created some of the games seen in the series, stressing the importance of "communication between people" that is often present in tabletop role-playing games but absent in solitary video games and especially over the Internet, where quality communication is near impossible.

Takahashi had always been interested in games, claiming to have been obsessed as a child and remained interested in them as an adult. In a game, he considered the player to become a hero. He decided to base the Yu-Gi-Oh! series around such games and used this idea as the premise; Yugi was a weak, immature boy, who became a hero when he played games. With friendship being one of the major themes of Yu-Gi-Oh!, he based the names of the two major characters "Yūgi" and "Jōnouchi" on the Japanese word yūjō, which means "friendship". Henshin, the ability to turn into something or someone else, is something Takahashi believed all children dreamed of. He considered Yugi's "henshin" Dark Yugi, a savvy, invincible games player, to be a big appeal to children.

Takahashi said that the card game held the strongest influence in the manga, because it "happened to evoke the most response" from readers. Prior to that point, Takahashi did not plan to make the story about cards.

Takahashi said that the "positive message" for readers of the series is that each person has a "strong hidden part" (like "human potential") within himself or herself, and when one encounters hardship, the "hidden part" can emerge if one believes in him/herself and in his/her friends. Takahashi added that this is "a pretty consistent theme."

The editor of the English version, Jason Thompson, said that the licensing of the Yu-Gi-Oh! manga had not been entirely coordinated, so Viz decided to use many of the original character names and to "keep it more or less violent and gory". Thompson said that the manga "was almost unchanged from the Japanese original". Because the core fanbase of the series was, according to Thompson, "8-year-old boys (and a few incredible fangirls)", and because the series had little interest from "hardcore, Japanese-speaking fans, the kind who run scanlation sites and post on messageboards" as the series was perceived to be "too mainstream", the Viz editors allowed Thompson "a surprising amount of leeway with the translation". In a 2004 interview, the editors of the United States Shonen Jump publication mentioned that Americans were surprised when reading the stories in the first seven volumes, as they had not appeared on television as a part of the Yu-Gi-Oh! Duel Monsters anime. Takahashi added "The story is quite violent, isn't it? [laughs]"

The English language release of the Duel Monsters anime by 4Kids has been subject to censorship to make it more appropriate for children; for example, mentions of death or violence were replaced by references to "being sent to the Shadow Realm".

The Japanese title, Yūgiō (遊戯王), stylized as "Yu-Gi-Oh!" (遊☆戯☆王), translates into English as "Game King". Yūgi (遊戯) is also the name of the protagonist, while Yūgiō is also the title the second personality inhabiting his body holds as an invincible game master. Additionally, the character names "Yūgi" and "Jōnouchi" are based on the word yūjō (友情; lit. 'friendship').

== Media ==
=== Manga ===
Written and illustrated by Kazuki Takahashi, Yu-Gi-Oh! was serialized in Shueisha's shōnen manga magazine Weekly Shōnen Jump from September 17, 1996, to March 8, 2004. Shueisha collected its chapters in thirty-eight tankōbon volumes, released from March 4, 1997, to June 4, 2004. Shueisha republished its chapters in twenty-two bunkoban volumes from April 18, 2007, to March 18, 2008.

In North America, the manga was licensed by Viz Media. The company started publishing it in its Shonen Jump magazine from November 2002 to November 2007. The company also released the manga in volumes, divided in three series; the first series, Yu-Gi-Oh!, includes the first seven volumes, and were released from May 7, 2003; to December 7, 2004. The second series, Yu-Gi-Oh!: Duelist includes the original volumes 8–31, and Yu-Gi-Oh!: Millennium World, includes the original volumes 32–38. Both series started publication in 2005; the first volume of Duelist was released on February 1, and the first volume of Millennium World on August 2. The 24th and last volume of Duelist was released on December 4, 2007, and the seventh and final volume of Millennium World was released on February 5, 2008. Viz Media republished the series in a 13 three-in-one volume edition from February 3, 2015, to February 6, 2018.

A two-part short story by Takahashi, titled Yu-Gi-Oh! Transcend Game, was published in Weekly Shōnen Jump on April 11 and 18, 2016. Takahashi created the story to link the end of the original manga with the story of the Yu-Gi-Oh! The Dark Side of Dimensions anime film. Viz Media published the manga in its digital Weekly Shonen Jump magazine.

==== Yu-Gi-Oh! R ====
A spin-off manga titled Yu-Gi-Oh! R was illustrated by Akira Ito under Takahashi's supervision. It was serialized in V Jump between 2004 and 2007, and its chapters were collected in five volumes. Viz Media released the series in North America between 2009 and 2010.

=== Anime ===
==== Anime franchise overview ====
No.	Title	Episodes	Originally aired / Release date	Director	Studio	Network
1	Yu-Gi-Oh!	27	April 4, 1998 – October 10, 1998	Hiroyuki Kakudō	Toei Animation	TV Asahi
Film	Yu-Gi-Oh!		March 6, 1999	Junji Shimizu	Toei Animation	
2	Yu-Gi-Oh! Duel Monsters	224	April 18, 2000 – September 29, 2004	Kunihisa Sugishima	Gallop	TXN (TV Tokyo)
Film	Yu-Gi-Oh! The Movie: Pyramid of Light		November 3, 2004	Hatsuki Tsuji	4Kids Entertainment; Gallop	
3	Yu-Gi-Oh! GX	180	October 6, 2004 – March 26, 2008	Hatsuki Tsuji	Gallop	TXN (TV Tokyo)
Miniseries	Yu-Gi-Oh! Capsule Monsters	12	September 9, 2006 – November 25, 2006	Eric Stuart	4Kids Entertainment; Gallop	4Kids TV
4	Yu-Gi-Oh! 5D's	154 + 1	April 2, 2008 – March 30, 2011	Katsumi Ono	Gallop	TXN (TV Tokyo)
Film	Yu-Gi-Oh!: Bonds Beyond Time		January 23, 2010	Kenichi Takeshita	Gallop	
5	Yu-Gi-Oh! Zexal	73 + 1	April 11, 2011 – September 24, 2012	Satoshi Kuwahara	Gallop	TXN (TV Tokyo)
6	Yu-Gi-Oh! Zexal II	73 + 1	October 7, 2012 – March 23, 2014	Satoshi Kuwahara	Gallop	TXN (TV Tokyo)
7	Yu-Gi-Oh! Arc-V	148	April 6, 2014 – March 26, 2017	Katsumi Ono	Gallop	TXN (TV Tokyo)
Film	Yu-Gi-Oh!: The Dark Side of Dimensions		April 23, 2016	Satoshi Kuwabara	Gallop	
8	Yu-Gi-Oh! VRAINS	120	May 10, 2017 – September 25, 2019	Masahiro Hosoda (#1–13); Katsuya Asano (#14–120)	Gallop	TXN (TV Tokyo)
9	Yu-Gi-Oh! Sevens	92	April 4, 2020 – March 27, 2022	Nobuhiro Kondo	Bridge	TXN (TV Tokyo)
10	Yu-Gi-Oh! Go Rush!!	151	April 3, 2022 – March 30, 2025	Nobuhiro Kondo	Bridge	TXN (TV Tokyo)
ONA	Yu-Gi-Oh! Card Game The Chronicles	10	April 21, 2025 – present	Takashi Kaiga	Konami Animation	YouTube
Total		13 1237 + 7	April 4, 1998 – present	—		

==== Television series ====
===== Yu-Gi-Oh! (1998 TV series) =====
The first Yu-Gi-Oh! anime adaptation was produced by Toei Animation and aired for 27 episodes on TV Asahi from April to October 1998.

===== Yu-Gi-Oh! Duel Monsters (2000 TV series) =====
A second anime television series adaptation, produced by NAS and animated by Gallop, was broadcast for 224 episodes on TV Tokyo from April 2000 to September 2004.

====== Capsule Monsters ======
Yu-Gi-Oh! Capsule Monsters consists of 12 addendum episodes of the Yu-Gi-Oh! Duel Monsters series, commissioned, produced and edited by 4Kids Entertainment, which aired in North America between September and November 2006.

==== Films ====
Four theatrical animated films based on the franchise have been released.

===== Yu-Gi-Oh! (1999) =====
Based on the Toei animated series, the thirty-minute Yu-Gi-Oh! film was released in March 1999.

===== Yu-Gi-Oh! The Movie: Pyramid of Light =====
Yu-Gi-Oh! The Movie: Pyramid of Light, often referred to as simply Yu-Gi-Oh! The Movie, was first released in North America in August 2004. The film was developed specifically for Western audiences by 4Kids based on the success of the Yu-Gi-Oh! franchise in the United States.

===== Yu-Gi-Oh! Bonds Beyond Time =====
Yu-Gi-Oh!: Bonds Beyond Time is a 3D film that was released in Japan in January 2010 and in North America in February 2011.

===== Yu-Gi-Oh! The Dark Side of Dimensions =====
Yu-Gi-Oh! The Dark Side of Dimensions, which was produced to commemorate the twentieth anniversary of the franchise, was released in Japan in April 2016 and in January 2017 in North America.

==== Spin-offs ====
Seven Yu-Gi-Oh! anime spin-offs have been produced. The first, Yu-Gi-Oh! GX, was broadcast from October 2004 to March 2008. It was succeeded by Yu-Gi-Oh! 5D's, which aired from April 2008 to March 2011. Yu-Gi-Oh! Zexal aired from April 2011 to March 2014. Yu-Gi-Oh! Arc-V premiered the following month and aired until March 2017. Yu-Gi-Oh! VRAINS aired from May 2017 to September 2019. Yu-Gi-Oh! Sevens aired from April 2020 to March 2022. Yu-Gi-Oh! Go Rush!!, an "interquel" to Sevens, aired from April 2022 to March 2025. An original net animation (ONA) series consisting of promotional shorts, titled Yu-Gi-Oh! Card Game The Chronicles, premiered on YouTube in April 2025 with new episodes debuting every month.

=== Novel ===
A novel adaptation of some of the beginning parts of the manga and the Death-T arc was written by Katsuhiko Chiba and published in Japan by Shueisha on September 3, 1999, consisting of four sections. The fourth section is an original story, occurring only in the novel. Two weeks after Yugi's battle with Kaiba in Death-T, Yugi gets a call from Kaiba, who tells him to meet for a game at the top floor of Kaiba Corporation. Yugi accepts, and when the game begins, they use a special variation of Magic & Wizards called the "Bingo Rule," which prevents the use of a specific card in each player's deck. Mokuba stumbles in on them, and tells Yugi that Kaiba has not yet awoken from his catatonic state. It turns out that the Kaiba that Yugi is playing against is a "Cyber Kaiba", controlled by the KaibaCorp computer, using all of Kaiba's memories.

=== Other books ===
The Gospel of Truth series guide for the manga

Yu-Gi-Oh! Character Guidebook: The Gospel of Truth (遊☆戯☆王キャラクターズガイドブック―真理の福音―, Yūgiō Kyarakutāzu Gaido Bukku Shinri no Fukuin) is a guidebook written by Kazuki Takahashi related to characters from the original Yu-Gi-Oh! manga universe. It was published on November 1, 2002, by Shueisha under their Jump Comics imprint. The book contains profiles for characters, including information which has never been released elsewhere, including birth dates, height, weight, blood type, favorite and least favorite food. It also contains a plethora of compiled information from the story, including a list of names for the various games and Shadow Games that appear in Yu-Gi-Oh! and the various Penalty Games used by the Millennium Item wielders.

An art book titled, Duel Art (デュエルアート, Dyueruāto) was illustrated by Kazuki Takahashi under the Studio Dice label. The art book was released on December 16, 2011, and contains a number of illustrations done for the bunkoban releases of the manga, compilations of color illustrations found in the manga, and brand new art drawn for the book. It also contains pictures by Takahashi used for cards with the anniversary layout, pictures he has posted on his website and a number of other original illustrations. Udon Press published an English version, translated by Caleb D. Cook.

The Theatrical & TV Anime Yu-Gi-Oh! Super Complete Book (劇場&TVアニメ『遊☆戯☆王』スーパー・コンプリートブック, Gekijō & TV Anime Yūgiō Sūpā Konpurītobukku) was released in May 1999 following the release of Toei's Yu-Gi-Oh! film earlier that year. The book includes episode information and pictures regarding the anime and film, some pictures with the original manga with a section covering the making of certain monsters, and interviews regarding the film. It also features an ani-manga version of the film and is the only supplemental work released for the Toei anime.

The Yu-Gi-Oh! 10th Anniversary Animation Book (遊☆戯☆王 テンス アニバーサリー アニメーション ブック, Yūgiō! Tensu Anivāsarī Animēshon Bukku) is a book released to celebrate the tenth anniversary of the NAS adaption of the anime (as opposed to the manga), released on January 21, 2010. The book features scenes from Yu-Gi-Oh! 3D Bonds Beyond Time, a quick review of the three Yu-Gi-Oh! Duel Monsters series, character profiles, duels and interviews with the staff of the film. A fold-out double-sided poster is included with the book.

- Yu-Gi-Oh! Official Card Game Duel Monsters Official Rule Guide — The Thousand Rule Bible (ISBN 4-08-782134-X): a rule book and strategy guide for the Junior and Shin Expert rules. This also has a Q & A related to certain cards, and the book comes with the "multiply" card.
- Yu-Gi-Oh! Official Card Game Duel Monsters Official Card Catalog The Valuable Book: a collection of card catalogues.
  - Volume 1 (ISBN 4-08-782764-X)
  - Volume 2 (ISBN 4-08-782041-6)
  - Volume 3 (ISBN 4-08-782135-8)
  - Volume 4 (ISBN 4-08-782047-5)
  - Volume 5 (ISBN 4-08-782053-X)
- Yu-Gi-Oh!: Monster Duel Official Handbook by Michael Anthony Steele (ISBN 0-439-65101-8, published by Scholastic Press): a guide book to Yu-Gi-Oh! cards and characters
- Yu-Gi-Oh! Enter the Shadow Realm: Mighty Champions by Jeff O'Hare (ISBN 0-439-67191-4, published by Scholastic Press): a book with puzzles and games related to Yu-Gi-Oh!

=== Trading card game ===
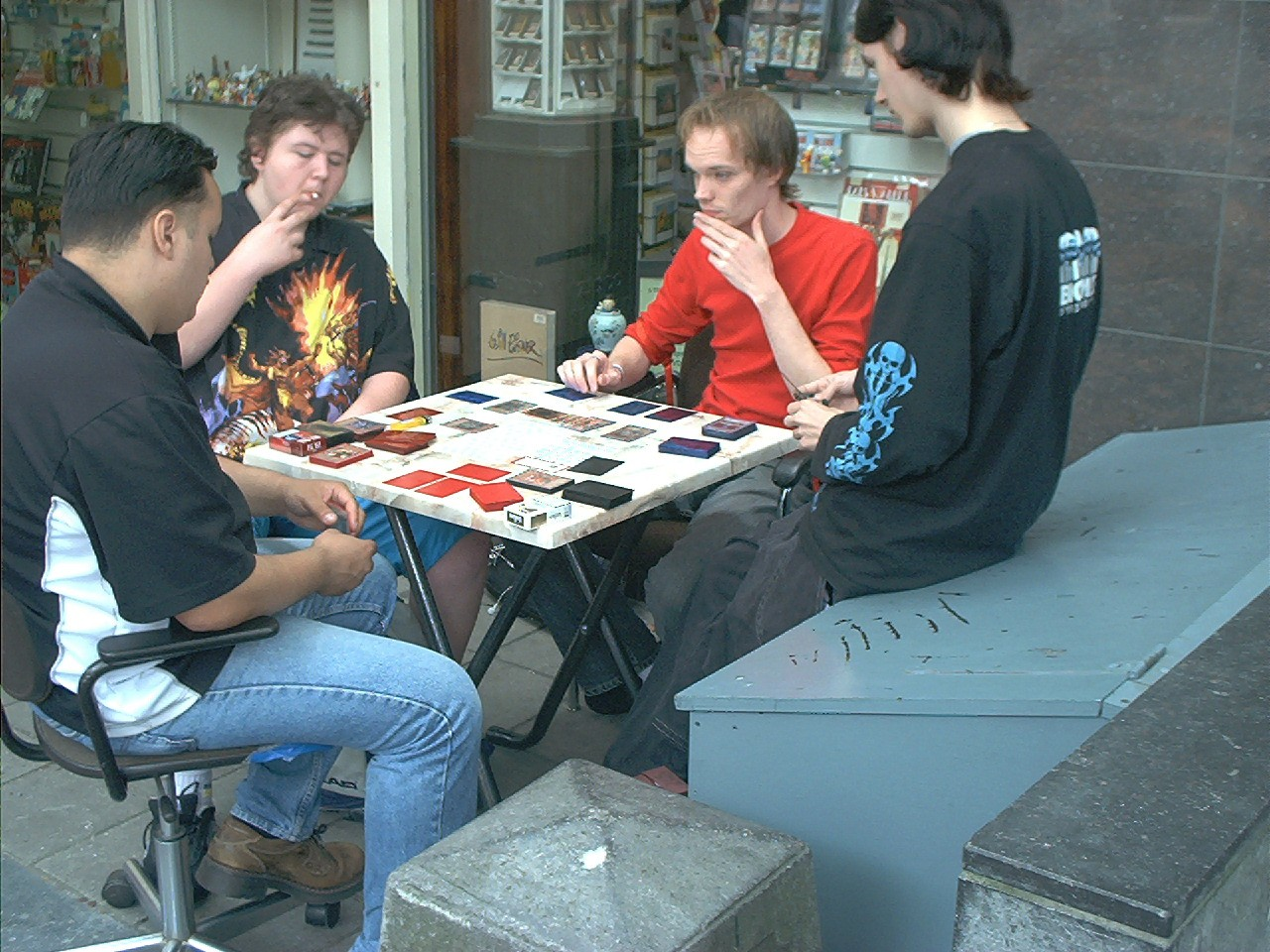
A group of young men playing the Yu-Gi-Oh! Trading Card Game

The Yu-Gi-Oh! Trading Card Game is a Japanese collectible card battle game developed and published by Konami. Based on the Duel Monsters game from the original manga series, the game sees players using a combination of monsters, spells, and traps to defeat their opponent. The game was first launched in Japan in 1999 and has undergone various changes over the years, such as the inclusion of new monster types to coincide with the release of new anime series. In 2011, Guinness World Records named it the best-selling trading card game in history, with 25.2 billion cards sold worldwide. As of January 2021, the game is estimated to have sold approximately 35 billion cards worldwide.

=== Video games ===
There are several video games based on the Yu-Gi-Oh! franchise, which are published by Konami and the majority of which are based on the trading card game, and some based on other games that appeared in the manga. Aside from various games released for consoles and handheld systems, arcade machines known as Duel Terminals have been released which are compatible with certain cards in the trading card game. Outside of Konami's titles, Yugi appears as a playable character in the crossover fighting games Jump Super Stars, Jump Ultimate Stars, and Jump Force. A collaboration with Konami's football video game eFootball was released in 2025.

== Reception ==
The manga has sold over 40 million copies worldwide. In December 2002, Shonen Jump received the ICv2 Award for "Comic Product of the Year" due to its unprecedented sales numbers and its successfully connecting comics to both the television medium and the Yu-Gi-Oh! collectible card game, one of the top CCG games of the year. In August 2008, TV Tokyo reported that over 18 billion Yu-Gi-Oh! cards had been sold worldwide. By 2011, it had sold 25.2 billion cards worldwide. The franchise generated $5 billion in retail sales.

John Jakala of Anime News Network reviewed the Yu-Gi-Oh! manga in 2003 as part of reviewing the U.S. Shonen Jump publication. Jakala said that while the commercials for the second series anime made it appear "completely uninteresting," the manga was "unexpectedly dark and moody." Jakala added that at one moment the series reminded him of "Neil Gaiman's work: Yugi finds himself drawn into a magical world of ancient forces where there are definite rules that must be obeyed." Jakala concluded that the fact the series uses games as plot devices "opens up a lot of story possibilities" and that he feared that the series had the potential to "simply devolve into a tie-in for the popular card game."

Jason Thompson, the editor of the English version of the manga, ranked Yu-Gi-Oh! as number three of his five personal favorite series to edit, stating that he thinks "the story is actually pretty solid for a shonen manga" and that "you can tell it was written by an older man because of the obsession with death, and what might come after death, which dominates the final story arc," enjoying all the RPG and card gaming terminology found within the series.

Lisa Takeuchi Cullen argued that the manga series started to garner more popularity among Japanese children with the second series because of its somewhat "dark story lines, leggy girls and terrifying monsters". Cullen speculated that the series was not popular among Japanese parents, due to it being more intended for teenagers rather than the younger children that make up the audience for franchises such as Pokémon.

In TV Asahi's 2006 poll of the Top 100 Anime, Yu-Gi-Oh! came in 96th. Yu-Gi-Oh! was featured by Bandai as part of their Candy Toy toy line.

== Cultural impact ==
A fandub parody series of Yu-Gi-Oh!, titled Yu-Gi-Oh!: The Abridged Series, was created by Bea Billany (also known as LittleKuriboh), who uploaded the first episode of the series on YouTube on July 15, 2006. After becoming popular, it started a trend among anime communities to produce abridged series for different works.

During the 2024 US Olympic track and field trials, Noah Lyles showed off Yu-Gi-Oh! cards Blue Eyes White Dragon and Exodia to the camera before running.
