= Reversal of Fortune (2005 film) =

2005 American documentary film

- Written by: Robert DeMaio
- Directed by: Wayne Powers
- Starring: Ted Rodrigue
- Country of origin: United States
- Original language: English

Production
- Producers: Patty Ivins Specht; Julie Pizzi
- Running time: 68 minutes
- Production companies: PB&J Television

Original release
- Network: Showtime
- Release: 2005

Reversal of Fortune is a 2005 American documentary film written by Robert DeMaio and directed by Wayne Powers. The film follows Ted Rodrigue, a homeless man from California who receives $100,000 cash (equivalent to $171,000 in 2026) from the filmmakers with no restrictions on how he spends the money.

The documentary was inspired by an encounter Powers had with a homeless man, after which he wondered if a significant amount of money alone would turn the man's life around. He took the idea to Showtime, where he had written and directed the limited series Out of Order, and they agreed on the condition the chosen person passed both a psychiatric evaluation and a drug test.

In 2006, Oprah Winfrey invited the filmmakers on her show, where she called it "a fascinating social experiment".

== Synopsis ==
Ted Rodrigue is a homeless man living under a bridge in California. He describes an average day of "survival" for him, which consists of collecting cans and bottles for recycling in order to buy food, cigarettes, and beer for the day. He estimates that an average day brings in about $25, while a good day might see as much as $35. Ted reflects on the better days of his life, when his mother (a former alcoholic) and sisters accepted him. He places a collect call to his mother, but she declines the charges. Ted blames his lack of family support on their prejudice against him for being homeless and his difficult childhood. He describes his mother as a "bar whore" who often brought strange men home, and accuses her of giving him his first beer at the age of twelve.

Ted claims he stays on the streets because he can "do as he pleases" and does not have to answer to any authority figures. He takes a lot of pride in his bicycle, and is shown washing it at a car wash. Through his recycling, Ted has befriended an 18-year-old Latino man named Mike who works at the recycling plant.

Ted is in the middle of his daily dumpster dive when he suddenly finds a briefcase full of cash amongst the rubbish. A note atop the money reads "What would a homeless person do if he were given $100,000?" Shocked and in tears, Ted comes to the realization that he is the recipient of a significant amount of money.

Ted almost immediately buys a new bicycle, rents a motel room to stay in, and takes Mike to an amusement park. Rumors spread among the homeless community and Ted, who once could not find a girlfriend due to his poor dental hygiene, now enjoys female companionship in his motel room. As soon as Ted notifies his mother and sisters of his newfound wealth, they begin to answer his phone calls and his mother invites him to stay with her while he finds his own residence. Ted's family privately discuss how they are concerned for his welfare.

A week after finding the money, and having spent over $2,000, Ted is still in the motel and is asked to speak with an advocate for the homeless. The counselor asks Ted what he thinks about having the money, to which Ted replies that he really had not thought about it much and that he has too much time on his hands now since he no longer has to recycle. Ted makes plans to leave for Sacramento to stay with his mother, but before leaving, he buys Mike a car and promises to fly one of his female companions to Sacramento once he is settled there.

The following weeks find Ted frequenting the local bar, his spending averaging $10,000 a week. He rents an apartment and buys furniture for it. He purchases a $35,000 Dodge Ram and another truck for one of his recently acquired girlfriends. The filmmakers then request that he meet with a financial planner. Ted meets with him, but firmly announces to him that he has no intentions of working and does not wish to plan ahead as he is only concerned with today. Ted states his belief that the financial planner is only after his money and rips up the man's business card.

Ted's sisters repeatedly try to convince him to seek employment, but he still believes he is "set for life". Ted has slowly come to resent the film producers for giving him the money.

The film ends by telling the viewer that, six months after finding the money, Ted refuses to disclose his latest bank balance. His sisters fear that it is less than $5,000.

== Aftermath ==
On December 1st 2006, Ted Rodrigue and director Wayne Powers appeared on The Oprah Winfrey Show to promote the documentary. When asked by Oprah how much of the $100,000 he still had, Ted replied "none". Ted also mentioned that he is homeless again, and content with his current circumstances.

As of July 2007, Ted was back in Pasadena and working for the same recycling plant shown in the film.
