= Yu-Gi-Oh! The Duelists of the Roses =

2001 video game

- Developer: Konami Computer Entertainment Japan
- Publisher: Konami
- Director: Morikuni Kubo
- Producer: Satoshi Shimomura
- Designer: Morikuni Kubo
- Programmer: Jun
- Artist: Masafumi Kamio
- Composers: Waichiro Ozaki; Hiroshi Tanabe
- Series: Yu-Gi-Oh!
- Platform: PlayStation 2
- Release: JP: September 6, 2001; NA: February 18, 2003; EU: September 26, 2003; AU: October 10, 2003
- Genre: Digital collectible card game
- Modes: Single-player, multiplayer

Yu-Gi-Oh! The Duelists of the Roses (Note: Japanese: 遊☆戯☆王真デュエルモンスターズII 継承されし記憶, Hepburn: Yu-Gi-Oh! Shin Dyueru Monsutāzu Tsū Keishō Sareshi Kioku; Yu-Gi-Oh! True Duel Monsters II Inherited Memories) is a video game developed by Konami based on the manga series Yu-Gi-Oh!. The game was released on September 6, 2001, in Japan, and worldwide throughout 2003. The story is a sequel to Yu-Gi-Oh! Forbidden Memories and is loosely based on the Wars of the Roses. The series' main characters, Yugi Mutou and Seto Kaiba, play on opposing teams known as the Lancastrians and the Yorkists. Each team is playable, battling various characters throughout the plot to prevent a ritual summoning by using sorcerous rose cards.

Using designs by creator Kazuki Takahashi, the game's battle system is based on a chessboard-style battlefield, with over 800 cards from the franchise. Several new features of The Duelists of the Roses differ from the original card game, such as altered card effects, terrain placement, reincarnations, and deck leader promotions. In addition, each monster card features updated 3D computer graphics modelling, which first appeared in Forbidden Memories. Due to content censorship, dialogue and visuals were changed to allow distribution in North America and Europe.

Yu-Gi-Oh! The Duelists of the Roses received mixed reviews from critics. Some publications praised its story and visuals, while the majority of criticism focused on the gameplay, lack of innovation, and high difficulty. The game was a commercial success, selling over one million units worldwide. Sony Computer Entertainment went on to commemorate the game with a Greatest Hits title, and it stands as one of the best-selling video games for the PlayStation 2 format.

== Gameplay ==
The player views their hand and selects the "Hourglass of Courage" monster card.

At the start of the game, the player is asked to input a name. They can decide to play or skip a practice duel, which teaches the game's "Perfect Rule" system, different from previous Yu-Gi-Oh! video games. Then, the player must choose one of three starting decks. Finally, they select a side to support: either the Lancastrians (Red Rose) or the Yorkists (White Rose). The storyline and opponents faced depend on the chosen side, but the main objective remains the same: moving across a map, dueling enemies and collecting the eight Rose Cards from the opposing faction.

Each duelist in the game has forty cards in their deck. Each of these cards has a certain cost, making a combined total called "deck cost". In campaign mode, the player's deck cost must be lower than the opponent's in order to face them. One extra card functions as an avatar for the player, and is called the Deck Leader. Certain Deck Leaders have special abilities that can help during duels.

Each duel takes place on a 7×7 grid of squares, where both Deck Leaders are placed on opposite sides. Both duelists start off with 4,000 life points and a five-card hand. On each turn, the player can move their Deck Leader one square, place a new card on an adjacent space (known as the summoning area) and move previously placed cards. When two opposing monster cards occupy the same space, they are flipped face up and a battle begins, with life points deducted accordingly. A monster is able to directly target the opponent's Deck Leader if it is close enough, dealing damage equal to the monster's attack. Trap cards and spell cards are also available; they can move and be activated to cause various effects.

Each square has one terrain type, out of ten in total. Seven of the terrain types (forest, meadow, dark, sea, wasteland, mountain and toon) can increase or decrease a monster's stats by 500 points, depending on its type. If a face-up monster card is located in a beneficial square, its range of movement is increased. Two terrain types have special effects: labyrinth, which is impenetrable to most cards, and crush, which destroys non-Immortal monsters with 1500 or more attack points (while giving Immortal monsters a 500-point bonus). The tenth type, normal terrain, has no effects.

Monsters can earn grade points depending on their performance in duels. When a monster has gained enough grade points, it is promoted to the next rank (out of 12 in total). To act as a Deck Leader, a monster must have been promoted at least once. Additional Deck Leader abilities can be unlocked as the monster's rank advances. Poor performance in duels can also cause demotions.

The game has a total of four victory conditions for the player: depleting the opponent's life points to zero, having the opponent's Deck Leader's summoning area surrounded with the player's own cards by the end of the enemy turn, possessing more life points than the opponent after 100 turns, or invoking Exodia. After winning a duel, the player can obtain cards from the opponent's graveyard, in a minigame similar to slot machines. New cards can also be acquired through "Reincarnation", a feature that allows them to sacrifice a card in exchange for three new cards.

== Plot ==
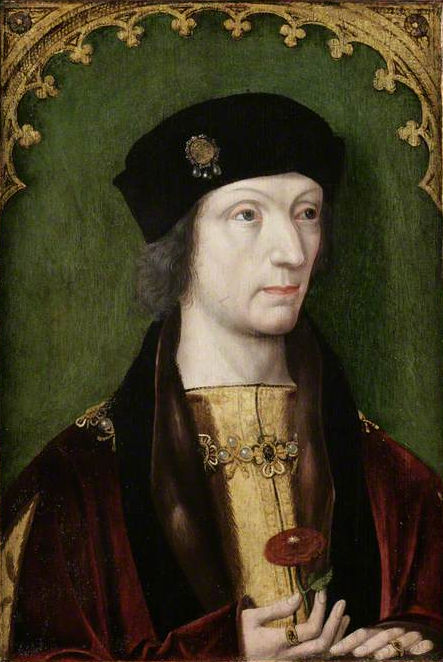
In the game, Yugi Mutou plays Henry Tudor (pictured).

The game is loosely based on the Wars of the Roses, a series of conflicts fought between the House of Lancaster and House of York for control of England in the 15th century.

In the story, both factions possess eight magical cards known as Rose Cards. The Yorkists have White Rose Cards while the Lancastrians retain Red Rose Cards. At the start of the game, the Yorkists hold an advantage on the battlefield and their claimant, Richard III of England (played by Heishin), has taken over the English throne. Meanwhile, the leader of the Lancastrians, Henry Tudor (played by Yugi Mutou), has been exiled alongside his army in France. Yugi and his forces are unable to return to England due to a magical barrier raised by the Rose Crusaders, a group of card sorcerers allied with the Yorkist forces, using their White Rose Cards. The leader of the Rose Crusaders is the legendary figure Christian Rosenkreuz, played by Seto Kaiba.

Hoping to obtain a powerful ally and to turn the tide of the war, a Lancastrian druid called Simon McMooran performs a ritual at Stonehenge. The Rose Duelist, controlled by the player, is summoned from an unknown time period to the 1480s; there, the druid asks for their help to defeat the Yorkists and reclaim the throne for the Lancastrians. Seto interrupts the conversation, revealing that a ritual known as Rose Summoning can be attempted if the 16 Rose Cards are obtained. He also remarks that the Rose Duelist will need all of the Rose Cards to return to their original time, forcing the player to take a side.

If the player sides with the Lancastrians, the Rose Duelist battles seven Rose Crusaders (represented by antagonists such as Weevil Underwood and Rex Raptor) for their White Rose Cards, as well as a nobleman named Thomas Stanley (played by Maximillion Pegasus). Obtaining the cards brings down the magical barrier and allows Yugi's army to enter England. After the Rose Duelist defeats Richard III in a duel, Pegasus betrays the Yorkists and joins the Lancastrian side. Following Yugi's victory, the Rose Duelist goes after Seto at Stonehenge to claim the final White Rose Card. After his defeat, Seto reveals that the power released during the duel, along with the Rose Cards brought there, has fulfilled the requirements for the Rose Summoning, and that he feigned allegiance to the Yorkists to force the Lancastrians to summon the Rose Duelist in the first place. Seto then summons Manawyddan fab Llyr, a mythological figure known as a Card Guardian, whom he intends to renew an ancient pact with to guarantee power for himself and his descendants. He offers the Rose Duelist as a sacrifice to Manawyddan, who readily accepts. However, the powerful entity loses the duel and is banished from the time period. Seto realizes Manawyddan was not the Card Guardian he intended to summon, since he was defeated by a mortal. It is unknown whether the Rose Duelist was ever returned to their original time period.

If the player sides with the Yorkists, the Rose Duelist faces Yu-Gi-Oh! series protagonists such as Joey Wheeler, Téa Gardner, and Yugi Mutou to take their Red Rose Cards. After collecting them and combining them with the Yorkists' eight White Rose Cards, Seto summons Manawyddan fab Llyr at Stonehenge. Manawyddan is furious that humans summoned his brother (DarkNite, from Yu-Gi-Oh! Forbidden Memories) in Egypt only to lock him away again. Seto realizes he summoned the wrong Card Guardian, and asks the Rose Duelist to end the summoning. After the duel, Seto explains that he has been looking for a true Card Guardian for a long time because an ancestor of his made a pact with one. Seto vows to send the Rose Duelist back to their era, and gives them a white rose pendant as part of the "Pledge of Roses", promising that his descendants will aid them in the future. After he leaves Stonehenge, his forces flee England. The Lancastrians are able to enter the country, since the White Rose Cards that raised the barrier have been used in the Rose Summoning, and they take control of the throne.

== Characters ==
=== Lancastrians ===
- Yugi Mutou as Henry Tudor, later Henry VII of England
- Téa Gardner as Elizabeth of York
- Tristan Taylor as Thomas Grey
- Mai Valentine as Lady Margaret Beaufort
- Joey Wheeler as Christopher Urswick
- Shadi as John Morton
- Ryo Bakura as Jack Cade
- Solomon Muto as Jasper Tudor

=== Yorkists ===
- Seto Kaiba as Christian Rosenkreuz
- Weevil Underwood
- Rex Raptor
- Bonz
- Bandit Keith
- Paradox Brothers
- Player Killer of Darkness (also known as PaniK)
- Maximillion Pegasus as Thomas Stanley, 1st Earl of Derby
- Ishizu Ishtar
- Heishin as Richard III of England

== Development and release ==
Yu-Gi-Oh! The Duelists of the Roses was developed by Konami Computer Entertainment Japan as a follow-up to Yu-Gi-Oh! Forbidden Memories

It was released on September 6, 2001, exclusively in Japan for the PlayStation 2, as Yu-Gi-Oh! True Duel Monsters II: Inherited Memories. Early releases included three randomly selected cards from a pool of five: "Fairy King Truesdale", "Cipher Soldier", "Slate Warrior", "Electromagnetic Bagworm", and "Rigorous Reaver".

Due to censorship issues, content from the original Japanese release had to be reworked before the game was released in North America and Europe. Several elements related to Christianity and other religious symbolism, which appeared throughout the game's plot, were removed. Furthermore, several card artworks and monster animations were edited to include more clothing because they appeared provocative and graphic.

Initial copies were shipped on February 13, 2003. Three days later, it received a wide release throughout North America, with early releases including three cards: "Alpha the Magnet Warrior," "Beta the Magnet Warrior," and "Gamma the Magnet Warrior". On September 26, 2003, The Duelists of the Roses was released throughout Europe. On December 12, 2002, it received a "Konami The Best" re-release in Japan.

== Reception ==
=== Critical response ===
Reception

Aggregate scores
| Aggregator | Score |
|---|---|
| GameRankings | 63% |
| Metacritic | 59/100 |

Review scores
| Publication | Score |
|---|---|
| Electronic Gaming Monthly | 5/10 |
| Game Informer | 8/10 |
| GamePro | 3/5 |
| GameSpot | 5.1/10 |
| GameSpy | 3/5 |
| IGN | 6.2/10 |
| Official U.S. PlayStation Magazine | 2.5/5 |
| X-Play | 3/5 |

Yu-Gi-Oh! The Duelists of the Roses garnered mixed reviews from critics. On Metacritic, which assigns a weighted average based on ratings from publications, the video game scored 59 out of 100 based on 14 reviews, indicating "mixed or average". On GameRankings, which assigns a similar metric average, the game scored 63%. Some critics praised the game's overall accuracy to the original card game. Andrew Reiner, writing for Game Informer, stated that "If a small portion of you has always wondered what a game like this is all about, this is the best card game that money can buy." Absolute PlayStation also gave it a positive review, echoing similar sentiments about the game's faithfulness to the original franchise. Michael J. Nam of GameSpy praised the "interesting" story for "diverging from the typical rehashing of a franchise universe seen in many similar tie-ins."

Most publications were split about the game's mechanics and features. Play Magazine praised the game as a "beautifully produced, rule heavy, text heavy, story heavy, lore heavy, chess-like card battle royale," while GameNOW stated that "As you get deeper into the game, the attack/defence system starts to make sense, and the whole play experience becomes very tense and strategic." GamePro had a mixed reaction to the gameplay, but ultimately said that it was "best appreciated by newcomers to the Yu-Gi-Oh game who want to learn how to play." Conversely, G4TV thought the game was "really freaking hard," while PGNx Media called it a "run-of-the-mill game." GameSpot compared the game negatively to the original trading card methods, saying "The presentation is terribly stripped-down, and as an odd duck sort of hybrid strategy game, it doesn't offer much accessibility or depth." Electronic Gaming Monthly called the game "surprisingly addictive" but found it to be a difficult experience to play.

Some critics thought The Duelists of the Roses was a letdown for the series. PSX Nation stated that the game was "strictly for fanboys, PS2 library completists, or masochists in search of a higher-than-normal threshold of pain in their interactive diet." Official PlayStation Magazine added that the game's difficulty was "ratcheted up so high" and "designed to make you feel like a total loser." Yahoo! gave it a negative review, writing that "When these sorts of loaded odds are all you get in lieu of a competitive computer player, the whole thing feels like you're being cheated rather than challenged."

=== Sales ===
Yu-Gi-Oh! The Duelists of the Roses was a commercial success. Between January 2000 and 2005, the game sold 68,420 copies in Japan, ranking as the 30th best-selling video game in the country. As of April 2020, it has sold a total of 76,248 units across the country. Despite its sales, it was the lowest-performing game in the Yu-Gi-Oh! series, selling fewer copies than Yu-Gi-Oh! Monster Capsule GB, which sold 129,095 units in Japan.

The Duelists of the Roses sold 859,966 units in the United States between January 2000 and 2005. By July 2006, the game sold 950,000 copies; Next Generation ranked it as the 60th highest-selling game launched for the PlayStation 2, Xbox, or GameCube between January 2000 and July 2006. By 2010, it had sold over 1.11 million copies throughout North America. Konami confirmed that the game sold 1.37 million units between the United States and Europe.
