= List of Yu-Gi-Oh! characters =

Colored illustration by Kazuki Takahashi, from Duel Art: Kazuki Takahashi Yu-Gi-Oh! Illustrations, featuring: Mokuba Kaiba (left bottom), Seto Kaiba (middle bottom), Serenity Wheeler and Ryo Bakura (middle left), Odion (top left), Marik Ishtar (top middle), Ishizu Ishtar (top right), Duke Devlin, Joey Wheeler and Tristan Taylor (middle), Mai Valentine and Téa Gardner (middle right), and Yugi Muto (bottom right). (Note: The 4Kids dub names are used in this description as the English version of Duel Art: Kazuki Takahashi Yu-Gi-Oh! Illustrations, published by Udon Entertainment, uses the dub names. The English translation of the actual manga by VIZ Media uses the original Japanese names for most human characters.)

The Yu-Gi-Oh! series, created by Kazuki Takahashi, features an extensive cast of characters, many of whom are from Domino City, a fictional city in Japan where the series takes place. As many plot elements are influenced by Egypt and its mythology, Egyptian characters appear in the story.

Yu-Gi-Oh! stars Yugi Mutou, a shy boy who loves games and is often bullied. After solving an ancient artifact known as the Millennium Puzzle, his body becomes the host of a mysterious spirit known as Dark Yugi, who has the personality of a gambler. When Yugi or his friends are threatened by those with darkness in their hearts, Dark Yugi reveals himself and challenges them to a "Shadow Game" (闇のゲーム, Yami no Gēmu; "Dark Games") that reveals the true nature of someone's heart, with their losers being subjected to a dark punishment called a "Penalty Game". Throughout the series, Yugi and his friends Katsuya Jonouchi (Joey Wheeler), Anzu Mazaki (Téa Gardner), Hiroto Honda (Tristan Taylor), and later Ryo Bakura learn that this other Yugi is the spirit of a nameless pharaoh from Ancient Egypt times who has lost his memories. As they attempt to help the Pharaoh regain his memories, they are put to the test, wagering their lives facing off against others who wield the mysterious Millennium Items and the dark power of the Shadow Games.

Most human characters in the English version of the original manga, published by VIZ Media, use their original Japanese names, while in other English Yu-Gi-Oh! media their names are changed. The Japanese names in Western order (given name before family name) and English manga names are listed first and the English anime names are listed second, when applicable. As well, the 4Kids English dub censors or edits instances of violence and sexual content, with characters being sent to the Shadow Realm rather than dying and some designs being changed.

== Main characters ==
=== Yugi Mutou ===
Voiced by: Megumi Ogata (1998–1999), Shunsuke Kazama (2000–present) (Japanese); Dan Green (4Kids) (English)

Yugi Mutou (武藤 遊戯, Mutō Yūgi; spelled "Muto" in the English anime; given name likely from 遊戯 (yūgi; 'game')) is the titular co-protagonist of the story. He wears the Millennium Puzzle (千年パズル, Sennen Pazuru), an ancient Egyptian artifact that is one of the seven Millennium Items and contains the spirit of an ancient Egyptian pharaoh. He initially fears this other personality, but over time comes to consider him a close friend. He also develops as a character and is able to defeat antagonists without Dark Yugi's help, proving that he is worthy of being chosen by the Millennium Puzzle.

His ace card is the "Dark Magician".

==== Dark Yugi ====
Voiced by: Megumi Ogata (1998–1999), Shunsuke Kazama (2000–present) (Japanese); Dan Green (4Kids) (English)

Dark Yugi (闇遊戯, Yami Yūgi; "Yami Yugi" in the English anime), true name Atem (アテム, Atemu), is the titular co-protagonist of the story. After Yugi solves the Millennium Puzzle, he comes to dwell in Yugi's body; when Yugi or his friends are in danger, he emerges from the Puzzle and takes over Yugi's body to protect them, challenging his opponents to Shadow Games and giving them a Penalty Game as punishment after defeating them or if they cheat. Throughout the series, he meets his eventual rival, Seto Kaiba, who he defeats in their first battle at school and during Death-T, and meets other wielders of the Millennium Items, including Shadi and Dark Bakura.

In the Duelist Kingdom arc, after Dark Yugi loses to Pegasus in a video tape duel when the timer runs out, Pegasus steals Sugoroku's soul to get him to come to the Duelist Kingdom, which he does in order to face him and save the stolen souls. There, he faces several opponents and then Kaiba in a duel utilizing his prototype Duel Disk, in which they each wager five star chips. After his Blue-Eyes Ultimate Dragon is defeated, Kaiba resorts to a suicide attack in order to win and Dark Yugi loses after Yugi intervenes to stop him from attacking Kaiba. Kaiba enters the castle, where Mai, who received extra star chips to repay Dark Yugi for saving her, helps him enter the castle. After defeating Mai, Dark Yugi faces Jonouchi, who defeated Keith. During the battle with Pegasus, Yugi and Dark Yugi come up with the "Mind Shuffle" tactic to prevent Pegasus from reading their minds, forcing Pegasus to start a Shadow Game that only those chosen by the Millennium Items can endure.

After Yugi collapses due to the Shadow Game's effects, Dark Yugi takes over and wins with help from Yugi and his friends, who block the Eye's powers. Afterwards, Pegasus complies with Dark Yugi's demand that he release the stolen souls while telling him that the Items contain an evil intelligence. As they leave the island, Yugi reassures Dark Yugi that, regardless of his origins, he is a valuable friend to them, and he begins his search to learn of his true identity and origins.

It is eventually revealed that he was originally Atem (アテム, Atemu), a pharaoh of Ancient Egypt who was the owner of the Millennium Puzzle, originally known as the Pendant, which he sealed himself and Zorc in following the destruction of Kul Elna. Though he moves on to the afterlife following his final duel with Yugi, in Yu-Gi-Oh! The Dark Side of Dimensions, he returns to help him fight Diva.

=== Katsuya Jonouchi ===
Voiced by: Toshiyuki Morikawa (1998–1999), Hiroki Takahashi (2000–present) (Japanese); Wayne Grayson (4Kids) (English)

Katsuya Jonouchi / Joseph "Joey" Wheeler (城之内 克也, Jōnouchi Katsuya) is Yugi's close friend. After Yugi stands up for him and Honda when Ushio beats them up, he realizes that he was jealous of Yugi's "treasure." That night, he retrieves the last piece of the Millennium Puzzle and returns it to Yugi's house, where Yugi completes it and challenges Ushio to the first Shadow Game of the series. Jonouchi is touched by Yugi's behavior and they become close friends, forming his own "treasure."

Though skilled at fistfighting and usually able to take on those bigger than himself, such as Bandit Keith, a fight which he loses in the Duel Monsters anime, he handicaps himself against opponents such as Bruce Ryu. Throughout the series, he becomes better at Domino and Duel Monsters with Yugi's help and learns to channel his anger into games instead of violence. He later participates in the Duelist Kingdom tournament for his sister and the Battle City tournament after suspecting that Kaiba is plotting something. Though kind and selfless, he can be immodest and rash and has a fear of the supernatural.

His ace card is the "Red-Eyes B. (Black) Dragon" after winning it from "Dinosaur" Ryuzaki (Rex Raptor) in Duelist Kingdom.

=== Anzu Mazaki ===
Voiced by: Yumi Kakazu (1998–1999), Maki Saitō (2000–present) (Japanese); Amy Birnbaum (4Kids) (English)

Anzu Mazaki / Téa Gardner (真崎 杏子, Mazaki Anzu) is Yugi's childhood best friend. She is athletic, supportive, has a strong school spirit, and has a crush on Dark Yugi. Though not as skilled at games as Yugi, she is knowledgeable of video game RPGs and used to defeat Jonouchi in school before he became a seasoned duelist. She secretly works at the fast food restaurant Burger World while dreaming of becoming a professional dancer in the United States. When Yugi and Jonouchi learn of these secrets when they follow her, after initially thinking she is participating in enjo kōsai, she comes to respect them for their willingness to support her and keep her secrets.

=== Hiroto Honda ===
Voiced by: Ryōtarō Okiayu (1998–1999), Takayuki Kondō (2000–2001, 2016), Hidehiro Kikuchi (2001–2004) (Japanese); Sam Riegel (eps. 1–10), Greg Abbey (eps. 11-224/other media; eps. 1–9 uncut dub) (English)

Hiroto Honda / Tristan Taylor (本田 ヒロト, Honda Hiroto) is a student of class 1-B at Domino High School who befriends Yugi, Jonouchi, Anzu, and Bakura. In the manga, he starts out as Jonouchi's street thug friend and has a crush on Miho Nosaka. In the Toei anime, he is the head of the school's beautician department, who dislikes Yugi despite him rescuing him and Jonouchi from Ushio. After confessing his love for Miho Nosaka to Jonouchi, he convinces him to ask Yugi for help in writing a love letter to her in the form of a puzzle. When Ms. Chono confiscates the puzzle and threatens to punish Miho if the secret admirer does not come clean, Yugi and Jonouchi stand up for him by claiming that they wrote it. Ms. Chono decides to put the puzzle together to find out who the sender is, but Dark Yugi secretly turns it into a Shadow Game, shattering her pretty face as the Penalty Game. Afterwards, Honda befriends Yugi, despite Miho later turning him down when he asks her out directly.

In the Duel Monsters anime, he has a crush on Joey (Jonouchi)'s sister Serenity (Shizuka) and a rivalry with Duke (Ryuji), often competing with him for Serenity's affections.

=== Ryo Bakura ===
Voiced by: Tsutomu Kashiwakura (1998), Yusuke Numata (game), Yō Inoue (2000–2001), Rica Matsumoto (2001–present) (Japanese); Ted Lewis (4Kids) (English)

Ryo Bakura (獏良 了, Bakura Ryō) is a transfer student who befriends the group and is interested in games, particularly tabletop role-playing games like Monster World (モンスター・ワールド, Monsutā Wārudo). He is the holder of the Millennium Ring (千年輪, Sennen Ringu) and has a dark spirit dwelling within him, much like with Yugi and Dark Yugi. Prior to his introduction to the story, Bakura's mother and sister, Amane, died in a car accident and he often transferred schools and isolated himself because Dark Bakura's Penalty Games trapped his friends' souls in RPG miniature figures, causing them to fall into comas. With help from Yugi and his friends, they defeat Dark Bakura in a Shadow Game of Monster World, after which he joins them. Despite the danger it poses, Bakura continues to hold onto the Millennium Ring due to being curious about its history. This, along with his trusting and innocent nature, sometimes cause conflict and allows Dark Bakura to continually possess him without his knowledge.

In the Toei anime, Miho has a crush on him. In the Duel Monsters anime, his role in the group is reduced compared to the manga, as he is mostly being controlled by Dark Bakura and does not accompany them as often. He is introduced during the Duelist Kingdom arc as someone they knew from school and his love for tabletop role-playing games and making occult decks is downplayed.

His voice uses a British accent in the 4Kids version.

=== Seto Kaiba ===
Voiced by: Hikaru Midorikawa (1998–1999), Kenjirō Tsuda (2000–present, teenager), Kiyomi Yazaki (2000–2004, child) (Japanese); Eric Stuart (4Kids) (English)

Seto Kaiba (海馬 瀬人, Kaiba Seto) is Yugi's rival and the current president and CEO of the Kaiba Corporation, introduced as a prodigious, cold-hearted gamer willing to do whatever it takes to achieve his goals, but had a troubled childhood because of his adoptive father Gozaboro. After learning that Sugoroku possesses the "Blue-Eyes White Dragon" card, he steals the card from Yugi and duels Dark Yugi, who defeats him and gives him the "Experience of Death" Penalty Game. Following his defeat, Kaiba, unable to forget the Penalty Game that he experienced, plans to use Death-T to enact revenge and kill him. He duels Dark Yugi again and loses, receiving the "Mind Crush" Penalty Game to temporarily shatter his heart and purge it of evil, leaving him in a coma for almost a year. Despite being reformed, Kaiba retains his arrogance and rivalry with Dark Yugi. While he leaves the story following the Battle City arc, he is a major character in the anime and, in Yu-Gi-Oh! GX, is the founder of Duel Academy.

In the manga, he creates Solid Vision during the events of Death-T, which is expanded on in the manga Transcend Game and film The Dark Side of Dimensions; in the latter, he attempts to bring back Atem in order to settle the score between them. Kaiba uses a "Blue-Eyes" deck and his ace monster is "Blue-Eyes White Dragon".

=== Mokuba Kaiba ===
Voiced by: Katsue Miwa (1998), Junko Noda (game), Junko Takeuchi (2000–present) (Japanese); Tara Sands (4Kids, 2001–2005, 2017), Carrie Keranen (4Kids, 2005–2006) (English)

Mokuba Kaiba (海馬 モクバ, Kaiba Mokuba) is Seto Kaiba's younger brother, who is an expert at Capsule Monster Chess (カプセルモンスターチェス, Kapuseru Monsutā Chesu). In the manga, Mokuba is characterized as a spoiled brat who often tries to trick Yugi to get back at him for defeating Kaiba. He tries to defeat Yugi before Kaiba can, threatening to cut off Yugi's fingers if he wins, and poisons Jonouchi before challenging him and Yugi to a Russian Roulette Dinner of Death (死の料理・ロシアンルーレット, Shi no Ryōri Roshian Rūretto). In the Duel Monsters anime, Mokuba is devoted to Kaiba and less violent, as he is not committed to avenging Seto's defeat and befriends Yugi's group after Yugi's friends rescue him.

=== Miho Nosaka ===
Voiced by: Yukana

Miho Nosaka (anime) / Melody (video game) (野坂 ミホ, Nosaka Miho) is a one-shot minor character in the manga who appears as a major character in the Toei anime. In the manga, she is a classmate of Yugi and his friends, and Domino City High's student librarian. Honda has a crush on her and attempts to pass a love note to her in the form of a jigsaw puzzle. When Ms. Chono intercepts the note, Dark Yugi foils her attempts to embarrass Honda. When Honda asks Miho directly, she turns him down; despite this, Honda befriends with Yugi and joins the group. In the Toei anime, Miho, who identifies herself in the third-person, is Yugi and Anzu's friend and is cheerful, kind, and loves her friends and all things cute; though she has crushes on many male cast members throughout the series, despite his love for her, she is not interested in Honda except as a friend. Though stubborn and manipulative, she will not hesitate to protect her friends, like when Warashibe poisons Anzu, Honda, and Jonouchi and when she resolves to fight for Honda's sake after believing him to have died. After learning that he is alive, she teams up with Jonouchi to fight against Ryuichi Fuwa and Aileen Rao, both of whom are keeping Honda and Sugoroku captive under Kaiba's orders.

Miho is not present in the Duel Monsters anime. However in the spin-off/sequel Yu-Gi-Oh! GX, her name is listed as one of Trueman's victims that were taken to the World of Darkness until they were freed by Jaden Yuki.

== Antagonists ==
=== Dark Bakura ===
Voiced by: Tsutomu Kashiwakura (1998), Yō Inoue (2000–2001), Rica Matsumoto (2001–2004, 2016) (Japanese); Ted Lewis (4Kids) (English)

Dark Bakura / Yami Bakura (闇獏良, Yami Bakura) is the main antagonist of the series. He is a dark spirit dwelling in the Millennium Ring who seeks the Millennium items to open the Door of Darkness and gain evil power, possessing Bakura's body due to lacking one himself. His Penalty Games trapping his friends' souls in figures caused him to constantly transfer schools until, with help from Yugi and the group in the Toei anime, they temporarily purge Dark Bakura's influence on Bakura by defeating the final boss of Monster World, Dark Master Zorc (闇の支配者ダーク・マスターゾーク, Dāku Masutā Zōku). However, when they are trapped in the labyrinth beneath Duelist Kingdom, Dark Bakura convinces him to put the Millennium Ring on again by claiming that he has undergone a change of heart. With Bakura's friends unaware of this, Dark Bakura helps Dark Yugi in his game, which is designed to outwit the Meikyuu Brothers' trickery, and they return to the surface.

Though he aids the group while trying to gain their trust and seemingly allowing Bakura more control over his body, unbeknownst to them, he killed Pegasus by tearing the Millennium Eye out of his eye socket and took it for himself. His true nature is revealed during the Dungeon Dice Monsters arc; after supporting Yugi during the game against Ryuji and helping him retrieve the pieces of the shattered Millennium Puzzle, he secretly puts part of his soul into one of the pieces to uncover the True Door from within. He intends to manipulate events until the Millennium Items have been gathered in preparation for the Dark Role-Playing Game / Dark RPG (闇・R・P・Gロール・プレイング・ゲーム, Yami Ā Pī Jī (Yami Rōru Pureingu Gēmu)), with the goal of opening the Door of Darkness and unleashing the darkness sealed in the Puzzle. Unbeknownst to Bakura, later in the manga he takes over his body when he has the opportunity to further his goals.

During the final arc, Dark Bakura is revealed to have been created when the soul of Thief King Bakura (盗賊王バクラ, Tōzoku Ō Bakura), the sole survivor of the Kul Elna massacre who sought revenge against Egypt by attempting to steal the Millennium Items, merged with a fragment of Zorc Necrophades when they were sealed in the Millennium Ring. He is killed when Dark Yugi summons Horakthy, the Creator of Light, to destroy Zorc. In the anime, he dies due to being a part of Zorc and merging with him during the final battle, while in the manga, he dies due to his life being linked to Zorc and Akhenaden, who is destroyed by the light of the Blue-Eyes.

=== Maximillion J. Pegasus ===
Voiced by: Jiro Takasugi (Japanese); Darren Dunstan (4Kids) (English)

Pegasus J. Crawford / Maximillion Pegasus (ペガサス・J・クロフォード, Pegasasu Jei Kurofōdo) is the eccentric American chairman of Industrial Illusions and creator of the game Duel Monsters (デュエル モンスターズ, Dyueru Monsutāzu) (originally Magic & Wizards (M&W (マジック&ウィザーズ), Majikku ando Wizāzu)). He is the wielder of the Millennium Eye (千年眼, ミレニアムアイ, Sennen Gan, Mireniamu Ai). He is known as "Maximillion J. Pegasus" in the English manga.

In the manga, his story about meeting Shadi and the supposed "evil intelligence" of the Millennium Items prompts Dark Yugi's search for his origins. During his final Shadow Game with Yugi, he tells him of his discovery of an ancient Egyptian Shadow Game during his travels in the Valley of the Kings, which inspired his creation of Duel Monsters and of card games in general. He plays a key role in the Duel Monsters anime, where he, as the creator of Duel Monsters and the discoverer of their ancient Egyptian roots, possesses knowledge of the game and its origins.

Pegasus serves as the fourth main antagonist of the manga and the first main antagonist of the Duel Monsters anime. In the anime, he challenges Yugi to a Shadow Game to force him to come to his tournament Duelist Kingdom (決闘者の王国(デュエリストキングダム), Dyuerisuto Kingudamu) and face him, taking Sugoroku's soul and trapping it in a Soul Prison Duel Monsters card as a Penalty Game for losing the timed match to ensure this. He also kidnaps Mokuba to convince Kaiba to come to the Kingdom, later capturing their souls. In flashbacks, Pegasus is revealed to have had a lover, Cyndia (シンディア, Shindia) (Cecelia in the English anime dub), who died after her seventeenth birthday or after their marriage in the anime, and sought to resurrect her. At the end of the arc, Yugi and Dark Yugi defeat him in a final game of Duel Monsters and he releases the stolen souls. Soon after, Dark Bakura murders him and takes the Millennium Eye for himself. In the manga, he is reunited with Cecelia in the afterlife, while in the Duel Monsters anime he instead fell ill.

He uses a "Toon" deck, which uses Toon World to make Toon versions of his monsters. His ace monster is Relinquished.

=== Mr. Clown ===
Mr. Clown (MRクラウン / 御伽父, Misutā Kuraun / Otogi-chichi), known as Sindin the Clown in the Dungeon Dice Monsters video game, is an antagonist who appears in the manga. He is the owner of the Black Clown (ブラック・クラウン, Burakku Kuraun) game shop, located across the street from Sugoroku's Kame Game shop. In the past, Sugoroku took him in as a disciple and they eventually challenged each other for ownership of the Millennium Puzzle in a Shadow Game called the Devil's Board Game. After losing the game, the Penalty Game caused him to age fifty years in a single night and he sought revenge through his son Ryuji. He appears in The Dark Side of Dimensions, a film set in the manga continuity, where he opens a cafe with Ryuji after Black Clown burns down.

=== Marik Ishtar ===
Voiced by: Tetsuya Iwanaga (teenager), Akiko Kimura (child) (Japanese); Jonathan Todd Ross (4Kids) (English)

Marik Ishtar (マリク・イシュタール, Mariku Ishutāru) is the heir to a clan of tombkeepers and Ishizu Ishtar's younger brother, who disregarded his duties and turned to crime because of his hatred for the Pharaoh. When he was a child, he developed a split personality as a result of trauma after undergoing the tombkeeper's initiation ritual, which involved carving into his body with a hot dagger, and his isolated upbringing. After breaking one of the clan's laws, his dark personality emerged and murdered his father. However, his adoptive older brother Rishid sealed his dark side away, leaving him with no memory of his actions and believing the Pharaoh to be responsible for his father's death. He became obsessed with killing the Pharaoh to avenge his father and end his clan's suffering. To this end, he founded the Rare Hunters, a gang of thieves who steal and collect rare Duel Monsters cards, and uses his Millennium Rod to control people's minds. Though innocent and kind as a child, he became cruel and uncaring, killing his servants when they fail him and deriving pleasure from hurting others.

==== Dark Marik ====
Voiced by: Tetsuya Iwanaga (Japanese); Jonathan Todd Ross (4Kids) (English)

Dark Marik / Yami Marik (闇マリク, Yami Mariku) is a dark personality within Marik, who was created through his pain and suffering and serves as the main antagonist of the Battle City Tournament saga. To prevent him from emerging, Rishid carved marks into his own face. However, when Marik's father tortured Rishid as punishment for allowing Marik and his sister Ishizu to break one of the clan's laws, Dark Marik emerged and murdered him (sent him to the Shadow Realm in the 4Kids version), beginning Marik's quest for vengeance against the Pharaoh.

Dark Marik enjoys violence and the suffering of others and only cares for his own survival, attempting to destroy the mind of the regular Marik to have sole possession of their body. While he is connected to the Millennium Rod, he differs from Dark Yugi and Dark Bakura in that he exists independently from Marik. During the Battle City Tournament Semi-Finals, Dark Marik reemerges and takes control of Marik's body after Rishid falls unconscious as a result of being unworthy to control Ra's power during his duel with Jonouchi. He is destroyed after Marik surrenders to Yugi.

=== Yako Tenma ===
Yako Tenma (天馬 夜行, Tenma Yakō) appears in Yu-Gi-Oh! R. He is Maximillion Pegasus's protégé and adopted son, who seeks revenge for his death.

=== Akhenadin ===
Voiced by: Hitoshi Bifu (#201–212), Kōji Ishii (#213–214) (Japanese); Oliver Wyman (4Kids) (English)

Priest Akhenaden (神官アクナディン, Shinkan Akunadin) is the guardian of the Millennium Eye and King Ahknemkhanen's brother. As they grew up, he was secretly jealous of his brother's position as pharaoh. Using the Shadow Alchemy inscribed in the Millennium Spellbook / Millennium Tome (千年魔術書, Sennen Majutsu Sho), he secretly ordered the massacre at the village of Kul Elna, using their blood and corpses, which he melted into gold, to create the Millennium Items to defend his brother's kingdom. To protect his family from those seeking revenge, he abandoned his wife and his son, Seto, who became a priest of Pharaoh Atem's court, but Akhenaden kept their relationship a secret. After seeing that Seto flourished after he abandoned him, he aimed to see him achieve power. Through Zorc's influence within the Millennium Eye, which is awoken after Thief King Bakura puts part of his soul in it, he becomes convinced that he must kill the Pharaoh and makes a contract with Zorc to become the High Priest of Darkness (闇の大神官, Yami no Daishinkan).

In the manga, Akhenaden's soul merged with Zorc after they were sealed in the Millennium Puzzle along with Atem before being released during the final arc. His mummy is used as a second player on Dark Bakura's side of the Shadow RPG, influencing his own playing piece as part of the game's recreation of the events before his soul is vanquished after Atem wins the game; the skull of his mummy splitting in half upon defeat. In the Duel Monsters anime, his mind is corrupted after Dark Bakura puts part of his soul in the Millennium Eye and he is granted power from Zorc after gathering the Millennium Items, transforming into the High Priest of Darkness. Seto later kills him physically, with Kisara in her White Dragon form killing him for good when he enters Seto's mind to kill the Pharaoh. His purified soul (reverted to his age from the moment he first used the Millennium Eye) is later seen alongside his brother on the other side of the door to the afterlife as Atem walks through it.

=== Zorc Necrophades ===
Voiced by: Yoshitaka Kaidu (Japanese); Mike Pollock (4Kids) (English)

Zorc Necrophades (大邪神 ゾーク・ネクロファデス, Dai Jashin Zōku Nekurofadesu) is a destroyer of worlds born from the darkness in humans' hearts and, in the English dub, the creator of the Shadow Realm. He was summoned by Akhenaden through the power of the Millennium Items to attack the kingdom and killed Atem's advisers. He is the final boss of Memory World, where, with help from Yugi and his friends, Atem defeats him and prevents his resurrection, freeing Bakura from the Millennium Ring in the process. Dark Bakura was born from the merging of Zorc and Thief King Bakura's souls, and, in the manga, an entity made of their souls who calls himself Zorc Necrophades, High Priest of Darkness, appears.

=== Minor antagonists ===
Death-T (DEATH-T（死のテーマパーク）, Theme Park of Death)
A deranged theme park which Kaiba creates to kill Yugi.
Kaiba Manor Butler (manga)/ Daimon (anime) / Hobson (海馬邸執事 / 大門, Kaiba Tei Shitsuji)
Voiced by: Ryūji Saikachi (1998), Jin Nishimura (2000) (Japanese); Ted Lewis (4Kids) (English)
The guide of the Horror Zone in Death T-2, who welcomes Yugi and Jonouchi to Kaiba Manor prior to Kaiba Land's opening. After Mokuba has him prepare six meals, including two poisoned ones, for his rigged game of Russian Roulette Dinner with Yugi and Jonouchi. However, after the game backfires and Mokuba is poisoned, he comes to his aid. In the manga, he dies during Death-T. In the anime, he is Gozaburo's butler.
Chopman (チョップマン, Choppuman)
A serial killer who appears in the manga as one of the traps at Death-T. In the past, he murdered ten boy scouts at a camp near Domino Lake. The news of the murders caused fear throughout Domino City; the suspect came to be known as "The Chopman", but was not captured.

==== Laser Tag Assassins ====
The Laser Tag Assassins are three professional mercenaries who Kaiba hires to kill Yugi and his friends in the Shooting Stardust (シューティング・スターダスト, Shūtingu Sutādasuto) game.

Johnny Gale (ジョニー・ゲイル, Jonī Geiru)
A former Green Beret commander who specialized in guerrilla warfare.
Bob McGuire (ボブ・マクガイア, Bobu Makugaia)
A former SWAT team leader who specialized in long distance sniping.
Name unknown / Mysterious Assassin (謎のアサシン, Nazo no Asashin)
A former hitman who KaibaCorp hired.

==== Pegasus's servants ====
Mr. Crocketts / Croquet (クロケッツ, Misutā Kurokettsu)
Voiced by: Yoshikazu Nagano (Japanese); Ted Lewis (4Kids) (English)
The right-hand man and butler of Pegasus. In the manga, Kaiba takes him hostage and holds him at gunpoint in the guestroom, threatening to kill him if Pegasus does not show himself.
Saruwatari / Kemo (猿渡, Saruwatari)
Voiced by: Masahiro Okazaki (Japanese); Eric Stuart (English)
A man who works for the Kaiba Brothers as one of their private bodyguards during the Death-T arc. In reality, he was working for Industrial Illusions, gathering information from within KaibaCorp and giving it to Pegasus. During Pegasus' tournament, Saruwatari is in charge of taking the eliminated players to the boat leaving Pegasus' island. In a filler arc, Saruwatari works for the Big Five and is sent to shut down the virtual reality pods that Yugi, Jonouchi, and Mokuba were using, but leaves after they exit the game. Saruwatari reappears in the Yu-Gi-Oh! R spin-off manga and the 1999 movie, where he kidnaps unwilling invitees to Kaiba's tournament before Jonouchi stops him from forcing Shougo to enter.

==== Player Killers ====
The Player Killers / Eliminators (プレイヤーキラー, Pureiyā Kirā) are duelists who Pegasus hires during the Duelist Kingdom tournament to challenge contestants to duels and take their Star Chips, ensuring that they do not reach the finals and that he will become the world's number one duelist and fit to be KaibaCorp's new CEO.

Ventriloquist of the Dead (死者の腹話術師, Shisha no Fukuwajutsūshi)
The first Player Killer that Yugi and his friends encounter, who Saruwatari hired to defeat Yugi. He controls a puppet that resembles Kaiba and uses his stolen deck. After he is defeated, Dark Yugi inflicts the Penalty Game "Puppet Illusion" on him, trapping him in an illusion where a puppet of himself attacks him.
Ghost Kaiba / Mimic of Doom (死の物真似師, Shinomono Maneshi)
Voiced by: Tony Hirota (Japanese); Eric Stuart (disguised form), Wayne Grayson (true form) (both 4Kids) (English)
An obese shape-shifter hired to defeat Yugi. After being defeated, he vanishes after Dark Yugi uses a Mind Crush. He proclaims himself as the evil side of Seto Kaiba's heart that Dark Yugi banished to the Shadow Realm. He replaces the role of the Ventriloquist of the Dead in the anime adaption.
Player Killer of Darkness / PaniK (「闇」のプレイヤーキラー, "Yami" no Pureiyā Kirā)
Voiced by: Holly Kaneko (Japanese); David Moo (English)
The second Player Killer that the group encounters, who steals Mai's star chips. When Dark Yugi intends to bet his own life to even out the stakes and win back Mai's star chips, he ties a noose around his neck and threatens to kill him once he wins. Because of this, Dark Yugi turns the duel into a Shadow Game. After the Player Killer loses the Shadow Game, Dark Yugi inflicts the "Darkness of Naraku" Penalty Game on him, where he imagines himself being hung from the gallows over the abyss. In the anime, the penalty of the game is changed so that fire is shot at the loser. When the Player Killer attempts to do this to Dark Yugi even after losing, Dark Yugi's magic shields him from harm. He then performs a Mind Crush on the Player Killer, and Mai's star chips are returned to her. His ace monster is King of Yamimakai.
Meikyu Brothers / Paradox Brothers (迷宮兄弟, Meikyū Kyōdai)
Mei/Para Voiced by: Takashi Matsuyama (Mei) (Japanese); Sam Riegel (ep. 19), Jerry Lobozzo (ep. 20–21) (both 4Kids) (English)
Kyu/Dox Voiced by: Hitoshi Nishimura (Japanese); Marc Thompson (English)
The last set of Player Killers the group meet within the underground maze of Duelist Kingdom. They challenge Yugi and Jonouchi to a tag-battle game, a hybrid of Duel Monsters and a maze game. After losing, the group must choose the correct path or else they will be stuck in the underground labyrinth. In reality, both doors are correct and the brothers are able to change the correct door at will. Their trickery is outed by Dark Yugi's Labyrinth Coin (迷宮コイン, Meikyū Koin) game, with help from Dark Bakura in the manga, and the group returns to the surface. Their ace monster is Gate Guardian.

==== Ghouls ====
Ghouls / Rare Hunters (グールズ, Gūruzu) are a group of card thieves that serve Marik, whom Dark Yugi and Kaiba refer to as the "Ghouls of the Gaming Underworld". They provide Marik with a supply of minions, rare cards, and money by stealing and selling rare cards from duelists.

Rare Hunter / Seeker (レアハンター, Reahantā)
Voiced by: David Wills (4Kids)
The first Ghoul to appear, who Marik dispatched upon learning from the card shop owner that gave Jonouchi his Duel Disk that he owns the rare Red-Eyes Black Dragon. He uses a deck that focuses on making a complete hand of counterfeit Exodia cards. After Dark Yugi destroys his strategy and wins the duel, Marik uses his Millennium Rod to take over Rare Hunter's mind to introduce himself to Yugi, after which he is seemingly killed.
Pandora / Arkana (パンドラ, Pandora)
Voiced by: Takehito Koyasu (Japanese); Sam Riegel (4Kids) (English)
The second Ghoul. He was a magician whose mother died when he was young. After one of his escape tricks went wrong, he was disfigured around the eyes and his sadness drove away his fiancee Catherine. While wandering around with a bandaged head, Marik approached him and offered to reunite him with Catherine. Following Seeker's failure, Arkana is dispatched to challenge Dark Yugi to a death game in which their legs are shackled and buzzsaws threaten to saw off the loser's legs. After he is defeated by Yugi's Dark Magician Girl, Yugi saves him from the buzzsaws and he goes to where Catherine was supposed to be, only to find that she was actually a mannequin.
Pantomimer / Strings (パントマイマー, Pantomaimā)
Voiced by: Jonathan Todd Ross (4Kids)
The third Ghoul, who first appears before Bakura, Anzu, and Sugoroku in the park. Marik uses him as a puppet in an attempt to kill Yugi before arriving in Battle City. He wields Slifer the Sky Dragon and uses a combination of Revival Jam with "Jam Defender" and "Infinite Cards" to power Slifer the Sky Dragon, but is defeated after Yugi uses "Brain Control".
Mask of Light / Lumis (光の仮面, Hikari no Kamen)
Voiced by: Yū Mizushima (Japanese); Jimmy Zoppi (4Kids) (English)
One member of a duo of Ghouls who challenge Dark Yugi and Kaiba to a tag-team death game where the loser sets off a bomb near their side of the glass ceiling and will fall to their death. However, they survive after being defeated due to being equipped with parachutes. His ace monster is Masked Beast Des Gardius.
Mask of Darkness / Umbra (闇の仮面, Yami no Kamen)
Voiced by: Kōji Ishii (Japanese); Andrew Paull (4Kids) (English)
One member of a duo of Ghouls who challenge Dark Yugi and Kaiba to a tag-team death game where the loser sets off a bomb near their side of the glass ceiling and will fall to their death. However, they survive after being defeated due to being equipped with parachutes. His ace monster is The Masked Beast.

=== Filler antagonists ===
Siegfried von Schroeder / Zigfried von Schroeder (ジークフリード・フォン・シュレイダー, Jīkufurīdo fon Shureidā)
Voiced by: Eisuke Tsuda (Japanese); Pete Zaraustica (4Kids) (English)
The CEO of Schroeder Corp, a long-time rival to the Kaiba family and the Kaiba Corporation. When Siegfried and Kaiba become heads of their respective family companies, they create holographic systems for Duel Monsters, with Siegfried's invention being the Holographic Duel Box Room System. However, he falls into ruin after Kaiba markets and patents his invention first and seeks to destroy the Kaiba Corporation. After discovering that his younger brother Leon is a successful duelist, he takes interest in him and manipulates him to destroy Kaiba. Siegfried joins the KC Grand Prix to discredit Kaiba and claim revenge, using computer viruses in an attempt to destroy Kaiba Corporation's computer systems before Kaiba stops them and expels Siegfried from the tournament. When Leon faces Yugi in the finals, he attempts to use him to destroy Kaiba Corp, but fails, as Leon did not want to use cheating to win. After his defeat, they reconcile and Leon promises to help rebuild their family's company.

==== Kaiba family ====
Gozaburo Kaiba (海馬 剛三郎, Kaiba Gōzaburō)
Voiced by: Unsho Ishizuka (1998), Tetsuo Komura (2002) (Japanese); David Wills (Seasons 3-4), Ted Lewis (Season 5) (all 4Kids) (English)
A selfish and power-hungry businessman and Seto and Mokuba's adoptive father. He was the original founder and CEO of Kaiba Corporation, which began as an arms manufacturer, when he was a chess champion. When Gozaburo visited the orphanage where he and Mokuba were living, he challenged Gozaburo to a game of chess, with the stakes being the adoption of the two brothers. After Seto won by cheating, Gozaburo adopted him and Mokuba, forcing Seto to spend his time studying to groom him into becoming his heir. However, Gozaburo's plans backfired when he gave Seto a 2% share of Kaiba Corporation's stock as a test, challenging him to pay back ten times the amount within a year. Seto managed to acquire the money within a single day and, along with the board of director, secured majority control of the company stocks and became the new CEO after overthrowing Gozaburo, who committed suicide by defenestration. In the Toei anime, he instead suffers a heart attack. In the Duel Monsters anime, he is the major antagonist of the "Virtual World" arc. His ace monster is Exodia Necross.
Noa Kaiba (海馬 乃亜, Kaiba Noa) / Noah Kaiba
Voiced by: Chisa Yokoyama (Japanese); Andrew Rannells (4Kids) (English)
Gozaburo's biological son and Seto and Mokuba's adoptive brother. As the heir to the Kaiba Corporation, Noah's father made him study in the arts and academics, but, unlike Seto, he enjoyed it and was eager to please his father. When Noah was around ten years old, he was fatally injured in a car accident, after which Gozaburo uploaded his soul onto a supercomputer before Seto was adopted. In the present, he kidnaps Yugi and the group and traps them in his Virtual World. His ace monster is Shinato, King of a Higher Plane.

==== The Big Five ====
The Big Five were originally the executives for Kaiba Corporation, who were swayed to Kaiba's side. After Kaiba was victorious, he shut down their factories and re-established Kaiba Corporation as a gaming company. This caused the Big Five to resent him, and they allied with Pegasus in a plan to allow Pegasus to claim control over KaibaCorp. In the manga, they are fired following Pegasus' defeat.

In the anime, Kaiba fires them as they offer a peace offering in the form of a virtual reality game. After he becomes trapped in the game, Mokuba enlists Yugi and the group for help. The Big Five program Witty Phantom to oversee Kaiba's sacrifice for a ritual that would summon Five-Headed Dragon. After Kaiba is saved and Saruwatari is sent to deactivate the virtual reality pods, the Big Five reprogram the game so that Five-Headed Dragon can appear and activate the Dragon Seal so that only dragon monsters can fight. After Jonouchi, Mai, and Mokuba are defeated, Yugi and Kaiba combine Black Luster Soldier and Blue Eyes Ultimate Dragon to form Dragon Master Knight, which destroys the Five-Headed Dragon. After Yugi, Jonouchi, and Mokuba exit the game, Saruawatari and his men leave to beat Kaiba to the Big Five.

In the "Virtual World" arc, the Big Five's minds are separated from their bodies and they are trapped in Kaiba Corporation's cyberspace until they are found by Noah Kaiba, who offered them a chance to gain new bodies. They challenge Yugi and the group, but are defeated and deleted. In the English dub, they are imprisoned in the different corners of the virtual world, which are later destroyed.

Konosuke Oshita / Gansley
Voiced by: Nobuyuki Saitō, Shintaro Sonooka (Japanese); Eric Stuart ("Duelist Kingdom" and "Legendary Heroes" arc), Marc Thompson ("Virtual World" arc) (all 4Kids) (English)
The former vice-president of business strategy at Kaiba Corp and the founder of the Big Five. He is the oldest of the group. In the Virtual World arc, his Deck Master was Deepsea Warrior.
Shuzo Otaki / Adrian Randolph Crump III
Voiced by: Satoshi Tsuruoka, Ryōsuke Ōtani (Japanese); Robert O'Gorman (4Kids) (English)
A former manager of Kaiba Corporation's personnel, who was an accountant and chief financial officer for Kaiba Corp. In the virtual world, his Deck Master was Nightmare Penguin. His position and deck master were based on his dream of an all-penguin theme park, which Kaiba turned down.
Chikuzen Oka / Johnson
Voiced by: Shinichi Yashiro (Japanese); Wayne Grayson ("Duelist Kingdom" and "Legendary Heroes" arc), Andrew Paull ("Virtual World" arc) (all 4Kids) (English)
A former expert lawyer and chief legal officer for Kaiba Corporation. In the virtual world, his Deck Master was Judge Man.
Soichiro Ota / Nesbitt
Voiced by: Hiroomi Sugino (Japanese); David Wills (4Kids) (English)
A former engineer and chief technical officer at Kaiba Corporation. In the virtual world, his Deck Master was Robotic Knight. He seeks to take revenge on Kaiba for forcing him to destroy his weapons and replace them with video games.
Kogoro Daimon / Lector
Voiced by: Eiji Takemoto, Hisashi Izumi (Japanese); Tom Souhrada (4Kids) (English)

The former right-hand man of Gozaburo and later Seto, who was next in line to become CEO after Gozaburo. However, Seto took his title and left Daimon as little more than company consultant and figurehead. In the virtual world, his Deck Master was Jinzo.

==== Doma / Paradius ====
An organization who attempted to take over the world using the Orichalcos.

Dartz (ダーツ, Dātsu)
Voiced by: Yū Emao (Japanese); Wayne Grayson (4Kids) (English)
The former King of Atlantis and the head of the organization Paradius. He was corrupted after being forced to kill his wife, who had been turned into a monster by the orichalcos, which turned his right eye green. Dartz led the forces of the Orichalcos against his father, daughter, and the forces of the Dominion of the Beasts, but was defeated. He spent the next ten thousand years collecting souls to revive the Leviathan, which he believed could be revived using Atem's soul. His ace monster is Divine Serpent Geh.
Rafael (ラフェール, Rafēru)
Voiced by: Yoshihisa Kawahara (Japanese); Marc Thompson (4Kids) (English)
The strongest of Dartz's henchmen and the duelist sent to defeat Atem and Yugi. After he was trapped in an accident while on an ocean cruise, he was stranded on a deserted island. With only his duelling deck to keep him company, Rafael developed a deep bond with them before he was rescued by Dartz, who was responsible for his tragic past. His ace monster is Guardian Dreadscythe.
Amelda / Alister (アメルダ, Ameruda)
Voiced by: Yukinara Iemura (Japanese); Ted Lewis (4Kids) (English)
Dartz's second henchman. As a child, he lived in a town during a war and led a resistance group with his brother after their hometown was attacked by soldiers armed by Gozaburo, which resulted in his brother being kidnapped. Since then, Alister began to seek revenge on Kaiba while being unaware that Dartz is behind ruining his life. His ace monster is Air Fortress Ziggurat.
Valon (ヴァロン, Varon)
Voiced by: Takeshi Maeda (Japanese); Marc Thompson (4Kids) (English)
Dartz's third henchman. In the past, he was sent to the detention center by Dartz because he framed Valon for an unspecified crime, but Dartz tricked him in order to make Valon his henchman. He develops feelings for Mai and seeks to defeat Jonouchi for defeating her and destroying her sense of worth as a duelist. He uses the 'Armor' deck. He wears his Armor monsters and fights the opponent with his own hands.

=== Film antagonists ===
Anubis (アヌビス, Anubisu)
Voiced by: Kōji Ishii (Japanese); Scottie Ray (4Kids) (English)
The main antagonist of Yu-Gi-Oh! The Movie: Pyramid of Light, who was sealed inside the titular artifact and a card after Atem defeated him a millennium ago before awakening after Yugi solves the Millennium Puzzle. He controls Seto by having him play the "Pyramid of Light" while using the "Andro Sphinx" and "Sphinx Teleia" cards, whose destruction can summon "Theinen the Great Sphinx" along with paying 500 lifepoints. In the Japanese version of the movie, Anubis seeks revenge by using the King of Light (Kaiba) to defeat the King of Darkness (Dark Yugi) to revive Anubis, the King of Destruction, and then use Kaiba to become the new king and rule the world. However, Yugi stops his plans and he is killed by the "Blue-Eyes Shining Dragon".
Paradox (パラドックス, Paradokkusu)
Voiced by: Atsushi Tamura (Japanese); Sean Schemmel (4Kids) (English)
The main antagonist of Yu-Gi-Oh! 3D: Bonds Beyond Time. He is one of Iliaster's Four Stars of Destruction and a Turbo Duelist, who seeks to save his own time by traveling across time and space to destroy the history of Duel Monsters, but ends up causing damage to the timeline. He faces Yugi, Jaden, and Yusei Fudo in a duel, but is defeated and returns to his time, having regained hope for the future. He uses a "Malefic" deck, which consists of stolen Duel Monster cards. He also appears in a flashback in Yu-Gi-Oh! 5D's.
Diva (ディーヴァ, Dīva)
Voiced by: Kento Hayashi (Japanese); Daniel J. Edwards (4Kids) (English)
The main antagonist of Yu-Gi-Oh!: The Dark Side of Dimensions. He lived in Egypt with his sister Sera and Mani and were mentored by Shadi, who taught them about the Millennium Items, telling them that three represented evil, three represented justice, and the seventh, the Millennium Puzzle, represented both justice and evil. He also told them that when the Items are gathered together, a door to a better world would open, which they could enter because they had been chosen. Before being killed by Dark Bakura, Shadi gave Diva the Quantum Cube (量子キューブ, Ryōshi Kyūbu), whose power allows him to erase people or transport them to an alternate dimension, where they will gradually dissolve into nothingness. He plans to kill Seto and Yugi to save his home dimension and seeks revenge on Bakura, whom he blames for Shadi's death.
In the present day, he alters the memories of everyone in Domino City to make them believe that he is a new student at Domino High School named Aigami (藍神, Aigami). After he is corrupted by the Millennium Ring's power, he is defeated by Dark Yugi and returns to normal before fading away.

== Recurring characters ==
Sugoroku Mutou / Solomon Muto (武藤 双六, Mutō Sugoroku)
Voiced by: Takeshi Aono (1998), Tadashi Miyazawa (2000–present) (Japanese); Maddie Blaustein (Duel Monsters), Marc Diraison (4Kids, ep. 199), Wayne Grayson (Movies) (English)
Yugi's grandfather, who gave him the Millennium Puzzle, which he had recovered from Atem's tomb when he was younger, as a present. He was once a gaming master who traveled around the world before opening the game shop Kame Game. In the Duel Monsters anime, he teaches Jonouchi how to play the Duel Monsters card game. His name comes from the Japanese game Sugoroku. He is the reincarnation of Ancient Egyptian vizier Siamun Muran, who was Atem's right-hand man.
Ryuji Otogi / Duke Devlin (御伽 龍児, Otogi Ryūji)
Voiced by: Ryō Naitō (Japanese); Marc Thompson (English)
A game inventor and the creator of Dungeon Dice Monsters (ダンジョンダイスモンスターズ, Danjon Daisu Monsutāzu) (anime and English manga) or Dragons, Dice, & Dungeons (D·D·D(ドラゴン・ダイス・&(アンド)ダンジョンズ), Doragon Daisu ando Danjonzu) (Japanese manga). Though serious and arrogant, he is level-headed and intelligent. His father, Mr. Otogi, raised him to become a brilliant games player and fulfill his desire to take revenge on Sugoroku. Ryuji was eventually transferred to Domino High School, and his father used this as an opportunity for Ryuji to defeat Yugi in a series of games and fulfill the family's revenge, taking the Millennium Puzzle for himself. However, Ryuji is moved by the games he plays with Yugi and cannot bring himself to hate him, ultimately joining his friend group. He later befriends Pegasus, who became fond of Dungeon Dice Monsters and decides to help him market it. After Yugi defeats Pegasus, he loses interest in their earlier deal, which Ryuji blames Yugi for after believing that he cheated in his match against Pegasus. However, after learning the truth, he befriends Yugi and his group and Pegasus' company resumes the deal.
Shadi (シャーディー, Shādī)
Voiced by: Kaneto Shiozawa (1998), Nozomu Sasaki (2000–2004) (Japanese); Wayne Grayson (English)
The first Millennium Item wielder that Yugi and the group face in the series. He holds the Millennium Key / Millennium Ankh (千年錠, Sennen Jō), which allow him to see humans' inner souls and rearrange their personalities, and the Millennium Scales (千年秤, Sennen Bakari), which can weigh the evil in a person's heart. In the final story arc, he is revealed to be a spirit from the afterlife who is bound to the Millennium Stone and constantly reincarnating to guard it until the Pharaoh returns, as the physical body of his current incarnation was destroyed by Dark Bakura.
Ishizu Ishtar (イシズ・イシュタール, Ishizu Ishutāru)
Voiced by: Sumi Shimamoto (adult), Sakura Nogawa (child) (Japanese); Karen Neill (English)
Marik's elder sister who became a museum curator to lure Yugi and Seto to her and prevent Marik from fulfilling his goals. She holds the Millennium Necklace / Millennium Tauk (千年首飾り, Sennen Tauku), which can foresee events in the near future. Despite her brother's betrayal of their family, she loves him and believes that there is still good in his heart. As a result, she continues to seek a way to return him to the person he once was. She is committed to her family's destiny to serve the pharaoh, as she believes he is the only one with the power to stop Marik.
Rishid Ishtar / Odion Ishtar (リシド・イシュタール, Rishido Ishutāru)
Voiced by: KONTA (Japanese); Michael Alston Baley (English)
Marik's adoptive brother and the second-in-command of the Ghouls. As a child, he was abandoned and taken in by Marik's mother. His father, however, never accepted him as a worthy heir and treated him more like a servant than a son. Despite this, Rishid desired to become a true part of the family and an heir to the tombkeeper clan. When Marik was born, his mother entrusted him with caring for him and he supported him even when he turned to evil. However, Rishid resented him for being the true heir to the tombkeeper's clan and legitimate son of his parents. When Marik was bitten by a cobra and became ill, their father beat Rishid out of fury that he allowed Marik to be harmed and ordered that he stay by Marik's bedside until he recovered. Rishid intended to kill Marik with a dagger in his sleep, but could not bring himself to kill him. When Marik admitted that he was terrified of being forced to take the initiation ritual, he unsuccessfully tried to stop their father from forcing it on him. When this failed, he scarred his own face with a dagger to share the pain and prove his loyalty to their family. When Marik developed his dark split personality, Rishid restrained Dark Marik and protected Marik from knowing about the existence of his dark side. After he helped Marik and Ishizu sneak outside, his father attempted to kill him for betraying them. When Marik returned and witnessed this, his anger allowed Dark Marik to take over and murder his father. Rishid was able to calm Marik down and make his dark side disappear again, lying to him that Shadi killed him under orders from the Pharaoh to protect him from the truth. However, Marik took this as fact, which caused his desire for revenge against the Pharaoh.
Mai Kujaku / Mai Valentine (孔雀 舞, Kujaku Mai)
Voiced by: Haruhi Terada (Japanese); Megan Hollingshead (4Kids, eps. 2–144), Bella Hudson (4Kids, eps. 145–184), Kathleen Delaney (4Kids, uncut) (English)
A former blackjack dealer who worked on a cruise ship, but developed a cynical attitude towards people and manipulated men using her "Aroma Tactics" to beat them in card games. Though this made her money, it caused her to hate people and she quit her job. She became a powerful and successful duelist thanks to her Harpie-themed deck as well as Amazoness cards, but had no true friends and dueled for pride and monetary gain. After entering the Duelist Kingdom tournament to win the prize money and find the things she once cherished, she meets Yugi and his friends and befriends them after they rescue her Star Chips from the Player Killer of Darkness to help her stay in the tournament. Mai faces Yugi in the semi-finals, but chooses to surrender to him after deciding that she cannot win, telling him that some losses only serve to make people stronger. In the Duel Monsters anime, she is depicted as having been raised in a wealthy household, but mostly acknowledged by her relatives.
Shizuka Kawai / Serenity Wheeler (川井 静香, Kawai Shizuka) / Shizuka Jōnouchi (城之内 静香, Jōnouchi Shizuka)
Voiced by: Michiko Neya (1998), Mika Sakenobe (2000–2004) (Japanese); Lisa Ortiz (English)
Jonouchi's younger sister, who was separated from him when their parents divorced and her mother took custody of her. When Shizuka was diagnosed with blindness, Jonouchi entered the Duelist Kingdom tournament to win the prize money needed for the operation that would save her eyesight.
Rebecca Hawkins / Rebecca Hopkins (レベッカ・ホプキンス, Rebekka Hopukinsu)
Voiced by: Kaori Tagami (Japanese); Kerry Williams (English)
A character who only appears in the Duel Monsters anime. She is the bratty twelve-year-old, or eight years old in the English dub, granddaughter of Sugoroku's friend who believes that Sugoroku stole the Blue-Eyes White Dragon card from him. After dueling Yugi to reclaim it, Rebecca and Yugi play a game identical to the one Sugoroku had played with Rebecca's grandfather years ago. After Yugi surrenders, Sugoroku explains that Kaiba tore her Blue-Eyes White Dragon card in half after beating him in a duel. After learning the truth, Rebecca apologizes to Sugoroku and Yugi gives her the "Ties of Friendship" card that he won at Duelist Kingdom to show his acceptance of her forgiveness. Rebecca later appears as one of the contestants in the KC Grand Prix. By this time, she has given up the teddy bear she carried with her in addition to growing out her hair and wearing glasses, and has enrolled in college, but is still immature and self-centered. She has a crush on Yugi, which angers Anzu, although they remain friends.

== Millennium World ==
During the Millennium World story arc, Dark Yugi journeys into his lost memories and meets old acquaintances from Ancient Egypt as NPCs within Dark Bakura's tabletop role-playing game, the Shadow RPG (闇のR・P・G, Yami no Ā Pī Jī), a campaign based on the past.

The Six High Priests (六神官, Roku Shinkan) protect the seven Millennium Items with their lives and swear eternal loyalty to the Pharaoh, Atem, who serves as the player character of Dark Yugi, Atem's spirit in modern times. They served Atem during his reign in Ancient Egypt 3,000 years ago, or 5,000 years ago in the English anime. In the age where Shadow Games were used to determine a person's fate, the Priests used the Millennium Items and sorcery to pull out and seal the souls (Ka) of criminals, which take the form of Monsters Spirits, into stone slabs to do battle. Within the RPG, characters' health and magic were represented by their Ba Gauge.

Priest Seto (神官セト, Shinkan Seto)
Voiced by: Kenjirō Tsuda (adult), Kiyomi Yazawa (child) (Japanese); Eric Stuart (English)
A High Priest and the holder of the Millennium Rod, who was Atem's cousin and Seto's past life. Despite having a similar attitude to him, Seto was a loyal friend of Atem. Before the Battle City arc, a tablet depicting Seto fighting Atem was on display at the Domino City Museum, with his Blue-Eyes White Dragon fighting against Atem's Dark Magician. During the Battle City arc, Kaiba experiences visions of his past life as Seto. Priest Seto appears as an NPC in the Shadow RPG, aligned to Dark Yugi's side of the board.
Priest Mahado / Mahad (神官マハード, Shinkan Mahādo)
Voiced by: Kazunari Kojima (adult), Kenji Iwama (child) (Japanese); Michael Sinterniklaas (English)
A High Priest who was the previous owner of the Millennium Ring before losing it to Thief King Bakura in a Shadow Game. He sensed an evil intelligence within the Millennium Ring, which it absorbed from the previous priest who wore it. His Monster Spirit Ka is Illusion Magician / Magus of Illusion (幻想の魔術師, Gensō no Majutsushi), which he later merges with to become Atem's ace monster, Dark Magician. He also appears in the Shadow RPG.
Priestess Isis (神官アイシス, Shinkan Aishisu)
Voiced by: Sumi Shimamoto (Japanese); Karen Neill (English)
A High Priestess who wields the Millennium Necklace. In the anime, she is Ishizu Ishtar's past life. She is named after the Egyptian goddess Isis.
Priest Karim (神官カリム, Shinkan Karimu)
Voiced by: Masahito Kawanago (Japanese); Sean Schemmel (English)
A High Priest who was the owner of the Millennium Scales. He appears in the Shadow RPG as an NPC aligned with Dark Yugi.
Priest Shada (神官シャダ, Shinkan Shada)
Voiced by: Nozomu Sasaki (Japanese); Michael Alston Baley (English)
A High Priest who was the keeper of the Millennium Key during Atem's reign and reluctantly aided Seto in his criminal hunt for Monster Spirit Ka with his Millennium Key. He died after shielding Atem from a lightning bolt Zorc Necrophades cast, and his Ba Gauge was wiped out. After his death, Siamun reclaimed the Millennium Key to call forth Exodia the Forbidden One.
Siamun Muran / Shimon (シモン・ムーラン, Shimon Mūran)
Voiced by: Tadashi Miyazawa (Japanese); Maddie Blaustein (English)
A vizier of Atem and Sugoroku's past life. He was Shada's predecessor and one of Pharaoh Akhenamkhanen's original guardians, as well as the former keeper of the Millennium Key.
Mana (マナ, Mana)
Voiced by: Yuki Nakao (Japanese); Bella Hudson (English)
A childhood friend of Atem, who studied magic under Mahad as his apprentice and was close to him and Atem. She appears in the Millennium World arc as an NPC during Dark Bakura's Shadow RPG game, and her Ka is the Dark Magician Girl. In the Duel Monsters anime, she can see Atem's friends from the present and initially mistakes Yugi for Atem.
Kisara (キサラ, Kisara)
Voiced by: Rie Nakagawa (Japanese); Carrie Keranen (English)
The keeper of the Blue Eyes White Dragon Monster Spirit in the Millennium World arc. Her pale appearance is unusual, and she is mentioned as being from a "foreign country" in the Japanese anime. In the Duel Monsters anime, it is stated that as children, Priest Seto saved Kisara from slave traders, and she repaid him by unconsciously releasing her inner dragon spirit after the traders set fire to his village and killed his mother. Years later, which is depicted as their first meeting in the manga, Seto encountered Kisara being stoned because of her appearance. Shada sensed the power within her — which he deemed "equal to that of the [Egyptian] Gods" — and Seto took her back to the palace, where he recognized her as the girl he had saved years ago. Kazuki Takahashi stated that he originally planned for the story to have explored the romantic relationship between Seto and Kisara, but these plans were scrapped to meet a deadline. He also stated that Priest Seto's romantic feelings for Kisara are the basis for Kaiba's modern-day obsession with the Blue-Eyes White Dragon card.
Bobasa (ボバサ, Bobasa)
Voiced by: Yū Mizushima (Japanese); Sean Schemmel (English)
In the manga, he is Hasan, a member of an Egyptian tombkeeper clan that protects the Millennium Items under Shadi's command and possesses Shadi's Millennium Scale and his Millennium Key, and an alternate identity of Shadi. He accompanies Yugi and his friends into the Millennium Puzzle's maze, a continuation of the Labyrinth Treasure Hunt from the manga, to find the true door to the king's memory. In the Memory World, he is a NPC in the Shadow RPG, and in the Duel Monsters anime appears as a key switch that can lead the player to where the Pharaoh's name is if they give him food to eat. When he takes them to the Pharaoh's tomb, he vanishes.

== Other characters ==
Ushio (牛尾; known as Demitrius the Bully in the English DDM video game)
Voiced by: Ryuzaburo Otomo (1998), Yūji Kishi (2000) (Japanese); Dan Green (English)
A hall monitor at Domino High School who offers a paid bully protection service to Yugi after Jonouchi and Honda bully him. Although Yugi refuses, denying that he has been bullied, Ushio beats up Jonouchi and Honda and demands that Yugi pay him a fee of 20,000 yen. Ushio ends up being the first victim of Dark Yugi's Shadow Games, suffering a Penalty Game upon defeat that causes him to become insane and think that garbage and leaves are money. He also appears in Yu-Gi-Oh! 5D's.
ZTV Director (ZTVディレクター, Zetto Tī Vi direkutā)
A minor villain who appears in the manga. After he uses Yugi for a bullying scene and beats up Jonouchi, Dark Yugi challenges him to a Shadow Game, with the Penalty Game causing everything he sees to be censored.
Tomoya Hanasaki (花咲 友也, Hanasaki Tomoya; known as Lint Greendale in the English DDM video game)
A friend of Yugi who appears in the manga and befriends Yugi after Dark Yugi defeats Sozoji, who was bullying him, in a Shadow Game. Tomoya is obsessed with the American superhero, Zombire (ゾンバイア, Zonbaia), as his father visited him when he was in the hospital and gave him a Zombire figure, telling him that he is the strongest hero in America and promising to bring him Zombire toys and figures when he returned from America.
Sozoji (騒象寺, Sōzōji; known as Fender Shrill in the English DDM video game)
A minor villain who appears in the manga. He is a karaoke player who tries to get people to listen to his horrid singing and forces Yugi and Hanasaki to sell tickets to his All Night Solo Live Show. Yugi discovers that Hanasaki was asked to sell tickets and offers to take charge of sales, but Sozoji discovers the exchange and beats up Hanasaki. Yugi arrives at the show, not having sold any tickets, where Sozoji forces Yugi to listen to his music at a deafening volume and brings out Hanasaki as the audience for the next act. Dark Yugi challenges him to a Shadow Game, with his Penalty Game being having to hear his heartbeat at deafening volumes.
Prisoner Number 777 (囚人ナンバー777, Shūjin nanbā 777)
Voiced by: Mahito Ōba
A convict who escaped from Domino City Jail with a stolen handgun after killing a guard and framed Sasaki for it. In the manga, Dark Yugi challenges him to a Shadow Game, with his Penalty Game having him be set on fire. In the Toei anime, he is called Jiro the Spider (女郎蜘蛛のジロウ, Jorōgumo no Jirō) and is the manager of the Burger World restaurant, with the Penalty Game being him in an illusion where he is set on fire and is arrested.
Tetsuo Sasaki (ササキテツオ, Sasaki Tetsuo)
Voiced by: Nobuyuki Hiyama
A character who appears in the Toei anime. He is a thief who Jiro the Spider framed for killing a guard with a stolen handgun.
Kokurano (孤蔵野, Kokurano)
Voiced by: Shigeru Chiba
A character who appears in the manga and the Toei anime. He is a self-proclaimed psychic in Class 1-A of Domino High School who predicted a fellow student's house would catch fire. This came true three weeks later and caused him to become famous at school, but in reality, he set the student's house on fire. In the Toei anime, Kokurano dislikes Miho because she will not get a prediction from him. After he tries to make Yugi a victim of his "predictions" and knocks Anzu out with chloroform, Dark Yugi challenges him to a Shadow Game, and the next day his false predictions are revealed.
Goro Inogashira (猪頭 吾郎, Inogashira Gorō)
A minor villain who appears in the manga. He was the senior president of class D's festival committee at Domino City High, who trashes Yugi's festival stand and is challenged to play "Ice Griddle Hockey". After being defeated, he engulfed in an explosion as punishment.
Ms. Chono (蝶野先生, Chōno-sensei; known as Lynn Madusa in the English DDM video game)
Voiced by: Masako Katsuki
A teacher who appears in the manga and the Toei anime. She is known as the "Expelling Witch" (退学魔女, Taigaku Majo), since she expelled fifteen students over six months. Her beautiful appearance is due to the excessive make-up she wears, which covers her true ugly face. She also enjoys dating, but revels in dumping men to see them cry. After she nearly expels Honda, Dark Yugi makes her face a Penalty Game and her true face is revealed to her class as her make-up falls off like puzzle pieces.
Junky Scorpion Owner (ジャンキースコーピオンのオーナー, Jankī Sukōpion no Ōnā)
A minor villain who appears in the manga. He tries to con Jonouchi out of a pair of Air Muscle shoes he bought, but Yugi learns of this and Dark Yugi confronts the owner. The owner hides his scorpion in one of the shoes as he gave it back to Dark Yugi in hopes of poisoning him. Instead, he is challenged to a Shadow Game and is ultimately stung by his own scorpion.
Hirutani (蛭谷, Hirutani)
Voiced by: Shin Aomori
The leader of a gang of teenage thugs from Rintama High School and an old associate of Jonouchi when they were in a gang during middle school. After middle school, Hirutani went to Rintama High School, while Jonouchi went to Domino High School. He blackmails Jonouchi in an attempt to convince him to join him, but is defeated by Dark Yugi.
Kanekura (金倉, Kanekura)
The curator of Domino City Museum, who exhibits the Millennium Puzzle after Yugi agrees to let him exhibit it for one day.
Professor Yoshimori (吉森博士, Yoshimori-hakase)
Voiced by: Akio Nojima
A Domino University professor who is into archaeology and a friend of Sugoroku. He has a wife and son, but neglects them in favor of his work. In the Toei series, he does not take part in Shadi's Shadow Game and is instead hospitalized after being thrown out of the museum window.
Kujirada (鯨田, Kujirada; known as Beluga in the English DDM video game)
Voiced by: Shōzō Iizuka
A classmate of Yugi's at Domino High School in the manga and the Toei anime. He causes trouble with his aggressive Digital Pet (デジタル・ペット, Dejitaru petto) but is being bullied and manipulated by Haiyama. After losing to Honda's Digital Pet, Haiyama punishes Kujirada by whipping him, but Dark Yugi saves Honda, Miho, and Kujirada by challenging Haiyama to a Digital Pet Shadow Game.
Haiyama (灰山)
Voiced by: Daisuke Sakaguchi
Kujirada's bully in the Toei anime.
Dragon 1 / Street Fighter (ストリートファイター, Sutorīto Faitā)
Voiced by: Nobuyuki Hiyamda
A boy who beats up Yugi over a losing streak of Virtual VS, with them using the character of Bruce Ryu, who is based on Bruce Lee. He then steals the Millennium Puzzle from Yugi and Jonouchi pursues Street Fighter to reclaim it. They fight in Street Fighter's game, "One-Inch Terror", and he is defeated.
Johji (ジョージ, Jōji)
Honda's nephew and the son of his big sister, who appears in the manga. He calls Honda by his given name, Hiroto, and dislikes him and his friends. He is a fan of Kaiba and forces Honda to take him to the opening of Kaiba Land, where Honda witnesses Kaiba dealing Sugoroku an artificial Penalty Game and decides to accompany Yugi and the group in Kaiba's Death-T challenge.
Tsuruoka (鶴岡)
The guidance counselor of Domino High School, who appears in the manga. He abuses his position to be unfair to the students and mocks the low achievement test grades of Yugi, Jonouchi, and Honda to their peers as punishment for playing the Achievement Test Bingo Game. He then takes the Lovely Two (ラブリー二号, Raburī Ni-gō) keychain that Anzu had given to Yugi as a gift, citing that students are not allowed to bring games to school.
ZTV Producer (ZTVプロデューサー, Zetto Tī Vi Purodyūsā)
A selfish and corrupt executive of the television studio ZTV, who takes advantage of underprivileged people to boost ratings and cheats his way out of giving away prize money. He was a producer of the TV game show 100 Million Yen!! Game Get Show (100万円！！ゲームDEゲット・ショー, Hyaku Man-en! Gēmu DE Getto shō; Get a Million Yen Show). After learning that Jonouchi, who was poor and trying to pay off his father's gambling debts, would be on the show, he attempts to rig the final stage of the game to prevent Jonouchi from winning the ¥1,000,000 prize money. Dark Yugi's attempt to punish him ends up backfiring, but Jonouchi does not get the prize money.
Koji Nagumo (名蜘蛛 コージ, Nagumo Kōji)
Voiced by: Shin Tomita (Japanese); Matthew Charles (English)
A minor villain who first appears in the original manga. In the manga, Nagumo asks Yugi to play Monster Fighter (モンスター・ファイター, Monsutā Faitā) with him while at Domino High School. While playing, Nagumo hits Yugi and takes his gun and monster, Alti, then tries to sell it and other Monster Fighter figures and guns he has collected for ¥30,000 each. Dark Yugi comes into his store and fights Nagumo and his Wild Spider in a Shadow Game with Katsuya's monster, Killer Emaada, which Yugi had asked to borrow. Nagumo's face is cracked in the first set, which goes to Dark Yugi, as the Shadow Game dictated that the players are damaged in the game rather than the monsters. In the second set, Nagumo cheats by kicking Dark Yugi in the side. Enraged, Dark Yugi raises the Shadow Game's mode to "level three". When Nagumo tries to cheat again, his legs are held down by the monsters, including his own, and he sees that the monster on his field is his own soul, which is the Wild Spider's body with his face. Dark Yugi then deals the death blow, piercing the representation of Nagumo's soul and purging it of darkness. He also competes in the Battle City tournament, but is defeated by Kaiba's God Card.
Playing Card Bomber (English manga) / Continuous Bomber (連続爆弾魔, Renzoku Bakudanma) (1998 anime) / Trump Bomber (トランプ爆弾魔, Toranpu Bakudan Ma) (Japanese manga)
Voiced by: Ryūsei Nakao
A man who sets off a string of bombs in Domino, with his third attack at the Domino Mall killing eight people and his fourth bomb threat endangering Anzu's life. In the manga, Dark Yugi saves her life by playing Clock Solitaire (時計（クロック）カード・ゲーム, Kurokku Kādo Gēmu) without getting four threes. Afterwards, Dark Yugi reveals the bomber's whereabouts to the chief of police, leading to his arrest. In the anime, Dark Yugi makes him face a Penalty Game where he thinks that there is a bomb in the car he was hiding in.
Hajime Imori (井守 はじめ, Imori Hajime)
Voiced by: Megumi Urawa
A student at Domino High School who is withdrawn and shy, but is revealed to be anti-social and vindicated, eventually uncovering the secrets of the Millennium Puzzle. He decides to usurp Yugi from his position of the "guardian of darkness" by challenging him to a game of Dragon Cards (龍札（ドラゴン・カード）, Doragon Kādo), a forbidden Chinese Shadow Game which his grandfather found while in Manchuria in World War II. He is defeated and his soul is sucked out as food for the game, while in the Toei anime, only his darkness is sucked out. Imori is not present in the Duel Monsters anime. However in the spin-off/sequel Yu-Gi-Oh! GX, his name is listed as one of Trueman's victims that were taken to the World of Darkness until they were freed by Jaden Yuki.
Nezumi (根津見)
A character who appears in the manga. He uses a sob story about getting hit by yo-yos in a robbery to lure Yugi and Jonouchi to Hirutani. After Jonouchi asks Nezumi to lead him to the gangsters, he and Yugi travel to Hirutani's abandoned warehouse, where several gang members ambush them. Though they defeat them, Nezumi flees.
Mr. Karita (刈田先生, Karita-sensei)
Voiced by: Masato Hirano
A gym teacher who harasses Bakura on his first day at Domino High School. After seeing him walking through the hallways with a group of girls, he recognizes him as a student who caused problems at his previous school. Insistent on disciplining him, Mr. Karita tells him that the school's rules state that boys with long hair is against the rules, and orders him that he must shave his hair if he wants to be treated as a student. Dark Bakura later defeats him and puts his soul in a game piece.
Insector Haga / Weevil Underwood (インセクター羽蛾, Insekutā Haga)
Voiced by: Urara Takano (Japanese); Jimmy Zoppi (English)
The former Japanese champion of Duel Monsters, who is known for his deck of insect-type monsters and insect-related magic and trap cards. He is not above cheating to ensure his strategies work, as he befriends Yugi only to throw his Exodia cards into the ocean and puts a Paracitic Insect card in Jonouchi's deck to ensure that his Insect Barrier would work. He and Ryuzaki later attempt to get the Egyptian God Cards.
Dinosaur Ryuzaki / Rex Raptor (ダイナソウ竜崎, Dainasō Ryūzaki)
Voiced by: Kin Fujii (2000–2001), Yuichi Nakamura (2002–2004) (Japanese); Brian Zimmerman/ Sam Regal (4Kids, eps. 1–144), Sebastian Arcelus (4Kids, eps. 145–187), Anthony Salerno (4Kids, eps. 188–224) (English)
The runner-up of the Japanese Duel Monsters tournament, whose nickname is derived from his fondness for dinosaur-themed cards. He is defeated by Jonouchi in the Duelist Kingdom tournament and has his Red-Eyes Black Dragon, a card that would become a trademark for Jonouchi, taken as a result of a gamble. He reappears during the Battle City arc, where he is defeated by Espa Roba and warns Jonouchi not to duel him. He and Ryuzaki later attempt to get the Egyptian God Cards.
Ryota Kajiki / Mako Tsunami (梶木 漁太, Kajiki Ryōta)
Voiced by: Daisuke Namikawa (Japanese); Andrew Rannells (English)
An ocean-themed duelist who appears in the Duelist Kingdom and Battle City arcs. He is introduced in the Duelist Kingdom arc, where he duels Dark Yugi and is defeated. In the Battle City arc, he duels Jonouchi and it is revealed that his father was a fisherman who died out at sea. In the manga and the Duel Monsters anime, he instead duels to honor his father's memory, and in the English dub he duels to raise money to fund a trip to search for his father. After Jonouchi defeats Ryota in their duel, he gives him two of his cards Floating Whale Fortress and The Legendary Fisherman, the latter resembling his deceased father.
Keith Howard (キース・ハワード, Kīsu Hawādo)
Voiced by: Hajime Komada (Japanese); Ted Lewis (English)
Known as Bandit Keith by his enemies, he is an American Duel Monsters champion and a "Card Professor" who seeks big prizes at tournaments. He first appears in the Duelist Kingdom arc. Flashbacks reveal that he was once the champion of Duel Monsters in America until he dueled Pegasus at the American Championship tournament and lost. This was done when Pegasus wrote something on a piece of paper and called a boy named Sam from the audience. When Bandit Keith played the monster "Garnecia Elefantis", Sam followed the information written on the paper and played "Flying Elephant" in attack mode, which took out Bandit Keith's remaining lifepoints. This match led Kaiba to learn of Pegasus' ability to read minds. After he cheats in his duel against Jonouchi in the Duelist Kingdom semi-finals, Pegasus inflicts the "Hand and Gun" Penalty Game on him, turning his hand into a gun and forcing him to play Russian Roulette, effectively killing him. In the anime, Pegasus instead sends him through a trap door into the ocean. He survives and is rescued by Marik, who controls his mind and uses him in an attempt to defeat Yugi and take the Millennium Puzzle, but flees after accidentally starting a fire.
Ghost Kozuka / Bonz (ゴースト骨塚, Gōsuto Kotsuzuka)
Voiced by: Masami Suzuki (Japanese); Amy Birnbaum (English)
A contestant in Duelist Kingdom who worked for Bandit Keith, who gave him cards to enhance his zombie deck and duel Jonouchi in Duelist Kingdom's caverns, which house the corpses of World War II troops. Thanks to Keith's strategy, Kozuka plays "Call of the Haunted", which brings back "Zanki", "Crawling Dragon", and Crass Clown" as zombie monsters "Armored Zombie", "Dragon Zombie", and "Clown Zombie". He also summons "Pumpking the King of Ghosts" to strengthen the zombie monsters with ectoplasm until it is destroyed by "Red-Eyes Black Dragon". Kozuka loses to Jonouchi after he plays a combination of "Battle Warrior" and "Shield and Sword" to switch the ATK points and DEF points of the monsters on the field, leaving the zombie monsters with no ATK points. After sealing Yugi and his friends in a cave, Bandit Keith steals his Star Chips and he is presumably sent off the island. He returns during the Battle City arc, but is defeated and presumably killed by Dark Bakura in a Shadow Game; in the Duel Monsters anime, he is presumably sent to Hell by Dark Bakura. However, he is later rescued following his defeat in Battle City, along with everyone else who was sent there.
Step Johnny / Johnny Steps (ステップ・ジョニー, Suteppu Jonī)
Voiced by: Hideki Konda (Japanese); Matthew Charles (English)
A dancer who challenges Anzu to a game of Super Dancer (スーパ・ダンサー, Sūpa Dansā) during her "date" with Dark Yugi, with her having to go on a date with him if she loses. In the Duel Monsters anime, he insists on going on a date with him after the encounter in the arcade, later facing Dark Yugi in a Duel Monsters duel. After his "Heavy Metal King" is destroyed, he forfeits after learning who Yugi is.
Esper Roba / Espa Roba (エスパー絽場, Esupā Roba)
Voiced by: Maiko Itō (Japanese); Sebastian Arcelus (English)
One of the contestants participating in Battle City, who claims to have ESP. In reality, he uses his younger brothers to spy on and report to him the cards in his opponent's hand, allowing him to 'predict' the opponent's strategies before they use them. He did this to give off the impression of being an unbeatable duelist and deflect the abuse they receive, as they were bullied due to previously working at a carnival. Junouchi faces off against him after he defeats Dinosaur Ryuzaki and claimed his "Serpent Night Dragon", receiving his best card, Jinzo / Artificial Human Psycho Shocker (人造人間－サイコ・ショッカー, Jinzō Ningen Saiko Shokkā), after defeating him.
Ahmet (アメット, Ametto)
One of two men hired to help Sugoroku through the Pharaoh's tomb, the Shrine of the Shadow Games, in the early 1960s. In the tomb were multiple statues armed with swords on a catwalk. To cross, a person needed to walk across left footed, as if they ran on both legs, the statues would kill them; however, the brothers were right footed. Ahmet managed to make it to it safety, while his brother fell to his death, which he blamed Sugoroku for. Though they reached the Millennium Puzzle, only those of courageous hearts could pass; because he had the heart of a coward, a monster appeared and devoured him as a Penalty Game.
Mushara (マッシャーラー, Musshārā)
One of two men hired to help Sugoroku through the Pharaoh's tomb, the Shrine of the Shadow Games, in the early 1960s. While trying to make it through one of the tomb's traps, Mushara fell to his death, which Ahmet blamed Sugoroku for.
Shogo Aoyama (青山 翔吾, Aoyama Shōgo)
Voiced by: Eiko Yamada
A character who appears in the 1999 movie as one of the main protagonists. He is a boy who did not play games with his friends because he was afraid of losing, and was regularly bullied by a group of three boys. After opening a card pack containing the rare "Red-Eyes Black Dragon" card, he uses it to intimidate people so they will not duel him.
Arthur Hawkins / Arthur Hopkins (アーサー・ホプキンス, Āsā Hopukinsu)
Voiced by: Saburo Kodaka (Japanese); Mike Pollock (English)
A character who appears in the Duel Monsters anime. He is Rebecca Hawkins's grandfather.
Leon von Schroeder / Leonhart von Schroeder (レオンハルト・フォン・シュレイダー, Reonharuto fon Shureidā)
Voiced by: Seiko Noguchi (Japanese); Andrew Rannells (English)
A character created for the KC Grand Champion filler arc of Yu-Gi-Oh! Duel Monsters. He is Siegfried von Schroeder's younger brother. While Siegfried ran Schroeder Corporation, Leonhart took up playing Duel Monsters and dueled in several tournaments under the alias Leon Wilson (レオン・ウィルソン, Reon Wiruson) to get away from his family. His monster cards, magic cards, and trap cards are based on different fairy tales and were created for him after he wrote a letter to Pegasus, including "Tom Thumb", "Cinderella", "Little Red Riding Hood", and "Iron Hans". During the KC Grand Prix, Leon defeats the duelists Dr. Richard Goat, Ethan Shark, and Rebecca Hawkins. However, after he duels Yugi when Ziegfried is disqualified upon losing to Kaiba, his identity is discovered by one of Kaiba's workers after Ziegfried has him play an illegal card called "Golden Castle of Stromberg", which releases a computer virus into Kaiba Corporation. As Leon is unable to remove the card with "Mystic Space Typhoon", since it will only be removed if Yugi discards ten cards from the deck due to Ziegfried's hacking, he has no choice but to continue the duel. When Yugi does not have the required number of cards left, the "Golden Castle of Stromberg" is destroyed and he uses a combination of "Necromancy", "Diffusion Wave Motion", and "Dark Magician to defeat Leon while Kaiba disposes of the computer virus.
