= Yu-Gi-Oh! The Dark Side of Dimensions =

2016 film by Satoshi Kuwabara

- American theatrical release poster
- Kanji: 遊☆戯☆王 THE DARK SIDE OF DIMENSIONS（ザ・ダーク・サイド・オブ・ディメンションズ）
- Literal meaning: Yu-Gi-Oh! The Dark Side of Dimensions
- Revised Hepburn: Yū Gi Ō Za Dāku Saido Obu Dimenshonzu
- Directed by: Satoshi Kuwabara
- Screenplay by: Satoshi Kuwabara; Kazuki Takahashi; Masahiro Hikokubo
- Based on: Yu-Gi-Oh! by Kazuki Takahashi & Studio Dice
- Produced by: Teruaki Jitsumatsu
- Starring: see below
- Cinematography: Hiroaki Edamitsu
- Edited by: Akio Nakagawa
- Music by: Yoshihiro Ike
- Production company: Gallop
- Distributed by: Toei Company, Ltd.
- Release date: April 23, 2016
- Running time: 131 minutes
- Country: Japan
- Language: Japanese
- Box office: ¥800 million ($7.5 million)

Yu-Gi-Oh! The Dark Side of Dimensions (Japanese: 遊☆戯☆王 THE DARK SIDE OF DIMENSIONS（ザ・ダーク・サイド・オブ・ディメンションズ）, Hepburn: Yū Gi Ō Za Dāku Saido Obu Dimenshonzu) is a 2016 Japanese animated science fantasy film written and directed by Satoshi Kuwabara, with Kazuki Takahashi and Masahiro Hikokubo as co-writers, based on the Yu-Gi-Oh! franchise by Takahashi. Produced by Studio Gallop and distributed by Toei Company, The Dark Side of Dimensions tells a new story that takes place after the events of the original Yu-Gi-Oh! storyline; specifically, it is set six months after the events of the original Yu-Gi-Oh! manga, and thus features some slight contradictions to the storyline of the anime adaptation. (Note: Despite these contradictions, the English dub is presented as taking place after the end of the anime, rather than the manga, and advances the time-gap from six months to one year.) The film stars Shunsuke Kazama as the voice of Yugi Mutou and Kenjiro Tsuda as Seto Kaiba, alongside Hiroki Takahashi, Takayuki Kondo, Maki Satō, Rica Matsumoto, Junko Takeuchi, Kento Hayashi, Kana Hanazawa and Satoshi Hino. The Dark Side of Dimensions was released in Japan on April 23, 2016, in the United States and Canada on January 27, 2017, and in Australia on February 2, 2017.

== Plot ==
Seto Kaiba commissions an excavation to retrieve the lost and disassembled Millennium Puzzle from the ruins of the Millennium chamber, where a mysterious cloaked man appears at the underground shrine. Six months after the Pharaoh's departure (Note: As depicted in Yu-Gi-Oh! Duel Monsters. The film takes place one year after the events of the anime in the English dub continuity.), Yugi Muto and his friends Joey Wheeler, Téa Gardner, Tristan Taylor, and Ryo Bakura prepare to graduate from Domino High School and contemplate what they will do in the future.

Kaiba locates the Puzzle, which once housed the spirit of the Pharaoh Atem, Kaiba's longtime rival, whom he hopes to revive in order to settle their ancient score. The excavation is interrupted by a young man named Diva, who faces Kaiba in a game of Duel Monsters and steals two pieces of the Puzzle. He keeps one fragment and gives the other to his younger sister Sera, who passes it on to Yugi; as the modern-day counterpart of the Pharaoh, he is the only one who can reassemble the Puzzle.

Diva, under the alias "Aigami," befriends Yugi and his friends while taking an interest in Bakura, whom he believes is responsible for the death of his mentor and father figure, Shadi Shin. Using the Quantum Cube, he transports Bakura and Joey to another dimension, where Bakura apologizes for Shadi's death and explains that the evil spirit of the Millennium Ring was responsible. However, they are interrupted by Diva's friend Mani, who has become warped by the Millennium Ring's evil energy. When Yugi, Téa, and Tristan find "Aigami", he reveals his true identity and his plan to eliminate Yugi and his friends. As Diva nearly disintegrates them into another dimension, Joey returns to the real world with help from Atem.

Kaiba rebuilds the Millennium Puzzle and discovers that the last two pieces are missing. He abducts Diva and approaches Yugi so they can duel to showcase his updated Duel Disk virtual reality technology while wagering their pieces of the puzzle. However, Yugi, furious with Diva for what he did to Bakura, decides to duel him instead, which Kaiba agrees to. Yugi defeats Diva, resulting in Bakura returning to the real world.

While dueling Kaiba, Yugi reassembles the Millennium Puzzle to prove that Atem's spirit is no longer inside. Diva becomes corrupted by the Millennium Ring's evil power and duels Yugi and Kaiba, during which Kaiba sacrifices himself and tells Yugi to summon Atem. Yugi puts on the Puzzle and continues the Duel, but is physically unable to draw his next card and begins to black out. However, he is suddenly engulfed by a beam of golden light and Atem returns. He possesses Yugi's body and defeats Diva, who returns to normal before disappearing. Atem and Yugi bid each other farewell, and Atem and the Millennium Puzzle then fade away.

Yugi and his friends graduate from high school and see Téa off at the airport as she leaves to pursue her lifelong dream of becoming a professional dancer in New York City. Meanwhile, Kaiba uses his technology in conjunction with the Quantum Cube to transport his consciousness to the afterlife and challenge Atem to a duel. Atem smiles as Kaiba approaches.

== Voice cast ==
Character	Japanese voice cast	English dub cast
Yugi Mutou/Atem	Shunsuke Kazama	Dan Green
Seto Kaiba	Kenjiro Tsuda	Eric Stuart
Katsuya Jōnouchi/Joey Wheeler	Hiroki Takahashi	Wayne Grayson
Anzu Mazaki/Téa Gardner	Maki Saitō	Amy Birnbaum
Hiroto Honda/Tristan Taylor	Takayuki Kondo	Greg Abbey
Ryo Bakura/Dark Bakura	Rica Matsumoto	Ted Lewis/Michael Lockwood Crouch (young)
Mokuba Kaiba	Junko Takeuchi	Tara Sands
Ryuji Otogi/Duke Devlin	Ryō Naitō	Marc Thompson
Aigami (Diva)	Kento Hayashi	Daniel J. Edwards
Sugoroku Mutō/Solomon Muto	Tadashi Miyazawa	Wayne Grayson
Ryō Bakura's Father	Kazuhiro Yamaji	Marc Thompson
Sera	Kana Hanazawa	Laurie Hymes
Mani	Satoshi Hino	Tamir Cousins
Scud/Kudaragi	Kendo Kobayashi	Billy Bob Thompson
Shadi Shin	Nozomu Sasaki	Wayne Grayson

== Production ==
The film was announced in the West prior to its announcement in Japan. 4K Media Inc. announced the film on the official Yu-Gi-Oh! website, that the movie was in development in Japan and that they were shopping for a distributor in all non-Asian territories. The film's teaser trailer was first shown in a panel featuring Kazuki Takahashi at the 2015 San Diego Comic-Con. It was later uploaded to the official yugioh.com YouTube channel. Original Yu-Gi-Oh! manga creator Kazuki Takahashi personally drew the keyframes for one of the film's sequences. 4K Media held a contest in August 2016, offering fans the chance to provide voices for the English-language release of the film.

== Release ==
The film was released in theaters in Japan on April 23, 2016, later receiving 4DX and MX4D screenings on September 24, 2016. Before the release on 2017, to promote the upcoming film, Six Flags theme park began to promote a campaign for the film from November 19, 2016 to January 1, 2017, as 4K Media confirmed to promote for the new holiday promotion in partnership Six Flags Entertainment Corporation. The film received limited screenings in North America from January 27, 2017, to February 9, 2017, offering limited edition trading cards for attendees, while Manga Entertainment screened the film for a limited time in the United Kingdom in February 2017. Eleven Arts later listed the English subtitled version screenings in the United States.

=== Transcend Game ===
Yu-Gi-Oh! creator Kazuki Takahashi created a new one-shot manga called TRANSCEND GAME. The two-part prologue story is set between the end of the Yu-Gi-Oh! manga and the beginning of The Dark Side of Dimensions. In Japan, Part 1 was released in the 19th issue of Weekly Shōnen Jump on April 11, 2016, and Part 2 was released in the 20th issue on April 18, 2016.

In the United States, Part 1 was released in the December 19, 2016 issue of VIZ Media's digital Weekly Shōnen Jump magazine. Part 2 was released in the January 2, 2017 issue.

== Reception ==
=== Box office ===
The Dark Side of Dimensions opened on 137 theaters and debuted at number 6 in the Japanese box office charts, earning 133,010,600 yen (about $1,200,000) in its first weekend. The film earned over 800,000,000 yen (about $7,500,000) after its screenings ended. During its 4DX and MX4D screenings, the film has earned 1,000,000,000 yen (about US $9,000,000). In the United Kingdom the film grossed a total of $141,065 and in Australia $157,175. In New Zealand, the film earned $16,680 on its opening weekend. In the United States, the film earned a total of $1,015,339.

=== Home media ===
In its first week of release in Japan, the film's Blu-ray sold 17,720 units, and the DVD sold 4,208 units for a total of 21,728 units. In its last charted week (2nd week), the Blu-ray sold an additional 980 units for a total of 18,500 units. In its last charted week (5th week), the DVD sold 205 units for a total of 6,093 units. In the United Kingdom, it was 2017's seventh best-selling foreign language film on home video, and the year's third best-selling Japanese film (behind the anime films Your Name and My Neighbor Totoro).

=== Critical response ===
The Dark Side of Dimensions received a mixed critical reception. On review aggregator Rotten Tomatoes, the film has an approval rating of 40%, with an average rating of 5.1/10 from five critic reviews. Richard Eisenbeis from Kotaku reviewed the movie favorably, praising the character conflict and narrative. However, S. Jhoanna Robledo from Common Sense Media notes that the complicated storyline is best appreciated by fans of the show.

== Home media ==
The film was released on DVD and Blu-ray on March 8, 2017, in Japan. The Yu-Gi-Oh! Transcend Game manga was bundled with the release. Manga Entertainment released the film on Blu-ray Disc and DVD on May 29, 2017, in the United Kingdom. Lionsgate released the film on Blu-ray Disc, DVD, and Digital HD on June 27, 2017, in the United States and Canada. Anchor Bay Entertainment also released the film on June 13, 2017.
