= Yu-Gi-Oh! Forbidden Memories =

1999 video game

- Developer: Konami Computer Entertainment Japan
- Publisher: Konami
- Director: Morikuni Kubo
- Producer: Satoshi Shimomura
- Artist: Masafumi Kamio
- Writer: Masaaki Karube
- Composers: Naoko Ishii; Hiroshi Tanabe; Waichiro Ozaki
- Series: Yu-Gi-Oh!
- Platform: PlayStation
- Release: JP: December 9, 1999; NA: March 19, 2002; EU: March 7, 2003
- Genre: Digital collectible card game
- Modes: Single-player, multiplayer

Yu-Gi-Oh! Forbidden Memories (Note: Known in Japan as Yu-Gi-Oh True Duel Monsters: Sealed Memories (Japanese: 遊☆戯☆王真デュエルモンスターズ封印されし記憶, Hepburn: Yū Gi Ō Shin Dueru Monsutāzu: Fūin sa reshi Kioku)) is a 1999 digital collectible card game developed and published by Konami for the PlayStation. It is based on the Kazuki Takahashi manga Yu-Gi-Oh! and operates on a modified version of the Yu-Gi-Oh! Trading Card Game. The single-player campaign follows an ancient Egyptian prince, an ancestor of series protagonist Yugi Mutou, who must recover the Millennium Items and thwart the scheme of the evil high priest Heishin. The game was originally released in Japan in 1999, followed by releases in North America in 2002 and in Europe in 2003. It received mixed reviews upon its Western release; while critics acknowledged its appeal to fans of the franchise, they faulted its high difficulty, steep learning curve, and lack of tutorials. The game was commercially successful, selling two million units in the United States and Europe by 2004.

== Gameplay ==
An example of a duel in Yu-Gi-Oh! Forbidden Memories

Yu-Gi-Oh! Forbidden Memories is a digital collectible card game based on the Yu-Gi-Oh! Trading Card Game, with the rules modified and streamlined for increased flexibility. Each player's deck consists of 40 cards, drawing from a total of 722 monster, magic, and trap cards. The players field cards on a board divided into two ranks of five slots: the front rank holds monsters, while the rear rank holds magic and trap cards. A duel ends when one player's life points reach zero, when a player can no longer draw from their deck, or if a player has a hand containing all five cards from the Exodia series.

Monsters are classified into 20 categories (such as warrior, fairy, aqua, spellcaster, etc.). Each carries values of attack and defense points and belongs to one of several terrain groups (such as forest, mountain, dark, etc.). When a monster occupies an advantageous terrain, it receives a boost in its attack and defense points. In addition, every monster played is assigned a cosmic alignment (Sun, Moon, Jupiter, Neptune, etc.) which remains fixed for that card; a monster with a superior alignment attacking an inferior monster gains 500 attack points, while an inferior monster attacking a superior monster adds 500 defense points to the superior monster.

Players begin each turn by drawing into a hand of five and playing one or more cards. The results of monster attacks are based on the comparison of the attacking monster's attack points against the opposing monster's attack or defense points, depending on the target's orientation. If no defending monster is present, damage is applied directly to the opponent's life points. Magic cards may be played to boost monster attributes, eliminate opposing defenses, recover life points, or produce other effects; trap cards activate in response to specific opponent actions such as an incoming attack. Ritual cards can be used to summon a powerful monster at the expense of a few others. Two or more compatible cards can be fused together to produce a new monster or magic card.

The single-player campaign puts the player in the role of the prince of the Amenhotep Dynasty, who must duel a variety of rivals as he collects the Millennium Items; losing a duel results in a game over. The Free Duel mode allows the player to duel opponents previously defeated in the single-player campaign. In two-player duels, the players load their decks from separate memory cards, and cards can be traded between memory cards. Victories award the player Star Chips, which can be spent to purchase additional cards. Eight-digit passwords from official Yu-Gi-Oh! cards can also be entered to request specific cards for purchase.

== Plot ==
In ancient Egypt, the high priest Heishin discovers a forbidden treasure of ancient sorcerers, which grants a dark power. Meanwhile, the young prince of the Amenhotep Dynasty frequently sneaks out of the palace to duel commoners in card games, frustrating his advisor Simon Muran. At a town festival, the prince and his friends Teana and Jono encounter the arrogant priest Seto, who easily defeats Jono before the prince bests Seto in a duel. That night, Heishin and his forces, including Seto, invade the palace using dark sorcery, capturing the Pharaoh and queen. Seto confronts the fleeing prince, demanding the location of a "Millennium Item" to spare the royals. The battered Simon arrives, handing the Millennium Puzzle to the prince and urging him to protect it, as it is the key to unlocking an immense power. Cornered by Heishin, the prince challenges him to a duel but loses. As Heishin moves to seize the Puzzle, Simon holds him off, and the prince shatters it. The prince's and Simon's souls are sealed inside the Puzzle's labyrinthine realm. Simon explains this was the only way to keep the Puzzle from Heishin; the prince will sleep until someone reassembles it in the future, allowing his return.

In modern-day Domino City, Japan, Yugi Mutou awakens from a dream of these events during the Kaiba Corporation's World Championship Tournament. As he advances through the tournament, Shadi appears, drawn by the Millennium Items. Using his Millennium Key, Shadi helps Yugi enter his own mind, where he meets the prince. The prince silently conveys his desire to return home and gives Yugi six blank cards. Back in the real world, Yugi realizes these cards are meant to free the prince. Yugi progresses through and wins the tournament finals, absorbing his opponents' Millennium Items into the blank cards. With all the Items gathered, the prince is restored to ancient Egypt. Simon, fading away, instructs him to reclaim the Items Heishin has placed in shrines across conquered lands, then seal them permanently to prevent the darkness Heishin has unleashed from spreading.

The prince finds Egypt under the rule of Heishin and his high priests. He reunites with the tomb guardian Sadin in the Valley of the Kings and with Jono and Teana at a secret new dueling ground, the old one having been destroyed. Searching the ruined palace, he discovers a map to the Forbidden Ruins. There, with Sadin, he views ancient drawings revealing the Items' locations. Seto, having followed them, urges the prince to defeat the high priests guarding the Items, claiming this will weaken Heishin's power. The prince travels to the shrines, defeating the high priests in duels and claiming the Millennium Items. When Seto's forces kidnap Teana as bait, the prince and Jono come to rescue her at the threshold of Heishin's shrine. Seto releases her and leads the prince to Heishin, claiming he wants him defeated.

After the prince bests Heishin and claims the final Millennium Item, the prince regroups with Seto at the Forbidden Ruins. Seto betrays the prince, admitting he used him as a pawn to gather the Items so he, as a descendant of the ancient dark sorcerers, could claim them and summon DarkNite to achieve ultimate power. The prince defeats Seto in a duel and prepares to destroy the Items, but Heishin reappears, having staged his loss to expose Seto's treachery. He seizes the Items, summons DarkNite, and vainly demands obedience under the pact made by Seto's ancestors. DarkNite rejects him, transforms Heishin into a card, and incinerates it, then turns on the prince and Seto, intent on conquering the world. Presenting the cards he used to return to Egypt, the prince challenges DarkNite and defeats him. DarkNite transforms into the monstrous NiteMare, whom the prince also defeats, finally banishing him from the mortal realm. Seto vanishes forever, and Egypt is reunified under the prince, who buries the Forbidden Ruins, becomes a great pharaoh, and brings prosperity.

== Development and release ==
Yu-Gi-Oh! Forbidden Memories was developed and published by Konami, and is based on the Kazuki Takahashi manga Yu-Gi-Oh! Development was directed by Morikuni Kubo, with Satoshi Shimomura acting as producer. The story's scenario was written by Masaaki Karube. Masafumi Kamio served as the game's art director. The music was composed by Naoko Ishii, Hiroshi Tanabe, and Waichiro Ozaki. The game was released in Japan on December 9, 1999. In North America, it was released simultaneously with the Game Boy Color title Yu-Gi-Oh! Dark Duel Stories on March 19, 2002, making them the first two video games in the franchise to be released in the territory. The game was released in Europe on March 7, 2003.

== Reception ==
Reception

Aggregate score
Aggregator	Score
Metacritic	57/100

Review scores
Publication	Score
Consoles +	86%
GamePro	3/5
GameSpot	5.9/10
GameZone	6/10
Jeuxvideo.com	14/20
Official U.S. PlayStation Magazine	1.5/5

Yu-Gi-Oh! Forbidden Memories received "mixed" reviews according to the video game review aggregator website Metacritic. The game was deemed more suitable for established fans of the franchise who are prepared to take time to experiment and take notes. Critics warned that the difficulty and learning curve were unfriendly to newcomers, as the game lacks any tutorial or practice mode, and the fusion combinations can only be discovered through trial and error. Nicolas "Cony" Guerdin of Consoles + blamed the random card distribution for frequently leaving the player with an inferior hand against opponents with access to overpowered monsters. Tha Wiz of GameZone, complaining of the abrupt spikes in difficulty that follow strings of easy opponents, similarly described an adversary's consistent deployment of powerful fusions. Gerald Villoria of GameSpot warned that selecting certain dialogue options at the beginning of the game may pit the player against fairly difficult opponents, leading to constant saving and reloading. Romendil of Jeuxvideo.com criticized the inability to retreat from overly powerful duelists, as well as the game's single-save structure that prevented him from saving after each duel. Gary Steinman of Official U.S. PlayStation Magazine derided the duels as having no strategy, calling them "bash-fests" decided by the strongest card. Romendil and Steinman respectively saw the requirement of separate memory cards for two-player duels and the reliance on external passwords to obtain better cards as inconveniences. Karim "Kael" Lazla of Consoles + was an outlier, appreciating the game's increased comprehensiveness and complexity over Yu-Gi-Oh! Dark Duel Stories, though he remarked that the fusion mechanic can make duels too easy.

The technical presentation received mixed commentary. Tha Wiz and Villoria commended the character artwork as clean and colorful, while Tha Wiz spoke less fondly of the three-dimensional battle sequences, describing them as pixelated, choppy, and time-consuming, and he welcomed the option to bypass the animations. Romendil felt similarly about the 3D graphics, deeming them unimpressive compared to the summons in later Final Fantasy titles on the same console. Tha Wiz described the music as unspectacular but adequate in setting the atmosphere, while Romendil dismissed it as "hard to bear" and unrelated to the animated series' soundtrack. (Note: Yu-Gi-Oh! Forbidden Memories was originally released in December 1999, four months before the premiere of Yu-Gi-Oh! Duel Monsters.) Villoria and Steinman praised the deck-management and card-play interface for its clarity and ease of use. Romendil faulted the French translation for its lack of polish.

In Japan, the game sold 510,804 units. In its first full month of release in North America, it was the 16th best-selling video game, and remained within the top 20 best-selling video games for the next six months, briefly reappearing on the chart in January 2003. By 2004, the game sold 2 million units in the United States and Europe.
