= Shunsuke Kazama =

Japanese actor and television personality

- 風間 俊介
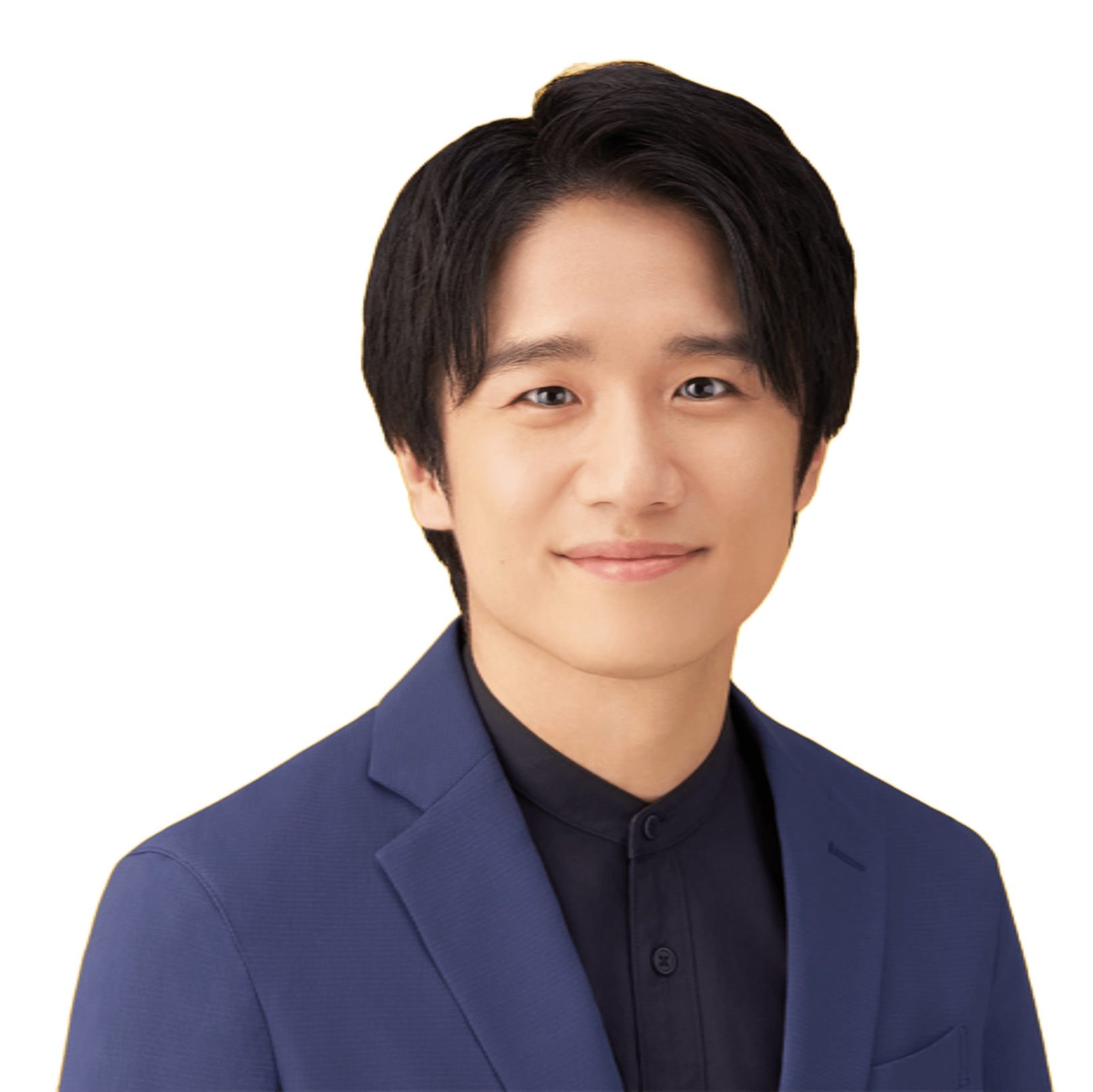
- Born: June 17, 1983 (age 43); Sumida, Tokyo, Japan
- Occupations: Actor; television personality
- Years active: 1997–present
- Notable work: Yu-Gi-Oh! as Yugi Muto
- Children: 1

Shunsuke Kazama (風間 俊介, Kazama Shunsuke; born June 17, 1983) is a Japanese actor and television personality.

== Career ==
In 1997, when Kazama was in his second year of junior high school, he entered Johnny & Associates and started activities as a trainee. He made his debut on stage that same year in a Shonentai stage play.

In 1999, he played Kenjiro Kanesue in Kinpachi-sensei. His performance earned him the Nikkan Sports Drama Grand Prix award for Best Newcomer.

In 2002, Kazama was member of unit "FOURTOPS" with fellow trainees Tomohisa Yamashita, Toma Ikuta, and Jun Hasegawa. The quartet hosted Shounen Club, a Johnny's Jr. variety show. In September 2003, Yamashita was chosen to be a member of a new unit, News. FOURTOPS was dissolved with News' debut, and the remaining members would focus on acting. They reunited in 2018 for Fuji Television's Year-End show Johnny's Countdown as back dancers for duo Tackey & Tsubasa, just as they did in the group's original days, for the duo's final appearance on the show.

In 2011, Kazama won a Television Drama Academy Award for Best Supporting Actor.

He was a member of TU→YU in 2008, along with V6's Hiroshi Nagano, NEWS's Takahisa Masuda, Hey! Say! JUMP's Hikaru Yaotome and actor Tatsuya Takeda.

He starred in the feature-length film Maebashi Visual Kei, as a young farmer who tries to make it big in a visual kei band.

When fellow Johnny Kazunari Ninomiya from Arashi, with whom Kazama has a close friendship, opened Twitter in 2023, he included a link to Kazama's Johnny's Web profile as if it were his own, much to the amusement of both their fans.

Mostly known as an actor, Kazama's musical career is basically non-existent, except for a few units at the beginning. So he was happy to receive a present from fellow Johnny and long time friend (Arashi's) Masaki Aiba. On 28 September 2023, at the last airing of the program VS Damashii in which both appeared, Aiba as "captain" and he as "assistant captain". Aiba gifted Kazama (and all the Damashii members) a CD copy of the show's theme song "New Again! Again and again!" saying, "Congratulations on your CD debut, Kazama-kun", to what Kazama responded, "This is the first CD that includes my voice in 26 years (of my entertainment career)."

It was announced on 16 December 2023 that Kazama would be leaving the agency by year's end, to work as a freelance actor.

After over 7 years as Monday personality in the Nippon Television morning show "Zip!" it was announced that Kazama would leave on March 23, 2026.

A long–time fan of all things Disney, it was announced that Kazama would be appointed as a special supporter of the "Pixar World Exhibition" to be held at Crevia Base Tokyo in Toyosu, Tokyo from March 20, 2026. The "Mundo Pixar Experience" has already toured 7 cities as of February 2026, including Barcelona (Spain), Rio de Janeiro (Brazil), Seoul (South Korea) and London (United Kingdom). Kazama was excited to have in Tokyo the exhibition were people can visit life-size sets of different Pixar movies.

On March 4, 2026, it was announced that Kazama, together with Yūmi Nagashima, was appointed as presenter for the JR East's Train Channel's Train TV's new program Urban Information Navigator GoodMove! (都市型情報ナビゲーター GOODMOVE!, Toshigata jōhō nabigētā GOODMOVE). The program's contents will include from useful information for daily life to current trends and popular places to visit, all information tailored to consumers' daily commutes.

== Personal life ==
Kazama married a non-celebrity woman in 2013, after dating for ten years. According to some gossip sites and fan blogs, Kazama's wife is former actress Kazuna Kawamura. Kawamura and Kazama met in 2004 during the performance of the play "Claudia", a first for Kawamura, who relied in the experience that Kazama had at that time. According to those sites, the pair started dating when the play ended. When it came time to get married, months before, Kawamura announced her retirement from the industry. When Kazama reported the marriage, he named her as a non-celebrity woman, to keep prying eyes from their private life.

Kazama and his wife are parents of a boy, born around 2016. His existence was unknown until the child was 3 years old. According to people who have worked with him, Kazama is a very private person, and it isn't his intention to keep hidden his private life, just that he rarely speaks about it.

On December 22, 2020, Kazama's talent agency announced that he had tested positive for COVID-19. He made a full recovery on January 4.

== Filmography ==
=== Film ===
Year	Title	Role	Notes	Ref.
2011	Maebashi Visual Kei	Takuji		
2012	Ninkyo Helper	Seiji Yamagiwa		
2013	Suzuki Sensei	Yuji Katsuno		
2013	Petal Dance	Kawada		
2015	Z Island	Shigeru		
2016	Cats Don't Come When You Call	Mitsuo Sugita	Lead role	
2016	Everest: The Summit of the Gods	Buntaro Kishi		
2016	Midori: The Camellia Girl	Wanda Masamitsu		
2016	Black Widow Business	Hiroshi		
2021	Every Trick in the Book	Hideyoshi Kochi		
2024	Sensei's Pious Lie	Masami Hayafuji		
2025	How Dare You?			
2026	Between Two Lovers	Kentaro Inui		
2027	10 Things I Want to Do Before I Turn 40: The Movie	Suzume Tojo	Lead role	

=== Television ===
Year(s)	Title	Role	Notes	Ref.
1999−2004	Kinpachi-sensei	Kenjiro Kanesue	3 seasons	
2003	Taikouki Saru to Yobareta Otoko	Koichiro	Television film	
2006	Akihabara@Deep	Page	Lead role	
2011	Still, Life Goes On	Kenji Amemiya		
2011−2012	Chūgakusei Nikki	Shunsuke Kanazawa		
2012−2013	Jun and Ai	Itoshi Machida / Jun Machida	Asadora	
2013	Matching Love	Kanata Tokui	Television film	
2014	Boku no Ita Jikan	Mamoru Mizushima		
2014	Keiji	Kiyoshi Nagai	Television film	
2014	Asunaro San San Nana Byoushi	Sho Hosaka		
2014−2015	Bonkura	Sakichi		
2015	Keisei Saimin no Otoko	Kojima Shingo		
2016	99.9 Criminal Lawyer	Kazuki Yamashita		
2017	Gekokujo Juken	Narasaki Tetsuya		
2017	Rikuoh	Taro Sakamoto		
2018	Segodon	Hashimoto Sanai	Taiga drama	
2020−2021	Awaiting Kirin	Tokugawa Ieyasu	Taiga drama	
2021−2022	Come Come Everybody	Haruhiko Katagiri	Asadora	
2022	Silent	Masaki Haruo		
2023	Hatsukoi, Zarari	Ryuji Okamura	Lead role	
2024	Unmet: A Neurosurgeon's Diary	Hirotsugu Emoto	Episode 1	
2025	Unbound	Tsuruya Kiemon	Taiga drama	
2025	10 Things I Want to Do Before I Turn 40	Suzume Tojo	Lead role	
2026	Plastic Beauty			

== TV variety and other programs ==
- Zip! (Monday's main personality) (2018–2026) (NTV)
- VS Damashii (Team's assistant captain) (2021-2023) (Fuji TV)

=== Other non-TV programs ===
- Urban Information Navigator GoodMove! (都市型情報ナビゲーター GOODMOVE!, Toshigata jōhō nabigētā GOODMOVE) (JR East's Train Channel's Train TV, April 2026)

== Animation ==
- Yu-Gi-Oh! Duel Monsters (2000−2004) − Yugi Mutou/Yami Yugi
- Yu-Gi-Oh! Duel Monsters GX (2004−2008) − Yugi Mutou/Yami Yugi
- Yu-Gi-Oh! The Movie: Pyramid of Light (2005) − Yugi Mutou/Yami Yugi
- Yu-Gi-Oh!: Bonds Beyond Time (2010) − Yugi Mutou/Yami Yugi
- From Up On Poppy Hill (2011) − Shirō Mizunuma & Hiroshi Tachibana
- Yu-Gi-Oh!: The Dark Side of Dimensions (2016) − Yugi Mutou/Yami Yugi

== Video games ==
- Yu-Gi-Oh! Duel Monsters Saikyo Card Battle (2016) – Yugi Mutou/Yami Yugi
- Yu-Gi-Oh! Duel Links (2016) − Yugi Mutou/Yami Yugi
- Jump Force (2019) − Yugi Mutou/Yami Yugi
- Yu-Gi-Oh! Cross Duel (2022) – Yami Yugi

== Stage ==
Year	Title	Role	Venue	Ref.
1997	Johnny's Fantasy Kyo to Kyo			
2000	Big: Yume wa Kanau	Billy Copepki	Tokyo International Forum, Tokyo	
2000	Millennium Shock	Company worker Jun (understudy)	Imperial Theatre, Tokyo	
2001−2002	Show-geki Shock	Company worker Jun (understudy)	Imperial Theatre, Tokyo	
2002	Playzone 2002: Yoshifumi	Policeman; Townsperson (understudy)	Aoyama Theatre, Tokyo; Festival Hall, Osaka	
2003	Shock is Real Shock	Shunsuke	Imperial Theatre, Tokyo	
2003	Playzone 2003: Vacation	Local correspondent Terrorist boy Soldier	Aoyama Theatre, Tokyo; Festival Hall, Osaka	
2004	Shocking Shock	Shunsuke	Imperial Theatre, Tokyo	
2004	Chikyū Gorgeous Vol 7. "Claudia"	Dragon child	Nissay Theatre, Tokyo; Aichi Arts Centre, Nagoya; Fukuoka Sunpalace, Fukuoka; Festival Hall, Osaka; Niigata Terrsa, Niigata	
2004−2005	West Side Story	Chino	Aoyama Theatre, Tokyo; Orix Theater, Osaka	
2004	Chikyū Gorgeous 10th Anniversary "Claudia"	Dragon child	Aoyama Theatre, Tokyo; NHK Osaka Hall, Osaka	
2006	Fall Guy	Yasu	Aoyama Theatre, Tokyo; Theater Brava!, Osaka	
2007	Takizawa Enbujō 2007	Saburo	Shinbashi Enbujō, Tokyo	
2008	Koi wa Comedy	Pierre	Japan Tour	
2008	Full House	Seiya	Panasonic Globe Theatre, Tokyo; Hyogo Performing Arts Center, Nishinomiya	
2008	Frying Pan and Handgun	Shigeta	Panasonic Globe Theatre, Tokyo; Sankei Hall, Osaka	
2009	Kagotsurube	Rikkyo	Aoyama Theatre, Tokyo; NHK Osaka Hall, Osaka	
2010	Alibi no nai Tenshi	Masashi Tada	Panasonic Globe Theatre, Tokyo; Sankei Hall, Osaka	
2010	Believer	Steven	Setagaya Public Theater, Tokyo; Umeda Arts Theater, Osaka; Fukuoka Civic Hall, Fukuoka; Denryoku Hall, Sendai	
2011	Watashi wa Dare!?	Kunike Nomura	Mitsukoshi Theater, Tokyo	
2011	Destiny 30 − Delux The Ninth Live	Aran	Telepia Hall, Nagoya; Umeda Arts Theater, Osaka; Sunshine Theatre, Tokyo	
2011	Watashi wa Dare!? Replay	Kunike Nomura	Shin Kabuki-za, Osaka	
2012	Otoko no Hanamichi	Kosuke Tōdō	Shin Kabuki-za, Osaka; Hashima City Arts Centre, Hashima; Le Theatre Ginza by Parco, Tokyo	
2014	Chikyū Gorgeous Vol 13. "Kuzariāna no Tsubasa"	Gankutsu	Akasaka ACT Theater, Tokyo; Aichi Arts Centre, Nagoya; Canal City Theater, Fukuoka; Umeda Arts Theater, Osaka	
2014	Sakamoto Yūji Rōdoku geki 2014		Sogetsu Hall, Tokyo	
2014	Rōsoku Rōdoku Nakameguro		Woody Theatre, Tokyo	
2015	Better Half	Yūta Suwa	Honda Theatre, Tokyo; Sankei Hall, Osaka; Yomiuri Otemachi Hall, Tokyo	
2015	Baghdad Zoo no Bengal Tiger		New National Theatre Tokyo	
2016	Kokami@network Vol 14. Intolerance no Matsuri	Kengo Sado	Space Zero, Tokyo; Theater Brava!, Osaka; Yomiuri Otemachi Hall, Tokyo	
2016	Dragon Quest Live Spectacle Tour	Terry	Saitama Super Arena, Saitama; Fukuoka Convention Center, Fukuoka; Nippon Gaishi Hall, Nagoya; Osaka-jō Hall, Osaka; Yokohama Arena, Yokohama	
2017	Better Half Replay	Yūta Suwa	Honda Theatre, Tokyo; Winc Aichi, Aichi; Kurume City Plaza, Fukuoka; Sankei Hall, Osaka	
2024	Monster	Tom	Matsushita IMP Hall (Osaka); New National Theatre (Tokyo); Fukuoka City Minami Civic Center Cultural Hall (Fukuoka)	
2025	Fróis: His Death, Not Chronicled	Fróis	Kinokuniya Southern Theater (Tokyo); Umeda Arts Theater Drama City (Osaka)	

== Awards and nominations ==
Year	Award	Category	Work	Result	Ref.
2011	70th The Television Drama Academy Awards	Best Supporting Actor	Still, Life Goes On	Won	
