= Yugi Mutou =

Fictional character from Yu-Gi-Oh!

- Yu-Gi-Oh! character
- Yugi (left) and Dark/Yami Yugi (right): Takahashi used the shapes of the eyes to distinguish the personalities of the characters.
- First appearance: Yu-Gi-Oh! chapter 1, "The Puzzle of the Gods" (September 17, 1996)
- Created by: Kazuki Takahashi
- Voiced by: Japanese; Megumi Ogata (1998–1999); Shunsuke Kazama (2000–present); English; Dan Green

In-universe information
- Family: Unnamed parents
- Relatives: Sugoroku Mutou (grandfather; also known as Solomon Muto)

Yugi Mutou (Japanese: 武藤 遊戯, Hepburn: Mutō Yūgi; also spelled Muto or Moto) is a fictional character and the titular main protagonist of the Yu-Gi-Oh! manga series created by Kazuki Takahashi. Yugi is introduced as a shy, lonely teenager who loves games and aims to solve an Ancient Egyptian artifact known as the Millennium Puzzle, hoping that it will grant him his wish of making friends. After solving the Puzzle, Yugi revives an ancient spirit initially known as Dark Yugi (闇遊戯, Yami Yūgi; Yami Yugi in the English anime); the spirit is later revealed to be that of the pharaoh Atem (王(アテム), Atemu). Over the course of the series, Yugi forms friendships with the supporting cast, interacts with Atem, and learns about his past. Besides the original manga, Yugi has also appeared in anime adaptations, films and video games based on the franchise. Throughout his appearances, his signature Duel Monsters card is the Dark Magician.

Yugi was created as a weak, young man who is interested in games and becomes a hero when playing them. According to Takahashi, through this trait, Yugi emphasizes the series' themes; friendship and the enjoyment of games. Atem was created as a hero who would appeal to young children through his strong characterization.

Critical reception to Yugi has been mixed; some writers found Dark Yugi to be too dark for the series, but others praised the development of both him and Yugi. His role in movies, mostly The Dark Side of Dimensions, was also praised for featuring a more mature version of him.

== Creation and development ==
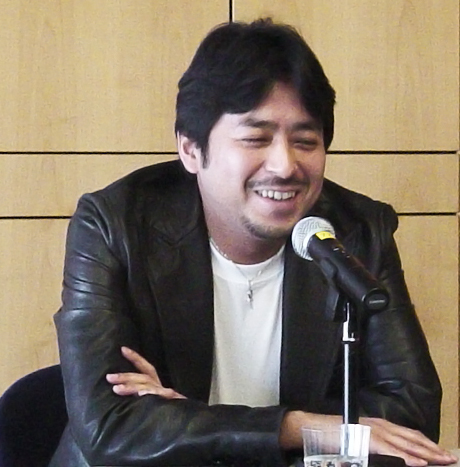
Kazuki Takahashi

Kazuki Takahashi had always been interested in games; he was obsessed with them as a child, an interest which he maintained as an adult. He believed games made players into heroes, and decided to base the Yu-Gi-Oh! series around these games with this idea as the premise. He depicted these themes through Yugi, a weak, childish boy who became a hero when he played games. Friendship is another major theme of Yu-Gi-Oh!; Takahashi based the names of the two major characters, "Yūgi" and "Jōnouchi", on the word yūjō (友情), which means "friendship". Henshin (変身, Henshin; lit. Transform), the ability to turn oneself into something or someone else, is something Takahashi believed all children dream of. He considered Yugi's "henshin" Dark Yugi, a savvy and invincible player of games, to appeal to children.

Takahashi also believed that modern society focuses too much on winners and losers. He stated that both Yugi and Katsuya Jonouchi (Joey Wheeler in the English anime) had more potential as characters because they focus on enjoying games rather than aiming to win. He also felt that Dark Yugi and Seto Kaiba are weaker characters despite the former's heroic traits. As a result, he believes Dark Yugi is at his best when he is being supported by the rest of the cast.

According to Takahashi, Yugi and Kaiba are rivals, and they are not close friends. He believes, however, the most important part of their relationship is before Yugi's duel against Marik's alter-ego. Before the game begins, Kaiba passes Yugi a card that could help him in the game. This scene felt like one of the most difficult scenes to write because of the pair's rivalry.

Yugi was given a hairstyle that would fit the style of shōnen manga, and both Yugis had the same hair, even though Takahashi initially considered giving them different hairstyles to convey different personalities. Takahashi described the hairdo as "an open hand with hints of a dried autumn leaf." The colorized versions initially used red to show emphasis, though Takahashi later used magenta in place of red to make it easier to shade the hairstyle. The little Yugi form was given a round style of eyes to convey a softer personality, while Dark Yugi had a contrasting facial style to show that he has a different personality. Atem was derived from Tutankhamun.

Megumi Ogata voiced Yugi in the first anime adaption of the manga, with Shunsuke Kazama replacing her for the following one. Dan Green voiced both Yugi and Dark Yugi in U.S. anime episodes. Ogata recalls that the director chose her to voice Yugi and told her, "I can feel the scent of darkness from you" which she believes refers to Yugi's anti-heroic alter-ego. This work was raised from scratch when Kazama had no experience as a voice actor and did not know how to do it. Due to the latest movie taking place after the finale, Kazama portrayed him as being more mature. Green has used two voice pitches for Yugi and Dark Yugi's voices and enjoyed the parodies his work led to, such as Yu-Gi-Oh!: The Abridged Series.

== Appearances ==
=== In Yu-Gi-Oh! ===
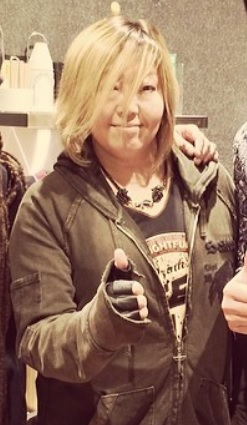
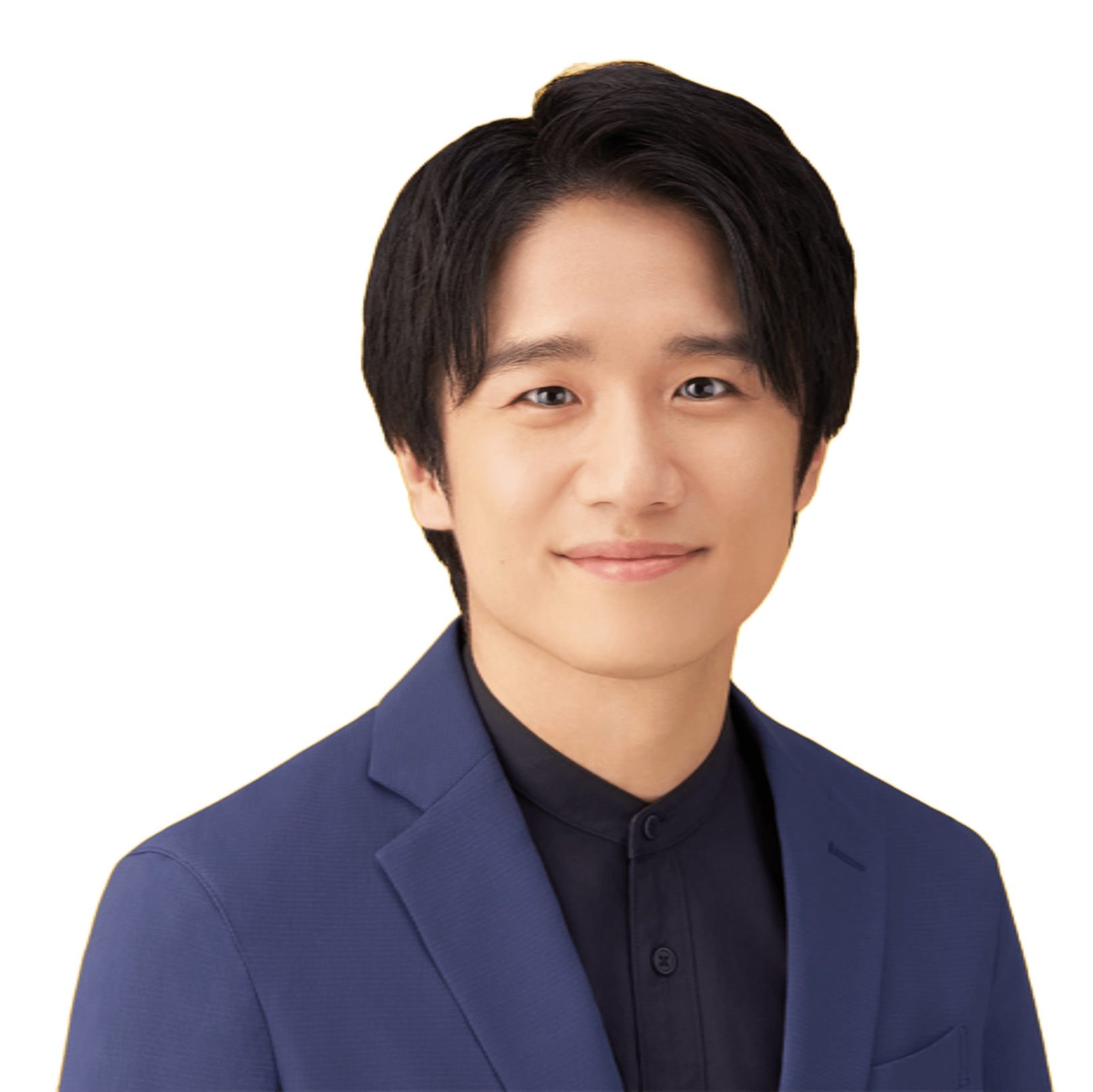
Megumi Ogata (left) and Shunsuke Kazama (right) voiced Yugi

Yugi Mutou is the titular main protagonist of the story. In the manga's first chapter, he tries to complete the Millennium Puzzle (千年パズル, Sennen Pazuru), one of the seven Millennium Items and an ancient Egyptian artifact, in hopes it will grant his wish of obtaining friends. However, he is bullied by two classmates, Katsuya Jonouchi and Hiroto Honda (Tristan Taylor in the English anime), with the former stealing a piece of the puzzle. When the school's hall monitor Ushio beats them up, Yugi comes to the bullies' defense and is beaten up by Ushio in the process. This causes Jonouchi to return the stolen piece to Yugi's grandfather Sugoroku, who later gives Yugi the piece. Yugi is able to complete the Millennium Puzzle, causing him to become possessed by another person. According to the book of the dead, whoever solves the Millennium puzzle inherits the Dark Games and becomes the guardian of right who passes judgement on evil. The second personality inhabiting Yugi's body, who is referred to as Dark Yugi and, in the manga, is known by epithets such as the Game King (遊戯王, Yūgiō; King of Games in most English translations), helps Yugi when he is in trouble. He challenges bullies and criminals to occult judgment games called Dark Games (闇のゲーム, Yami no Gēmu; Shadow Games in the English anime) and enforces Penalty Games (罰ゲーム, Batsu Gēmu) to enact justice against evil—the default powers of a Millennium Item wielder.

After Dark Yugi defeats Ushio in a game, Yugi becomes friends with Jonouchi. Across the following chapters, he also forms bonds with other characters, most notably his crush, Anzu Mazaki (Téa Gardner in the English anime), who develops a crush on Yugi's alter-ego, and Honda. He also meets Seto Kaiba, who is obsessed with the card game Duel Monsters. He takes the Blue Eyes White-Dragon from Yugi while at school—the card actually belonging to Yugi's grandfather, Sugoroku Mutou (Solomon Muto in the English dub), who got it from a friend— and swaps it for a fake. After Kaiba destroys the card and psychologically tortures Sugoroku, Yugi and his friends enter Kaiba's Death-T challenge to stop him. Yugi and Kaiba duel, and after Yugi defeats him it results in a rivalry, as Kaiba seeks to have a rematch against both Yugi and Dark Yugi.

Shortly after Kaiba's defeat, Yugi receives an invitation to the Duel Monsters tournaments, held by Maximillion J. Pegasus (Pegasus J. Crawford in Japanese versions). To lure him out, Pegasus steals Sugoroku's soul using his Millennium Eye. Yugi and Jonouchi go to the tournament, with the latter seeking to use the prize money to use it for an operation to restore his sister's eyesight. Along with Anzu and Honda, Yugi and Jonouchi defeat multiple duelists, but Yugi is forced to let himself be defeated by Kaiba; the soul of Mokuba Kaiba, Kaiba's brother, had also been stolen. With the help of a former rival, Mai Kujaku (Mai Valentine in the English anime), Yugi manages to reach Pegasus' mansion. Following the tournament, Yugi and Dark Yugi defeat Pegasus. While Pegasus restores the stolen souls, Yugi gives Jonouchi the prize money for the medical treatment of his sister, Shizuka Kawai (Serenity Wheeler in the English anime).

Some time after Pegasus' tournament, Dark Yugi learns from Ishizu Ishtar that he was once a Pharaoh, but his memory was erased during a conflict. Shortly after this, Kaiba announces his own tournament – Battle City – where the losers must give the winner their most valuable card. A group of hunters led by Ishizu's corrupted younger brother, Marik, are set to challenge Yugi, having a vendetta against the Pharaoh. In one duel, Yugi is faced by Slifer, the Sky Dragon (Osiris in Japanese versions): one of the three Egyptian God Cards which are recognized as the three strongest cards. Yugi defeats Marik's hunter and earns Slifer, which he later uses to defeat Yami Bakura and confront Kaiba in a rematch, who uses the second God Card: Obelisk the Tormentor. Yugi ultimately defeats Kaiba and obtains Obelisk. In the finale, Yugi faces Marik's own darker alter-ego, who possesses the third God Card: The Winged Dragon of Ra. Using a card Kaiba had given him, Yugi defeats Marik, obtains Ra, and becomes the tournament's champion.

Yami Yugi's original Pharaoh appearance while commanding the God Slifer (Osiris in Japanese versions)

During the final story arc of the manga, Dark Yugi uses the three God Cards to learn of his past, and is transported to an alternate version of his life where he lived as a pharaoh. During this time, the Pharaoh clashes with Yami Bakura while Yugi and his friends search for a way to aid him. At the end of the manga, it is revealed that his name as Pharaoh was Atem (アテム, Atemu), who sealed his soul into the Puzzle along with the Great God of Evil, Zorc Necrophades. The group is able to defeat Zorc and his avatar, Dark Bakura. After this, Yugi engages Atem in a final duel to help him move on to the afterlife.

=== In other media ===
In Yu-Gi-Oh! R, which takes place following Yugi's victory in the Battle City tournament. Yako Tenma, student and adopted son of Maximillion Pegasus, decides to avenge his teacher's defeat at the hands of Yugi, believing him to be responsible for Pegasus' alleged death. Tenma kidnaps Anzu, prompting Yugi and his friend Jonouchi to face Tenma's RA Project and the duel professors.

He also appears in Yu-Gi-Oh! Capsule Monsters, where he goes with his friends to find the missing Solomon Muto. Along their journey, Yugi realizes they have been transported into the world of Capsule Monsters.

The film Yu-Gi-Oh! The Movie: Pyramid of Light follows a new duel between Yugi and Kaiba with the latter being used by an ancient undead Egyptian lord known as Anubis, who seeks to kill the Pharaoh for revenge.

In Yu-Gi-Oh! GX, an adult Yugi meets aspiring duelist Jaden Yuki and gifts him the card Winged Kuriboh before wishing him luck. He from offscreen donates a copy of his deck to a museum, but it is stolen and Jaden duels the thief, who uses the cards and imitates Yugi, to get it back. On a field trip, Jaden and his friends try to visit Yugi's home, but he is not there and his grandfather says he went on a journey. In the finale, Yugi somehow transports Jaden back in time to duel his younger self who still had the Pharaoh.

Yugi also appears in Yu-Gi-Oh! Bonds Beyond Time, where he teams up with the duelists Jaden Yuki and Yusei Fudo to defeat the mysterious Paradox to save both Duel Monsters and their timelines.

In Yu-Gi-Oh! The Dark Side of Dimensions, a film which takes place after the events of the manga, Yugi and his friends are in their final year of high school and deciding on what they will do in the future. They are antagonized by Kaiba, who wishes to face the Pharaoh, who has since moved on to the afterlife. Yugi proves to be an incredibly capable duelist even without the Pharaoh's assistance, defeating the antagonist Aigami (a.k.a. Diva) in one duel and cornering Kaiba in another. Nevertheless, in the final duel, the Pharaoh briefly appears to assist Yugi in defeating the corrupted Aigami.

The video game Yu-Gi-Oh! Forbidden Memories follows the Pharaoh's life in Egypt until he is sealed into the Millennium Puzzle. Yugi inherits the puzzle and gathers each Millennium Item, which allows the Pharaoh to deal with his enemies until he keeps peace in his world.

In Yu-Gi-Oh! The Falsebound Kingdom, Yugi, Joey, Tristan, Téa and Bakura are invited to the testing of the virtual reality game "Kingdom," which was created by the company SIC. Upon entering the game, they soon find themselves trapped within it, and must summon the help of the game's characters and monsters to defeat the game's villain, Emperor Heishin, and stop the plans of the game's designer, Scott Irvine, to control the three Egyptian God cards. Yu-Gi-Oh! Duel Links features Yami Yugi as a playable character.

== Reception ==
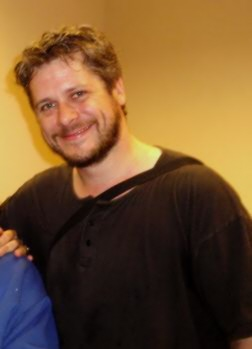
Dan Green has voiced Yugi in all of his U.S. English appearances.

As the protagonist and franchise mascot of one of the most popular anime of all time, Yugi is considered to be an iconic character in animation, and is often compared to characters like Ash Ketchum as a figurehead in popularizing anime to a wider audience, as well as corresponding merchandise to people outside of Japan. In an "Anime! Anime!" poll, Yugi was rated as the 9th most popular character voiced by Megumi Ogata.

Critical reception to Yugi and Atem has been mixed. In the book Manga: The Complete Guide, Jason Thompson noted that while Yugi and his friends often end up in complicated situations during the series' first chapters, the portrayal of Dark Yugi might come across as negative due to his actions. During later episodes, however, Thompson viewed Dark Yugi as an admirable "super hero". In 2013, Thompson again noted Dark Yugi's behavior when playing "Penalty Games" on criminal or bullies, and that he was similar to Batman and Superman because he does not kill enemies, but instead gives them gruesome fates. Fred Ladd also noted Yugi's weakness is due to his inability to deal with bullies, and that his alter-ego seeks revenge for their actions. Ladd said that Yugi and Dark Yugi developed as characters during the introduction of card games, which are important to the setting, to the series. Thompson agreed, noting that despite Yugi winning most of his duels, Takahashi produces enough drama to make the reader wonder whether he would lose against Pegasus or Marik based on their apparent advantages when playing the game. Briana Lawerence from Mania Entertainment was harsher towards Yugi's actions in the series; she found that Yugi was so nearly unbeatable at Duel Monsters that it was almost pointless for new duelists to challenge him.

THEM Anime Reviews criticized Yugi's characterization and design in 4Kids' adaptation of the manga's second anime series, with the website citing him as a stereotype. DVD Talk was confused by the way Yugi transforms whenever he plays a game because it left the Millennium Puzzle as a mystery. Dan Green's English performance as Yugi has been praised alongside Eric Stuart as Kaiba. While finding Yugi's victories in the anime ridiculous, Fandom Post still enjoyed his actions; the reviewer also praised Yami Yugi's origins and actions as a pharaoh, and the way he engages Bakura. The origins of the Pharaoh and his relationship with the priest Seto, Kaiba's previous life, were also praised. For the final duel between Yugi and Dark Yugi, Thompson praised Takahashi's writing because through this duel, both the Pharaoh and the reader are given the message to accept death, while Yugi must accept loneliness and become a stronger man.

Critics have also commented upon Yugi's role in the movies based on the franchise. DVD Talk found Yugi's troubled situation as Duel Monsters' champion as an annoyance due to its execution, but still felt young children would enjoy it. While enjoying the duel between the protagonists and the villain in Bonds Beyond Time', UK Anime Network found the three duelists perform moves necessary to introduce their most iconic characters. While reviewing Dark Side of Dimensions, IGN praised Yugi's growth alongside his friends' as they interact, making them more mature than in the manga and anime. IGN, however, wrote that although Yugi appears to be the movie's main character, he is overshadowed by Kaiba. Anime News Network said the emotional impact of the split between Yugi and the Pharaoh was impactful and that the latter's cameo during the finale left a good impression. The Fandom Post criticized the obsessive relationship between Kaiba and the Pharaoh, which came across as romantic. Green's performance as the holographic Pharaoh was praised, as was the regular Yugi's rivalry with Kaiba.

Takahashi and Mike Mignola, the creator of Hellboy, participated in an art exchange in which Takahashi drew Hellboy with Yugi's hairstyle, a Millennium Puzzle, and a duel disk, and Mignola drew Hellboy wearing a Millennium Puzzle and a Yugi T-shirt.
