= List of Yu-Gi-Oh! Arc-V chapters =

Yi-Gi-Oh spinoff chapters

This is a list of chapters for Yu-Gi-Oh! Arc-V and Yu-Gi-Oh! Arc-V: Saikyō Duelist Yuya!!, two Yu-Gi-Oh! manga spin-off titles, adapting Yu-Gi-Oh! Arc-V anime. Yu-Gi-Oh! Arc-V is written by Shin Yoshida and illustrated by Naohito Miyoshi. It was published by Shueisha and serialized by V-Jump from August 21, 2015, to April 19, 2019. Yu-Gi-Oh! Arc-V Saikyō Duelist Yuya!! is written by Akihiro Tomonaga. It was published by Shueisha and serialized by Saikyō Jump from April 3, 2015, to August 3, 2017.

== Yu-Gi-Oh! Arc-V ==
No.	Title	Original release date	English release date
1	The Name is Phantom!! Sono Na wa Fantomu!! (その名はファントム！！)	April 4, 2016; 978-4-08-880611-2	April 4, 2017; 978-1-4215-8762-2
Scale 1: "The Name is Phantom!!" (その名はファントム！！, Sono Na wa Fantomu!!); Scale 2: "Yuto vs. Sawatari!!" (ユートVS沢渡！, Yūto Bāsasu Sawatari!); Scale 3: "Pendulum Summons!!" (ペンデュラム召喚！, Pendyuramu Shōkan!); Scale 4: "The Hungry Assassin!!" (飢えた刺客！, Ueta Shikaku!); Scale 5: "Assault! Raid Raptors!!" (強襲！RR！！, Kyōshū! Reido Raputāzu!!); Scale 6: "Feeling Alive!!" (生きている実感！！, Ikiteiru Jikkan!!)
A mysterious Dueltainer named Yuya Sakaki, commonly called The Phantom, is on the run from Leo Corporation after hacking into their Solid Vision with Mass System. One of the LC's special unit Duelists, Shingo Sawatari finally corners The Phantom. But instead of Yuya, his alter ego Yuto reveals himself and duels Shingo before Yuya "tags" in and wins by using Pendulum Summoning. Though Yuya escapes his pursuers, he ends up being followed by Yuzu Hiiragi, who tricked the youth into signing a teaching contract to work at her father's Syu Zo Duel school to save it from bankruptcy. As Yuya's manager, Yuzu offers her help in him seeking a card known as Genesis Omega Dragon (G.O.D). But another LC Duelist, Shun Kurosaki, lures Yuya to Duel him by taking Yuzu's father, Shuzo Hiiragi, hostage. Despite his early disadvantage in midair Duel due to lacking flying monsters, Yuya defeats Shun with the combination of his monsters' Pendulum effects. Afterwards, when Yuzu and Shuzo assumed his discussion with Yuto is an act, Yuya reveals that he has three personalities besides his own.
2	Turbo Duel!! Raidingu Dyueru! (ライディングデュエル！)	October 4, 2016; 978-4-08-880798-0	September 5, 2017; 978-1-4215-9520-7
Scale 7: "Genesis Omega Dragon!!" (G・O・D！, Jeneshisu Omega Doragon!); Scale 8: "Sora's Hospitality!!" (素良のおもてなし！, Sora no Omotenashi!); Scale 9: "Fusion vs Fusion!!" (融合VS融合, Yūgō Bāsasu Yūgō); Scale 10: "The Entertainment Ends!!" (エンタメの結末！, Entame no Ketsumatsu!); Scale 11: "Turbo Duel!!" (ライディングデュエル！, Raidingu Dyueru!); Scale 12: "High-Speed Strategy!!" (高速の駆け引き！, Kōsoku no Kakehiki!); Scale 13: "The Adam Factor!!" (アダムの因子!, Adamu no Inshi!)
Revealing all he can remember, Yuya explains that threat G.O.D poses to world should it fall into the wrong hands and must find its creator. Soon after, a false lead results in Yuya dueling the LC Duelist Sora Shiun'in on a dueling field with its pain rating increased while being conflicted by the child's sob story. But Yuri, another of Yuya's personalities, surfaces and exposes Sora's deception before tagging Yuya back in to win without sinking to Sora's level. When Sora detonates the duel field in retaliation, he is rescued by a masked duelist named Ren. Yuya loses conscious from the damage dealt on him and is taken back to their hideout by his fourth persona, Yugo. Yugo then duels Ren when he entered Yuya's mind to confirm the presence of something called an Adam Factor regardless of losing their Turbo Duel. Ren also reveals that Yugo, Yuto, and Yuri were originally separate individuals that were merged with Yuya and have been the cause of Yuya's memory loss to keep him from remembering a very painful memory. Meanwhile, Reiji decides to deal with Yuya himself as he retrieves a Pendulum card that he kept at a construction site.
3	Swinging Pendulums of Destiny!! Yureru Pendyuramu! (揺れる運命の二人!)	April 4, 2017; 978-4088-81058-4	March 6, 2018; 978-1-4215-9805-5
Scale 14: "Where It Began!!!" (始まりの地！, Hajimari no Chi!); Scale 15: "It's Zero!!" (『零』, Zero); Scale 16: "Swinging Pendulums of Destiny!!" (揺れる運命の二人！(ペンデュラム), Yureru Pendyuramu!); Scale 17: "Another Fact!!" (もう一つの事実！, Mō Hitotsu no Jijitsu!); Scale 18: "An Unknown Enemy!!" (未知なる敵！, Michinaru Teki!); Scale 19: "Their Whereabouts!!" (二人の行方！, Futari no yukue!)
When Yuya comes to, he is informed of what occurred in his absence by Yuto and Yuri before being alerted to Reiji reaching their hideout. Yuya keeps Yuzu from getting involved while making an attempt to settle things peacefully with Reiji, the two both revealed to have come from two decades in the future. Furthermore, performing his own Pendulum Summon to bring out D/D/D King Zero Laplace while disabling Yuya's, Reiji explains that Yuya's father Yusho Sakaki and his father Leo Akaba were the ones that invented Pendulum Summoning and Solid Vision. But Reiji blames Yusho for stealing the G.O.D card from Leo, causing the cataclysm that destroyed their world. Their duel ended abruptly when they learn they are being spied on. Ren reveals himself, explaining the G.O.D. card is possessed by his leader Eve and that they seek the Adam Factor both youths possess to awaken the card's true power. When a cave-in occurs, Yuya and Reiji each go under the grid for two weeks with all sides getting ready for all-out war.
4	Immortal Beings!! Fushi no Sonzai! (不死の存在!)	October 4, 2017; 978-4-08-881164-2	November 6, 2018; 978-1-9747-0103-2
Scale 20: "Your Opponent is me!!" (相手は俺だ！, Aite wa Ore da!); Scale 21: "Yuya's Memories!!" (遊矢の記憶!, Yūya no Kioku!); Scale 22: "Immortal Beings!!" (不死の存在!, Fushi no Sonzai!); Scale 23: "The Trick Revealed!! (仕掛けバラし!, Shikake Barashi!); Scale 24: "The Reason They're After Us!!" (狙われる理由!, Nerawareru Riyū!) / "The Reason They're After Us!"; Scale 25: "Adam and Eve!!" (アダムとEVE！, Adamu to Ivu!)
Yuya and Yugo formulated a plan of attack against Ren, Yuya offering himself as bait before Yugo takes over to engage Ren in a Turbo Duel with Yuto and Yuri watching. But as Yugo is quickly cornered by Ren's seemingly indestructible White Aura Biphamet, Yuya nearly uncovered his memories when he finds himself back in his body due to the Adam Factor's effect on his counterparts. After Ren reveals himself to be Yugo's descendant whom Eve recruited and made into a timeless immortal, Yuya enacts the plan and destroys White Aura Biphamet with both his and Yugo's dragons. After Ren takes his leave, Yuya and Yuzu learn Reiji has been on his personal space station when confronted by Isaac. Isaac reveals to Reiji that he was a lab assistant to EVE when she and her love Adam discovered the G.O.D card and started experimenting on it. But the experiment went haywire and Adam sacrificed himself to stop the rampaging G.O.D. by taking the monster's power into himself. It resulted in Adam's essence split into two and residing within Yuya and Reiji as the Adam Factor which EVE's faction intends to extract in order to revive Adam and restore the G.O.D. card to its full power.
5	The Enemy's Hideout!! Teki no Ajito! (敵のアジト！)	April 4, 2018; 978-4-08-881450-6	March 5, 2019; 978-1-9747-0398-2
Scale 26: "Transcendent Duel!!" (超越決闘！, Chouetsu Dyueru!); Scale 27: "Reiji's Goal!!" (零児の狙い！, Reiji no Nerai!); Scale 28: "The Enemy's Hideout!!" (敵のアジト！, Teki no Ajito!); Scale 29: "Memory Duel!!" (記憶の決闘！, Kioku no Dyueru!) / Memory Duel!; Scale 30: "The World that Sora Wants!!" (素良の望む世界！, Sora no Nozomu Sekai!); Scale 31: "Satisfaction and Resignation!!" (「満足」と「諦め」！, 'Manzoku' to 'Akirame'!)
Isaac uses the multiple effects of his Mirror Imagine Deck to dominate Reiji in their duel, only to learn that his opponent purposely chose the space station as their battlefield so that his drones can locate EVE's hideout. Reiji then use the card he received from his father, D/D/D/D Super-Dimensional Sovereign Emperor Zero Paradox, to defeat Isaac. Locating the enemy's base at Antarctica, Reiji forms an alliance with Yuya as they depart together with Shun, Sawatari, and Yuzu. Once at EVE's hideout, Yuya and Yuzu separate from Reiji's group before encountering Sora at a pool containing memories of those the G.O.D card has recruited. Sora proceeds to duel Yuya while summoning his Dangerous Frightfur Nightmary, explaining that he made a pact with G.O.D to spend more time with his dying sister Miu in a time loop before leaving it so he can use the restored G.O.D. card's power to create his own personal world where he can live with Miu forever. Yuri takes over the duel when Yuya's resolve falters, using a weakening combo with his Starving Venemy Dragon and Starving Venemy Lethal Dose Dragon to win the duel while revealing Sora is only acting out of clinging guilt as his inability to continue watching Miu suffer ended his pact with G.O.D.
6	Challenge the Legends!! Densetsu ni nozome! (伝説に挑め!)	October 4, 2018; 978-4-08-881595-4	September 3, 2019; 978-1-9747-0782-9
Scale 32: "What Adam Saw!!" (アダムの見たモノ!, Adamu no Mita Mono!); Scale 33: "Eve's True Skills!!" (EVEの実力!!, EVE no Jitsuryoku!!); Scale 34: "Challenge the Legends!!" (伝説に挑め!, Densetsu ni nozome!); Scale 35: "The Four Brothers' Bond!!" (四兄弟の絆!, Yon Kyōdai no Kizuna!); Scale 36: "The Power of Bonds!!" (絆の力！, Kizuna no chikara!); Scale 37: "The Cause of Everything!!" (全ての元凶！, Subete no genkyō!)
As Yuya leaves Sora in Yuzu's care while he goes after Eve, Reiji meets Adam who reveals the true nature of the Adam Factor and the threat that the G.O.D. card poses to their world. When Yuya finds and duels Eve, he is overwhelmed by her using her powerful legacy monsters to the point that Yuto takes over the duel. But this results in the Adam Factor restoring Yuya's memories, revealing Yuto, Yugo, and Yuri to be the spirits of his brothers who died placing him before themselves when their time was being destroyed and had faked being alter egos to not burden their younger brother with guilt. But Yuya instead thanks his brothers as the four work together in summoning all their dragons to turn the tables before Eve resorts to Pendulum Summoning Genesis Omega Dragon as the monster absorbs her to continue the duel.
7	Arc of Destiny!! Unmei no kakehashi! (運命の架け橋！)	July 4, 2019; 978-4-08-881812-2	June 2, 2020; 978-1-9747-1067-6
Scale 38: "Our Pride!!" (俺達の誇り！, Oretachi no hokori!); Scale 39: "Across Time and Space!!" (時空を越えて！, Jikū o koete!); Scale 40: "The Adam Factors!!" (アダムの因子たち！, Adamu no inshi-tachi!); Scale 41: "Reiji's Power!!" (零児の持つ力！, Reiji no motsu chikara!); Scale 42: "Two G. O.D.s!!" (二つのG・O・D！, Futatsu no G・O・D!); Scale 43: "Head-to-Head Cards!!" (ガチンコカード！, Gachinko kādo!); Scale 44: "Action Battle!!" (アクション合戦！, Akushon gassen!); Scale 45: "Arc of Destiny!!" (運命の架け橋！, Unmei no kakehashi!)
Genesis Omega Dragon finally awakens during the Duel against Eve. Yuya and his friends learn that G.O.D. has been fulfilling people's desires and leading them astray to destroy humankind.

== Saikyō Duelist Yuya ==
No.	Title	Japanese release date	Japanese ISBN
1	This is my Dueling! Entertainment Duel!! Kore ga Ore no Dyueru! Entame Dyueru da!! (これがオレのデュエル！ エンタメデュエルだ！！)	July 29, 2016	978-4-08-880766-9
Chapter 1: "This is my Dueling! Entertainment Duel!!" (これがオレのデュエル！ エンタメデュエルだ！！, Kore ga Ore no Dyueru! Entame Dyueru da!!); Chapter 2: "Action Duels Can Also be Sports!?" (アクションデュエルはスポーツもあり！？, Akushon Dyueru wa Supōtsu mo Ari!?); Chapter 3: "His Name is, the Red Genius Duelist – Reiji Akaba!!" (奴の名は、赤き天才デュエリスト赤馬零児！！, Yatsu no Na wa, Akaki Tensai Dyuerisuto Akaba Reiji!!); Chapter 4: "What Lies Beyond the Entertainment!?" (エンタメの先にあるものは！？, Entame no Saki ni Aru Mono wa!?); Chapter 5: "Swing! My Pendulum!!" (振れろ！オレのペンデュラム！！, Furero! Ore no Pendyuramu!!); Chapter 6: "Duel School VS Duel Tutor!!" (デュエル塾VSデュエル家庭教師！！, Dyueru Juku Bāsasu Dyueru Kateikyōshi!!); Chapter 7: "The Opening of the Duel School Tournament!!" (デュエルスクールトーナメント開催！！, Dyueru Sukūru Tōnamento Kaisai!!)
2	Bring Smiles With Your Entertainment!! Entame de Egao o!! (エンタメで笑顔を!!)	October 4, 2017	978-4-08-881219-9
Chapter 8: "The Fortune-Telling Girl can See Through Everything!!" (占い少女は、なんでもお見通し!!, Uranai Shōjo wa, Nandemo Omito'oshi!!); Chapter 9: "Revenge Match! I'll Beat You With My Neo Entertainment!!" (リベンジマッチ！ オレのネオエンタメでぶっ倒すぜ!!, Ribenjimatchi! Ore no neoentame de buttaosu ze!!); Chapter 10: "A Tag Duel Surges! Grasp Victory With the Power of Friendship!!" (タッグデュエル勃発！ 友情の力で勝利をつかめ!!, Taggu Dyueru Boppatsu! Yūjō no Chikara de Shōri o Tsukame!!); Chapter 11: "To Eat or to be Eaten!? A Deliciously Sweet Tag Duel!!" (喰うか喰われるか!? 甘くておいしいタッグデュエル!!, Ku'u ka Kuwareru ka!? Amakute Oishī Taggu Dyueru!!); Chapter 12: "A Decisive Battle Royal!! The Four Dragons Clash!" (決戦バトルロイヤル!! 4龍激突!!, Kessen Batoru Roiyaru!! 4 Ryū Gekitotsu!); Chapter 13: "The Conclusion Draws Near!! Who Will be the Winner?!" (決着の時来たる!! 優勝は誰の手に!?, Kecchaku no Toki Kitaru!! Yūshō wa Dare no Te ni!?); Chapter 14: "Ultimate Showdown! What is the Truth Behind the Tournament?!" (頂上対決！ 大会に隠された真実とは!?, Chōjō Taiketsu! Taikai ni Kakusareta Shinjitsu to wa!?); Chapter 15: "Bring Smiles With Your Entertainment!!" (エンタメで笑顔を!!, Entame de Egao o!!)
