= List of Yu-Gi-Oh! Zexal chapters =

First volume cover

This is a list of chapters of Yu-Gi-Oh! Zexal and Yu-Gi-Oh! D Team Zexal, adaptations of Yu-Gi-Oh! Zexal anime. Yu-Gi-Oh! Zexal was, written by Shin Yoshida and illustrated by Naohito Miyoshi. It was published by Shueisha and serialized by V-Jump from December 18, 2010, to June 21, 2015. Yu-Gi-Oh! D Team Zexal was written by Akihiro Tomonaga and illustrated by Wedge Holdings. It was published by Shueisha and serialized by V-Jump from April 3, 2012, to April 3, 2014. They are two Yu-Gi-Oh! manga spin-off titles.

== Yu-Gi-Oh! Zexal ==
| No. | Title | Original release date | English release date |
|---|---|---|---|
| 1 | The Name's Yuma!! Sono Na wa Yūma!! (その名は遊馬！！) | June 3, 2011; 978-4-08-870564-4 | June 5, 2012; 978-1-4215-4902-6 |
Rank 1: "The Name's Yuma!!" (その名は遊馬！！, Sono Na wa Yūma!!); Rank 2: "A Mysterious Life-Form!?" (謎の生命体！？, Nazo no Seimeitai!?) / "A Mysterious Life Form?!"; Rank 3: "Astral!!" (アストラル！！, Asutoraru!!); Rank 4: "The Light of Hope!!" (希望の光！！, Kibō no Hikari!!); Rank 5: "The Opposite of Opposite is...!?" (ウラのウラは…！？, Ura no Ura wa…!?) / "Plot and CounterPlot?!"; Rank 6: "Yesterday's Enemy is...!?" (昨日の敵は…！？, Kinō no Teki wa…!?); Bonus: "Destined Meeting!!" (運命の出会い！！, Unmei no Deai!!)
| 2 | Numbers Hunter!! Nanbāzu Hantā!! (ナンバーズ・ハンター！！) | February 3, 2012; 978-4-08-870564-4 | December 4, 2012; 978-1-4215-4980-4 |
Rank 7: "Numbers Hunter!!" (ナンバーズ・ハンター！！, Nanbāzu Hantā!!); Rank 8: "Galaxy-Eyes Photon Dragon!!" (銀河眼の光子竜！！, Ginga-Me no Kōshi Ryū!!); Rank 9: "Kaito's True Skill!!" (カイトの実力！！, Kaito no Jitsuryoku!!); Rank 10: "New Enemies!!" (新たな敵！！, Aratana Teki!!); Rank 11: "Heartland!!" (ハートランド！！, Hāto Rando!!); Rank 12: "Corn's Secret!!" (コーンの秘密！！, Kōn no Himitsu!!)
| 3 | The Second Assassin!! Dai Ni no Shikaku!! (第2の刺客！！) | August 3, 2012; 978-4-08-870527-9 | June 5, 2013; 978-1-4215-5372-6 |
Rank 13: "The Second Assassin!!" (第2の刺客！！, Dai Ni no Shikaku!!); Rank 14: "Victory Conditions!!" (勝利への条件！！, Shōri e no Jōken!!); Rank 15: "The Bonds Between the Two!!" (2人の絆！！, Futari no Kizuna!!) / "A Shared Bond!!"; Rank 16: "The Third Enemy!!" (第3の敵！！, Dai San no Teki!!); Rank 17: "Ken-chan!!" (健ちゃん！！, Ken-chan!!) / "Frankie!!"; Rank 18: "Kaito, Again!!" (カイト、再び！！, Kaito, Futatabi!!) / "Kaito Again!!"
| 4 | Messenger from the Moon!! Tsuki Kara no Shisha!! (月からの使者！！) | February 4, 2013; 978-4-08-870624-5 | January 7, 2014; 978-1-4215-6107-3 |
Rank 19: "Messenger from The Moon!!" (月からの使者！！, Tsuki Kara no Shisha!!); Rank 20: "A Three-Way Battle!!" (三つ巴の戦い！！, Mitsudomoe no Tatakai!!); Rank 21: "Kyoji Yagumo!!" (八雲興司！！, Yagumo Kyōji!!); Rank 22: "Commander!!" (司令官！！, Shirei-kan!!); Rank 23: "Menacing Force!!" (脅威の部隊！！, Kyōi no Butai!!); Rank 24: "The Numbers War!!" (ナンバーズ大戦！！, Nanbāzu Taisen!!)
| 5 | Line World!! Rain Wārudo!! (ラインワールド！！) | August 2, 2013; 978-4-08-870794-5 | July 1, 2014; 978-1-4215-6918-5 |
Rank 25: "The 2nd Assassin!!" (第2の刺客！！, Dai Ni no shikaku!!) / "Kaito's King!!"; Rank 26: "Line World!!" (ラインワールド！！, Rain Wārudo!!); Rank 27: "Deriving Deck!!" (デッキよ導け！！, Dekki yo Michibike!!) / "Guide Us, Deck!!"; Rank 28: "A Shadow's Secret Maneuvers!!" (暗躍する影！！, Anyaku suru Kage!!) / "Shadow Maneuvers!!"; Rank 29: "Clash of the Champions!!" (強者激突！！, Tsuwa Mono Gekitotsu!!); Rank 30: "Unpredictable!!" (予測不能！！, Yosokufunō!!) / "Absolutely Unpredictable!!"
| 6 | Revealed Sin!! / Sin Revealed!! Akasareru Tsumi!! (明かされる罪！！) | February 4, 2014; 978-4-08-880018-9 | February 3, 2015; 978-1-4215-7692-3 |
Rank 31: "Save Your Friends!!" (仲間を救え！！, Nakama o Sukue!!); Rank 32: "The Power of Believing in People!!" (人を信じる力！！, Hito o Shinjiru Chikara!!); Rank 33: "Revealed Sin!!" (明かされる罪！！, Akasareru Tsumi!!) / "Sin Revealed!!"; Rank 34: "The Time of Judgement!!" (判決の時！！, Hanketsu no Toki!!) / "The Hour of Judgement!!"; Rank 35: "Parting Ways!!" (決別！！, Ketsu Betsu!!) / "Separation!!"; Rank 36: "Burnt Memories!!" (焼かれし思い出！！, Yakareshi Omoide!!) / "Incinerated Memories!!"
| 7 | The 1 of Hope!! / Just One Hope!! Kibō no Ichi!! (希望の1！！) | August 4, 2014; 978-4-08-880169-8 | September 1, 2015; 978-1421579788 |
Rank 37: "Double Duel!!" (ダブルデュエル！！, Daburu Dyueru!!); Rank 38: "FA Threat!!" (FAの脅威！！, Efu Ei no Kyōi!!) / "Full Armor Threat!!"; Rank 39: "Evolving Numbers!!" (進化するナンバーズ！！, Shinka suru Nanbāzu!!) / "The Evolving Number!!"; Rank 40: "Yagumo's Past!!" (八雲の過去！！, Yagumo no Kako!!); Rank 41: "The 1 of Hope!!" (希望の1！！, Kibō no Ichi!!) / "Just One Hope!!"; Rank 42: "The Power of Bonds!!" (絆の力！！, Kizuna no Chikara!!)
| 8 | Built-Up Bonds!! / A Bond Between Us!! Kizukiage ta Kizuna!! (築き上げた絆！！) | March 4, 2015; 978-4-08-880309-8 | March 1, 2016; 978-1421584485 |
Rank 43: "To Another World!!" (異世界へ！！, Isekai e!!) / "To the Otherworld!!"; Rank 44: "It's Our Problem!!" (オレたちの問題だ！！, Oretachi no Mondai da!!); Rank 45: "Yagumo's Original Sin!!" (八雲の原罪！！, Yagumo no Genzai!!); Rank 46: "Built-Up Bonds!!" (築き上げた絆！！, Kizukiage ta Kizuna!!) / "A Bond Between Us!!"; Rank 47: "The Deity of Despair!!" (絶望の神！！, Zetsubō no Kami!!); Rank 48: "The Four Powers!!" (4つの力！！, Yottsu no Chikara!!)
| 9 | Yuma's Kattobingu!! Yūma no Kattobingu!! (遊馬のかっとビング！！) | October 2, 2015; 978-4-08-880492-7 | September 6, 2016; 978-1421588162 |
Rank 49: "A New Hope!!" (新しい希望！！, Atarashii Kibō!!); Rank 50: "The God of Despair!!" (絶望の神！！, Zetsubō no Kami!!); Rank 51: "The Name's... Zexal!!" (その名は･･･ゼアル！！, Sono na wa... Zearu!!) / "His Name Is... Zexal!!"; Rank 52: "The Last Duel!!" (最後のデュエル！！, Saigo no dyueru!!); Rank 53: "Yuma's Tactics!!" (遊馬のタクティクス！！, Yūma no Takutikusu!!); Rank 54: "The True King of Numbers!!" (ナンバーズ真の皇！！, Nanbāzu Shin no Sumeragi!!); Rank 55: "Yuma's Kattobingu!!" (遊馬のかっとビング！！, Yūma no Kattobingu!!) / "Yuma Jets!!"

== Yu-Gi-Oh! D Team Zexal ==
- Chapter 1: "D Team Zexal Start!!" (Dチーム・ゼアル始動！！, Dī Chīmu Zearu Shidō!!) (April 3, 2012)
- Chapter 2: "An Instant Turnaround by Magic!!" (魔法で一発逆転！！, Mahō de Ippatsu Gyakuten!!) (May 3, 2012)
- Chapter 3: "Trap of the Counterattack!!" (逆転の罠！！, Gyakuten no Wana!!) (June 3, 2012)
- Chapter 4: "Conclusion of the Fierce Fight!!" (激闘決着！！, Gekitō Kecchaku!!) (July 3, 2012)
- Chapter 5: "Improving the Deck!!" (デッキ強化だぜ！！, Dekki Kyōka da ze!!) (August 3, 2012)
- Chapter 6: "A Duel with the New Deck!!" (新デッキで決闘！！, Shin Dekki de Kettō!!) (September 3, 2012)
- Chapter 7: "Preliminaries of the Duel Tournament!!" (決闘大会予選！！, Kettō Taikai Yosen!!) (October 3, 2012)
- Chapter 8: "The Duel tournament Opens!!" (デュエル大会開幕！！, Deyueru Taikai Kaimaku!!) (November 3, 2012)
- Chapter 9: "Heated Conclusion!!" (熱き決着！！, Atsuki Ketchaku!!) (December 3, 2012)
- Chapter 10: "Horror Duel!?" (ホラー決闘！？, Horā Kettō!?) (January 3, 2013)
- Chapter 11: "The Grand Finale Preliminaries!!" (予選最終戦だ！！, Yosen Saishū Sen da!!) (February 3, 2013)
- Chapter 12: "Clash! Shark!!" (激突！ シャーク！！, Gekitotsu! Shāku!!) (March 3, 2013)
- Chapter 13: "It's Kattobing!!" (かっとビングだ！！, Kattobingu Da!!) (April 3, 2013)
- Chapter 14: "Next up is the Club Activities!!" (次は部活だぜ！！, Tsugi wa Bukatsu da ze!!) (June 3, 2013)
- Chapter 15: "Chivalrous Duel!!" (騎士道デュエル！！, Kishidō Dyueru!!) (July 3, 2013)
- Chapter 16: "All-Out Duel!!" (全力の決闘！！, Zenryoku no Kettō!!) (August 3, 2013)
- Chapter 17: "Asia Champion!!" (アジアチャンピオン！！, Ajia Chanpion!!) (September 3, 2013)
- Chapter 18: "Galaxy-Eyes' Onslaught!!" (銀河眼強襲！！, Ginga Me Kyōshū!!) (October 3, 2013)
- Chapter 19: "Duel Test!!" (デュエルの課題！！, Deyueru no Kadai!!) (November 3, 2013)
- Chapter 20: "The DTC Opens!!" (D・T・C 開幕！！, Dī Tī Shī Kaimaku!!) (December 3, 2013)
- Chapter 21: "Wicked Hero!!" (悪のヒーロー！！, Aku no Hīrō!!) (January 3, 2014)
- Chapter 22: "VS The Synchro User" (VSシンクロ使い, Bāsasu Shinkuro Tsukai) (February 3, 2014)
- Chapter 23: "The Menace of Hope!!" (ホープの脅威！！, Hōpu no Kyōi!!) (March 3, 2014)
- Final Chapter: "D Team's Bonds!!" (Dチームの絆！！, Dī Chīmu no Kizuna!!) (April 3, 2014)
