= Yu-Gi-Oh! Arc-V (manga) =

Japanese manga series from 2015 to 2019

- Cover of the first manga volume, showing Yuya Sakaki and Odd-Eyes Phantom Dragon

遊☆戯☆王ARC-V (Yū Gi Ō Āku Faibu)
- Genre: Adventure, fantasy
- Created by: Kazuki Takahashi; Studio Dice
- Manga
- Written by: Shin Yoshida
- Illustrated by: Naohito Miyoshi
- Published by: Shueisha
- English publisher: NA: Viz Media
- Imprint: Jump Comics
- Magazine: V Jump
- English magazine: NA: Weekly Shonen Jump
- Original run: August 21, 2015 – April 19, 2019
- Volumes: 7
- Anime television series
- Yu-Gi-Oh! Arc-V
- Other series
- Yu-Gi-Oh!; Yu-Gi-Oh! Duel Monsters; Yu-Gi-Oh! R; Yu-Gi-Oh! GX; Yu-Gi-Oh! 5D's; Yu-Gi-Oh! Zexal; Yu-Gi-Oh! VRAINS; Yu-Gi-Oh! Sevens; Yu-Gi-Oh! Go Rush!!
- Other media
- Video games; Trading card game

Yu-Gi-Oh! Arc-V (遊☆戯☆王ARC-V, Yū Gi Ō Āku Faibu; "Arc Five") is a Japanese manga series illustrated by Naohito Miyoshi and written by Shin Yoshida. The series is an adaptation of the Yu-Gi-Oh! Arc-V anime series and uses the same characters and setting. However, the manga presents a different story from that of the anime.

The series began serialization in Shueisha's V Jump magazine in August 2015, and also began serialization by Viz Media in English in its digital Weekly Shonen Jump on August 24, 2015.

== Plot ==
The story takes place in Maiami City, where the Leo Corporation developed Solid Vision which became an inseparable part of daily life due to its ability to give physical mass to data. Its application to Duel Monsters created an interactive experience that gave rise to challenging Action Duels where duelists traverse environments to locate Action Cards to help them in a pinch.

The story follows Yuya Sakaki, a mysterious Entertainment Duelist with the ability to Pendulum Summon and little memory of his past. Nicknamed Phantom, he is on the run from the Leo Corporation after hacking into their system to freely manipulate Solid Vision technology for his own use. He has three other personalities within him: the collected Xyz Duelist Yuto, the sadistic Fusion Duelist Yuri, and the overconfident Synchro Duelist Yugo. While escaping from Leo Corp agents, Yuya meets Yuzu Hiragi who tricks him into signing a teaching contract at her father's Yu Sho Duel School in exchange for her assistance.

Yuya is later revealed to originate from Miami City two decades in the future, sent to the current timeline by his father Yusho to find a Duel Monster card of omnipotent power called "Genesis Omega Dragon" (G.O.D) that gives one the power manipulate reality itself. But Yuya finds opposition in Leo Corp's president Reiji Akaba, who is also from the future and blames Yusho for destroying their era when he stole the G.O.D. card from his father Leo Akaba. Furthermore, altering his memories unbeknownst to him so to burden him with who they really are, Yuya's alternate personalities were actually the spirits of his older brothers who merged into Yuya's body after they died protecting him during the calamity. The two parties ultimately join forces when Yuya and Reiji find themselves targeted by a third faction led by a mysterious woman called EVE, who needs the Adam Factor energy that Yuya and Reiji possess to restore G.O.D's true power so she and her followers can create an ideal reality for themselves.

After series of duels, Yuya and his brothers finally confronts EVE and G.O.D, with Yuya recovering his memories in the process. When Yuya was close to give in to G.O.D's temptation of having his whole family back, his three brothers sacrificed themselves to give their remaining powers to strengthen the Adam Factor inside Yuya, granting Yuya the card God-Eyes Phantom Dragon that eventually defeats G.O.D. The spirit of Adam than manifests and reunites with EVE, leaving together with her. However, before Yuya can destroy G.O.D, Reiji interrupts as he wishes to have G.O.D to continue his father's legacy, leading to another duel between the two. Yuya emerges victorious and destroy G.O.D, opening a path that leads to another dimension where G.O.D's creator is. Yuya, Reiji, Ren, and Isaac decides to confront the creator of G.O.D while Sora stays with Shun and Shingo. Before leaving, Yuya assures Yuzu that they are destined to meet again and gives his ace monster to her. Days after the battle, Yuzu meets the young Yusho, indicating that she'll meet Yuya again in the future like he had told her.

== Characters ==
The English version of the manga uses the Japanese human character names.

=== Main characters ===
Yuya Sakaki (榊 遊矢, Sakaki Yūya)
A Dueltainer infamously known as Phantom, Yuya hacked into Leo Corporation's Solid Vision system so he can use the system for his own use in his search for the creator of the Duel Monster card Genesis Omega Dragon (G.O.D). Yuya shares his body with the spirits of his older brothers Yuto, Yuri, and Yugo, who feigned being alter egos while wiping Yuya's memories of them. As a Dueltainer and excellent hacker, Yuya is capable of manipulating the Solid Vision technology to materialize his magic tricks that gives him advantage in Duel, usually to get an Action Card. It's revealed that he and Reiji are actually from the future, but got sent by their fathers to the present timeline after Yusho caused an incident known as World Illusion to regress time to stop the destruction of the world after G.O.D went on rampage. During the escape, Yuya was knocked out when he sacrificed himself to save his brothers from a falling debris. By the time they arrived back at home, all but one escape capsule were destroyed, so his brothers decided to let him into the capsule to save his life. Due to the impact of World Illusion, Yuya lost his memories when he arrived in the past and his brothers' spirits inside him decided to erase the memories of their relation so that he won't be saddened by their deaths. Since then, Yuya seeks G.O.D with the intent to destroy the card. Yuya possesses a power called the Adam Factor that according to Ren is necessary to awaken G.O.D, which appeared to disrupt his connection to Yuto, Yugo, and Yuri. As a result, following his duel against Reiji, Yuya undergoes training by the three to master their skills should he end up duelling on his own. It was during his duel against EVE that Yuya regain his memories of his brothers when they were separate beings while managing to overwhelm her with renewed resolve and defeat Reiji before they, Ren, and Isaac depart to confront G.O.D's creator. Yuya initially uses a Performapal/Odd-Eyes deck with his ace monsters being Odd-Eyes Phantom Dragon and Odd-Eyes Phantasma Dragon, later changing to a Four Dimensions Dragons Deck with all four dragons and God-Eyes Phantom Dragon as his ace monsters.
Yuto / Yuto Sakaki (ユート / 榊 遊斗, Yūto / Sakaki Yūto)
Pretending to be one of Yuya's alternate personalities, being serious-minded compared to Yuya, Yuto is a duellist from future who uses Xyz Summons. Yuto is revealed to Yusho's first born son, making him the eldest of Yuya's brothers. On the day that the World Illusion occurred, Yuto and his brothers were originally planned to escape together, but three of the four escape pods Yusho had prepared for them were destroyed during G.O.D's rampage. Yuto, Yuri, and Yugo agreed to put Yuya before themselves, placing him in the last escape pod as their last action alive. However, their souls somehow managed to survive and ended up in Yuya's body as he believed them to alternate personalities. Yuto, Yugo, and Yuri agreed to conceal Yuya's memories of them as his brother to spare him grief over sacrificing themselves for him. As the oldest, Yuto is the most responsible; he often scolds Yuya's recklessness and defuses bickering between Yugo and Yuri. When they first arrived to the present, Yuto acts as Yuya's "decoy" since the Leo Corporation were only given orders to find Yuya. But Yuya's reckless action and Reiji's perceptiveness led his connection with Yuya to be found out during his Duel against Sawatari. Following Yuya's duel against Reiji, Yuto begins to train Yuya for later battles. When they finally confront EVE, Yuto takes over for Yuya when he got injured, failing to corner EVE despite his best effort before Yuya regains his body while knowing the truth. Yuto uses a Phantom Knights Deck that focuses on Xyz Summon with his ace monster being Dark Anthelion Dragon which he gave to Yuya.
Yuri / Yuri Sakaki (ユーリ / 榊 遊里, Yūri / Sakaki Yūri)
Pretending to be one of Yuya's alternate personalities, sadistic while believing everyone has darkness in them, the cynical Yuri is a duellist from future who uses Fusion Summon. Yuri is actually one of Yuya's three older brothers who died together with Yuto and Yugo during G.O.D's rampage, his soul enduring and ending up inside Yuya. Concluding that Yuya would be burdened by them if he remembered how they died, Yuri, Yuto, and Yugo agreed to erase Yuya's memories involving them. Yuri first makes his presence known during Yuya's duel against Sora, berating Yuya's naivety while exposing Sora's true nature. Unfortunately, Yuri was quickly cornered when Sora directly attacked him, heavily injuring him due to the tripled damage setting set by Sora prior the Duel, leading Yuya to take over once more. He uses the Solid Vision technology in Yuya's Duel Disk to materialize a thorn whip. Despite his ruthlessness, Yuri displays deep care and strong protective streak for Yuya to the point he would mercilessly punish anyone who harm him in any way even if Yuya himself ask him not to. Helping train Yuya in later battles following his counterpart's duel against Reiji, Yuri resurfaces to once more take over Yuya's rematch duel against Sora and this time defeats him. However, immediately afterwards, Yuri fell into deep sleep like Yugo does until he woke up after the Adam Factor inside Yuya restored his memories. Yuri uses a Predator Plants Deck that focuses on Fusion Summon with his ace monster being Starving Venemy Dragon which he gave to Yuya.
Yugo / Yugo Sakaki (ユーゴ / 榊 遊吾, Yūgo / Sakaki Yūgo)
Pretending to be one of Yuya's alternate personalities, somewhat dim-witted with a short-temper yet kind-hearted, the prideful Yugo is a Turbo Duellist from future who uses Synchro Summon. Yugo is actually one Yuya's older brothers, who died together with Yuto and Yuri during G.O.D's rampage with his soul ending up in Yuya's body. Yugo, Yuto, and Yuri erased Yuya's memories involving them as they deemed the memories would saddened Yuya due to the fact that they were already dead. He uses the Solid Vision technology in Yuya's Duel Disk to materialize a Duel Runner. Yugo first makes his presence known following Yuya's duel against Sora, taking Yuya back to their base. Yugo also developed a rivalry with the Turbo Duellist Ren, unaware that Ren is his descendant. Following Yuya's duel against Reiji, expecting his host's power may keep him from helping in later battles, Yugo begins to train Yuya in mastering his Turbo Duelling skills. During his rematch against Ren, the Adam Factor inside Yuya dwindling Yugo's existence, forcing Yugo to leave Yuya to defeat Ren and has been unconscious since then until he woke up after the Adam Factor inside Yuya restored his memories. Yugo uses a Speedroid Deck that focuses on Synchro Summon and his ace monster is Clearwing Fast Dragon which he gave to Yuya.
Yuzu Hiiragi (柊 柚子, Hīragi Yuzu)
She is the daughter of the principal of Syu Zo Duel School, often carrying a paper fan that she usually uses on her father whenever he does something foolish. Wanting to keep the school open and resolve her father's financial struggles, becoming a stingy gold-digger as a result, Yuzu decided to track down Yuya as his infamy would attract much needed attention for Syu Zo Duel School. Yuzu finds Yuya and tricked him into signing a teaching contract, with Yuya reluctantly allowing her to become his manager and aide in his mission to find the G.O.D. card. But Yuzu gradually becomes concerned for Yuya's well being, with Yuya's brothers hinting that they and Yuya knew her in their future timeline. When Yuya leaves, he gives Yuzu his Odd-Eyes Phantom Dragon card before eventually crossing paths with a young Yusho. It is eventually revealed that Yuzu is actually Yusho's wife in the future, making her the mother of Yuya, Yuto, Yuri, and Yugo.

=== Leo Corporation ===
Reiji Akaba (赤馬 零児, Akaba Reiji)
He is the president of the Leo Corporation, originating from the same time as Yuya and his brothers. He was brought to the present by EVE's group months before Yuya arrived, using his knowledge to create the Leo Corporation. Reiji proceeds to set up a group of Duellists and other preparations to capture Yuya, whom he refers to as the "Destiny Factor" that will eventually choose to destroy the world. When he personally duels Yuya, Reiji reveals his intent to stop Yuya from obtaining the G.O.D. card along with blaming Yusho for causing G.O.D.'s rampage which killed his father. His hatred is so strong that he does not acknowledge Action Duels which Yusho created and refuses to listen to Yuya's attempt to explain his father's actions. Like Yuya, Reiji possesses a power called the Adam Factor which Ren said is necessary to awaken G.O.D. Reiji used that fact to call out Isaac to his personal space station, revealing to have used the duel to trace Isaac's communication to locate Eve's base so he can confront her. Once Eve is defeated, acquiring Adam's Adam Factor while meeting him, Reiji duels Yuya for the G.O.D card as he intends to keep his father's legacy alive. He initially uses a D/D Deck that focuses on Pendulum Summon, later changing to a Go-D/D Deck with Divine D/D/D Zero King Zero God Reiji as his ace monster.
Shingo Sawatari (沢渡 シンゴ, Sawatari Shingo)
He is one of Duellists in the special team in charge of capturing Yuya, cornering him before facing Yuto. He and Yuto Duelled, and even though he succeeded in driving Yuto to corner, he was immediately defeated by Yuya once he took over for Yuto. Sawatari uses a Monarch Deck.
Shun Kurosaki (黒咲隼, Kurosaki Shun)
He is one of the Duellists in the special team in charge of capturing Yuya, a battle-hardened and hardcore Duellist that Reiji recruited from an underground duelling tournament. Following Sawatari's defeat, expressing his disdain for duellists like Yuya who duel for fun, Shun challenges Yuya by taking Shuzo hostage when he assumed Yuzu to be Yuya's accomplice. But Shun is defeated by Yuya, having an apparent change of heart after the youth saved his life, though his thirst for duel still remains. Shun uses a Raidraptors Deck that focuses on Xyz Summon with Blade Burner Falcon as his ace monster.
Sora Shiunin (紫雲院 素良, Shiun'in Sora)
First appearing as one of the Duellists that Leo Corp hired to capture Yuya, Sora is a sadistic duellist who wins by any means. Unlike the other hired Duellist, Sora is the only one to be suspicious of Reiji's true agenda before Reiji convinced him to duel Yuya for answers. Leaking false information about G.O.D., Sora lures Yuya to Duel laboratory where he tripled the damage setting of the Solid Vision field, pretending to be forced into duelling by claiming that Reiji is holding his ailing sister, Miu, hostage. But Yuri exposes Sora's true personality and Yuya wins in a manner of dwindling his Life Points without harming him. Sora, feeling insulted, blows up the Solid Vision field in retaliation and is spirited off by Ren. It's revealed afterwards that Sora is actually a sleeper agent of EVE sent to infiltrate the Leo Corporation, his memory later restored. Sora later has a rematch with Yuya when he and the others infiltrate EVE's base, revealing his pact with the G.O.D card allowed him live his life by Miu's side in an endless loop. But with the knowledge that he could not avert Miu's demise in any way, Sora left the time loop so he can use the restored G.O.D's full power to a personal reality where he can be with Miu without her dying. But Yuri, while defeating the boy, reveals to Sora that he is in a clinging self-denial since he left Miu out of guilt as he couldn't bear to see her die endlessly, thus ending his contract with G.O.D. This motivates Sora to become someone his sister would be proud of, remaining in the present with Yuzu, Shingo, and Shun. Sora uses a Fluffal/Edge Imp/Frightfur Deck that focuses on Fusion Summon and Pendulum Summon, and his ace monsters are Frightfur Bear and Frightfur Daredevil.

=== Antagonists ===
Genesis Omega Dragon (ジェネシス・オメガ・ドラゴン, Jeneshisu Omega Doragon)
Also known as the G.O.D. (G.O.D. (ゴッド）, Goddo) card, it is a sentient Pendulum-type Duel Monster that manipulates others by granting them their desires which would ultimately doom whatever world the monster comes upon. Adam used G.O.D.'s ability to weakened by transferring most of its power into three humans, forcing the Duel Monster to use EVE as its pawn to orchestrate Yuya and Reiji traveling back into the past to acquire the Adam Factors from them. When absorbing EVE, G.O.D. attempted to talk Yuya into forfeiting with promise of his brothers given life as they are reunited with their father, only for Yuya to resist as he uses God-Eyes Phantom Dragon to defeat G.O.D. and then rips it into pieces after dueling Reiji for ownership.
EVE (EVE (イヴ), Ivu)
EVE is a woman who originates from another moment in time where she aided her lover Adam in developing Solid Vision for the benefit of humanity. But when Adam's being got scattered across time, only the G.O.D. card remained which she took into her possession while seeking out Yuya and Reiji to extract the scattered essence of Adam within them to restore her love. Using Duel Academy's duel disks to card people, she takes their energy hoping to revive Adam. However, Ren believing that the G.O.D. card is influencing her to regain its power, EVE is also revealed to suffer an illness which Isaac seeks to cure that seems to be connected with G.O.D as EVE stated that her life is tied with the card. After her followers have been defeated, EVE duels Yuya and his brothers before being absorbed by G.O.D. after she pendulum summoned it. EVE is eventually defeated, and following this, she's reunited with Adam whose essences returned and disappeared together with him. EVE uses a Mystic Factor Deck that focuses on all four Summoning types, with Genesis Omega Dragon as her ace. Her deck also includes monsters referencing past Yu-Gi-Oh anime main antagonist aces.
Ren (蓮, Ren)
Ren is a masked young man who originated from a distant future where Yugo came to be known as a legendary dueling genius. While Ren aspired to become a legend in his right, he died during a duel by accident which was reversed by Genesis Omega Dragon. Meeting EVE soon after, allowed to live out the rest of his life to old age, Ren joined EVE's cause to repay his debt to her and G.O.D with his youth restored. First seen observing Yuya's battle with Sora, saving the latter, Ren infiltrated Yuya's mind to get access into his memories. Ren is then confronted by Yugo, displaying his in-depth knowledge of him and Yuya before taking his leave once defeated in a Turbo Duel. Later facing Yugo and then Yuya, Ren reveals his origins before unmasking himself to reveal himself as Yugo's descendant. Once defeated, Ren reveals to Yuya why he and Reiji are being targeted and then fell into coma as a consequence of his time traveling. But upon EVE's defeat, revealed to have been secretly opposing G.O.D., Ren is revitalized as he witnesses Yuya's duel with Reiji before departing with the two to confront G.O.D's creator. Using a White Deck, Ren is a Turbo Duelist who specializes in Synchro Summon like Yugo with his ace monster being White Aura Biphamet.
Isaac (アイザック, Aizakku)
A scientist and subordinate of EVE, Isaac originated from the same time as her and Adam whom he idolized and became their assistant. But Isaac harbours unrequited feelings for EVE which motivated him not to stop Adam from sacrificing himself as he wanted EVE to return his feelings. Stricken by guilt, Isaac does his best to help EVE in restoring Adam while treating the illness she is suffering from. He first appears tending to Sora's injuries following his Duel against Yuya and informs the boy of what happened while Sora was acting as a sleeper agent. Isaac later confronts Reiji in his space station, revealing Adam's story and then duels him, but he is defeated while learning Reiji was trying to locate their base. He attempted to hinder Reiji by destroying his station, but Reiji already successfully pinpoint their hideout. He got sucked into deep space after his defeat, but Sora managed to transport him back at the last minute and fell into coma. Upon EVE's defeat, Isaac is revitalized as he witnesses Yuya's duel with Reiji before accompanying the two duelists to confront G.O.D's creator. Isaac uses a Mirror Imagine deck that uses Pendulum Summons.

=== Others ===
Yusho Sakaki (榊 遊勝, Sakaki Yūsho)
He is Yuya, Yuto, Yugo, and Yuri's father and co-creator of the Solid Vision technology along with Action Duels and Pendulum Summoning, though later revealed to have been influenced by the G.O.D. card. Yusho retired from science and became a Duelltainer to establish a trend of peaceful and fun duels before his work was used by the militant purposes. When Leo became obsessed studying G.O.D and realized how the card had taken over his friend, Yusho stole the card in failed attempt to stop the dragon's rampage. Moments before their time was destroyed, having originally intended to send all four of his sons back in time before the capsules meant for Yuto, Yugo and Yuri were destroyed, Yusho used some of G.O.D.'s power to cause a temporal incident known as World Illusion so he can send Yuya two decades into the past with the task to find G.O.D.'s creator.
Leo Akaba (赤馬 零王, Akaba Reo)
He is Rei's father and co-creator of the Solid Vision technology, helping his lab partner Yusho develop Action Duels and Pendulum Summoning. However, G.O.D began influencing Leo, making him obsessed of researching the G.O.D card, which forced Yusho to steal the card in a failed attempt to keep it from awakening. Before his death, Leo placed Reiji in an emergency bunker to save his life and gave him the task to stop Yuya from getting G.O.D.
Shuzo Hiiragi (柊 修造, Hīragi Shūzō)
He is Yuzu's father and the principal of Syu Zo Duel School that is on the verge of bankruptcy since no one apply to his school. He is later confronted by Shun after mistaking Yuzu as Yuya's accomplice, easily defeated and taken hostage by Shun to lure out Yuya. After Yuya rescued him, Shuzo is last seen unable to stop Yuzu from moving in with the youth.
Nico Smiley (ニコ・スマイリー, Niko Sumairī)
A weaselly presenter in underground Duels who played a role in arranging Shun's recruitment by Reiji.
Miu Shiun'in (紫雲院 美宇, Shiun'in Miu)
She is Sora's younger sister, who is hospitalized with a mysterious illness that eventually killed her. While the G.O.D. card allowed Sora to see his sister again in a time-loop, he could not save her no matter what he does. Saving Miu's life became Sora's motivation of aiding Eve in the hopes of creating a new world where he and his sister can be together without fear of death. Even when Sora briefly had his memory altered to infiltrate Leo Corp, traces of Miu remained in his mind as Sora once used her photo a part of a scheme to make Yuya let his guard down, claiming her to be held hostage by Reiji before Yuri soon exposed the boy's lie.
Adam (アダム, Adamu)
He was EVE'S lover who is said to live in the distant future. According to Ren and Isaac, Adam was a scientist whose intent to develop Solid Vision for the good of humanity allowed him to make first contact with G.O.D. and learned of its power to render its user omnipresent across the timeline and create alternate realities. But the experiment resulted with Adam sacrificing himself to stop a potential disaster, realizing the threat that G.O.D. poses to the world as sealed the entity's power within himself while his being is scattered across time. Render semi-corporeal, Adam used his newfound existence to find ideal duelists across time who can destroy G.O.D before infusing Yuya and Reiji with the two thirds of G.O.D.'s power known as the Adam Factor. EVE believes she can restore Adam by reuniting the two Adam Factors once extracted from their hosts, though Ren assumes that the G.O.D. card is using her to regain its power. When Yuya and the others infiltrate EVE's hideout, Adam reveals himself to Reiji and explains how he gave him and Yuya the Adam Factor in hopes that they can stop G.O.D. After giving Reiji his remaining power, Adam later retrieves EVE following her defeat at Yuya's hands.

== Reception ==
The manga received lukewarm reviews. Amy McNulty from Anime News Network gave the first volume rating of 1.5, praising Yuzu's character her interaction with Yuya. She also commented that "the highlight of the volume is easily the detailed monsters the Duellists summon during their Duels, which range from adorable to menacing, popping out from the page in oftentimes full-page spreads". However, she criticized the overuse of screen tones as "it results in a patchwork look that draws the eye too much to the tones when they should fade into the background more naturally" and the limited scope of audience, citing it will satisfy long-time fans and younger readers who find thrills in the escalation of projected card battles, but it's unlikely to bring any new older readers into the fold.

Nik Freeman from the same site criticized the changes in the backgrounds of several characters. He states their backgrounds are considerably less imaginative than their anime counterparts, particularly Yuya and Yuto sharing one body from the very beginning, Shun Kurosaki has been changed from "a vengeful former freedom fighter to a considerably more basic pseudo-masochistic thrill-seeker", and he found Yuzu's change to be the most disappointing who is now a "completely one-note character". However, he praised the portrayal of the Action Duels, finding it a bit easier to get into the Arc-V manga than other adaptations of the franchise for new readers.

Rebecca Silverman from the same site gave the volume more positive review, rating it 2.5. She praised the introduction of the volume with "an air of sci fi-flavoured mystery into the otherwise fairly standard story". However, she noted that the artwork feels like a few too many panels crammed on each page, and almost all of them showing action of some kind. The monsters and hairstyles of the characters are creative, as are the page layouts, but finds it can be a little overwhelming at times.
