= Yu-Gi-Oh! Arc-V =

Japanese anime series

- 遊☆戯☆王ARC-V
- Genre: Adventure, fantasy
- Based on: Yu-Gi-Oh! by Kazuki Takahashi and Studio Dice
- Developed by: Tsutomu Kamishiro
- Directed by: Katsumi Ono
- Music by: Kōtarō Nakagawa
- Country of origin: Japan
- Original language: Japanese
- No. of episodes: 148 (list of episodes)

Production
- Producers: Ryō Sasaki (TV Tokyo); Susumu Matsuyama (TV Tokyo); Kosuke Kazino (TV Tokyo); Akiko Hirayama
- Animator: Gallop
- Production companies: TV Tokyo; NAS

Original release
- Network: TXN (TV Tokyo)
- Release: April 6, 2014 – March 26, 2017

Related
- Manga

Yu-Gi-Oh! Arc-V: Saikyō Duelist Yuya
- Written by: Akihiro Tomonaga
- Published by: Shueisha
- Magazine: Saikyō Jump
- Original run: April 3, 2015 – August 6, 2018
- Volumes: 2
- Manga
- Yu-Gi-Oh! Arc-V
- Other series
- List of all Yu-Gi-Oh! series; Yu-Gi-Oh! R
- Other media
- Video games; Trading card game

Yu-Gi-Oh! Arc-V (遊☆戯☆王ARC-V, Yū Gi Ō Āku Faibu; "Arc Five"), stylized as Yu-Gi-Oh! ARC-V, is a Japanese anime series produced by TV Tokyo and NAS and animated by Gallop. It is the fourth spin-off anime series in the Yu-Gi-Oh! franchise following Yu-Gi-Oh! Zexal. The series aired in Japan on TV Tokyo from April 6, 2014, to March 26, 2017. The series is held by NAS within Japan, while it is licensed outside Japan by Konami Cross Media NY and launched internationally in 2015.

A manga adaptation by Naohito Miyoshi began serialization in Shueisha's V Jump magazine in August 2015.

The series was succeeded by Yu-Gi-Oh! VRAINS, which premiered in Japan on May 10, 2017.

== Plot ==
In Paradise City's You Show Duel School, second-year middle school student Yuya Sakaki aspires to become a professional Dueltainer, believing that Dueling is for fun and should be enjoyed just like his father, who disappeared. Yuya awakens a new power called Pendulum Summoning, which attracts the attention of the Leo Corporation's president, Declan Akaba. Yuya later meets three Duelists who greatly resemble him: the collected Xyz duelist "Yuto" from the Xyz dimension, whom he unknowingly absorbed during the Duel between Yuto and Yugo. The overconfident Synchro duelist "Yugo" from the Synchro dimension, who has a similar background with Yusei in Yu-Gi-Oh! 5Ds (and uses a dragon that resembles Yusei's Stardust Dragon). And the sadistic Fusion duelist "Yuri" from the Fusion dimension, who works for the Professor in Duel Academy, turning people into cards.

These look-alikes originate from other dimensions besides Yuya's Standard Dimension, and he and his friends become involved in an interdimensional conflict against the Fusion Dimension's Duel Academy, which Yuri attends. Duel Academy is led by Declan's estranged father Leo, who seeks to unite the four dimensions. Declan forms a group of elite duelists called the Lancers, whose members include Yuya, Moonshadow, and Shay, to stop his father. They increase their numbers while traveling to the Synchro and Xyz Dimensions to find Yuya's friend Zuzu Boyle, and are joined by the Fusion Dimension's Celina, who resembles Zuzu.

Aware of the four dimensions, the Lancers go to the Synchro dimension where Yugo hails from, as Yugo is convinced that Zuzu is his abducted childhood friend Rin. A threat arises from the head of sector security in the Synchro dimension, who is mind controlling all of sector security. Yuya defeats Jack and they are able to stop it, but they end up in the Xyz dimension. There, Yuya meets a student of Duel Academy who dueled his father but failed to turn him into a card, and becomes more convinced that his father is alive.

Gradually recognizing a dark presence that has been swelling inside him since absorbing Yuto, Yuya learns that he has a strong psychic connection to him, Yugo, and Yuri that occurs whenever their summoned dragons are calling one another. Yuya and his friends also realize that Leo seeks to capture Zuzu and Celina, the professor already having Rin and the Xyz Dimension's Lulu Obsidian in his custody. Once in the Fusion Dimension to save Celina, Zuzu is captured as well and Yuya is reunited with his father as the Lancers infiltrate Duel Academy to save the girls. When they confront Leo, he reveals that the four dimensions used to be one world until the duelist Zarc attempted to destroy everything. The Professor intended to stop Zarc with the special En Cards he created, but his daughter, Ray, stole the cards and sacrificed herself to defeat Zarc. The effect of the Four En cards split Zarc and Ray and split the original dimension into four worlds.

The Professor reveals that Zarc is the darkness within Yuya and his counterparts, who are themselves remnants of Zarc's scattered essence, which has been compelling them to absorb each other so Zarc can be reconstituted and exact his revenge. Only Ray, who has been reincarnated as Zuzu and her counterparts, had been subconsciously preventing Zarc's attempts to reawaken prior to The Professor having the girls abducted. The Professor intends to merge them back into his daughter and reunite the four dimensions as the Original Dimension using his Arc-V Reactor. However, as the reactor is unable to fully restore Ray's physical form as The Professor planned due to a lack of life energy, he decides to send Duel Academy to the three dimensions to turn people into cards and power up the Arc-V Reactor. Yuri duels Yugo and absorbs him after winning, but Zarc capitalizes on the turn of events by taking over Yuya's body and having him absorb the willing Yuri to complete his resurrection. Yuya's friends challenge Zarc in a series of two-on-one duels to stop him while reaching out to Yuya. With Ray possessing Declan's younger sibling, Riley, to fight Zarc, Yuya manages to regain control and help Ray defeat Zarc with the En Cards, causing the dimensions to be split once more.

Upon awakening in the Standard Dimension, which has been reborn as the Pendulum Dimension, Yuya does not remember his experiences across the dimensions or Zuzu until Declan restores everyone's memories with a reenactment of the Arc League Championship. Declan reveals that Riley used a moment in the dimensional divide to transfer Zarc's essence from Yuya into herself to prevent him from being scattered across the dimensions again. This caused Riley to turn into a catatonic infant as a result, and Declan fears that Zarc may eventually take over Riley's body and resume his rampage. Yuya is told that he, being Zarc's essence, is the only one who can stop Zarc for good by using his Dueltaining skills to make Riley smile and pacify Zarc. Yuya proceeds to travel to other dimensions and defeat the other Lancers, with Riley watching the footage. Along the way, Yuya finds Zuzu and her counterparts dormant inside the Arc-V Reactor and tames the Four Dragons with help from his counterparts. After being promoted to Senior class, Yuya convinces Declan to let him take the professional duelist test, with Declan as his opponent. Learning who Zarc was in his life, Yuya and his counterparts defeat Leo and pacify Zarc. This awakens Ray, who appears in the Pendulum Dimension and is revived as Zuzu, with her and Yuya's counterparts existing inside them as part of them. They are reunited at last, and the four dimensions are connected. With help from his counterparts, Yuya manages to make Riley smile.

== Setting ==
=== Standard Dimension ===
The Standard Dimension, later reborn as the Pendulum Dimension, is the dimension where Paradise City is located. It is the main setting of the first season. Originally only having users of Tribute Summoning, the Standard Dimension now contains all three summoning methods of Fusion, Synchro, and Xyz, introduced to it by Leo Akaba and his Leo Corporation. This dimension is known for its unique Action Dueling, which uses the Real Solid Vision System to give mass to its holograms and allow Duelists to interact with their monsters and the artificially created environment. The Real Solid Vision System is an evolved form of the original Solid Vision System, which only had intangible holograms. Leo Akaba founded the Leo Institute for Duels (LID), where he trained the best duelist in Paradise City in the three kinds of summoning methods. Among this group was Silvio Sawatari, friend and rival of Yuya.

After the battle against Zarc, the Standard Dimension was reborn as the Pendulum Dimension, where everyone can now use Pendulum Summoning, in addition to all the other types.

It is the only dimension to not have versions of past Yu-Gi-Oh! characters. However, Yusho, Yuya's father, possesses a deck that heavily references Yugi Muto's Dark Magician based deck.

=== Synchro Dimension ===
The Synchro Dimension is a dimension where residents all use Synchro Summoning. It pays homage to Yu-Gi-Oh! 5D's. Its setting is New Domino City, also referred to as "the City", which serves as the setting of the second season. New Domino City thrives on a free competition society consisting of two classes. The elite class of 1%, the Topsiders, are the upper class society living in wealth, while the poor Commons are the lower class 99% of society living in poverty under the Topsiders' area. Discrimination against Commons is high, and they are treated as tools for allowing the Tops to live in wealth. In rebellion against their limited freedom, the Commons started to duel while riding Duel Runners, which are motorcycles combined with Duel Disks. These duels later became known as Turbo Duels. New Domino City is ruled by the High Council, which upholds Martial Law, and Sector Security, who act as police for the Topsiders. To maintain the peace of the city, the High Council holds the yearly Friendship Cup, where Duelists from both the Topsiders and Commons can fairly duel each other on Duel Runners. However, those who lose are sent to an underground garbage refinery with little to no chance of returning to the surface. After Yuya's duel against Jack in the Friendship Cup final match, the High Council retired and the social class system was abolished. Dimensional counterparts of Jack Atlas, Crow Hogan, and Lazar, characters from the 5D's series, also appear.

Unlike Yu-Gi-Oh! 5D's, the series does not use the turbo duel system that included special speed spells and speed counters. Arc V still features duel runners, known as D-Wheel's in the original version. However, the system allows users to use all types of magic and trap cards, like in a regular duel.

=== Xyz Dimension ===
The Xyz Dimension is a dimension where residents all use Xyz Summoning. It pays homage to Yu-Gi-Oh! Zexal. Its setting is Heartland City, which serves as the setting of the first half of the third season. Heartland City was reduced to ruins from the invasion by the Fusion Dimension's Duel Academy, with the remaining survivors forming a Resistance group based in the ruined Heartland City. Before the invasion, there were two sections of the Heartland Duel School: Spade School and Clover School, which became the main forces for the Resistance group. The Spade Branch was wiped out in a later assault. A dimensional counterpart of Kite Tenjo, one of the main characters of Yu-Gi-Oh! Zexal, also appears.

In Arc-V's plot, Heartland City was invaded by the Fusion Dimension and its inhabitants captured in cards, except for a small number of people, including the Resistance group led by Kite.

=== Fusion Dimension ===
The Fusion Dimension is a dimension where residents all use Fusion Summoning. It pays homage to Yu-Gi-Oh! GX. It serves as the setting of the second half of the third season. When Leo comes to the Fusion Dimension upon regaining his memories, he establishes the militant-based Duel Academy and gathers many strong Duelists from across the dimension to achieve his goal of hunting down Ray's incarnations. The students of Duel Academy are mostly children who were taken from other families once of age. They are forced to remain on the campus to be trained as child soldiers until the Arc-Area Project is completed, with those who escape being branded as traitors and turned into cards as punishment. Dimensional counterparts of Alexis Rhodes and Aster Phoenix, two of the main characters from GX, also appear.

=== Original Dimension ===
The Original Dimension, also known as the United World, was a futuristic utopia which was the original form of the Four Dimensions and where the Real Solid Vision System truly originated. When Zarc began his rampage, Ray used the Four Nature Cards her father developed to splinter the reality, dividing Zarc's being and rendering him harmless at the cost of having herself splintered in the process. Leo's goal is to restore the Original Dimension as a new dimension, which he calls ARC-V, by fusing the four dimensions, as well as merging Zuzu and her counterparts with the ARC-V reactor he had created, which is powered by the life energies of the people who were turned into cards, so his daughter Ray can be reborn. After Ray uses the Nature Cards to split the world back into the four dimensions, Declan reveals that the dimensions are linked by the active remains of ARC-V serving as wormholes, with Ray's essence still in the reactor core within the Fusion Dimension, until Yuya pacifies Zarc.

== Media ==
=== Anime ===
Yu-Gi-Oh! Arc V was first announced in December 2013 in Shueisha's Weekly Shonen Jump magazine. The anime series aired on TV Tokyo between April 6, 2014, and March 26, 2017, which replaced Yu-Gi-Oh! Zexal in its initial time slot. 4K Media Inc. acquired the series outside of Japan and planned to release the series internationally in 2015 with an edited English language dub that is strictly aimed at elementary school aged students between 6 and 10 years in all countries that air the show from 4K Media. The 4K version had its debut on March 12, 2015, in Germany, Austria and Switzerland as part of the Yep! anime/cartoon block on ProSieben Maxx. In North America, a localized English adaptation began airing on Canada's Teletoon on July 24, 2015, and Nickelodeon and Nicktoons in the United States on September 19, 2015, and February 21, 2016, respectively.

=== Manga ===
A manga one-shot illustrated by Naohito Miyoshi was published in the July 2014 issue of Shueisha's V Jump magazine released on May 21, 2014. An English version was released on May 26, 2014, on Weekly Shonen Jump. A full adaptation by Miyoshi began serialization in V Jump on August 21, 2015. It began publication in English by Viz Media in its digital Shonen Jump on August 24, 2015. A spin-off manga by Akihiro Tomonaga titled Yu-Gi-Oh! Arc-V: Saikyō Duelist Yuya!! (遊☆戯☆王ARC－V 最強デュエリスト遊矢!!; lit. "Yu-Gi-Oh! Arc-V: Yuya the Greatest Duelist!!) was serialized in Saikyō Jump between April 3, 2015, and August 3, 2017, and was collected in two volumes.

=== Music ===
There are four official soundtracks released by Marvelous Entertainment.

- The first, Yu-Gi-Oh! Arc-V Sound Duel 1 was released on August 20, 2014.
- The second, Yu-Gi-Oh! Arc-V Sound Duel 2 was released on January 20, 2015.
- The third, Yu-Gi-Oh! Arc-V Sound Duel 3 was released on June 24, 2015.
- The fourth and final, Yu-Gi-Oh! Arc-V Sound Duel 4 was released on March 28, 2018.

Opening themes

- "Believe✕Believe" by Bullet Train (超特急) (Eps. 1-30)
- "Burn!" by Bullet Train (超特急) (Eps. 31–49)
- "UNLEASH" (ハナテ, HANATE) by Gekidan Niagara (劇団ナイアガラ) (Eps. 50–75)
- "Trump Card" (切り札, Kirifuda) by Cinema Staff (Eps. 76–98)
- "LIGHT OF HOPE" (キボウノヒカリ, KIBOU NO HIKARI) by Unknown Number!!! (Eps. 99–124)
- "Pendulum Beat!" by SUPER★DRAGON (Eps. 125–147)

Ending themes

- "One Step" by P★Cute (Eps. 1-30)
- "Future fighter!" by Yuya Sakaki (CV:Kenshō Ono) and Reiji Akaba (CV:Yoshimasa Hosoya) (Eps. 31–49)
- "ARC of Smile!" by BOYS AND MEN (Eps. 50–75)
- "Speaking" by Mrs. GREEN APPLE (Eps. 76–98)
- "Vision" (ビジョン, Bijon) by Kuso linkai (空想委員会) (Eps. 99–124)
- "Dashing Pendulum" (疾走ペンデュラム, Shissou Pendyuramu) by M!LK (Eps. 125–147)

English opening theme Ending theme

- "Can you Feel the Power" by Max Surla, Ali Theodore, Sarai Howard, Jordan Yaeger and Sergio Cabral (Eps. 1–148)

=== Trading Card Game ===
Yu-Gi-Oh! Arc-V added new game elements to the Yu-Gi-Oh! Trading Card Game. Following the release of Starter Deck 2014, Master Rule 3 came into effect, and introduced Pendulum Monsters to the trading card game. A hybrid of Monster and Spell, they can either be summoned conventionally, or "activated" in the newly added Pendulum Zones as Spell Cards, with their own separate effect. On the Pendulum Scale, the cards have a "Scale" a number that if there are two Pendulum Cards on both zones, the player can perform a new type of summon. Known as Pendulum Summoning, one per turn, the player is allowed to simultaneously Special Summon an unlimited amount of monsters from their hand (or face-up from their Extra Deck) to the field provided their Levels are in between (and not equal to) the Scales of the cards on the Pendulum Zone. With the release of the New Master Rules that were rolled out with the premiere of Yu-Gi-Oh! VRAINS, Pendulum Monsters from the Extra Deck can now only be summoned into either the Extra Monster Zone or under a Link Arrow. If a Pendulum Monster is destroyed or tributed while on the field, they do not go to the graveyard and instead go face-up into the Extra Deck, where the player can re-Pendulum Summon them at their next opportunity. If Pendulum Monsters are used as Xyz Material for an Xyz monster and they are removed via an Xyz Monster's effect, they go into the graveyard.

As for competitive rules, the player that goes first can no longer draw on their first Draw Phase. Both players can now control a Field Spell simultaneously and apply both Field Spell rules to the game.

=== Video game ===
A video game based on the series, Yu-Gi-Oh! Arc-V Tag Force Special was released in Japan on January 22, 2015. The game was released for the PSP as a downloadable title only.

== Reception ==
The series ranked 64th in the Tokyo Anime Award Festival in Top 90 TV Anime 2016 category with 729 votes and ranked 250 in NHK Best 400 Anime of All Times to air on its channel. However, the series was received poorly on Japanese streaming site Niconico, taking all spots in the Top 10 Worst Rated Episodes.
