= List of Yu-Gi-Oh! GX chapters =

First volume cover

This is a list of chapters of Yu-Gi-Oh! GX, written by Naoyuki Kageyama and one of the manga spin-off Yu-Gi-Oh! titles published by Shueisha and serialized by V-Jump. It is based on the anime series of the same title. It began serialization in V-Jump on December 17, 2005, while the first volume was released on November 2, 2006. This series was licensed in North America by Viz Media, with Yu-Gi-Oh! GX having started publication in Shonen Jump in December 2006 and with the first English volume released on November 6, 2007.

== Chapter list ==
No.	Title	Original release date	English release date
1	A New Hero Appears!! / A New Hero!! Nyū Hīrō Tōjō!! (新(ニュー)HERO(ヒーロー)登(とう)場(じょう)！！)	November 2, 2006; 4-08-874286-9	November 6, 2007; 1-4215-1378-1
Chapter 1: "A New Hero Appears!!" (新(ニュー)HERO(ヒーロー)登(とう)場(じょう)！！, Nyū Hīrō Tōjō!!) / "A New Hero!!"i; Chapter 2: "The Name is Manjome!!" (その名は万丈目！！, Sono Na wa Manjōme!!) / "Princeton!!"; Chapter 3: "The Legendary Dragon" (伝説のドラゴン, Densetsu no Doragon); Chapter 4: "A Prodigy Duelist!!" (秀才デュエリスト！！, Shūsai Dyuerisuto!!) / "Bastion The Analyst!!"; Chapter 5: "Earth Gravity" (アース・グラビティ, Āsu Gurabiti) / "Terra Firma Gravity"; Chapter 6: "Miss Duel Academia" (ミス・デュエルアカデミア, Misu Dyueru Akademia) / "Miss Duel Academy"; Chapter 7: "A True Duelist!!" (真のデュエリスト！！, Shin no Dyuerisuto!!) / "The Real Duelist!!"; Chapter 8: "Two Big Brothers!!" (2人のアニキ！！, Futari No Aniki!!); Chapter 9: "Burning Friendship!!" (熱き友情！！, Atsuki Yūjō!!) / "Burning Friends!!"
2	A Meeting with Destiny!! Unmei no Deai!! (運命の出会い！！)	August 3, 2007; 978-4-08-874410-0	November 4, 2008; 1-4215-3007-4
Chapter 10: "A Meeting with Destiny!!" (運命の出会い！！, Unmei no Deai!!); Chapter 11: "Deck of Fate!!" (運命のデッキ！！, Unmei no Dekki!!); Chapter 12: "Duelist Sense!!" (デュエリストセンス！！, Dyuerisuto Sensu!!) / Duelist Instinct!!; Chapter 13: "Hero Showdown, Conclusion?!" (HERO対決、決着！？, Hīrō Taiketsu, Ketchaku!?) / "Showdown!! Who Will Win?"; Chapter 14: "The Deck Passed!!" (受け継がれるデッキ！！, Uketsugareru Dekki!!); Chapter 15: "Separation...and Determination!!" (別れ……そして決意！！, Wakare......Soshite Ketsui!!); Chapter 16: "A New Enemy!?" (新たなる敵！？, Arata Naru Teki!?) / "A New Enemy?!"; Chapter 17: "Misawa VS Manjome!!" (三沢VS万丈目！！, Misawa bāsasu Manjōme!!) / "Bastion vs. Chazz"; Chapter 18: "Mysterious Monster!!" (謎のモンスター！！, Nazo no Monsutā!!)
3	End of the preliminary rounds!! / The First Round Ends!! Yosen Shūryō!! (予選終了！！)	May 2, 2008; 978-4-08-874519-0	June 2, 2009; 1-4215-2677-8
Chapter 19: "The Preliminary Rounds End!!" (予選終了！！, Yosen Shūryō!!) / "The First Round Ends!!"; Chapter 20: "Tournament Finals Start!!" (決勝トーナメント開始！！, Kesshō Tōnamento Kaishi!!) / "Let the Tournament Begin!!"; Chapter 21: "Enemies on the Move!!" (動き出した敵！！, Ugokidashita Teki!!); Chapter 22: "Shadow Game...!!" (闇のゲーム…！！, Yami no Gēmu...!!); Chapter 23: "Conclusion!!......And Then!?" (決着！！……そして！？, Ketchaku!! ......Soshite!?) / "Conclusion!!...But Then What?!"; Chapter 24: "Asuka VS Rabb!!" (明日香VSラブ！！, Asuka bāsasu Rabu!!) / "Alexis vs. David!!"; Chapter 25: "Manjome VS Sho!!" (万丈目VS翔！！, Manjōme bāsasu Shō!!) / "Chazz vs. Syrus!!"; Chapter 26: "Brother's Bond!!" (兄弟の絆！！, Kyōdai no Kizuna!!)
4	Semifinals, Start!! / The Semifinals Begin!! Junkesshō, Kaishi!! (準決勝、開始！！)	November 4, 2008; 978-4-08-874587-9	January 5, 2010; 1-4215-3173-9
Chapter 27: "Semifinals, Start!!" (準決勝、開始！！, Junkesshō, Kaishi!!) / "The Semifinals Begin!!"; Chapter 28: "Fusion Summon!!" (融合召喚！！, Yūgō Shōkan!!); Chapter 29: "Shadow Duel!!" (闇(やみ)の決闘(デュエル)！！, Yami no Dyueru!!) / "Shadow Game!!"; Chapter 30: "Light VS Darkness" (光VS闇！！, Hikari bāsasu Yami!!) / "Light vs. Dark!!"; Chapter 31: "Darkness on The Move!!" (動きだした闇！！, Ugokidashita Yami!!); Chapter 32: "Judai VS Manjome!!" (十代VS万丈目！！, Jūdai bāsasu Manjōme!!) / "Jaden VS Chazz"
5	The Greatest Hero!! Saikyō no Hīrō!! (最強のHERO！！)	May 1, 2009; 978-4-08-874691-3	October 5, 2010; 1-4215-3472-X
Chapter 33: "Ultimate Hero!!" (最強のHERO！！, Saikyō no Hīrō!!); Chapter 34: "Conclusion...!!" (決着…！！, Ketchaku...!!) / "The Final Round...!!"; Chapter 35: "Conclusion! And...!? (決着！ そして…！？, Ketchaku! Soshite...!?) / "The Winner! What's Next...?!"; Chapter 36: "Angel of Darkness!!" (闇の天使！！, Yami no Tenshi!!); Chapter 37: "Shadow Duel, Conclusion!!" (闇(やみ)の決闘(デュエル)、決(けっ)着(ちゃく)！！, Yami no Dyueru, Ketchaku!!) / "The Shadow Game Ends!!"; Chapter 38: "Final Match, Start!!" (決勝戦、開始！！, Kesshō Sen, Kaishi!!) / "The Final Duel Begins!!"
6	Kaiser Ryo!! / Kaiser!! Kaizā Ryō!! (カイザー亮！！)	November 4, 2009; 978-4-08-874760-6	March 1, 2011; 978-1-4215-3782-5
Chapter 39: "Kaiser Ryo!!" (カイザー亮！！, Kaizā Ryō!!) / "Kaiser!!"; Chapter 40: "Mac's Past!!" (マックの過去！！, Makku no Kako!!) / "Mac's Story!!"; Chapter 41: "The Shadow Duel Speeds Up!!" (加(か)速(そく)する闇(やみ)の決闘(デュエル)！！, Kasoku Suru Yami no Dyueru!!) / "The Shadow Game Speeds Up!!"; Chapter 42: "Conclusion! And...!?" (決着！！ そして…！？, Ketchaku! Soshite...!?) / "The End of the Battle...?!"; Chapter 43: "A New Enemy...!?" (新たな敵…！？, Aratana Teki...!?) / "A New Enemy...?!"; Chapter 44: "King Fubuki!!" (キング・フブキ！！, Kingu Fubuki!!) / "King Rhodie!!"
7	The King's True Power!! Kingu no Jitsuryoku!! (キングの実力！！)	April 30, 2010; 978-4-08-870043-4	August 2, 2011; 978-1-4215-3925-6
Chapter 45: "The King's True Power!!" (キングの実力！！, Kingu no Jitsuryoku!!) / "King Atticus's True Power!!"; Chapter 46: "Tag Duel!!" (タッグ・デュエル！！, Taggu Dyueru!!); Chapter 47: "Birth of the Ultimate Tag!!" (最強タッグ誕生！！, Saikyō Taggu Tanjō!!); Chapter 48: "The Course of the Tag Battles!!" (タッグ戦の行方！！, Taggu Sen no Yukue!!) / "The Outcome of the Tag Duel!!"; Chapter 49: "Sho's Real Strength!!" (翔の実力！！, Shō no Jitsuryoku!!) / "Syrus's Real Strength!!"; Chapter 50: "Edo Phoenix!!" (エド・フェニックス！！, Edo Fenikkusu!!) / "Aster Phoenix!!"
8	Masked vs. Vision!! / Masked Hero vs. Vision Hero!! Masukudo bāsasu Vijon!! (変身(マスクド)VS(バーサス)幻影(ヴィジョン)！！)	October 4, 2010; 978-4-08-870124-0	January 3, 2012; 978-1-4215-3996-6
Chapter 51: "Masked vs. Vision!!" (変身(マスクド)VS(バーサス)幻影(ヴィジョン)！！, Masukudo bāsasu Vijon!!) / "Masked Hero vs. Vision Hero!!"; Chapter 52: "Edo Battles, Again...!!" (エド戦、再び。。。！！, Edo Sen, Futatabi...!!) / "Aster Duels Again...!"; Chapter 53: "Threat of the Vision Heroes!!" (V(ヴィジョン)・HERO(ヒーロー)の脅(きょう)威(い)！！, Vijon Hīrō no Kyōi!!) / "The Menace of the Vision Heroes!"; Chapter 54: "Looming... Darkness!!" (迫りくる。。。闇！！, Semari Kuru...Yami!!); Chapter 55: "Terror of the Sealed Beasts!!" (封印獣の恐怖！！, Fūin-jū no Kyōfu!!) / "The Terror of the Forbidden Beasts!!"; Chapter 56: "Mystery of the P Series!!" (P(プラネット)シリーズの謎(なぞ)！！, Puranetto Shirīzu no Nazo!!) / "The Mystery of the Planet Series!!"
9	At the End of the Fierce Battle... / Beyond the Struggle... Gekitō no Hate ni... (激闘の果てに…)	June 3, 2011; 1-4215-4212-9	August 7, 2012; 978-1-4215-4212-6
Chapter 57: "The Exchange Battle, Intensified!!" (交流戦、激化！！, Kōryūsen, Gekika!!) / "The Exchange Battle Heats Up!!"; Chapter 58: "Mackenzie's, Secret Maneuvers!!" (マッケンジー、暗躍！！, Makkenjī, An'yaku!!) / "Mackenzie's Stealth Maneuvers!!"; Chapter 59: "Judai, in a Big Pinch!!" (十代、大ピンチ！！, Jūdai, Dai Pinchi!!) / "Jaden in Crisis!!"; Chapter 60: "Revival, Near!!" (復活、迫る！！, Fukkatsu, Semaru!!) / "The Impending Resurrection!!"; Chapter 61: "The Final Showdown!!" (最終決戦！！, Saishū Kessen!!); Chapter 62: "The Strongest of the Planet Series!!" (最(さい)強(きょう)のP(プラネット)シリーズ！！, Saikyō no Puranetto Shirīzu!!) / The Ultimate Planet Series!!; Chapter 63: "The Threat of the Sun!!" (SUNの脅威！！, San no Kyōi!!); Chapter 64: "At The End of the Fierce Battle..." (激闘の果てに。。。, Gekitō no Hate ni...) / "Beyond The Struggle..."

== Chapter not in volume format ==
- "Special One-Shot" (特別読切, Tokubetsu Yomikiri)
