= Yu-Gi-Oh! OCG Structures =

Japanese manga series

遊☆戯☆王OCGストラクチャーズ (Yu-Gi-Oh! OCG Structures)
- Created by: Kazuki Takahashi
- Manga
- Written by: Satō Masashi
- Published by: Shueisha
- Magazine: V Jump
- Original run: June 21, 2019 – present
- Volumes: 12
- icon

Yu-Gi-Oh! OCG Structures is a Japanese manga spinoff of the Yu-Gi-Oh! Trading Card Game, featuring an original story where characters play the game akin to how it is played competitively. It is written by Satō Masashi, who had previously illustrated the Yu-Gi-Oh! 5D's manga.

== Plot ==
Yu-Gi-Oh! OCG Structures follows Shouma as he learns to play the Yu-Gi-Oh! Trading Card Game, known as the Official Card Game (OCG) in Japan. Through the course of the story, he uses a variety of different decks used by real players in the OCG. The decks used in the manga often correlate with new cards, including pre-constructed decks known as Structure Decks. Decks included in the series include Tenyi, Warriors, Malice, Dracotail, Fiendsmith, Yummy, Clown Crew, and Enneacraft.

== Production ==
Yu-Gi-Oh OCG Structures was announced on 6 June 2019 and began publication on 21 June. Prior to Yu-Gi-Oh! OCG Structures, Satō Masashi worked on the Yu-Gi-Oh! 5D's manga.

== Volumes ==
#	Release date
1	2 February 2020
2	4 September 2020
3	2 April 2021
4	4 November 2021
5	3 June 2022
6	4 January 2023
7	4 August 2023
8	4 March 2024
9	4 October 2024
10	2 May 2025
11	4 December 2025
12	3 July 2026
