= Naohito Miyoshi =

Japanese manga artist and character designer

- 三好直人 みよしなおひと
- Born: 1972 (age 53–54); Tokushima City, Tokushima Prefecture, Japan
- Known for: Manga
- Notable work: Yu-Gi-Oh! Zexal; Yu-Gi-Oh! Arc-V
- Awards: Tezuka Award honorary mention (1996)

Naohito Miyoshi (Japanese: 三好直人; born 1972) is a Japanese manga artist notable for his work on the Yu-Gi-Oh! Zexal and Yu-Gi-Oh! Arc-V manga. He also illustrates the Yu-Gi-Oh! OCG Stories manga. In 1996, he was an honorable mention for the Tezuka Award, for his work on Rune Quest.

== Career ==
Miyoshi began work as a mangaka in 1995 with the series Rune Quest. He was an honorary mention for the Tezuka Award for the series. In May 2003, he and Kaya Kizaki published the series Lake of Evil in Jump J-Books.

Beginning in December 2010, Miyoshi began illustrating the Yu-Gi-Oh! Zexal, written by Shin Yoshida, in V Jump. The Zexal manga ended in June 2015. In May 2014, he wrote and illustrated a one-shot for Yu-Gi-Oh! Arc-V, which was published in V Jump and Weekly Shōnen Jump. Between August 2015 and April 2019, he illustrated the Yu-Gi-Oh! Arc-V manga, written by Yoshida, which was serialized in V Jump. Beginning in 2022, he began illustrating the Yu-Gi-Oh! OCG Stories manga, once again written by Yoshida and serialized in V Jump.

Outside of manga, Miyoshi did the original character designs for the Yu-Gi-Oh! Arc-V anime.

== Works ==
=== Manga ===
- Rune Quest (1995)
- Lake of Evil (2003, with Kaya Kizaki)
- Yu-Gi-Oh! Zexal (2010, with Shin Yoshida)
- Yu-Gi-Oh! Arc-V one-shot
- Yu-Gi-Oh! Arc-V manga (2015, with Shin Yoshida)
- Yu-Gi-Oh! OCG Stories (2022, with Shin Yoshida)

=== Anime ===
- Yu-Gi-Oh! Arc-V (Character designs)
