= Yu-Gi-Oh! Bonds Beyond Time =

- English Theatrical release poster

Japanese name
- Kanji: 10thアニバーサリー 劇場版 遊☆戯☆王 〜超融合!時空を越えた絆〜
- Literal meaning: 10th Anniversary Yu-Gi-Oh! The Movie: Super Fusion! Bonds That Transcend Time
Transcriptions
- Revised Hepburn: Tensu Anibāsarī Gekijō-ban Yū Gi Ō Chō-Yūgō! Toki o Koeta Kizuna
- Directed by: Kenichi Takeshita
- Written by: Shin Yoshida
- Based on: Yu-Gi-Oh! by Kazuki Takahashi
- Starring: see below
- Cinematography: Hiroaki Edamitsu
- Music by: Yutaka Minobe; Wall 5 Project
- Production company: Gallop
- Distributed by: NAS
- Release date: January 23, 2010
- Running time: 50 minutes
- Country: Japan
- Language: Japanese
- Box office: $2 million

Yu-Gi-Oh! Bonds Beyond Time (Japanese: 10thアニバーサリー 劇場版 遊☆戯☆王 〜超融合!時空を越えた絆〜, Hepburn: Tensu Anibāsarī Gekijō-ban Yū Gi Ō Chō-Yūgō! Toki o Koeta Kizuna; lit. 10th Anniversary Yu-Gi-Oh! The Movie: Super Fusion! Bonds That Transcend Time) is a 2010 Japanese 3-D animated science fantasy action film based on the Yu-Gi-Oh! series. It was produced to celebrate the tenth anniversary of the NAS-produced series Yu-Gi-Oh! Duel Monsters, and features the main characters from the original Yu-Gi-Oh! anime series, Yu-Gi-Oh! GX and Yu-Gi-Oh! 5D's.

It was released in Japanese theaters on January 23, 2010. An English-language version of the film was produced by 4Kids Entertainment. The digital cinema developer and distributor Cinedigm screened the film in selected stereoscopic 3D theaters in the United States. In the United Kingdom, Manga Entertainment released the film in selected stereoscopic 3D cinemas, and followed this with a Blu-ray 3D and DVD release. The film was also released in the United States on Blu-ray and DVD.

The film earned over US$2 million in Japanese theaters, and also sold well on DVD, both in Japan and the United Kingdom. Film critics, however, criticized it for its limited scope of audience, claiming it was strictly marketed to children or fans of the series.

== Plot ==
As Yusei Fudo ponders the state of New Domino City, Jack Atlas and Crow Hogan cheer him up with the idea of riding on their Duel Runners. As they ride, a mysterious Turbo Duelist called Paradox challenges Yusei to a duel. Yusei summons his Stardust Dragon but Paradox seals it inside a card and disappears with it. They later discover an article that shows a mysterious battle in the past of Venice, Italy, that Yusei knows did not happen in history before. Compounding the situation, New Domino City is vanishing. As a result, the Crimson Dragon appears, giving Yusei's Duel Runner the ability to travel through time.

In the past, Jaden Yuki is attacked by evil versions of stolen monster cards in Venice, including Stardust Dragon. As Paradox prepares to kill Jaden, Yusei and the Crimson Dragon arrive and protect him. Afterward, Paradox flees to an earlier point in time. Jaden tells Yusei that he was pursuing Paradox, who stole his friends' cards. Yusei explains to Jaden the situation, and they decide to work together. Years earlier, Maximillion Pegasus is hosting a duel tournament in Domino City, which Yugi Muto is attending with his grandfather Solomon. Paradox uses his newly acquired monsters to attack the event, killing Pegasus, Yugi's grandfather, and several bystanders, but Yugi survives. Yusei and Jaden arrive, and the Crimson Dragon transports them and Yugi 30 minutes back in time before Paradox's attack, in order to stop him, as Pegasus' premature death would drastically alter the course of history. After learning about Paradox's actions, Yugi decides to join them, eventually letting his ancient alter ego Yami take over.

The trio then confronts Paradox, who reveals that he comes from a dystopian future far beyond Yusei's in which the world lies in ruins and nothingness, and claims that the only way to fix it is to eliminate Duel Monsters from history. However, the three heroes protest that by doing so, all the future events and people associated with Duel Monsters will be erased as well, and they challenge him to a duel. By combining the powers of their key monsters, Yugi, Jaden and Yusei defeat Paradox. After the duel, the three say goodbye to each other and promise to meet again someday. The latter two return to their respective time periods. New Domino City returns to normal, and Yusei returns to his own time, optimistic for what the future holds.

== Voice cast ==
Character	Japanese	English
Yusei Fudo	Yuya Miyashita	Greg Abbey
Jaden Yuki (Judai Yuki)	KENN	Matthew Charles Labyorteaux
Yugi Muto / Yami Yugi	Shunsuke Kazama	Dan Green
Paradox	Atsushi Tamura	Sean Schemmel
Jack Atlas	Takanori Hoshino	Ted Lewis
Crow Hogan	Shintaro Asanuma	Tom Wayland
Akiza Izinski (Aki Izayoi)	Ayumi Kinoshita	Erica Schroeder
Luna (Luca)	Yuka Terasaki	Eileen Stevens
Leo (Lua)	Ai Horanai	Eileen Stevens
Lyman Banner (Daitokuji)	Kappei Yamaguchi	Wayne Grayson
Yubel	Hiromi Tsuru	Eileen Stevens
Solomon Muto (Sugoroku Mutou)	Tadashi Miyazawa	Wayne Grayson
Maximillion Pegasus (Pegasus J. Crawford)	Jiro Jay Takasugi	Darren Dunstan

== Development and release ==
In July 2009, Yu-Gi-Oh! Bonds Beyond Time was first announced through Shueisha's magazines as a short film to be screened at the Jump Super Anime Tour to celebrate the tenth anniversary of the Yu-Gi-Oh! Duel Monsters anime series. It was revealed in the November issue of V-Jump magazine, that the animation would be a 3-D film. The film's imagery, however, was originally produced in 2D, and then was converted to 3D by the company Qtec. The 3D effect is emphasized in scenes where computer graphics are used, such as in the scene when the Duel Runners and the cards appear.

The film's official website released a 65-second trailer in September 2009, and a 139-second trailer in December. On January 21, 2010, before the film's release, a guidebook titled Yu-Gi-Oh! 10th Anniversary Animation Book was published under Shueisha's V Jump Books line. It contains an interview with Kazuki Takahashi—the author of the original Yu-Gi-Oh! manga—and information about the film's story and characters and was accompanied by a poster of the film. The film was released in Japan on January 23, 2010; those who attended the premiere received a promotional Malefic Red Eyes Black Dragon card. The film received an encore screening in Japan which was held on February 20, 2011, which included ten extra minutes in 2D. Bonds Beyond Time was released on DVD and Blu-ray Disc on June 15, 2011, by a partnership between King Records, Marvelous Entertainment, and Pony Canyon.

=== Staff ===
Members of the staff from the different Yu-Gi-Oh television series were involved in the film production. Shin Yoshida, the film's screenwriter, worked on Yu-Gi-Oh! Duel Monsters, Yu-Gi-Oh! GX, and Yu-Gi-Oh! 5D's. Masahiro Hikokubo did the composition of the duels for the film as he previously did for GX and 5D's. Kenichi Takeshita, the director of 5D's, went on to direct Bonds Beyond Time. The same production companies for all the anime, Studio Gallop and Nihon Ad Systems, were involved in the film. The film's music was composed by Yutaka Minobe and the Wall 5 Project, both also responsible for 5D's music. The main theme music of the film is "Makemagic" by Atsushi Tamura's band Jealkb.

=== English localization and release ===
During 4Kids Entertainment's quarterly conference call in March 2010, Chairman and Chief Executive Officer Alfred Khan said they are "participating in a brand new Yu-Gi-Oh! 3D movie," implying that 4Kids would produce an English-language version of the film for a Western release. A 20-minute preview for the English version of the film was shown at San Diego Comic Con 2010, and an American release date in early 2011 in select 3-D theaters was announced. The film's debut in the United States occurred at an event in New York on February 23, 2011. It included demonstrations of Konami's Yu-Gi-Oh! trading card game, the anime's voice actors, a costume contest, and benefited the Make-A-Wish Foundation of Metro New York.

Cinedigm showed the film in selected American stereoscopic 3D theaters on February 26 and 27, 2011, and on March 5 and 6, 2011. The version shown in the U.S. features a 10-minute recap of the three Yu-Gi-Oh! TV shows, made up of clips taken from those shows, which was not part of the Japanese release. Manga Entertainment holds the license to distribute the film in the United Kingdom. It was released in selected stereoscopic 3D cinemas on May 14 and 21, 2011, and the viewers gained a rare card for each ticket bought. The film was released on Blu-ray 3D and DVD on July 25, 2011; the release contains the English language and original Japanese versions. On July 15, 2014, it was released by New Video Group in North America on Blu-ray.

Like the TV series, the movie's English dub is heavily edited and localized for younger audiences outside Japan. Musical tracks and sound effects are all replaced with American-original ones, foreign text is erased or obscured, and the trading cards are visually edited in the same manner as the TV series to not resemble the actual real-life cards. Although 4Kids heavily edited the film, they did not censor Yubel's chest as they had previously done throughout the third season of Yu-Gi-Oh! GX.

== Reception ==
Yu-Gi-Oh! Bonds Beyond Time debuted at number six in the Japanese box office charts, earning over US$1 million in its first week from around 124 theaters. It grossed $2,017,928 in Japanese theatres, making it the 125th-highest-grossing film released in Japan in 2010. The DVD and Blu-ray releases of the film reached number two in the best-selling lists of their respective media. In the first week, the DVD edition sold 5,488 copies, while 4,653 copies of Blu-ray were sold in the same period. It was the film's UK distributor Manga Entertainment's second-best selling anime release of 2011. A representative of Manga Entertainment said, "I think [it was] because it was available in Asda and Morrisons, came with a free rare card and was stupidly cheap on [the] shelf". When it was broadcast by TV Tokyo in 2014, the film earned a 0.3 percent television viewership rating.

Andy Haley from UK Anime Network praised the English version and stated it is "arguably preferable even to the original Japanese audio". Haley praised the film "for keeping its focus and plot progression impeccably tight", which made it "an intense, non-stop experience". However, Haley said the film was created to increase the sale of cards; he commented it has "plot holes that even kids will see through as it serves only to bring its three characters together at one time and nothing more". Writing for The Guardian, Phelim O'Neill affirmed it has "a very limited style of animation" and that it may be exciting for children but for anyone over ten, "it'll be hard to see this as anything other than a shouty, tacky advert for things you'll never buy". Chris Homer of The Fandom Post praised the film's animation and the matching up of the three protagonists. He criticized it and stated the time travel and the antagonists motives are not well developed, "if at all about why he wants to get rid of what is basically a card game". Total Film's Jamie Russell wrote it is difficult for a non-fan of the series to appreciate. Bridget Fox, writing for Neo, also said it is "not for non-fans" but that it is good entertainment with "its frenetic pace, the capable animation, and its refusal to overcomplicate matters".
