= Yu-Gi-Oh! OCG Stories =

Japanese manga series

遊☆戯☆王OCG STORIES (Yu-Gi-Oh OCG Stories)
- Created by: Kazuki Takahashi
- Manga
- Written by: Shin Yoshida
- Illustrated by: Naohito Miyoshi
- Published by: Shueisha
- Magazine: V Jump
- Original run: April 21, 2022 – present
- Volumes: 7
- icon

Yu-Gi-Oh! OCG Stories is a Japanese manga spinoff of the Yu-Gi-Oh! Trading Card Game, adapting card storylines. It is written by Shin Yoshida and illustrated by Naohito Miyoshi.

== Production ==
Yu-Gi-Oh OCG Stories was announced on 17 April 2022 and began publication on 21 April. It was announced that the manga's first arc would adapt the Sky Striker Ace card storyline. The Sky Striker Ace arc ended on 20 October 2023. Following this, the manga went on a brief hiatus.

On 22 December 2023, following the conclusion of the Sky Striker arc, it was announced that the Magistus arc would follow, beginning on 19 January 2024. The Magistus arc ended on 20 February 2025, which was followed by a brief hiatus. The series returned on 21 May 2025 with the Magical War arc, which is a direct sequel to the Magistus arc.

== Volumes ==
#	Arc	Release date
1	Sky Striker Ace	2 December 2022
2	Sky Striker Ace	2 June 2023
3	Sky Striker Ace	4 January 2024
4	Magistus	4 October 2024
5	Magistus	4 April 2025
6	Magical War	5 January 2026
7	Magical War	3 July 2026
8	Magical War	4 February 2027
