= Yu-Gi-Oh! Zexal =

Japanese manga and anime series

- Also known as: Yu-Gi-Oh! Zexal II (S2)
- 遊☆戯☆王ZEXAL
- Genre: Adventure, fantasy
- Based on: Yu-Gi-Oh! by Kazuki Takahashi and Studio Dice
- Developed by: Shin Yoshida
- Directed by: Satoshi Kuwahara
- Music by: Conisch; Yasufumi Fukuda (II); Yutaka Minobe (II)
- No. of seasons: 2 (Note: Internationally, both Zexal and Zexal II were divided into three seasons each.)
- No. of episodes: 146 + 3 specials (list of episodes)

Production
- Producers: Ryō Sasaki (TV Tokyo); Teruaki Jitsumatsu (NAS)
- Animator: Gallop
- Production companies: TV Tokyo; NAS

Original release
- Network: TXN (TV Tokyo)
- Release: April 11, 2011 – March 23, 2014

Related
- Manga
- Written by: Shin Yoshida
- Illustrated by: Naohito Miyoshi
- Published by: Shueisha
- English publisher: NA: Viz Media
- Magazine: V Jump
- English magazine: NA: Weekly Shonen Jump
- Original run: December 2010 – June 2015
- Volumes: 9
- Manga

Yu-Gi-Oh! D-Team Zexal
- Written by: Akihiro Tomonaga
- Illustrated by: Wedge Holdings
- Published by: Shueisha
- Magazine: Saikyō Jump
- Original run: April 6, 2012 – May 19, 2014
- Other series
- List of all Yu-Gi-Oh! series; Yu-Gi-Oh! R
- Other media
- Video games; Trading card game

Yu-Gi-Oh! Zexal (遊☆戯☆王ZEXAL, Yū Gi Ō Zearu; pronounced "Zeyal"), stylized as Yu-Gi-Oh! ZEXAL, is a Japanese manga and anime series and the third spin-off of the Yu-Gi-Oh! franchise, after the preceding Yu-Gi-Oh! 5D's. The manga began serialization in Shueisha's V Jump magazine from December 2010 to June 2015 and is licensed in North America by Viz Media. The anime series was produced by Nihon Ad Systems, who owns the rights in Japan, and TV Tokyo, while the animation work was done by Gallop. It aired on TV Tokyo from April 2011 to September 2012, with an English-language version airing in North America between October 2011 and August 2013. A sequel series, titled Yu-Gi-Oh! Zexal II (遊☆戯☆王ZEXAL II, Yūgiō Zearu Sekando; pronounced "Ze-al Second"), aired in Japan from October 2012 to March 2014 and in North America from June 2013 to January 2016.

The series aired on The CW as part of the Toonzai and, later, Vortexx Saturday morning blocks. The series was later broadcast on Nicktoons starting April 12, 2013. After Vortexx ended, new episodes were streamed to Hulu beginning July 14, 2014. In Canada, the series aired on YTV starting June 2, 2012, while new episodes of Zexal II moved to Teletoon on May 4, 2014.

The series was succeeded by Yu-Gi-Oh! Arc-V, the fifth generation of the franchise.

== Plot and setting ==
Taking place in the near future in a place called Heartland City, the story focuses on Yuma Tsukumo, a young duelist who strives to become the Duel Monsters champion, despite being an amateur. One day, during a duel with a rival named Shark, a mysterious spirit called Astral appears before him, and helps him to win. Astral explains to Yuma he is searching for his lost memories, which have been transformed into 100 Xyz Monster (エクシーズ モンスター, Ekushīzu Monsutā) cards called Numbers (ナンバーズ, Nanbāzu), which have been scattered across the globe. The Numbers have the ability to possess the duelists who own them, and bring out their darkest desires. In order to recover his memories, Astral teams up with Yuma to recover the Number cards. After coming up against a boy named Kite Tenjo for the second time, who is hunting the Numbers, Yuma and Astral gain the ability to combine their forces using the power of ZEXAL (ゼアル, Zearu). Entering the World Duel Carnival tournament, Yuma finds himself up against various rivals, including the vengeance-seeking Vetrix and the maniacal Dr. Faker, who want the Numbers for their own gain.

Yu-Gi-Oh! Zexal II takes place right after the end of the first series. In this new story, as the curtain falls on the World Duel Carnival, peace has finally returned to Heartland City. But now, forces from Barian World, a world hostile to Astral's World, are aiming at taking the "Numbers" and Astral for themselves. In order to protect Astral, Yuma, Kite, and Shark stand together to combat the Barian threat.

The gameplay gimmick introduced in Zexal is AR Duels (Augmented Reality Duels), in which both players utilize a head-mounted device known as a Duel Gazer to observe a virtual reality where the Duel Monsters interact with the environment.

== Media ==
=== Manga ===
A manga series written by Shin Yoshida and illustrated by Naohito Miyoshi began serialization in the extended February 2011 issue of Shueisha's V Jump magazine, released on December 18, 2010. The first bound volume was released in Japan on June 3, 2011. Viz Media licensed the manga in North America and began releasing the series from June 5, 2012. The manga also began serialization on the digital Shonen Jump Alpha from July 9, 2012. A spin-off manga from the anime was written by Akihiro Tomonaga and illustrated by Wedge Holdings, titled Yu-Gi-Oh! D-Team Zexal (遊☆戯☆王 Dチーム・ゼアル, Yūgiō Dyueru Chīmu Zearu). It was serialized in Shueisha's Saikyō Jump magazine from April 2012 to April 2014.

=== Anime ===
The anime was first teased on December 9, 2010, revealing details would be unveiled at the Japanese encore screening of Yu-Gi-Oh! 3D: Bonds Beyond Time on February 20, 2011. The series' name was revealed on December 13, 2010, via a leak from the February 2011 issue of V Jump. It was revealed that Satoshi Kuwahara would be the director, that scripts would be supervised by Shin Yoshida, that Masahiro Hikokubo would choreograph the duels, and that Hirotoshi Takaya would create the character designs for the anime. A one-minute promotional video was released on December 17, 2010. The anime aired on TV Tokyo between April 11, 2011, and September 24, 2012. A second series titled Yu-Gi-Oh! Zexal II aired between October 7, 2012, and March 23, 2014, in a different time slot. Overall with both seasons, the total number of episodes are 146, plus 3 specials.

An English adaptation by 4Kids Entertainment premiered on October 15, 2011, on Toonzai. Although, TV Tokyo and Nihon Ad Systems filed a lawsuit against 4Kids Entertainment and demanded the termination of the Yu-Gi-Oh! licensing agreement with them in March 2011, a stay of proceedings was ordered preventing the termination of the contract or the resale of the franchise until a ruling was decided. Following the bankruptcy of 4Kids, all Yu-Gi-Oh! assets were acquired by Konami's subsidiary, Konami Cross Media NY (which at the time was named 4K Media Inc.). The series aired on Saban Brands' Vortexx block until it dissolved on September 27, 2014, and aired on Nicktoons from April 12, 2013. Episodes from #114 onwards were streamed on Hulu. Ultra Kidz premiered the series in the United States with Latin American Spanish dubbing on June 1, 2018. Yu-Gi-Oh! Zexal is the first Yu-Gi-Oh! series since the original to dub every episode in English.

=== Music ===
There are five official soundtrack CDs, all released by Marvelous Entertainment.

- The first, Yu-Gi-Oh! Zexal Sound Duel 1, was released on September 28, 2011.
- The second, Yu-Gi-Oh! Zexal Sound Duel 2, was released on September 19, 2012.
- The third, Yu-Gi-Oh! Zexal Sound Duel 3, was released on May 15, 2013.
- The fourth, Yu-Gi-Oh! Zexal Sound Duel 4, was released on November 13, 2013.
- The fifth, Yu-Gi-Oh! Zexal Sound Duel 5, was released on November 19, 2014.

Opening Themes

- "Masterpiece" (マスターピース, Masutāpīsu) by mihimaru GT (Eps 1–25, Ep 146 ending)
- "Braving!" (ブレイビング!, Bureibingu!) by Kanan (Eps 26–49)
- "Soul Drive" (魂ドライブ, Tamashii Doraibu) by Color Bottle (Eps 50–73)

Second season

- "Unbreakable Heart" (折れないハート, Orenai Hāto) by Hideaki Takatori (Eps 74–98)
- "Dualism of Mirrors" (鏡のデュアルイズム, Kagami no Dyuaruizumu) by Petit Milady (Aoi Yuki and Ayana Taketatsu) (Eps 99–123)
- "Wonder Wings" (ワンダーウィングス, Wandā Wingusu) by Diamond☆Yukai (Eps 124–145)

Ending Themes

- "My Quest" (僕クエスト, Boku Kuesuto) by Golden Bomber (Eps 1–25)
- "Longing Freesia" (切望のフリージア, Setsubō no Furījia) by Daizystripper (Eps 26–49)
- "Wild Child" (ワイルドチャイルド, Wairudo Chairudo) by Moumoon (Eps 50–73)

Second season

- "Artist" (アーティスト, Ātisuto) by Vistlip (Eps 74–98)
- "Go Way Go Way" (ゴーウェイゴーウェイ, Gō Wei Gō Wei) by FoZZtone (Eps 99–123)
- "Challenge the GAME" (チャレンジザゲーム, Charenji Za Gēmu) by REDMAN (Eps 124–145)

English Opening Theme

- "Take a Chance" by Michael Brady, Shane Guenego, Arthur Murakami, & Surefire Music Group (Eps 1–73)
- "Halfway to Forever" by Michael Brady, Shane Guenego, Arthur Murakami, Jonathan Lattif, & Surefire Music Group (Eps 74–146)

=== Trading Card Game ===
Yu-Gi-Oh! Zexal added new gameplay elements to the Yu-Gi-Oh! Trading Card Game, in which Master Rule 2 came into effect by introducing the Xyz Monsters into the game. These black-colored cards do not have levels, but are categorized by Ranks, which are signified by a number of left-aligned stars with a black background printed on the card. Xyz Monsters are summoned from the Extra Deck by stacking multiple monsters on the field of the same level on top of each other and placing the desired Xyz Monster whose Rank is the same as the two stacked monsters' levels, on top of those monsters. During gameplay, the stacked monsters become "Xyz Materials", or "Overlay Units", which are used to trigger the Xyz Monster's effects by being sent to the Graveyard.

=== Video game ===
A video game based on the series titled Yu-Gi-Oh! Zexal: Gekitotsu! Duel Carnival (遊戯王ZEXAL 激突!デュエルカーニバル, Yūgiō Zearu: Gekitotsu! Dueru Kānibaru) was developed by Konami and released in Japan for the Nintendo 3DS on December 5, 2013. It was released as Yu-Gi-Oh! Zexal: World Duel Carnival in North America on September 25, 2014.
