= Yu-Gi-Oh! GX =

Japanese anime series and spin-off

- 遊☆戯☆王デュエルモンスターズGX
- Genre: Adventure, science fiction
- Based on: Yu-Gi-Oh! by Kazuki Takahashi and Studio Dice
- Developed by: Junki Takegami (#1–156); Shin Yoshida (#157–180)
- Directed by: Hatsuki Tsuji
- Music by: Yutaka Minobe
- Country of origin: Japan
- Original language: Japanese
- No. of episodes: 180 (Note: Only 155 episodes were shown internationally.) (list of episodes)

Production
- Producers: Norio Yamakawa (TV Tokyo); Naoki Sasada (NAS); Teruaki Jitsumatsu (NAS)
- Animator: Gallop
- Production companies: TV Tokyo; NAS

Original release
- Network: TXN (TV Tokyo)
- Release: October 6, 2004 – March 26, 2008

Related
- Manga
- Written by: Naoyuki Kageyama
- Published by: Shueisha
- English publisher: NA: Viz Media
- Magazine: V Jump
- English magazine: NA: Shonen Jump
- Original run: December 17, 2005 – March 19, 2011
- Volumes: 9
- Anime film
- Yu-Gi-Oh! Bonds Beyond Time
- Other series
- List of all Yu-Gi-Oh! series; Yu-Gi-Oh! R
- Other media
- Video games; Trading card game

Yu-Gi-Oh! GX, also known in Japan as Yu-Gi-Oh! Duel Monsters GX (Japanese: 遊☆戯☆王デュエルモンスターズGX, Hepburn: Yū Gi Ō Dyueru Monsutāzu Jī Ekkusu), is a Japanese anime television series. It is a spin-off and sequel to the Yu-Gi-Oh! Duel Monsters anime series, which itself is based on the original manga series of the same title by Kazuki Takahashi. It was broadcast for 180 episodes on TV Tokyo from October 2004 to March 2008. Yu-Gi-Oh! GX follows the exploits of Jaden Yuki (Judai Yuki in the Japanese versions) and his companions as he attends Duel Academia (Duel Academy in the 4Kids version). The series was released in English in North America by 4Kids Entertainment. A manga adaptation by Naoyuki Kageyama was serialized in Shueisha's magazine V Jump from December 2005 to March 2011, with its chapters collected in nine tankōbon volumes. The series was followed by Yu-Gi-Oh! 5D's in 2008.

== Plot ==
Taking place several years after the events of Yu-Gi-Oh! Duel Monsters, Yu-Gi-Oh! GX follows a new generation of duelists including a young boy named Jaden Yuki (Judai Yuki) who attends Duel Academy, a school founded by Seto Kaiba, where aspiring duelists train in the field of Duel Monsters. The academy has an internal ranking system based on the "Egyptian God" cards from the original series. Obelisk Blue is the highest dorm and is filled with only the best duelists or those who come from elite families. Ra Yellow is the second-highest dorm and is made up of duelists who score and perform well in school and have the potential to be the best. Slifer Red is the lowest dorm and consists of those who do not perform well and need much help to improve. Students are able to graduate to the next dorm if they show improvement. In the universe of Yu-Gi-Oh!, this series focuses on the type of summoning called "Fusion Summon", which the protagonist and many characters perform.

For the first year at Duel Academy, Jaden befriends many students such as Syrus Truesdale (Sho Marufuji), Jaden's roommate with low self esteem and Zane's brother, Chumley Huffington (Hayato Maeda), a portly Slifer student who secretly dreams of being a card designer, Alexis Rhodes (Asuka Tenjoin), one of the top female duelists, Bastion Misawa (Daichi Misawa), an excellent duelist with an extremely high intellect, Chazz Princeton (Jun Manjoume), one of Jaden's rivals with an elitist personality, and Zane Truesdale (Ryo Marufuji), Jaden's other rival and the best duelist in the school. Together the main cast faced major threats including the Shadow Riders (Seven Stars), who intended to revive the Sacred Beasts, powerful cards that could destroy the world. This group was led by Kagemaru and consisted of Nightshroud (Alexis's brother Atticus possessed by darkness), Camula (a vampire), Tania (an Amazon Warrior), Don Zaloog (a duel spirit), Abydos (an Egyptian pharaoh), Titan (an illusionist) and Amnael (an alchemist who posed as the Slifer Red's dorm advisor, Professor Banner). After the Shadow Riders are defeated, Zane chooses Jaden to duel him in his graduation match which ends in the only draw of the series, after which he passes on the title of top duelist in the school to Jaden.

In the second year, Jaden meets Aster Phoenix (Edo Phoenix), a dueling prodigy, and Tyranno Hassleberry (Tyranno Kenzan), a duelist with a love for the army and dinosaurs. The main cast then face off against the Society of Light, a cult-like organization who infiltrated Duel Academy. They are led by Sartorius, Aster's manager, and intend to brainwash humanity with the powerful "Light of Destruction", a light in space that has the ability to corrupt. It is revealed that when one loses a duels with someone from the Society of Light, they also become brainwashed and become one of their members. This caused many of Jaden's friends, namely Chazz, Alexis, and Bastion, to become Jaden's enemy. Jaden learns that he has the ability to talk to Duel Spirits (similar to Yugi Mutou) due to his ability to use the "Gentle Darkness", a force created to balance out the Light of Destruction. He uses this to beat Sartorious and free everyone from the influence.

In the third year, Duel Academy is transported to another dimension, a desert plane with three suns and resident Duel Monster spirits, ruled by Yubel, a duel monster who was corrupted by the light. Upon returning home, Jaden and a select group of his partners dive back into the alternate dimension to recover their missing companions. After seeing his friends sacrificed, Jaden falls into despair and becomes possessed by the Supreme King, a ruthless and merciless ruler and the original wielder of the Gentle Darkness, which granted him immense power. During his time as the Supreme King, Jaden commits many crimes such as burning down villages, enslaving civilians, and sometimes even executing others. He is later freed of the influence by his friends in a duel, but is left with an immense amount of guilt. It is later revealed that Jaden in fact is the reincarnation of the Supreme King, and the Supreme King's power is a part of him. Jaden faces off against Yubel and learns that Yubel actually was the guardian of the Supreme King who was sworn to always be with him and protect him. Yubel was driven insane by the Light of Destruction and wishes to fuse all dimensions together so she could always be with Jaden. Seeing that Yubel was just trying to fulfill her promise, Jaden decides to use "Super Polymerization" and fuse himself with Yubel to help fulfill that promise and cleanse her of her corruption.

Later in the third year, Jaden returns to Duel Academy for his graduation period. Since he fused himself with Yubel, he has gained her powers as well as her bi-chromatic eyes when he uses her powers. However, since he came back from the alternate dimension, he has become more solitary and distant from his friends as he does not wish to cause trouble for anyone anymore. He also lost his happy-go-lucky personality and his love for dueling; having endured such horrors over the past three years at Duel Academy, his belief that one duels for fun and enjoying themselves has been sapped out of him, and he only duels for survival. Despite this, Jaden is confronted by Nightshroud, the same spirit that possessed Atticus back in his first year, who tells Jaden that he will engulf this world in darkness by feeding off the negative emotions of humanity. Jaden originally fights off his minions until he comes face to face with Nightshroud himself. He duels him and successfully defeats him, freeing everyone of their darkness. During their remaining time, Jaden had slowly grown closer to his friends once again and began to reclaim his love for dueling, but on his final night, Jaden decided to leave the academy without saying goodbye. He is then stopped by an adult Yugi Mutou who transports him back in time for his 'graduation match' against Yugi Mutou from the past. During this duel, Jaden reflects on his time at Duel Academy and the great friendships he has made along the way. He expresses his gratitude towards Yugi and officially reclaims his old personality and, spurred on by the opportunity to battle one of Yugi's Egyptian God cards (in this case, Slifer the Sky Dragon), his love of dueling once again.

== Production ==
Yu-Gi-Oh! GX is produced by Nihon Ad Systems and TV Tokyo, and the animation is handled by Studio Gallop. The series was directed by Hatsuki Tsuji and scripts were prepared by an alternating lineup of writers–Shin Yoshida, Atsushi Maekawa, Akemi Omode, Yasuyuki Suzuki–with music arrangements by Yutaka Minobe. Takuya Hiramitsu is in charge of sound direction, supervised by Yūji Mitsuya. Character and monster designs are overseen by Kenichi Hara, while Duel layout is overseen by Masahiro Hikokubo. The "GX" in the series' title is short for the term "Generation neXt". "GENEX" was conceived as the series' original title, as can be evidenced in early promotional artwork. It also refers to the GX tournament that takes place between episodes 84 and 104.

A remastered version, to celebrate its 20th anniversary, is set to air on TV Tokyo starting in April 2025.

== Media ==
=== Anime ===
The 180-episode series aired on TV Tokyo between October 6, 2004, and March 26, 2008, and was followed by Yu-Gi-Oh! 5D's.

It was subsequently licensed by 4Kids Entertainment, adapted into English, and picked up by Cartoon Network, first as part of the Miguzi block before shifting to Toonami on October 28, 2006, and on the 4KidsTV block on Fox in North America. Like previous 4Kids adaptations, several changes were made from the original Japanese version, including the names and personalities of characters, the soundtrack, the sound effects, visuals such as Life Point counters, and the appearance of cards. The story and some of the visuals are also edited to remove references to death, blood, violence and religion in order to make the series suitable for a younger audience. Also any written language text, either Japanese or English is erased or replaced with unreadable content. These edits are also used in various localizations of the show in countries outside of Asia where 4Kids had distribution rights. The US broadcast of the third season was first delayed for two months after the conclusion of the second season, then extended to run over the course of 16 months until the end of August 2008. The last episode of the third season and the fourth season in its entirety were not dubbed for unknown reasons (possibly as consequence of the third season's delays leading to too large of an episode gap between the Japanese and North American airing schedules), leaving them for many years as Japanese-exclusive, with Yu-Gi-Oh! 5D's beginning to be run in September 2008, three weeks after the US broadcast airing of GX season 3's last dubbed episode.

Dubbed episodes were uploaded onto 4Kids' YouTube page until March 29, 2011, when Nihon Ad Systems and TV Tokyo sued 4Kids and terminated the licensing agreement for the franchise. The series was later licensed by 4K Media Inc. Hulu and Crunchyroll started streaming dubbed episodes, with the latter beginning to stream the English subtitled version of the series in August 2015.

=== Music ===
Japanese
Opening themes
1. "Fine Weather Hallelujah" (快晴・上昇・ハレルーヤ, Kaisei Josho Harerûya) by Jindou (episodes 1–33)
2. "99%" by Bowl (episodes 34–104)
3. "Teardrop" (ティアドロップ, Tiadoroppu) by Bowl (episodes 105–156)
4. "Precious Time, Glory Days" by Psychic Lover (episodes 157–180)

Ending themes

1. "Genkai Battle" (限界バトル, Genkai Batoru) by JAM Project (episodes 1–33)
2. "Wake up your Heart" by Kenn (episodes 34–104)
3. "The Sun" (太陽, Taiyou) by Bite the Lung (episodes 105–156)
4. "Endless Dream" by Hiroshi Kitadani (episodes 157–180)

English

1. "Get Your Game On" by Lucas Papaelias

=== Manga ===
Written and illustrated by Naoyuki Kageyama, under supervision by Kazuki Takahashi, the Yu-Gi-Oh! GX manga series was serialized in Shueisha's V Jump magazine from December 17, 2005, to March 19, 2011. Shueisha collected its chapters in nine tankōbon volumes, released from November 2, 2006, to June 3, 2011. A one-shot was published in V Jump on June 21, 2014.

In North America, the manga was licensed for English release by Viz Media. The series ran in the Shonen Jump manga anthology from the January 2007 to the January 2010 issues. Viz Media released the nine volumes from November 6, 2007, to August 7, 2012.

=== Video games ===
Several video games based on Yu-Gi-Oh! GX have been developed and published by Konami.

Two games were released for Game Boy Advance; Yu-Gi-Oh! Ultimate Masters: World Championship Tournament 2006, and Yu-Gi-Oh! GX Duel Academy.

Three games have been released for Nintendo DS; Yu-Gi-Oh! Duel Monsters GX Spirit Caller, Yu-Gi-Oh! Duel Monsters World Championship 2007 and Yu-Gi-Oh! World Championship 2008. A fourth title, Yu-Gi-Oh! Duel Monsters GX Card Almanac, is not actually a game, but a catalog of cards up to 2007.

The Tag Force series has appeared on the PlayStation Portable, which adds the ability to form tag team duels, with the first three games in the series being based on the GX series (subsequent games are based on Yu-Gi-Oh! 5D's). The titles are Yu-Gi-Oh! GX Tag Force, Yu-Gi-Oh! GX Tag Force 2 and Yu-Gi-Oh! GX Tag Force 3. The first game was also ported to PlayStation 2 as Yu-Gi-Oh! GX: Tag Force Evolution. So far, Tag Force 3 has not been released in North America. It was however, released in Europe, and its follow up, Yu-Gi-Oh! 5D's Tag Force 4, has been released in all regions including North America.

=== Other media ===
In 2007, Eaglemoss productions signed a deal to release a magazine based upon the Yu-Gi-Oh! GX franchise named Yu-Gi-Oh! GX Ultimate Guide.

The artist Inu Mayuge wrote a Yu-Gi-Oh! GX parody titled De-I-Ko! GX (犬☆眉☆毛DE-I-KO! GX), posted in V Jump on June 25, 2009.
