= Shin Yoshida =

Japanese anime and tokusatsu drama screenwriter

- 吉田 伸
- Born: Shin Yoshida; June 21, 1966 (age 60); Ibaraki Prefecture, Japan
- Occupations: Screenwriter, manga author

Shin Yoshida (吉田 伸, Yoshida Shin; born June 21, 1966) is a Japanese anime screenwriter and manga author.

== Filmography ==
=== Anime television series ===
- Calimero (1992–1993) - Screenplay, Art and Literature
- Flower Angel Ten-Ten (1998–1999) - Screenplay
- The Big O (1999–2000) - Screenplay
- Yu-Gi-Oh! Duel Monsters (2000–2004) - Series Composition (episodes 145–184, 199–224), Screenplay
- Dinozaurs (2000) - Screenplay
- Argento Soma (2001) - Screenplay
- Sadamitsu the Destroyer (2001) - Screenplay
- Z.O.E. Dolores, I (2001) - Series Composition, Screenplay
- Witch Hunter Robin (2002) - Screenplay
- Crush Gear Nitro (2003) - Screenplay
- Machine Robo Rescue (2003) - Screenplay
- Texhnolyze (2003) - Screenplay
- Kurau Phantom Memory (2004) - Screenplay
- Yu-Gi-Oh! Duel Monsters GX (2004–2008) - Series Composition (episodes 157–180), Screenplay
- Speed Grapher (2005) - Series Composition, Screenplay
- Naruto (2006) - Screenplay
- Yu-Gi-Oh! 5D's (2008–2011) - Series Composition (episodes 27–154), Screenplay
- Naruto Shippuden (2009–2016) - Series Composition (episodes 459–468), Screenplay
- Yu-Gi-Oh! Zexal (2011–2012) - Series Composition, Screenplay
- Sacred Seven (2011) - Series Composition, Screenplay
- Yu-Gi-Oh! Zexal II (2012–2014) - Series Composition, Screenplay
- Baby Steps (Season 2) (2015) - Screenplay
- Yu-Gi-Oh! VRAINS (2017–2019) - Series Composition, Screenplay
- Girly Air Force (2019) - Screenplay
- Hypnosis Mic: Division Rap Battle: Rhyme Anima (2020) - Series Composition, Screenplay
- Dragon Quest: The Adventure of Dai (2020) (2022) - Screenplay
- Hypnosis Mic: Division Rap Battle: Rhyme Anima + (2023) - Series Composition, Screenplay
- Psyren (2026) - Series Composition

=== Tokusatsu ===
- Ultraman Dyna (1997–1998) - Screenplay
- Ultraman Gaia (1998–1999) - Screenplay
- Booska! Booska!! (1999–2000) - Screenplay
- Ninpu Sentai Hurricanger (2002–2003) - Screenplay
- Heisei Ultraseven (2002) - Screenplay

=== Original video animation ===
- Zone of the Enders: 2167 Idolo (2001) - Screenplay
- Karas (2005–2007) - Series Composition, Screenplay

=== Original net animation ===
- Intrigue in the Bakumatsu – Irohanihoheto (2007) - Screenplay
- Isekai Izakaya: Japanese Food From Another World (2018) - Series Composition, Screenplay

=== Films ===
- Yu-Gi-Oh! Bonds Beyond Time (2010) - Screenplay

=== Manga ===
- Yu-Gi-Oh! Zexal manga (2010–2015) - Story
- Yu-Gi-Oh! Arc-V manga (2015–2019) - Story
- Yu-Gi-Oh! OCG Stories (2022) - Story

=== Video game ===
- Onimusha: Warlords (2001) - Screenplay
- Bounty Hunter Sara: Holy Mountain no Teiō (2001) - Scenario
- Onimusha 2: Samurai's Destiny (2002) - Screenplay
- Dino Crisis 3 (2003) - Scenario
- Onimusha 3: Demon Siege (2004) - Screenplay
- Naruto Shippuden: Ultimate Ninja Storm Generations (2012) - Screenplay Support
