= Yu-Gi-Oh! 5D's =

Japanese anime series and spin-off

- 遊☆戯☆王5D's
- Genre: Adventure, science fiction
- Based on: Yu-Gi-Oh! by Kazuki Takahashi and Studio Dice
- Developed by: Atsuhiro Tomioka (#1–26); Shin Yoshida (#27–154); Masahiro Hikokubo (Note: Duel Composition (デュエル構成))
- Directed by: Katsumi Ono (#1–85, 93–154) (Note: Chief director (総監督) for episodes #86–92); Naoki Hishikawa (#86–92)
- Music by: Yutaka Minobe; Wall 5 Project
- Country of origin: Japan
- Original language: Japanese
- No. of episodes: 154 + 1 special (Note: Only 123 episodes were shown internationally) (list of episodes)

Production
- Producers: Norio Yamakawa (TV Tokyo); Teruaki Jitsumatsu (TV Tokyo); Ryō Sasaki (TV Tokyo); Fukashi Azuma
- Animator: Gallop
- Production companies: TV Tokyo; NAS

Original release
- Network: TXN (TV Tokyo)
- Release: April 2, 2008 – March 30, 2011

Related
- Manga
- Written by: Masahiro Hikokubo
- Illustrated by: Masashi Satou
- Published by: Shueisha
- English publisher: NA: Viz Media
- Magazine: V Jump
- English magazine: NA: Shonen Jump
- Original run: August 21, 2009 – January 21, 2015
- Volumes: 9
- Anime film
- Yu-Gi-Oh! Bonds Beyond Time
- Other series
- List of all Yu-Gi-Oh! series; Yu-Gi-Oh! R
- Other media
- Video games; Trading card game

Yu-Gi-Oh! 5D's (遊☆戯☆王5D's, Yū Gi Ō Faibu Dīzu) is the second main spin-off of the Yu-Gi-Oh! franchise, succeeding Yu-Gi-Oh! GX, in celebration of the 40th anniversary of Weekly Shōnen Jump and the 15th anniversary of V Jump. The series aired from April 2008 to March 2011.

The story focuses on characters playing a card game called Duel Monsters, and introduces Synchro Monsters to the Yu-Gi-Oh! Trading Card Game. A new method of duelling exists where motorcycle-like vehicles called D-Wheels (Duel Runners in the English version) are used, and the duelists engage in games called Riding Duels (Turbo Duels in the English version). The show is set in the distant future, where the upper-class population live in Neo Domino City (New Domino City in the English version) and the lower class in Satellite, a remote island where Domino's sewage is transported. Yusei Fudo, the 18-year-old protagonist, lives in Satellite and makes it his objective to reach his rival Jack Atlas, who lives in Neo Domino, with plans to defeat him in a duel and reclaim his prized card, Stardust Dragon. The series focuses on the five Signers, people embodied with a mark of one of the legendary Five Dragons who serve an ancient deity called the Crimson Dragon, and their conflict with the Dark Signers and the Three Emperors of Iliaster.

As with the previous two anime series (Yu-Gi-Oh! Duel Monsters and Yu-Gi-Oh! GX), Yu-Gi-Oh! 5D's was acquired by 4Kids Entertainment for broadcasting in the United States in September 2008. The series aired on The CW4Kids from September 13, 2008, to September 10, 2011, though 31 episodes were left unaired and undubbed. The English-language version premiered on July 24 at San Diego Comic-Con 2008, where the first English-dubbed episode was previewed. Like the previous two English dubs, changes have been made to the plot, cards, and character names. On June 1, 2009, the series began airing 5 days a week on Cartoon Network. A manga based on the show began serialization in V Jump monthly magazine from August 2009 to January 2015. The dubbed version of the series did not include the final episodes of the Japanese version, consisting of the Ark Cradle arc and the battle with Z-one; it instead ends after the battle between Team 5D's and Aporia in the WRGP.

The series was succeeded by Yu-Gi-Oh! Zexal, which introduced the brand new Xyz Summoning method.

== Plot ==
Yu-Gi-Oh! 5D's is set in the distant future, in Neo Domino City.

Seventeen years ago, Moment, a reactor within the city, malfunctioned and caused a great earthquake that split the city into two parts: Satellite, the former Domino City which is now the rundown and poverty-stricken part, and Neo Domino City, the wealthier and urban part. In order to keep the two areas separate, access to the city from Satellite is strictly prohibited and can result in imprisonment. Yusei Fudo, an aspiring duelist from Satellite, builds his own Duel Runner (D-Wheel in the Japanese version), but his best friend Jack Atlas betrays him and steals his vehicle along with his most precious monster, Stardust Dragon, escaping to Neo Domino.

Two years later, Yusei builds another Duel Runner and secretly travels to the city to win back his Dragon. Jack has made a name for himself and his monster, Red Dragon Archfiend, as the current Turbo Duel King in Neo Domino City. As Yusei and Jack face each other in a Turbo Duel, their arms glow red and a third red dragon appears, bringing an end to the fight. This attracts the attention of Rex Goodwin, the head of the Public Security Maintenance Bureau. He reveals to Jack a five-thousand-year-old secret, involving the "People of the Stars" (星の民, Hoshi no Tami), a pre-Incan civilization, the "Crimson Dragon" (赤き竜, Akaki Ryū), and "Signers" (シグナー, Shigunā), identified by a red birthmark on their arm that represents a part of the dragon. Goodwin also reveals that Jack and Yusei are both Signers and holds a tournament to find the other three. Two of the other Signers turn out to be child duelist Luna and psychic duelist Akiza. In the final battle, the four Signers see a vision of the future with Satellite in ruins.

Goodwin reveals that the Signers are destined to face the Dark Signers, duelists resurrected from the dead to serve the evil Earthbound Gods. The Signers head to Satellite to face the Dark Signers, which consist of Rex's brother Roman Goodwin, a former Signer with the dragon's Head mark and leader of the Dark Signers; Kalin Kessler, a former friend of Yusei, Jack, and Crow Hogan; Devack, who stole the Ancient Fairy Dragon card, Luna's Signer Dragon; Misty Tredwell, a model who blames Akiza for the death of her brother Toby; Greiger, who blamed Rex Goodwin for his village's disappearance; and briefly Carly, a blogger with feelings for Jack. With the help of Leo, Luna's twin brother, and Crow Hogan, Yusei and Jack's best friend, they are able to defeat the Dark Signers. However, Rex Goodwin reveals that he has become a Dark Signer and uses his brother's severed arm to become a Signer, seeking to rebuild the world in his image using the power of both light and shadows. Yusei, Jack, and Crow then face him in a Turbo Duel in order to stop him and the King of the Netherworld from finishing off the Signers and destroying the world. Before the final attack, Yusei gains the Head mark, making him the new leader, while Crow gains his former Tail mark, making him the fifth Signer. With the power of the Crimson Dragon and Yusei's Majestic Star Dragon, he defeats Goodwin, who, along with Roman, sacrifices himself to destroy the King of the Netherworld and revive the Dark Signers as normal people.

After the Dark Signers' defeat, Neo Domino City and Satellite are reunited into one prosperous city with the building of the "Daedalus Bridge", a net of roads linking them with some sections also used for Turbo Duels. Yusei and his friends, now calling themselves "Team 5D's", prepare for the upcoming World Riding Duel Grand Prix (WRGP) tournament. A new threat appears: the Three Emperors of Iliaster, whose main monsters, the "Machine Emperors", can absorb Synchro Monsters from their opponents to empower themselves. Yusei encounters fellow competitor Sherry LeBlanc, who is investigating the Iliaster organization due to them being reportedly responsible for her parents' deaths. Team 5D's is also joined by a mysterious amnesiac mechanic named Bruno, who befriends the team and helps them prepare for the WRGP. The WRGP soon begins, with Team 5D's facing tough opponents such as Team Unicorn, a world-ranked dueling team, Team Taiyo, a new dueling team who started with nothing, and Team Ragnarok, who possess special abilities like the Signers. Yusei and Jack develop the "Clear Mind" and "Burning Soul" abilities, respectively, upgrading their ace monsters into forms capable of dodging the Machine Emperors' absorption effects. Team 5D's eventually confront the Emperors, who are revealed to be three different incarnations of Aporia, a cyborg sent from the future to destroy Neo Domino City and prevent a great calamity from befalling mankind in the future.

Although Team 5D's defeats Aporia and wins the WRGP, a massive citadel known as the Ark Cradle appears, threatening to crash into and destroy Neo Domino City, and they climb aboard the Cradle to stop it. Before reaching the core of the fortress, they confront three individuals guarding its access: Akiza and Crow face Sherry, who was promised to have her parents returned to her; Yusei faces Bruno, who recovered his memories of being Antinomy, another member of Iliaster; and Jack, Leo, and Luna face Aporia. Leo dies during the duel and is revived by the Crimson Dragon, becoming the sixth Signer bearing the mark of the dragon's Heart. The Signers finally reach Z-one, Iliaster's leader, and Yusei borrows his friends' dragons to add them to his deck, challenging Z-one to a final Turbo Duel to decide Neo Domino City's future. Z-one is revealed to be a scientist from the future who assumed Yusei's identity and traveled back in time to prevent the destruction of humanity. Using his friends' cards, Yusei performs a "Limit Over Accel Synchro" and summons his strongest monster, "Shooting Quasar Dragon", defeating Z-one. Z-one decides to entrust the future of mankind to Yusei before sacrificing himself to destroy the Ark Cradle and save Neo Domino City from destruction.

Several months later, following a final duel between Jack and Yusei, the former members of Team 5D's go their separate ways, with Yusei staying behind in Neo Domino City to research a way to stop the destruction of humanity in the future. As they drive off, the Crimson Dragon appears for the final time and removes the Dragon Marks on the Signers' arms, signifying that the danger has now passed. The Signers leave the city knowing they will be connected with each other and will return after fulfilling their dreams.

== Themes ==
The first story arc addresses themes such as social class division, segregation, and discrimination, depicted through the interactions between residents of Neo Domino City and Satellite. The Dark Signer arc deals with the relationship between past and present, as the heroes, especially Yusei, Aki, and Jack, must come to terms with the questionable actions they, or their family members, have made. The final two arcs, the World Grand Prix and Ark Cradle, build on the previous arc by exploring the connection between present and future, as time travel plays a major role in how the story unfolds. Synchro Monsters also play a major role in the final two arcs, as their subsequent overuse in the future prompts the antagonists to seek the destruction of Neo Domino City. Lastly, just like all Yu-Gi-Oh! series, 5D's places an emphasis on bonds and friendships.

Similar to how the original series utilized elements of Egyptian mythology to drive the plot, 5D's used aspects of Incan mythology, such as the Nazca Lines, early on to set the groundwork for its supernatural phenomena and lore. To push this motif even further, the manga, which featured an entirely different plot from the anime, depicted the origin of Riding Duels being played on horseback in coliseums by Ancient Incan civilizations. It also uses aspects of Aztec mythology; in the Japanese version, Greiger (Bomber) revealed to Yusei and Jack that the Crimson Dragon's name was Quetzalcoatl, an Aztec god.

== Media ==
=== Anime ===
Yu-Gi-Oh! 5D's was produced by Nihon Ad Systems and TV Tokyo, and the show's animation was handled by Studio Gallop. It aired on TV Tokyo between April 2, 2008, and March 30, 2011, following the end of the previous series, Yu-Gi-Oh! GX. As with the previous two series (Yu-Gi-Oh! and Yu-Gi-Oh! GX), this series was licensed by 4Kids Entertainment. Yu-Gi-Oh! 5D's began airing on The CW4Kids, starting on September 13, 2008, and later aired on Cartoon Network. On May 29, 2010, the series once again began airing in 1-hour episode blocks on the CW4Kids. The series moved over to the Toonzai block on September 18, 2010. The last episode of the dubbed series aired on September 10, 2011, leaving out several episodes from the Japanese broadcast due to low ratings, pressure to air its successor Yu-Gi-Oh! Zexal, and an ongoing lawsuit from TV Tokyo and NAS. As a result, 5D's became the second series to not have a complete English dub. Changes were made to the plot and cards, character names were localized, and violent scenes were edited.

In Germany, however, the dub had caught up to the 4Kids dub and decided to stop using it and began adapting the show directly from Japan from episode 65 onward. While the original voice cast from the first 64 episodes was still used, the show no longer edited quite as much, used the original music (including the original Japanese opening and ending themes), and adapted their scripts directly from the original Japanese scripts rather than from the revised English scripts. However, the dubbing of the show stopped at episode 116 for unknown reasons, leaving the remaining 38 episodes undubbed.

On September 22, 2010, Toonzaki and Hulu uploaded unedited, subtitled, and edited, dubbed episodes of Yu-Gi-Oh! 5D's. These episodes use the English names for the cards instead of the Japanese names. In an Anime News Network interview with Mark Kirk, Senior Vice President of Digital Media for 4Kids Entertainment, Kirk claimed this was for legal reasons.

On April 2, 2018, the series was released with Latin American Spanish dubbing in the United States (for US Hispanic audiences) on ¡Sorpresa!. Subsequently, the series was uploaded on the streaming service VEMOX, also in Spanish.

=== Manga ===
A manga adaptation, written by Masahiro Hikokubo and illustrated by Masashi Sato, was serialized in Shueisha's V Jump magazine from August 21, 2009, to January 21, 2015.

The series has been licensed by Viz Media for North America.

=== Trading card game ===
Yu-Gi-Oh! 5D's added a new gameplay element to the Yu-Gi-Oh! Trading Card Game, in which Master Rules came into effect by introducing Synchro Summoning to the game. To Synchro Summon the new white-colored Synchro Monsters, a Tuner Monster and a non-Tuner monster are required to be on the field, and their added levels must equal the desired Synchro Monster to be summoned. A new monster type known as Psychic was also added to the game.

Another type of gameplay mechanic unique to the anime version was also introduced, called "Dark Synchro Summon", which is the thematic opposite of the normal Synchro Summon. In the normal Synchro Summon, the levels of the Tuner monster(s) and non-Tuner monster(s) are added up to be equal to the level of the summoned monster, whereas Dark Synchro Summon subtracts the level of the non-Tuner monster from the anime-exclusive Dark Tuner monster's, instead. The card game has released these "Dark Synchro Monsters" as regular Synchro Monsters, though they require a DARK-attribute Tuner monster instead as opposed to Konami releasing Dark Tuners.

=== Video games ===
There are several video games developed by Konami based on the Yu-Gi-Oh! 5D's franchise.

Yu-Gi-Oh! 5D's: Wheelie Breakers, released on March 26, 2009, is a racing game for the Wii console in which players can use cards to lower other people's life points and defeat them. Unlike the card game, monsters use Speed Counters to attack their opponents, and players do not lose if their life points hit zero, rather they are unable to continue racing. The promotional cards are Skull Flame, Burning Skull Head, and Supersonic Skull Flame.

Yu-Gi-Oh! 5D's Stardust Accelerator, released on March 26, 2009, is a game for the Nintendo DS that continues the World Championship series of games. The game uses the World Championship 2009 software, and also features a story mode, in which a duelist tries to get his memory back. In the video game Yu-Gi-Oh! 5D's World Championship 2009: Stardust Accelerator, winning all single tournaments appears as an unlockable opponent: Endymion, the Master Magician, known as Divine Magician Deity Endymion in the Japanese version, is a character version of the card, "Endymion, the Master Magician". The promotional cards are Infernity Archfiend, Infernity Dwarf, and Infernity Guardian.

Yu-Gi-Oh! 5D's: Reverse of Arcadia, also for the Nintendo DS, is also part of the World Championship series. Set during the Dark Signers arc, the player controls a former member of the Enforcers who has been brainwashed by the Arcadia movement.

The promotional cards are Stygian Security, Samurai Sword Baron and Stygian Sergeants. Yu-Gi-Oh! 5D's World Championship 2011: Over the Nexus was released on February 24, 2011. The game features over 4,200 cards and a Puzzle Editor. This game was released in Japan on February 18, 2010, in North America on February 23, 2010, and in Europe on March 26, 2010. Its promotional cards are Sorciere de Fleur, Z-ONE and Necro Fleur.

Yu-Gi-Oh! 5D's Tag Force 4, released on September 17, 2009, is a game for the PSP system, the fourth game in the Tag Force series. The game features the Dark Synchro and Dark Tuner monsters from the 2nd season of the anime. The promotional cards are Warm Worm, Worm Bait, and Regret Reborn. This was followed by Yu-Gi-Oh! 5D's Tag Force 5, which was released on September 16, 2010, and set during the third season of the anime. A last game, Yu-Gi-Oh! 5D's Tag Force 6, was later released that covered up until the end of the series.

Yu-Gi-Oh! 5D's Decade Duels for the Xbox Live Arcade was released on November 3, 2010, and is a game that features online leader boards and voice chat functionality, as well as the ability to buy extra cards via Xbox Live Marketplace. The game was removed from the service in June 2012. It returned as Yu-Gi-Oh! 5D's Decade Duels Plus on November 21, 2012, but it was removed on the same day for unknown reasons. It reappeared again on February 13, 2013.

Yu-Gi-Oh! 5D's Duel Transer (known as Yu-Gi-Oh! 5D's Master of the Cards in Europe) was released on April 21, 2011, and is a game for the Wii system that features over 4,500 cards and Wi-Fi multiplayer. This game came with promotional cards Fighter Ape, Closed Forest, and Roaring Earth, and a Duel Scanner accessory which allows players to scan their real-world cards into the game.

Yu-Gi-Oh! Online 3: Duel Accelerator was the 3rd installment of the Yu-Gi-Oh! Online series. It was based around Yu-Gi-Oh! 5D's. It was released on December 18, 2009, and was shut down on September 30, 2012, due to an internal decision by Konami.

On September 25, 2018, a 5D's World, alongside Synchro Summoning, was added to the mobile game Yu-Gi-Oh! Duel Links.

== Notes and references ==
=== Notes ===
- Though "5D's" stands for "5 Dragons", it has been incorrectly quoted as standing for "5 Dimensions" by 4Kids. V Jump magazine printed an issue explaining the correct interpretation.
