= V Jump =

Japanese manga magazine

- Cover of the December 2024 issue, featuring Dragon Ball Daima
- Editor-in-Chief: Daisuke Terashi
- Former editors: Kazuhiko Torishima
- Categories: Shōnen manga and video games
- Frequency: Monthly (since 1993); Semiannually (1990–1992)
- Circulation: 143,333; (July–September 2026)
- Publisher: Shueisha
- First issue: 1990 (extra edition); 1993 (regular edition)
- Country: Japan
- Based in: Tokyo
- Language: Japanese
- Website: vjump.shueisha.co.jp

V Jump (Japanese: Vジャンプ, Hepburn: Bui Janpu) is a Japanese shōnen manga magazine, focusing on manga as well as video games based on popular manga. The magazine's debut was in 1990 by Shueisha under the Jump line of magazines.

== History ==
In the early 1990s, Shueisha directed Weekly Shōnen Jump editor Kazuhiko Torishima to create V Jump as a children's magazine to compete with Shogakukan's CoroCoro Comic. Believing Shueisha was incapable of this because they lacked the experience and personal connections Shogakukan had, Torishima claims to have purposefully chosen a theme he knew would be unpopular for the third issue. He then received permission to re-launch the magazine with the new goal of containing manga, anime, and video game content all in one medium. Torishima later claimed to have predicted people being able to access all of these in one place like smartphones, and wanted to "get off the sinking ship" that was print manga magazines as soon as possible. He also wanted to begin promoting games while they were still in development, and personally went around to major game studios and asked them to publicize the names and faces of the individual creators. Torishima left Weekly Shōnen Jump to re-launch V Jump in 1992, and serve as its editor-in-chief. He also changed the meaning of the "V" in its title from "Victory", derived from the V sign, to "Virtual". Akira Toriyama designed the magazine's mascot character V Dragon (V龍), who was named via a reader poll.

Most of the manga serialized in V Jump are spin-offs of popular Weekly Shōnen Jump titles or adaptations of video games and anime. These include Yu-Gi-Oh! GX and Boruto. Original manga serialized in the magazine include Shadow Lady by Masakazu Katsura and Go! Go! Ackman by Toriyama. In November 2020, comedian Kendo Kobayashi was officially appointed an editor of V Jump.

== V Jump Books ==
V Jump Books is a line of V Jump manga and video game guides and some of the premiere editions. It mostly does guides for the series of Square Enix. It is the other publisher of Disney Books in Japan along with Kodansha since it published books and guides for the Kingdom Hearts games.

== Features ==
Most of the manga serialized in V Jump are spin-offs of popular Weekly Shōnen Jump titles, or adaptations of video games or anime.

=== Series ===
There are currently nine manga titles being regularly serialized in V Jump.

Series title	Author(s)	Premiered	Notes
Boruto: Two Blue Vortex (BORUTO -ボルト- -TWO BLUE VORTEX-)	Mikio Ikemoto, Masashi Kishimoto	August 2023	
Dragon Ball Super (ドラゴンボール超)	Akira Toriyama, Toyotarou	June 2015	On hiatus
Digimon World Re:Digitize Encode (デジモンワールド リ：デジタイズ エンコード)	Kōhei Fujino, Akiyoshi Hongō	April 2013	On hiatus
Dragon Quest: Dai no Daibouken – Yūsha Avan to Gokuen no Maō (ドラゴンクエスト ダイの大冒険 勇者アバンと獄炎の魔王)	Yusaku Shibata, Riku Sanjo	September 2020	
Inu Mayuge de Ikō (犬マユゲでいこう)	Ishizuka 2 Yūko	July 1994	
Metaphor: ReFantazio (メタファー：リファンタジオ)	Yoichi Amano, Atlus	January 2025	
N E O Shindō no "Puro" Rōōogu!! (N・E・Oシンドーの"プロ"ローーーーグ!!)	Kasaiyūji, N E O Shindō	March 2024	
Yu-Gi-Oh! OCG Stories (遊☆戯☆王OCGストーリーズ)	Naohito Miyoshi, Shin Yoshida	April 2022	
Yu-Gi-Oh! OCG Structures (遊☆戯☆王OCGストラクチャーズ)	Masashi Sato	June 2019	

=== Former series ===
- The Brief Return of Dr. Slump
- Combustible Campus Guardress
- Boruto: Naruto Next Generations
- Digimon Adventure V-Tamer 01
- Digimon Next
- Digimon Xros Wars
- Dragon Ball: Episode of Bardock
- Dragon Ball Heroes: Victory Mission
- Dragon Quest: Souten no Soura
- Dragon Quest Treasures: Another Adventure Fadora no Takarajima
- Dub & Peter 1
- Gaist Crusher First
- Go! Go! Ackman
- Haō Taikei Ryū Knight
- Kinnikuman II-Sei: All Chōjin Dai Shingeki
- Onmyō Taisenki
- Saint Seiya (last chapter only)
- Shadow Lady
- Slime MoriMori
- Soldier of Savings Cashman
- Viewtiful Joe
- Yu-Gi-Oh! GX
- Yu-Gi-Oh! R
- Yu-Gi-Oh! 5D's
- Yu-Gi-Oh! Zexal
- Yu-Gi-Oh! Arc-V
- Yu-Gi-Oh! Sevens
- Z/X: Code Reunion

== Circulation ==
Year / Period	Monthly circulation	Magazine sales	Sales revenue (est.)	Issue price
September 1998 to August 2003	149,833	8,989,980	¥4,944,489,000	¥550
September 2003 to August 2004	149,833	1,797,996	¥988,897,800	¥550
September 2004 to August 2005	178,334	2,140,008	¥1,177,004,400	¥550
September 2005 to September 2007	178,334	4,458,350	¥2,452,092,500	¥550
October 2007 to September 2008	366,667	4,400,004	¥2,420,002,200	¥550
October 2008 to September 2009	379,167	4,550,004	¥2,502,502,200	¥550
October 2009 to September 2010	391,667	4,700,004	¥2,585,002,200	¥550
October 2010 to September 2011	320,834	3,850,002	¥2,117,501,100	¥550
October 2011 to September 2012	302,500	3,630,000	¥1,996,500,000	¥550
October 2012 to September 2013	292,500	3,510,000	¥1,930,500,000	¥550
October 2013 to September 2014	252,500	3,030,000	¥1,666,500,000	¥550
October 2014 to September 2015	233,334	2,800,008	¥1,540,004,400	¥550
October 2015 to September 2016	258,333	3,099,996	¥1,704,997,800	¥550
October 2016 to September 2017	212,500	2,550,000	¥1,402,500,000	¥550
October 2017 to September 2018	187,500	2,250,000	¥1,237,500,000	¥550
October 2018 to March 2019	176,667	1,059,999	¥582,999,450	¥550
September 1998 to March 2019	230,026 (est.)	56,816,351	¥31,248,993,050 ($351.2 million)	¥550
