= Yu-Gi-Oh! Duel Monsters season 2 =

Season of television series

Yu-Gi-Oh! Rulers of the Duel (Yu-Gi-Oh! Battle City Duels)
- Season 2
- No. of episodes: 48

Release
- Original network: TV Tokyo
- Original release: April 10, 2001 – March 5, 2002

Season chronology
- ← Previous; Season 1 Next → Season 3

The second season of Yu-Gi-Oh! Duel Monsters, based on the manga by Kazuki Takahashi, premiered in Japan on April 10, 2001, and concluded on March 5, 2002, on TV Tokyo. The English adaptation of this season aired in the United States from November 16, 2002, and concluded on November 1, 2003, on Kids' WB. The season was directed by Kunihisa Sugishima, and written by Junki Takegami, Masashi Sogo, and Shin Yoshida.

This season follows Yugi and Joey as they compete in Seto Kaiba's Battle City tournament, which was organized in an attempt to gather the three Egyptian God Cards. However, Marik Ishtar, and his loyal Rare Hunter servants, also enter the tournament as part of his plan to use the power of the God cards to take over the world.

Between January 24 and December 28, 2004, Funimation released eleven DVD sets for the season under the title "Yu-Gi-Oh! Battle City Duels", containing episodes from the season. The complete season package was released on March 4, 2008. All DVDs were encoded in Region 1. The series was formerly licensed by 4Kids Entertainment in North America and other English-speaking territories, and was formerly distributed by FUNimation Entertainment, Ltd. on North American home video and also formerly distributed by Warner Bros. Television Animation thru North American television rights, when it aired on Kids' WB. It is now licensed and distributed by 4K Media.

== Cast and characters ==
=== Japanese ===
==== Regular ====
- Hidehiro Kikuchi as Hiroto Honda
- Hiroki Takahashi as Katsuya Jonouchi
- Kenjiro Tsuda as Seto Kaiba
- Maki Saitoh as Anzu Mazaki
- Shunsuke Kazama as Yugi Mutou/Yami Yugi

==== Recurring ====
- Haruhi Nanao as Mai Kujaku
- Junkoh Takeuchi as Mokuba Kaiba
- Konta as Rashid Ishtar
- Mika Sakenobe as Shizuka Kawai
- Rica Matsumoto as Ryo Bakura/Yami Bakura
- Ryou Naito as Ryuji Otogi
- Sumi Shimamoto as Isis Ishtar
- Tadashi Miyazawa as Sugoroku Mutou
- Tetsuya Iwanaga as Malik Ishtar

==== Guest stars ====
- Daisuke Namikawa as Ryouta Kajiki
- Eiji Takemoto as Takaido
- Hajime Komada as Bandit Keith Howard
- Kouji Ishii as Mask of Darkness
- Maiko Itou as Esper Roba
- Masami Suzuki as Ghost Kotsuzuka
- Norihisa Mori as Satake
- Sakura Nogawa as Isis Ishtar (child)
- Urara Takano as Insector Haga
- Yuu Mizushima as Mask of Light, Rare Hunter
- Yuuichi Nakamura as Dinosaur Ryuzaki

=== English ===
==== Regular ====
- Amy Birnbaum as Téa Gardner
- John Campbell as Tristan Taylor
- Wayne Grayson as Joseph "Joey" Wheeler
- Dan Green as Yugi Muto and Yami Yugi/The Pharaoh
- Eric Stuart as Seto Kaiba

==== Recurring ====
- Michael Alston Baley as Odion Ishtar
- Maddie Blaustein as Solomon Moto
- Megan Hollingshead as Mai Valentine
- Tara Jayne as Mokuba Kaiba
- Karen Neil as Ishizu Ishtar
- Lisa Ortiz as Serenity Wheeler
- Ted Lewis as Bakura Ryou/Yami Bakura
- J.T. Ross as Marik Ishtar
- Marc Thompson as Duke Devlin

==== Supporting ====
- Amy Birnbaum as Bonz
- Maddie Blaustein as Zygor
- Matt Charles as Umbra
- Ted Lewis as Bandit Keith
- Andrew Rannells as Mako Tsunami
- Sam Regal as Rex Raptor and Arkana
- Kayzie Rogers as Ishizu Ishtar (younger)
- Sebastian Arcelus as Espa Roba
- Eric Stuart as Sid
- Carter Cathcart as Lumis, Weevil Underwood

== Episode list ==
No. overall	No. in season	Title	Written by	Original release date	American air date
50	1	"The Mystery Duelist, Part 1"; Transliteration: "Challenge from the Past — The Terrifying Zera" (Japanese: 過去からの挑戦 戦慄のゼラ)	Junki Takegami	April 10, 2001	November 16, 2002
An arcane fortune teller steals the Millennium Puzzle and Yugi must defeat him in a duel to win it back! However, this is no ordinary soothsayer; he's a familiar and formidable foe from Duelist Kingdom... or is he? Can Yugi beat him all alone, without the help of his friends or the spirit inside the Puzzle?
51	2	"The Mystery Duelist, Part 2"; Transliteration: "The Shattered Millennium Puzzle" (Japanese: 砕かれた千年パズル)	Junki Takegami	April 17, 2001	November 16, 2002
The mysterious menace controlling Bandit Keith shatters the Millennium Puzzle into pieces before setting the dueling arena ablaze! Can Yugi put the Millennium Puzzle back together and save the spirit before the entire room is engulfed in flames? And is it possible with the dark spirit of Bakura's Millennium Ring determined to keep the Pharaoh from returning?
52	3	"The Past is Present"; Transliteration: "The Pharaoh's Lost Memories" (Japanese: 失われた王(ファラオ)の記憶)	Masashi Sogo	April 24, 2001	November 23, 2002
The origin of Duel Monsters is revealed! Using the magic of the Millennium Necklace, Egyptian historian Ishizu Ishtar shows Kaiba how Duel Monsters was played millennia ago in the form of Shadow Games! The ancient games have been resurrected in modern times, along with three almighty beasts of devastation – the Egyptian Gods, whose powers are far more powerful than Exodia! Now they are duel monster cards and when Ishizu gives Kaiba Obelisk The Tormentor, his greed for power overwhelms him and he is determined to get the legendary God Cards, even if it means destroying Yugi.
53	4	"Steppin' Out"; Transliteration: "The Fiery Dance Battle" (Japanese: 炎のダンスバトル)	Junki Takegami	May 1, 2001	November 23, 2002
The spirit of the Millennium Puzzle realizes that his memories of ancient Egypt have faded, but Téa is going to help him uncover the mysteries of his past! However, their search is interrupted by the dancing duelist Johnny Steps and his musical monsters of rock!
54	5	"Obelisk the Tormentor"; Transliteration: "This City Will Become Battle City!" (Japanese: この町は, バトルシティとなる!)	Shin Yoshida	May 8, 2001	November 30, 2002
To face the future, Yugi must first look into the past! Yugi learns that he was once a powerful Pharaoh who saved the world five thousand years ago, and he must now save the world again! Meanwhile, Kaiba tests the hidden powers of Obelisk against the fury of Blue-Eyes Ultimate Dragon with the revolutionary hologram technology of a new invention-the Duel Disk!
55	6	"Stalked by the Rare Hunters"; Transliteration: "Ghouls Attacks — Red-Eyes Black Dragon Targeted" (Japanese: グールズ強襲 狙われた真紅目黒竜)	Shin Yoshida	May 8, 2001	December 14, 2002
Joey is cornered by a group of sinister Rare Hunters who force him into a duel where if he loses, the Rare Hunters get his precious Red-Eyes Black Dragon! Though Joey pummels his foes with his mighty monster armada, eliminating life points isn't the only path to victory...
56	7	"Yugi VS the Rare Hunter, Part 1"; Transliteration: "Clash! Battle City Begins" (Japanese: 激闘! バトルシティ開幕)	Shin Yoshida	May 15, 2001	January 11, 2003
It's time to master new rules and monsters; let the Battle City Tournament commence! In the first duel of the tournament, Yugi challenges the Rare Hunter to win back Joey's Red-Eyes Black Dragon. However, Yugi's falling into the same trap that led to Joey's demise!
57	8	"Yugi VS the Rare Hunter, Part 2"; Transliteration: "Reversal — Chain Destruction" (Japanese: 逆転 連鎖破壊(チェーンディストラクション))	Shin Yoshida	May 22, 2001	January 18, 2003
Yugi figures out the Rare Hunter's strategy to summon the almighty Exodia, but it's too late to stop him! The Rare Hunter already has four pieces of Exodia in his hand, and the fifth and final piece is on top of his deck! How can Yugi stop Exodia?
58	9	"Espa Roba — The ESP Duelist, Part 1"; Transliteration: "Esper Roba — Terror of the Psychic Deck" (Japanese: エスパー絽場 サイキックデッキの恐怖)	Atsushi Maekawa	May 29, 2001	January 25, 2003
The psychic duelist Espa Roba defeats Rex Raptor as easy as a chumpasaurus, and Joey's next on his hit list! What chance does Joey have when Espa Roba has the telepathic ability to read all the cards in Joey's hand?
59	10	"Espa Roba — The ESP Duelist, Part 2"; Transliteration: "Gamble of Courage — The Spinning Roulette Spider" (Japanese: 勇気ある賭け 廻れルーレットスパイダー)	Atsushi Maekawa	June 5, 2001	February 1, 2003
Joey discovers that Espa Roba's extrasensory perception was a hoax, but he's not yet free from Espa's mental manipulations! Espa Roba's Jinzo not only slaughters all of Joey's monsters, but grows in power every turn! Joey's luck has come to an end... or has it?
60	11	"The Master of Magicians, Part 1"; Transliteration: "The Black Magician Master — Pandora" (Japanese: ブラックマジシャン使い パンドラ)	Junki Takegami	June 19, 2001	February 8, 2003
The magician duelist Arkana (Pandora in the Japanese version) transports Yami Yugi to the world's most lethal dueling arena, where the loser gets sent to the Shadow Realm! Yami Yugi must win this duel or he'll lose much more than his Dark Magician!
61	12	"The Master of Magicians, Part 2"; Transliteration: "Black Magic of the Soul" (Japanese: 魂のブラックマジック)	Junki Takegami	June 26, 2001	February 8, 2003
It's Dark Magician versus Dark Magician! However, while Yami Yugi only controls one Dark Magician, Arkana has three residing in his deck! Yami Yugi will never give up, as long as he believes in the Heart of the Cards!
62	13	"The Master of Magicians, Part 3"; Transliteration: "The Magician's Disciple — Black Magician Girl" (Japanese: 魔術師の弟子 ブラックマジシャンガール)	Junki Takegami	July 3, 2001	February 8, 2003
To counter Arkana's Dark Magician, Yugi pulls a rabbit out of his hat: the Dark Magician Girl! It's the battle of the sexes to determine the true master of magicians!
63	14	"Playing with a Parasite, Part 1"; Transliteration: "The Trap of Revenge — Rampage! Paraside" (Japanese: 復讐の罠 暴走! パラサイド)	Shin Yoshida	July 10, 2001	February 15, 2003
Old enemy Weevil Underwood lures Joey into a rigged duel. With a Parasite Paracide monster sneaked into Joey's deck, Weevil is able to block all of his monster's attacks and summon the Perfectly Ultimate Great Moth!
64	15	"Playing with a Parasite, Part 2"; Transliteration: "The Steel Knight — Gearfried" (Japanese: 鋼鉄の騎士 ギアフリード)	Shin Yoshida	July 17, 2001	February 22, 2003
Joey squashes Weevil's Moth, but Weevil has other tricks up his sleeves. He summons the all-powerful Insect Queen, which gains power from all of Joey's infected monsters and becomes practically invincible. Can Joey find a way to win?
65	16	"Mime Control, Part 1"; Transliteration: "Malik's Opening Play: The God Combo" (Japanese: マリク始動 神のコンボ)	Atsushi Maekawa	July 24, 2001	March 8, 2003
Yugi is challenged by Strings, Marik's mind-slave, who has a strong monster in his deck! Marik's summoning of the great beast seems assured when he calls forth Revival Jam.
66	17	"Mime Control, Part 2"; Transliteration: "Osiris the Heaven Dragon Saint Dragon – The God of Osiris" (Japanese: オシリスの天空竜 SAINT DRAGON -THE GOD OF OSIRIS)	Atsushi Maekawa	July 31, 2001	March 8, 2003
Marik summons Slifer The Sky Dragon and with his invincible combo, the dragon's attack power will increase! Yugi tries everything, but Marik's strategy seems infallible.
67	18	"Mime Control, Part 3"; Transliteration: "Overcoming God! The Ultimate Infinite Loop!" (Japanese: 神を越えろ! 究極の無限ループ)	Atsushi Maekawa	August 7, 2001	March 15, 2003
Yugi suddenly devises a strategy to defeat Slifer despite its overwhelming attack power. Will it work, or will Marik win and gain the Pharaoh's power?
68	19	"Legendary Fisherman, Part 1"; Transliteration: "Invisible Enemy — Sea Stealth II" (Japanese: 見えない敵 シーステルスII)	Shin Yoshida	August 14, 2001	March 22, 2003
Joey duels Mako Tsunami, unaware of the danger that Marik has prepared for him and Yugi's other friends... Marik arrives in Domino and allies himself with Yami Bakura.
69	20	"Legendary Fisherman, Part 2"; Transliteration: "The Legendary Fisherman" (Japanese: 伝説のフィッシャーマン)	Shin Yoshida	August 21, 2001	March 29, 2003
Mako summons the Legendary Fisherman, a monster protected by the ocean's power. Can Joey defeat it and claim victory? And even if he does, can he escape Marik's trap?
70	21	"Double Duel, Part 1"; Transliteration: "The Mask's Curse — The High Altitude Duel" (Japanese: 仮面の呪縛 高層デュエル)	Junki Takegami	August 28, 2001	May 3, 2003
Marik captures Joey, Téa and Mokuba, forcing Yami Yugi and Kaiba into a tag team duel with Lumis and Umbra, a pair of Rare Hunters with fantastic teamwork abilities, which unfortunately, Yami Yugi and Kaiba seem to lack.
71	22	"Double Duel, Part 2"; Transliteration: "Sealed God Cards" (Japanese: 封じられた神のカード)	Junki Takegami	September 4, 2001	May 10, 2003
Lumis and Umbra prevent the summoning of all high-level monsters with their Mask of Restrict card, while they summon the powerful Masked Beast, but even in spite of all this, Kaiba is highly reluctant to work together with Yami Yugi.
72	23	"Double Duel, Part 3"; Transliteration: "Unite!" (Japanese: 結束せよ!)	Junki Takegami	September 11, 2001	May 17, 2003
As Yami Yugi and Kaiba finally pull together a semblance of teamwork, and their enemies' team spirit begins to crumble, Lumis takes things into his own hands and summons the Masked Beast Des Gardius, a monster even more powerful than Kaiba's Blue-Eyes. Meanwhile, Téa helps Mokuba escape the Rare Hunters in order to get help for her and Joey.
73	24	"Double Duel, Part 4"; Transliteration: "The Giant God Soldier of Obelisk The God of Obelisk" (Japanese: オベリスクの巨神兵 THE GOD OF OBELISK)	Junki Takegami	September 18, 2001	May 24, 2003
Yugi and Kaiba finally overcome and defeat Lumis and Umbra with Valkyrion the Magna Warrior and Obelisk The Tormentor, but Marik still has Joey and Téa...
74	25	"The Rescue"; Transliteration: "Bonds" (Japanese: 絆)	Junki Takegami	September 25, 2001	June 14, 2003
As they head via helicopter to Marik's hideout, Yugi and Kaiba discuss the events of the past. Meanwhile, Téa and Joey are brainwashed by Marik as a part of his diabolical plan to lure Yugi into a deadly and inescapable trap.
75	26	"Friends 'Til the End, Part 1"; Transliteration: "A Cruel Duel — Yugi Vs. Jonouchi" (Japanese: 非情の決闘(デュエル) 遊戯vs城之内)	Atsushi Maekawa	October 2, 2001	June 28, 2003
With Joey under Marik's mind control, Yugi is forced to duel his best friend in a twisted timed match where only one will survive! To add more sadism, Tea is trapped in a chair and the duel can only stop at the cost of her life.
76	27	"Friends 'Til the End, Part 2"; Transliteration: "Awaken! Red-Eyes Black Dragon of Friendship" (Japanese: 届け!友情の真紅眼の黒竜(レッドアイズブラックドラゴン))	Atsushi Maekawa	October 9, 2001	July 5, 2003
Yugi chooses to duel himself, with Tea's aid rather than the Pharaoh's and summons Joey's Red-Eyes Black Dragon, hoping to break Marik's mind control over Joey. When that fails, he gives Joey the Millennium Puzzle in the hopes of trying to save him. Meanwhile, Tristan and Serenity are chased and pursued by the Rare Hunters.
77	28	"Friends 'Til the End, Part 3"; Transliteration: "The Countdown to Despair" (Japanese: 絶望へのカウントダウン)	Atsushi Maekawa	October 16, 2001	July 12, 2003
An enraged Marik finds his mind controlling hold over Joey slowly slipping, which leads to a weakened Red-Eyes still surviving and Yugi managing a lead, but when Marik draws Meteor of Destruction, all hope seems lost. Back in Battle City, Serenity and Tristan are saved from the Rare Hunters by Duke Devlin and Mai Valentine, with the latter driving them to the location of the duel between Yugi and Joey.
78	29	"Friends 'Til the End, Part 4"; Transliteration: "Attack Me! The Fated Last Turn" (Japanese: ボクを撃て!運命のラストターン)	Atsushi Maekawa	October 23, 2001	July 19, 2003
Tea is rescued from her trap and Joey finally breaks free of Marik's mind control, only to find to his horror that Yugi plans to lose the duel and give up his life so that Joey can escape. How will both of them survive?
79	30	"Shadow of a Duel"; Transliteration: "Ghost Deck Vs. Occult Deck" (Japanese: ゴーストデッキvsオカルトデッキ)	Shin Yoshida	October 30, 2001	August 16, 2003
To fulfill his plot with Marik, Yami Bakura forcibly enters the tournament. After taking control of a badly injured Bakura (who was in the hospital in a coma after being attacked by his evil self), he looks for some locator cards and finds the perfect victims in the form of Bonz and his gang...
80	31	"Lights, Camera, Duel"; Transliteration: "Ninja Master Magnum Enters" (Japanese: 忍者使(ニンジャマスター)いマグナム見参)	Junki Takegami	November 6, 2001	August 23, 2003
Before they arrive at the Battle City Finals, Mai is challenged by Hollywood star Jean Claude Magnum, who plans to gain Mai's hand in marriage after he defeats her in a duel. Will her Harpies be able to stand up against his Ninjas?
81	32	"Let the Finals Begin!"; Transliteration: "Battle Ship Takes Off!" (Japanese: バトルシップ発進!)	Junki Takegami	November 13, 2001	August 30, 2003
The Battle City Finals draw to a beginning with triple deception; Marik's servant Odion is assuming his name as Marik acts like a friend to Yugi and co. under the false identity of Namu as Yami Bakura plans to enter with Bakura as his pawn. Yugi and the Pharaoh make the difficult decision to put Slifer in their deck, entering the battle to save the world.
82	33	"The Dark Spirit Revealed, Part 1"; Transliteration: "First Duel in the Sky — Yugi vs. Dark Bakura" (Japanese: 天空のファーストデュエル 遊戯vs闇の獏良)	Atsushi Maekawa	November 27, 2001	September 6, 2003
Yami Bakura reveals himself, but seems to be no great duelist. He loses nearly all of his life points, even when he summons the powerful Dark Necrofear. What exactly is he planning?
83	34	"The Dark Spirit Revealed, Part 2"; Transliteration: "The Death-Calling Ouija Board" (Japanese: 死を呼ぶウィジャ盤)	Atsushi Maekawa	November 27, 2001	September 13, 2003
Yami Bakura calls forth the terrifying Dark Sanctuary, activated when Yami Yugi sent Dark Necrofear to the Graveyard, which is capable of possessing one of Yugi's monsters each turn. While Yugi tries to find a way around this, Yami Bakura calls forth the Destiny Board, which will destroy all monsters on Yugi's side of the field should it truly succeed from within its full activation...
84	35	"The Dark Spirit Revealed, Part 3"; Transliteration: "Smash the Darkness – God Attacks!" (Japanese: 闇を砕け 神の一撃!)	Atsushi Maekawa	November 27, 2001	September 13, 2003
Yugi finally overcomes Yami Bakura's tactics when he summons Slifer the Sky Dragon, but Marik plots to make him face a difficult decision when he persuades Yami Bakura to release control of a badly injured Bakura: would Yami Yugi rather save the world or risk harming a friend? However, Yami Bakura decides not to take the risk, since he needs Bakura in good health, because Bakura is the holder of the Millennium Ring and the host for Yami Bakura's spirit. As a result, Yami Bakura regains control, much to Marik's shock, which allows Yami Yugi to follow through with his attack and win the duel, once again leaving the good Bakura in a coma. While taking care of Bakura, Yugi and Joey realize his Millennium Ring is missing.
85	36	"Rage of the Egyptian Gods"; Transliteration: "Hidden Power – The Purpose of the God Cards" (Japanese: 秘められた力 神のカードの謎)	Junki Takegami	December 4, 2001	September 20, 2003
Yugi meets Shadi again, who relates the history of the legendary Egyptian God Cards and the terrible power they possess. Afterwards, Shadi uses his Millennium Key to cloak his presence as he checks up on Bakura, while Marik is revealed to have temporarily retaken control of Téa's mind to take Bakura's Millennium Ring, in order to gain a leverage over Yami Bakura.
86	37	"Awakening of Evil, Part 1"; Transliteration: "Jounouchi Vs the Trap Deck" (Japanese: 城之内vsトラップデッキ!)	Shin Yoshida	December 11, 2001	September 20, 2003
Joey duels Odion (who has taken Marik's name), but quickly falls behind when he faces Odion's powerful traps. When Joey attempts to take advantage of his deck's weakness (having no monsters), Odion pulls out a surprise!
87	38	"Awakening of Evil, Part 2"; Transliteration: "The Spirit-Inheriting Card — Psycho Shocker Counterattacks!" (Japanese: 受け継ぎし魂(カード) サイコショッカー反撃!)	Shin Yoshida	December 18, 2001	September 27, 2003
Joey summons Jinzo and devastates Odion by disabling all of his traps, but when Joey summons his most powerful monsters, Odion calls forth the deadly Mystical Beast of Serket!
88	39	"Awakening of Evil, Part 3"; Transliteration: "Summon the Winged Sun Dragon of Ra" (Japanese: ラーの翼神竜を召喚せよ)	Shin Yoshida	December 25, 2001	September 27, 2003
As Odion's Mystical Beast of Serket destroys Joey's monsters one by one, he is impressed by the friendship Joey shares with the others, and recounts his and Marik's own dark history; revealing himself to be Marik's older, adoptive brother who was mistreated by their father for not being a true member of the tomb keepers, and that he dedicated his life to protecting his brother from his inner evil.
89	40	"Awakening of Evil, Part 4"; Transliteration: "Ra's Fury — Stand up Jonouchi!" (Japanese: ラーの怒り 立て! 城之内)	Shin Yoshida	January 8, 2002	October 4, 2003
The counterfeit Ra knocks out Odion and Joey and Kaiba decides the winner will be whoever stands up first. Joey manages to stand first, allowing him to win the duel. Before passing out, Odion reveals his real identity and cryptically warns Joey that they will all now be in worse danger. Odion's lapse into unconsciousness allows Marik's evil half, Yami Marik, to surface and take control of Marik's body, since Marik needs Odion to help restrain his dark side.
90	41	"Mind Game, Part 1"; Transliteration: "Mai vs. Marik — A Dark Duel" (Japanese: 舞vsマリク 闇のデュエル)	Shin Yoshida	January 15, 2002	October 4, 2003
Mai goes up against Yami Marik, an even more malicious counterpart of Marik. Though Mai gains an early lead, Yami Marik soon creates a Shadow Game; as Mai's monsters are destroyed, so too are her personal memories of her friends...
91	42	"Mind Game, Part 2"; Transliteration: "Capturing the God Card" (Japanese: 神のカードを奪え)	Shin Yoshida	January 22, 2002	October 11, 2003
Thanks to some strong and emotional support and encouragement from Yugi and his friends, Mai attempts to stand up and fight back against Yami Marik's mind torture towards her, leading to Mai stealing The Winged Dragon of Ra from his deck via a dueling strategy, but the monster can only be summoned by reciting the card's ancient text...
92	43	"Mind Game, Part 3"; Transliteration: "Mystery of the Hieratic Text" (Japanese: 古代神官文字の謎)	Shin Yoshida	January 29, 2002	October 11, 2003
Yami Marik recites the ancient text and summons Ra. With his victory, he banishes Mai to the Shadow Realm, where he plans to torture her for all of eternity...
93	44	"A Duel with Destiny, Part 1"; Transliteration: "Kaiba Vs. The 8th Duelist" (Japanese: 海馬vs8人目のデュエリスト)	Tadashi Hayakawa	February 5, 2002	October 18, 2003
Kaiba duels against the mysterious eighth duelist, who is soon revealed to be Ishizu, and she, in turn, is revealed to be Marik's elder sister. She plans to take Obelisk the Tormentor back and save her brother from himself, as her Millennium Necklace shows her, and plants a trap in the midst of Kaiba's arrogance during their duel. While trying to call out to his sister, Marik is banished from his own body by the evil force controlling him.
94	45	"A Duel with Destiny, Part 2"; Transliteration: "An Attack that Changes the Future" (Japanese: 未来を変える一撃)	Tadashi Hayakawa	February 12, 2002	October 18, 2003
As Kaiba summons Obelisk, he is unaware of the trap Ishizu has implanted within the monster, which will destroy him when he attacks, but Kaiba soon has an unexpected vision in the midst of the duel, which goes against Ishizu's own predictions...
95	46	"The Tomb-Keeper's Secret"; Transliteration: "The Truth of the Ishtar Family Revealed" (Japanese: 明かされるイシュタール家の真実)	Shin Yoshida	February 19, 2002	October 25, 2003
Ishizu gives Yugi her Millennium Necklace and recounts the story of the Ishtar family, finally revealing the past tragedy that gave birth to Marik's evil side. After everyone goes to sleep, Marik (who finally discovered the truth while lurking in Téa's mind) uses Téa to deliver the spirits of Yami Bakura and himself into Bakura's body and confronts his evil half.
96	47	"Showdown in the Shadows, Part 1"; Transliteration: "Darkness Vs. Darkness" (Japanese: 闇 Vs. 闇)	Atsushi Maekawa	February 26, 2002	October 25, 2003
With the "good" Marik aiding him, Yami Bakura duels Yami Marik. Using Marik's knowledge of The Winged Dragon of Ra, Bakura steals it and plans to summon it. However, Yami Marik seems quite unconcerned about the current turn of events.
97	48	"Showdown in the Shadows, Part 2"; Transliteration: "One Turn Kill" (Japanese: ONE TURN KILL)	Atsushi Maekawa	March 5, 2002	November 1, 2003
Yami Marik uses Joyful Doom to reduce Ra's attack points to 0. When the beast is destroyed, he revives it, and then, Yami Marik uses the previously unknown abilities to defeat Bakura and Marik. Yami Bakura is sent inside the maze of the Pharaoh's mind, and plans on unlocking the Pharaoh's secret. Upon realizing that the innocent good Bakura was also sent to the Shadow Realm, an enraged Yami Yugi confronts Yami Marik and vows to defeat him. Marik temporarily takes over Téa's body again to warn Ishizu about his evil half's plans.

== DVD releases ==
Volume	Discs	Episodes	Region 1 release
1: The Mystery Duelist	1	4	January 27, 2004
2: Obelisk the Tormentor	1	3	January 27, 2004
3: The ESP Duelist	1	3	April 6, 2004
4: The Master of Magicians	1	5	April 6, 2004
5: Mime Control	1	5	June 1, 2004
6: Double Duel	1	5	June 1, 2004
7: Friends 'til the End	1	5	July 27, 2004
8: The Dark Spirit Revealed	1	5	September 28, 2004
9: Awakening of Evil	1	5	November 16, 2004
10: Mind Game	1	4	November 16, 2004
11: Showdown in the Shadows	1	4	December 28, 2004
Complete Second Season	7	48	March 4, 2008
