= Yu-Gi-Oh! Duel Monsters season 4 =

Yu-Gi-Oh! Waking the Dragons
- Season 4
- No. of episodes: 40

Release
- Original network: TV Tokyo
- Original release: February 18 – December 17, 2003

Season chronology
- ← Previous; Season 3 Next → Season 5

The fourth season of Yu-Gi-Oh! Duel Monsters, created by Kazuki Takahashi, was broadcast in Japan on TV Tokyo from February 18 to December 17, 2003. In the United States, the season was broadcast under the subtitle Waking the Dragons, and aired from September 11, 2004, to May 28, 2005, on Kids' WB. This season aired at the same time that the Millennium World chapters were being written, which would later become Season 5.

The season follows an original story arc in-which Dartz, using the magic of the Orichalcos stones, and his three servants – Alister, Rafael, and Valon — bring chaos to the world. Yugi, Joey, and Kaiba face off against the Orichalcos using three legendary dragon cards from the monster world.

The first 28 episodes of the season were released in three DVD volumes between December 2005 and April 2008 through Funimation. The season was fully released on DVD and digital format on March 25, 2014, through Cinedigm, after striking a deal with 4K Media Inc. The fourth season was formerly licensed by 4Kids Entertainment in North America and other English-speaking countries and territories, and was formerly distributed by FUNimation Productions, LTD. on Region 1 home video and also distributed by Warner Bros. Television Animation through US television rights, when it aired on Kids' WB!, also in North America. It is now licensed and distributed by Konami Cross Media NY, Inc.

== Cast and characters ==
=== Japanese ===
==== Regular ====
- Hidehiro Kikuchi as Hiroto Honda
- Hiroki Takahashi as Katsuya Jonouchi
- Kenjiro Tsuda as Seto Kaiba
- Maki Saitoh as Anzu Mazaki
- Shunsuke Kazama as Yugi Moto/Yami Yugi

==== Recurring ====
- Yukishige Iemura as Amelda
- Yuu Emaou as Dartz
- Ryou Naito as Ryuji Otogi
- Saburo Kodaka as Arthur Hopkins
- Kaori Tagami as Rebecca Hopkins
- Yusaku Yara as Ironheart
- Junkoh Takeuchi as Mokuba Kaiba
- Chieko Higuchi as Kuriso (Kris)
- Tadashi Miyazawa as Sugoroku Mutou
- Jiro Takasugi as Pegasus J. Crawford
- Yoshihisa Kawahara as Raphael
- Yuuichi Nakamura as Dinosaur Ryuzaki
- Urara Takano as Insector Haga
- Haruhi Nanao as Mai Kujaku
- Takeshi as Varon

=== English ===
==== Regular ====
- Amy Birnbaum as Téa Gardner
- John Campbell as Tristan Taylor
- Wayne Grayson as Joey Wheeler
- Dan Green as Yugi Muto/Yami Yugi
- Eric Stuart as Seto Kaiba

==== Recurring ====
- Ted Lewis as Alister
- Wayne Grayson as Dartz
- Marc Thompson as Duke Devlin, Rafael, and Valon
- Mike Pollock as Arthur Hawkins and Gurimo
- Kerry Williams as Rebecca Hawkins
- Brian Maillard as Ironheart
- Veronica Taylor as Chris
- Tara Jayne as Mokuba Kaiba
- Maddie Blaustein as Solomon Muto
- Darren Dunstan as Maximillion Pegasus
- Anthony Salerno as Rex Raptor
- Jimmy Zoppi as Weevil Underwood
- Bella Hudson as Mai Valentine

== Home media ==
Between December 2005 and April 2008, Funimation Productions released the first 28 episodes of the season over three volumes of DVDs, each containing 7-9 episodes. In late 2013, Cinedigm and 4K Media Inc. reached a distribution agreement that would result in the release of every episode from the Yu-Gi-Oh! franchise on DVD and Blu-ray and to digital retailers. The complete fourth season, titled Yu-Gi-Oh! Classic: Season 4, was released on March 25, 2014, on DVD. It was also released in two volumes, like the previous seasons, on the same day both digitally and on DVD.

== Episode list ==
No. overall	No. in season	Title	Written by	Original release date	American air date
145	1	"A New Evil – Part 1"; Transliteration: "The Pulsation of a New Darkness" (Japanese: 新たなる闇の鼓動)	Shin Yoshida	February 18, 2003	September 11, 2004
Duel monsters are becoming real and Kaiba's company receives the blame. Meanwhile, Yugi takes the Egyptian god cards to the museum to gain more answers about Yami's past, but a dark force steals energy from the cards. The cards are later stolen by Gurimo and his team of bikers, the members of which possess the Seal of Orichalcos. Yugi challenges Gurimo to a duel for the Egyptian God Cards.
146	2	"A New Evil – Part 2"; Transliteration: "The Seal of Orichalcos" (Japanese: オレイカルコスの結界)	Shin Yoshida	February 25, 2003	September 18, 2004
Yugi is almost overpowered by the Seal of Orichalcos' effects and Obelisk the Tormentor. He turns the duel around and manages to win, causing Gurimo's soul to be taken by the Seal of Orichalcos, but not before he manages to toss the god cards to his trio of bikers. Yugi and the others go to Arthur and Rebecca Hawkins for more help.
147	3	"Legend of the Dragons"; Transliteration: "Nameless Dragon — Timaeus" (Japanese: 名もなき竜 ティマイオス)	Shin Yoshida	March 4, 2003	September 25, 2004
Yugi and the Pharaoh are taken to the "Duel Monsters Spirit World", where they find three dragons frozen in crystal. Warned by Dark Magician Girl of Hades and how it will return to destroy the world, Yugi and the Pharaoh manage to release one of the dragons, Timaeus, and form a bond with it.
148	4	"The Creator Returns"; Transliteration: "The Invitation from Pegasus" (Japanese: ペガサスからの招待状)	Akemi Omode	March 11, 2003	October 2, 2004
Yugi, Joey, Tristan and Téa are warned by Pegasus of a new threat, prompting them to travel to Industrial Illusions to find out more. Meanwhile, Dartz sends an unlikely mercenary (Mai Valentine) to capture Pegasus's soul. Kaiba learns that his company shares are being bought out by Pegasus, who challenges him to a duel.
149	5	"Deja Duel! – Part 1"; Transliteration: "The Nightmare of Toon World" (Japanese: トゥーンワールドの悪夢)	Akihiko Inari	March 18, 2003	October 9, 2004
Kaiba and Mokuba go to Duelist Kingdom Island for Kaiba and Pegasus's duel. Kaiba senses something strange about the duel and Pegasus, and soon learns that someone else is involved.
150	6	"Deja Duel! – Part 2"; Transliteration: "Awaken! Critias" (Japanese: 目覚めよ! クリティウス)	Akihiko Inari	April 8, 2003	October 16, 2004
Alister reveals himself, as well as his intentions for Kaiba, while locking him in the Seal of Orichalcos. The duel ends in a draw. Meanwhile, Yugi, Tea, Joey and Tristan prepare for their flight to Industrial Illusions.
151	7	"An Unexpected Enemy"; Transliteration: "An Unexpected Enemy" (Japanese: 予期せぬ敵)	Atsushi Maekawa	April 15, 2003	October 23, 2004
Yugi and the others are left stranded in the desert and surrounded by a gang of bikers. They are later saved by a mysterious female biker, later revealed to be Mai Valentine. They arrive at Pegasus's headquarters, only to be cornered by Mai, who has joined Dartz's team and challenges Joey to a duel.
152	8	"My Freaky Valentine – Part 1"; Transliteration: "Mai who Fell into Darkness" (Japanese: 闇に堕ちた舞)	Akemi Omode	April 22, 2003	October 23, 2004
Mai confesses her reason for joining Dartz's team and overpowers Joey with her enhanced deck and the Seal of Orichalcos. Joey is forced to decide how to carry on with the duel.
153	9	"My Freaky Valentine – Part 2"; Transliteration: "Revive! The Third Dragon" (Japanese: よみがえれ! 第三の竜)	Akemi Omode	April 29, 2003	October 30, 2004
Mai continues to overpower Joey with her Harpie Ladies and the Seal. However, Joey is transported to the Dominion of the Beasts, where he releases the third dragon, Hermos.
154	10	"My Freaky Valentine – Part 3"; Transliteration: "The Miracle of Hermos" (Japanese: ヘルモスの奇跡)	Akemi Omode, Yasuyuki Suzuki	May 6, 2003	October 30, 2004
Joey makes a comeback with the Claw of Hermos and nearly wins against Mai. Valon decides to step in and break the seal, causing the duel to end in a draw. Kaiba arrives at the Headquarters, and the group finds a digital message left by Pegasus. Pegasus warns them about the Great Leviathan and leaves them a card that can be used against Dartz.
155	11	"The Challenge"; Transliteration: "Target: Nameless Pharaoh" (Japanese: ターゲットは名もなき王(ファラオ))	Yasuyuki Suzuki	May 13, 2003	November 6, 2004
The group heads off to find Professor Hawkins, only to discover he has been kidnapped by Rafael. Yugi leaves in the middle of the night to face Rafael alone. Meanwhile, Rex and Weevil follow Yugi to see his duel.
156	12	"Fate of the Pharaoh – Part 1"; Transliteration: "Yugi vs. Rafael — The Impregnable Guardian Deck" (Japanese: 遊戯vsラフェール 鉄壁のガーディアンデッキ)	Shin Yoshida	May 20, 2003	November 6, 2004
Rafael and Yami Yugi face off in a duel. Rafael reveals his past and his reasons for joining Dartz's team.
157	13	"Fate of the Pharaoh — Part 2"; Transliteration: "The Truth of Doma" (Japanese: ドーマの真実)	Shin Yoshida	May 27, 2003	November 13, 2004
Rafael maintains his lead over Yami Yugi in the duel, while accusing him of being an evil Pharaoh responsible for the chaos in the world. He gives Yami Yugi the Seal of Orichalcos when Rafael plays the Exchange spell card. Initially hesitant to use the Seal of Orichalcos, Yami Yugi plays it when he appears to be a turn away from losing, against Yugi's advice. This causes Yugi's spirit to be imprisoned in an Orichalcos prison, and it also lets Yami Yugi's inner darkness to consume him.
158	14	"Fate of the Pharaoh – Part 3"; Transliteration: "The Darkness Within Yugi — Timaeus Disappears" (Japanese: 遊戯の中の闇 ティマイオス消滅)	Shin Yoshida	June 3, 2003	November 13, 2004
Under the influence of the Orichalcos, Yami Yugi ruthlessly attacks Rafael, using Catapult Turtle to sacrifice his monsters in order to drain Rafael's life points and gains the upper hand. However, when Rafael summons his ace monster, Guardian Eatos, his ultimate trap comes to light; he has unlocked Yami Yugi's inner darkness, which caused him to duel recklessly, and he manages to turn the Pharaoh's own monsters against him, using Guardian Eatos's effects. This causes Guardian Eatos to gain attack points equal to the total attack points of all the monsters in Yami Yugi's Graveyard, allowing Eatos to power up to 10,000 attack points. When Eatos attacks, Yami Yugi loses the duel and almost has his soul taken, but Yugi uses the Millenium Puzzle to destroy his prison and steps in to save Yami Yugi. This causes Yugi's soul to be taken instead, devastating the Pharaoh. Meanwhile, Rex and Weevil jump onto Rafael's helicopter to join up with Dartz's team, in order to obtain the power of the Orichalcos.
159	15	"Trial by Stone"; Transliteration: "A Taken Soul" (Japanese: 引きさかれた魂(ソウル))	Shin Yoshida	June 10, 2003	November 20, 2004
After Yugi sacrifices his soul to save Yami, the gang decides to seek out Dartz's headquarters. They ask Kaiba to give them a ride, but he is enraged that Yugi lost to someone other than him. Meanwhile, Rex and Weevil join Dartz and gain the power of the Orichalcos.
160	16	"On the Wrong Track – Part 1"; Transliteration: "The Runaway Train Duel" (Japanese: 暴走特急デュエル)	Atsushi Maekawa	June 24, 2003	November 20, 2004
Yami and the rest of his friends take a train to get to the airport but the ride is interrupted when the group is separated. Rex challenges Joey to a duel, while Weevil goes up against Yami. Rex and Weevil both use the Seal of Orichalcos against their opponents.
161	17	"On the Wrong Track — Part 2"; Transliteration: "Power-Up Deck! Haga & Ryuzaki" (Japanese: パワーアップデッキ! 羽蛾&竜崎)	Atsushi Maekawa	June 24, 2003	November 27, 2004
Without Yugi by his side to support him, Yami loses faith and is losing to Weevil. Joey struggles against Rex's enhanced deck until he uses his Red-Eyes Black Dragon and Metalmorph combo. Note: This episode and "On the Wrong Track — Part 1" aired in Japan as a one-hour special.
162	18	"On the Wrong Track – Part 3"; Transliteration: "Timaiosu Hatsudō Sezu" (Japanese: ティマイオス発動せず)	Atsushi Maekawa	July 1, 2003	November 27, 2004
Joey plays Release Restraint on Gearfried the Iron Knight to summon Gearfried the Swordmaster, then fuses Hermos and Red-Eyes Black Dragon into Red-Eyes Black Dragon Sword to win the duel against Rex. Meanwhile, Yami is having trouble defeating Weevil without Timaeus, who has seemingly deserted him after Yugi's sacrifice. Weevil plays a cruel trick on Yami, who responds by ruthlessly discarding monsters and attacking Weevil repeatedly with Breaker the Magical Warrior long after the duel has ended; shortly after, the train falls off the edge of a cliff... Note: The scene where Yami furiously attacks Weevil repeatedly becomes an Internet meme.
163	19	"Self Destruction"; Transliteration: "Confrontation! Two Yugis" (Japanese: 対決! 二人の遊戯)	Shin Yoshida	July 8, 2003	January 29, 2005
Yami and Téa awake after their sojourn from the train and are found by a sage named Ironheart who is Dartz's father and former King of Atlantis, his granddaughter Chris who is Dartz's daughter, and their dog Sky. Yami asks Ironheart to hold on to the Eye of Timaeus until he feels ready to use it again, since it wouldn't work for him in his last duel. In an attempt to rescue Yugi, Yami enters the valley where lost souls come. He enters a circle containing Yugi's soul and tries to get him back, but Yugi angrily challenges him to duel. There, Yugi uses the same strategy that Yami used in his duel with Rafael, and activates the Seal of Orichalcos, much to Yami's dismay. But in the end, Yami does the right thing and defeats Yugi, therefore defeating the darkness within him.
164	20	"Reliving the Past"; Transliteration: "Orichalcos Soldier" (Japanese: オレイカルコス•ソルジャー)	Shin Yoshida	July 22, 2003	January 29, 2005
As Yami Yugi's emotions surface in the circle, Dartz summons a creature called Orichalcos Gigas to attack him. Despite his most valiant efforts, Yami Yugi can't defeat it. Every time he destroys it, it comes back stronger. Ironheart, Chris and Skye sacrifice themselves so that Timaeus can rejoin the Pharaoh. The Pharaoh wins, and he and Téa go in search of Joey and Tristan. Meanwhile, Joey and Tristan carry Rex's body, when suddenly an explosion occurs up ahead.
165	21	"Deck of Armor"; Transliteration: "Valon Moves! The Mysterious Armor Deck" (Japanese: ヴァロン始動! 謎のアーマーデッキ)	Yasuyuki Suzuki	July 29, 2003	February 5, 2005
Duke and Rebecca are about to reunite with Yami and the gang when they run into Mai and Valon. In order to prove himself to Mai, Valon accepts Rebecca's invitation to duel. Duke enters the fray as well. Despite their best efforts, Valon's mysterious Armor deck ultimately proves too strong to handle and they lose the duel, but are spared because Valon doesn't bother to use the Seal of Oricalcos on them. Meanwhile, Yugi, Joey, Tristan and Téa are close to meeting up with each other, while Kaiba and Mokuba head out on their private plane.
166	22	"Flight of Fear – Part 1"; Transliteration: "The Revenging Amelda — The Duel in Heaven" (Japanese: 復讐のアメルダ 大空中決闘)	Yasuyuki Suzuki	August 12, 2003	February 5, 2005
Alister has returned to finally get his revenge against Kaiba. He challenges him to a duel on Kaiba's plane. The two of them face off in a duel and Alister plays the Seal of Orichalcos. Kaiba refuses to take responsibility for what his father has done, and Alister shows Kaiba a vision of his past. Meanwhile, the Seal of Orichalcos short-circuits the plane and Mokuba takes the controls to keep them in the air.
167	23	"Flight of Fear – Part 2"; Transliteration: "Sky Fortress Ziggurat" (Japanese: 天空の要塞 ジグラート)	Yasuyuki Suzuki	August 19, 2003	February 12, 2005
The duel between Alister and Kaiba continues, with Alister summoning his powerful Air Fortress Ziggurat. Meanwhile, Mokuba is having trouble controlling the airplane, narrowly escaping a collision with a mountain. Eventually, Roland arrives to help out. Kaiba fuses the Fang of Critias with Tyrant Wing and Blue-Eyes White Dragon to form Blue-Eyes Tyrant Dragon and win the duel against Alister. Critias, Hermos and Timaeus appear and help Kaiba land the plane safely where the Pharaoh and his friends are waiting. Meanwhile, Dartz manages to buy out the rest of Kaiba's company, making him the owner of KaibaCorp. Note: This episode and "Paradise Found" aired in Japan as a one-hour special.
168	24	"Paradise Found"; Transliteration: "The Shadow of Dartz Creeps Near" (Japanese: 忍びよるダーツの影)	Shin Yoshida	August 19, 2003	February 12, 2005
Kaiba's company has been completely taken over by Dartz and Dartz brags to Rafael that Alister's soul was taken. Kaiba and Yami break into KaibaCorp headquarters to get info off of the company's hard drive and end up fighting off an army of monsters. Rebecca hacks into the security system to help them out. The Seal of Orichalcos is revealed to be the symbol of the "Paradias Organization", of which Dartz is the leader. Joey runs off to Paradius headquarters to find Mai, while Tristan and Téa chase after him. Note: This episode and "Flight of Fear — Part 2" aired in Japan as a one-hour special.
169	25	"Fighting for a Friend – Part 1"; Transliteration: "Clash! Jonouchi vs. Valon" (Japanese: 激突! 城之内vsヴァロン)	Akemi Omode	September 2, 2003	February 19, 2005
Joey chases after Valon and challenges him to a duel. Tristan follows Joey, only to be cornered by Dartz's Orichalcos soldier. Yami, Kaiba and the gang are stopped by an army of Orichalcos soldiers.
170	26	"Fighting for a Friend – Part 2"; Transliteration: "Fullarmor Gravitation" (Japanese: フルアーマー•グラビテーション)	Akemi Omode	September 9, 2003	February 19, 2005
Joey and Valon continue their duel, while Yami and Kaiba fight off the Orichalcos soldiers. Kaiba and Mokuba leave the others to search for Dartz. Rebecca hacks into the KaibaCorp system to find Joey, while Mai continues searching for him to exact her revenge.
171	27	"Fighting for a Friend – Part 3"; Transliteration: "Reverberating Soul" (Japanese: 響きあう魂)	Akemi Omode	September 16, 2003	February 26, 2005
Rebecca locates Joey; Yami, Téa and Tristan go after him. However, Mai finds Joey and Valon first. Joey uses the Claw of Hermos card to gain an advantage, but Valon overpowers it. Joey uses his Red-Eyes Black Dragon to create armor for himself and combat Valon's strategy, resulting in a clash of monster armors.
172	28	"Fighting for a Friend — Part 4"; Transliteration: "The End of the Fierce Battle" (Japanese: 激闘の果てに)	Akemi Omode	September 23, 2003	February 26, 2005
Valon uses Phoenix Gravitation to revive his armor, but Joey is able to revive Hermos, overpowering Valon and winning the duel. Valon's soul is taken by the Orichalcos, but not before he realizes what he had done was wrong. As Dartz shows low concern for Valon's defeat, Joey challenges the possessed Mai to a duel, knowing it is the only way to free her. She quickly plays the Seal of Orichalcos and summons a whole flock of Cyber Harpies, which, coupled with his physical condition, puts Joey in a tight spot. Meanwhile, Kaiba and Mokuba are close to Paradias headquarters while Yami, Téa and Tristan continue looking for Joey.
173	29	"Fighting for a Friend – Part 5"; Transliteration: "A Bitter Victory" (Japanese: 苦い勝利)	Akemi Omode	October 1, 2003	April 16, 2005
Mai's Cyber Harpies continue to destroy Joey's monsters and reduce his Life Points. Joey is only one attack away from defeat, but Mai finds herself unable to go through with it. Joey is too worn out from his last duel to continue dueling Mai and the Orichalcos takes his soul. Mai is freed from the Orichalcos' control and she swears to destroy Dartz. Kaiba fights off more Orichalcos soldiers while Yami, Téa and Tristan find a soulless Joey.
174	30	"Grappling with a Guardian – Part 1"; Transliteration: "The Duel of Destiny! Yugi vs. Rafael" (Japanese: 運命の決闘(デュエル)! 遊戯vsラフェール!)	Yasuyuki Suzuki	October 8, 2003	April 23, 2005
Distraught by Joey's defeat, Yami runs off to Paradias headquarters, where he finds a soulless Mai. He finds Rafael, who confesses to dueling Mai and challenges Yami to a duel. Téa and Tristan meet up with Kaiba and Mokuba and head to Dartz's headquarters. During Yami And Rafael's duel, Yami implores Rafael not to use the Seal of Orichalcos, but he does so anyway.
175	31	"Grappling with a Guardian – Part 2"; Transliteration: "Invincible! Guardian Deathscythe" (Japanese: 不死身! ガーディアン•デスサイス)	Yasuyuki Suzuki	October 15, 2003	April 30, 2005
Rafael has given in to the darkness and uses it to strengthen his monsters even further, including his beloved Guardian Eatos. Yami merges Timaeus and Dark Magician to form Amulet Dragon, which gains more attack points from the Spell cards in his graveyard. He successfully destroys Eatos, only for Rafael to summon Guardian Dreadscythe in its place. Realizing that Rafael is in the same position he was after playing the Seal of Orichalcos, Yami plays Underworld Circle to help him witness the darkness he unleashed on his Guardian monsters.
176	32	"Grappling with a Guardian – Part 3"; Transliteration: "Destroy the Darkness of the Heart!" (Japanese: 心の闇を撃て!)	Yasuyuki Suzuki	October 22, 2003	April 30, 2005
Taken to the graveyard by Underworld Circle, Yami and Rafael witness a flashback of Rafael's past, showing Dreadscythe's birth. Back at their duel, Rafael revives a nearly invincible Guardian Dreadscythe. Yami finally defeats it using Eatos and Goddess Bow. With the last of his Life Points, Rafael revives all his sacrificed Guardians. Even though he lost, Rafael's soul is spared from being taken by the Orichalcos, as he recovers the light inside his soul.
177	33	"A Duel with Dartz – Part 1"; Transliteration: "To the Place of the Final Battle! Dartz vs. Yugi and Kaiba" (Japanese: 戦の地へ! ダーツvs遊戯&海馬)	Shin Yoshida	October 29, 2003	May 7, 2005
Paradias headquarters collapses, and Rafael falls with it as Kaiba's plane comes to save them. Rafael gives Yami directions to Dartz's lair and the group heads off before being cornered by the authorities. Being told that they are the world's only hope, the plane heads off to Dartz's island, on which they find his lair etched with images of captured souls. Dartz challenges Yami and Kaiba to duel. During the duel, Yami, Kaiba and Dartz are shown the events of the past, detailing how Dartz came into contact with the Orichalcos.
178	34	"A Duel with Dartz – Part 2"; Transliteration: "The Tragedy of Atlantis" (Japanese: アトランティスの悲劇)	Shin Yoshida	November 5, 2003	May 7, 2005
Dartz shows Yami and Kaiba the history of Atlantis, how the Orichalcos drove them into insanity, and how he lost and killed his wife Iona. In an attempt to save his people, Dartz made a contract with the Great Leviathan to use the Orichalcos to purge mankind, in order to restore "paradise." However, he was stopped by the three Legendary Dragons and former King Ironheart. Back in the duel, Dartz plays the second layer of the Seal of Orichalcos, Orichalcos Dueteros, and he uses his Mirror Knight Calling to summon his four Mirror Knights, each containing the souls of Yugi, Joey, Pegasus and Mai. However, if the Knights are destroyed, their souls may be lost forever.
179	35	"A Duel with Dartz – Part 3"; Transliteration: "The Captive Mirror Knights" (Japanese: 囚われのミラーナイト)	Shin Yoshida	November 12, 2003	May 14, 2005
Kaiba refuses to let Yami's sentimentality cost them the duel and launches assaults on the Mirror Knights, only for them to defend each other by sacrificing their shields. Yugi talks to the Pharaoh and tells him to attack, saying that they would be alright. All the while, the second seal increases Dartz's Life Points, making him harder to beat. The Pharaoh plays weak moves and passes altogether. Rafael arrives and Dartz reveals he was responsible for the tragedies in his henchmen's lives, enraging Rafael and leading him to summon Guardian Eatos to attack Dartz, reviving the seal's power over him. Despite Yami Yugi's efforts, Rafael's rage consumes him and he loses his soul.
180	36	"A Duel with Dartz – Part 4"; Transliteration: "The Third Seal of Orichalcos" (Japanese: オレイカルコスの三重結界)	Shin Yoshida	November 19, 2003	May 14, 2005
Dartz plays the third seal of Orichalcos, letting him negate Spells, Traps and Monster Effects that target his monsters. Kaiba goes all-out, using the Fang of Critias to summon Mirror Force Dragon and destroy all of Dartz's monsters. However, Kyutora's destruction lets Dartz play Orichalcos Shunoros and summon the invincible shields Dexia and Aristoros. Kaiba's Life Points hit 0, but he activates Wish of Final Effort to raise Yami's Life Points before his soul is taken by the Orichalcos, leaving Yami to duel Dartz alone. With his soul captured, the Leviathan causes the world to shake and is nearly ready to be revived. Dartz knocks out Tristan, Téa and Mokuba, and tells Yami Yugi of their first encounter.
181	37	"A Duel with Dartz – Part 5"; Transliteration: "Revive! The Three Legendary Knights" (Japanese: よみがえれ! 伝説の三騎士)	Shin Yoshida	November 26, 2003	May 21, 2005
With Tristan, Téa and Mokuba out cold, Yami Yugi can no longer rely on his friends for moral support. Dartz tries to convince him to give up, saying that he would do more good to his friends by sacrificing his soul. Remembering that his friends will always be with him, Yami Yugi decides not to forfeit the duel, and instead activates Legend of Heart to unlock the Legendary Dragons' true forms: the three Legendary Knights of Atlantis. The three knights are able to destroy Dartz's Orichalcos Shunoros and Orichalcos Tritos, however Dartz discards all the cards in his hand and pays all his Life Points to summon the Divine Serpent, a creature with an infinite number of attack points. In order for the Pharaoh to win, he has to destroy Dartz's Divine Serpent. However, an attack from Divine Serpent promptly reduces Yami Yugi's Life Points to zero as well. By using the trap Relay Soul, Yami remains in the game, using Dark Magician Girl to prevent him from losing. But if Dark Magician Girl is destroyed, the Pharaoh will lose the duel and his soul. Dartz orders his Divine Serpent to attack Dark Magician Girl...
182	38	"A Duel with Dartz – Part 6"; Transliteration: "Infinite Attack Power — Serpent God Ge" (Japanese: ∞(むげんだい)攻撃(じゃしん)力 蛇神ゲー)	Shin Yoshida	December 3, 2003	May 21, 2005
Yami Yugi Fuses the Legendary Knights to form the Knight of Destiny, and destroys the Divine Serpent. As the duel ends, a vortex opens and Dartz is taken by the Great Leviathan. The knights release the souls of Yugi, Kaiba and Joey. A storm brews all over the world as Atlantis rises from the sea, causing a hurricane to head towards the East Coast. Yugi, Kaiba And Joey head to Atlantis and face off against the Great Leviathan, whom Dartz awakens by offering up his soul.
183	39	"Rise of the Great Beast – Part 1"; Transliteration: "Battle of the Gods" (Japanese: 神神の戦い)	Shin Yoshida	December 10, 2003	May 28, 2005
The gateway to the monster world opens and all the monsters come out to help Yugi, Kaiba and Joey. Despite the combined forces of their monsters, Yugi, Kaiba and Joey lose and are absorbed by the Great Leviathan. After the Pharoah is completely absorbed into the Leviathan, he rallies the souls Dartz captured and the monsters offer their strength, allowing Yami to summon the Egyptian god cards and free Kaiba, Joey, and himself from the Great Leviathan. He uses the monsters to destroy the Great Leviathan and free some captured souls. Yugi, Joey and Kaiba flee as Atlantis collapses, but Yugi and Yami are stopped by a resurgent Dartz and the Great Leviathan.
184	40	"Rise of the Great Beast – Part 2"; Transliteration: "Walk into the Light" (Japanese: 光の中を歩め)	Shin Yoshida	December 17, 2003	May 28, 2005
Yami Yugi is being absorbed by the Great Leviathan, as he still has darkness inside. With the light of his friendship, however, he is able to channel enough strength to lock away the Great Leviathan, ending the catastrophes plaguing the world. Dartz is freed from the Orichalcos and returns home with Kris and Ironheart. Yugi and Yami leave Atlantis, while the others flee the island as it collapses. Everyone whose soul was captured awakens. Mai leaves Valon with her Cyber Harpie and promises to face Joey in the future. Yugi and Yami wash up on shore and are visited by Dark Magician Girl and the Legendary Knights, who tell them that their world is safe. Then, the Legendary Knights return to the Duel Monsters Spirit World, promising to return if such a great darkness ever threatens the world again. Afterwards, the others find Yugi and rescue him from the island. Before Yugi departs from the island, he agrees that Yami that needs to find out the secrets of his past, and promises Yami that he will not be doing it alone.

== DVD release ==
Yu-Gi-Oh! Classic: Season 4
Set details
- 40 episodes
- 880 minutes
- 6-disc set
- 1.33:1 aspect ratio
- Subtitles: English
- Dubbed: English
- English (Dolby Digital Stereo)
Release dates
Region 1
March 25, 2014
