= Yu-Gi-Oh! Duel Monsters season 3 =

Yu-Gi-Oh! Enter the Shadow Realm
- Season 3
- No. of episodes: 47

Release
- Original network: TV Tokyo
- Original release: March 12, 2002 – February 11, 2003

Season chronology
- ← Previous; Season 2 Next → Season 4

The third season of the anime series Yu-Gi-Oh! Duel Monsters, created by Kazuki Takahashi, was originally broadcast from March 12, 2002, to February 11, 2003. The English adaptation, broadcast on Kids' WB, aired from November 1, 2003, to September 4, 2004.

The first half of the season follows an original story arc, where Yugi and his friends are transported to a digital universe, created and controlled by Noah, Seto Kaiba's adoptive brother. They are forced to duel the Big Five, KaibaCorp's former board of directors, in order to escape with their minds in their own bodies. The second half of the season focuses on the resumption of the Battle City tournament finals, where the final four duelists, Yugi, Joey (Jonouchi), Kaiba, and Marik, fight for the championship title.

The third season of Yu-Gi-Oh! Duel Monsters (also renamed as Yu-Gi-Oh! Enter the Shadow Realm in the English-dubbed adaptation) was formerly licensed by 4Kids Entertainment in North America and other English-speaking countries, and was also distributed by Funimation through North American home video distribution rights and also distributed by Warner Bros. Television Animation on North American television rights, when it aired on Kids' WB! and Cartoon Network, also in North America. It is now licensed and distributed by Konami Cross Media NY.

== Cast and characters ==
=== Japanese ===
==== Regular ====
- Hidehiro Kikuchi as Hiroto Honda
- Hiroki Takahashi as Katsuya Jonouchi
- Kenjiro Tsuda as Seto Kaiba
- Maki Saitoh as Anzu Mazaki
- Shunsuke Kazama as Yugi Moto/Yami Yugi

==== Recurring ====
- Chisa Yokoyama as Noa Kaiba
- Haruhi Nanao as Mai Kujaku
- Hiroomi Sugino as Souichiro Ota
- Hisashi Izumi as Kogoro Daimon
- Junkoh Takeuchi as Mokuba Kaiba
- Konta as Rashid Ishtar
- Mika Sakenobe as Shizuka Kawai
- Rica Matsumoto as Ryou Bakura/Yami Bakura
- Ryo Naitou as Ryuji Otogi
- Ryousuke Otani as Shuzo Otaki
- Shinichi Yashiro as Chikuzen Oka
- Shin-tarou Sonooka as Kounosuke Oshita
- Sumi Shimamoto as Isis Ishtar
- Tadashi Miyazawa as Sugoroku Mutou
- Tetsuya Iwanaga as Malik Ishtar
- Tetsuo Komura as Gozaburo Kaiba

==== Minor ====
- Masami Suzuki as Ghost Kotsuzuka
- Norihisa Mori as Satake
- Sakura Nogawa as Isis Ishtar (child)

=== English ===
==== Regular ====
- Amy Birnbaum as Téa Gardner
- Greg Abbey as Tristan Taylor
- Wayne Grayson as Joey Wheeler
- Dan Green as Yugi Muto/Yami Yugi
- Eric Stuart as Seto Kaiba

==== Recurring ====
- Michael Alston Baley as Odion Ishtar
- Maddie Blaustein as Solomon Muto
- Megan Hollingshead as Mai Valentine
- Tara Jayne as Mokuba Kaiba
- Karen Neil as Ishizu Ishtar
- Lisa Ortiz as Serenity Wheeler
- Andrew Rannells as Noah Kaiba
- J.T. Ross as Marik Ishtar/Yami Marik
- Marc Thompson as Duke Devlin and Gansley
- Robert O'Gorman as Crump
- David Wills as Gozaburo Kaiba and Nezbitt
- Tom Souhrada as Leichter
- Christopher Collet as Johnson
- Ted Lewis as Bakura Ryou/Yami Bakura

== Episodes ==
No. overall	No. in season	Title	Written by	Original release date	American air date
Noah's Saga
98	1	"A Virtual Nightmare!"; Transliteration: "The Unknown Challenger — The Giant Mobile Fortress Surfaces!" (Japanese: 未知なる挑戦者 巨大機動要塞浮上!)	Junki Takegami	March 12, 2002	November 1, 2003
On its way to the Battle City Finals, the KaibaCorp blimp is captured by a mysterious boy named Noah. Yugi, Kaiba, and the others are lured into a virtual world, where old enemies, the Big 5 (reduced to minds in programming), are waiting to exact their revenge.
99	2	"Isolated in Cyber Space — Part 1"; Transliteration: "Deck Master Deep Sea Warrior" (Japanese: デッキマスター 深海の戦士)	Tadashi Hayakawa, Junki Takegami	March 19, 2002	November 8, 2003
Yugi faces off against Gansley, in the form of "Deepsea Warrior", but struggles with the complexities of the dueling field and the new rules. Tea faces peril from a vicious tribe of cyclopses while Kaiba and Mokuba are brought to a setting similar to their old orphanage.
100	3	"Isolated in Cyber Space — Part 2"; Transliteration: "The Terrifying Regeneration Combo" (Japanese: 恐怖の再生コンボ)	Tadashi Hayakawa	March 26, 2002	November 8, 2003
Yugi's strategy is hindered by Gansley's Deck Master ability. Tristan and Duke face a mean dinosaur to save Serenity. Meanwhile, Kaiba and Mokuba confront painful visions of their miserable childhood, but within the heartache may lurk the key to Noah's true intentions.
101	4	"Isolated in Cyber Space — Part 3"; Transliteration: "The Rainbow Arch Strikes Back" (Japanese: 反撃のレインボーアーチ)	Tadashi Hayakawa	April 9, 2002	November 15, 2003
With his life points almost gone and Gansley's strategy working perfectly, Yugi calls on his Deck Master Kuriboh to help him win the duel. In a different realm of cyberspace, Téa's kidnapped by a group of Hitotsu-Me Giants, but is later saved by a penguin.
102	5	"Freeze Play — Part 1"; Transliteration: "Duel on Ice — Anzu Targeted" (Japanese: 氷上の決闘(デュエル) 狙われた杏子)	Shin Yoshida	April 16, 2002	November 15, 2003
Téa is led by a penguin to Crump, in the form of Nightmare Penguin, who challenges her to a duel. She learns immediately that dueling in the virtual realm differs starkly from her previous duels, and starts to succumb to the virtual playing field.
103	6	"Freeze Play — Part 2"; Transliteration: "Shine! The Jewel of the Sage" (Japanese: 輝け! 賢者の宝石)	Shin Yoshida	April 23, 2002	November 22, 2003
Despite gaining a lead with Maha Vailo, Téa falls behind as Crump begins an assault on her life points, causing the ice around her to grow. With the help of her Deck Master, Dark Magician Girl, and Yugi's Dark Magician, Téa gains enough confidence to win.
104	7	"Courtroom Chaos — Part 1"; Transliteration: "Deck Master Judgeman's Judgement" (Japanese: デッキマスター ジャッジマンの裁き)	Atsushi Maekawa	April 30, 2002	November 22, 2003
Joey faces the Big 5's lawyer, Johnson, in a courtroom duel. Joey pulls an early lead with his Deck Master, Flame Swordsman, but Johnson's Deck Master, Judge Man, has abilities of his own.
105	8	"Courtroom Chaos — Part 2"; Transliteration: "Gamble to Victory" (Japanese: 勝利への賭け)	Atsushi Maekawa	May 7, 2002	November 29, 2003
Joey attempts to pull through with several luck-based cards, but Johnson's cheating tactics ruin all his chances, until an angry Noah puts a stop to him.
106	9	"Mechanical Mayhem — Part 1"; Transliteration: "A Man's Path of Glory — Honda's Honorable Defeat" (Japanese: 男の花道 本田玉砕)	Tadashi Hayakawa	May 14, 2002	November 29, 2003
Tristan, Duke and Serenity duel Nesbitt, the Big 5's mechanical expert. Serenity's lack of experience with the game and Nesbit's powerful machine monsters create a tragic end for Tristan.
107	10	"Mechanical Mayhem — Part 2"; Transliteration: "Saint Jannu's Trinity Attack" (Japanese: 聖女ジャンヌ三位一体の攻撃)	Tadashi Hayakawa	May 21, 2002	December 6, 2003
With Tristan gone and Serenity in shock, Duke attempts to defeat Nesbitt by himself. But when Orgoth the Relentless is destroyed by his Perfect Machine King, Duke tries to help Serenity regain confidence in her abilities. The two later remember Tristan's face down card, hoping it will help them win.
108	11	"Settling the Score — Part 1"; Transliteration: "Kidnapped Mokuba — Kaiba vs. Psycho Shocker" (Japanese: さらわれたモクバ 海馬vsサイコショッカー)	Shin Yoshida	May 28, 2002	December 13, 2003
As Nesbitt (in Tristan's body) kidnaps Mokuba, Kaiba is forced to duel Lector, the former assistant to his stepfather. For Lector, the duel is personal, as he plans to take what he believes is rightfully his—KaibaCorp. Meanwhile, Tristan rejoins the group; his friends do not recognize him, since his mind has been downloaded into a mechanical monkey.
109	12	"Settling the Score — Part 2"; Transliteration: "Attacks from Outer Space — Satellite Cannon" (Japanese: 宇宙からの攻撃 サテライトキャノン)	Shin Yoshida	June 4, 2002	December 20, 2003
With Lector's Jinzo Deck Master destroying all of Kaiba's traps, Imperial Order destroying all his spell cards, and Lector's unreachable Satellite Cannon striking from space, Kaiba doesn't seem to stand a chance. Mokuba's unwavering faith in Kaiba keeps him believing that his brother will pull out with a victory, but Noah has plans to ruin their brotherhood.
110	13	"Noah's Secret"; Transliteration: "The Deepening Mystery — Noah Kaiba" (Japanese: 深まる謎 乃亜の正体)	Junki Takegami	June 11, 2002	January 10, 2004
Yugi, Kaiba, and Tea are separated from the others as the Big 5 (minus Nesbitt) plan to take their bodies anyway. As Noah tortures Kaiba by brainwashing Mokuba, he reveals his true identity as Gozaboro Kaiba's biological son.
111	14	"Merger of the Big Five — Part 1"; Transliteration: "Big 5's Counterattack" (Japanese: ビッグ5の逆襲)	Atsushi Maekawa	June 18, 2002	January 17, 2004
Noah gives the Big Five one last chance to redeem themselves in a five-on-two tag team duel where Yugi and Joey take on the entire Big Five, who are using Tristan's body.
112	15	"Merger of the Big Five — Part 2"; Transliteration: "Target: Jonouchi — The Teamwork Play to Victory" (Japanese: 狙われた城之内 勝利への連係プレー)	Atsushi Maekawa	June 25, 2002	January 24, 2004
The Big 5 attempt various strategies of victory, with the aim of eliminating Joey first. However, their poor teamwork soon puts Yugi and Joey ahead. Lector then calls their most powerful monster to the field, the Five Head Dragon.
113	16	"Merger of the Big Five — Part 3"; Transliteration: "Defeat it! Five-Headed Dragon" (Japanese: 倒せ! ファイブゴッドドラゴン)	Atsushi Maekawa	July 2, 2002	January 31, 2004
Yugi and Joey are forced to use their strongest monsters to take down the Five-Headed Dragon.
114	17	"Brothers in Arms — Part 1"; Transliteration: "Noa vs. Seto — The Duel of Heaven and Earth's Creation" (Japanese: 乃亜vs瀬人 天地創造の決闘)	Shin Yoshida	July 16, 2002	February 7, 2004
Kaiba and Noah duel for full control of KaibaCorp, but Noah's revelations and constant manipulation of the playing field complicate things for Kaiba.
115	18	"Brothers in Arms — Part 2"; Transliteration: "The Invincible Deck Master — The Miracle Ark" (Japanese: 無敵デッキマスター 奇跡の箱舟)	Shin Yoshida	July 23, 2002	February 14, 2004
Noah's Shinato's Ark puts Kaiba in a difficult position, as he scrambles to find a winning strategy.
116	19	"Brothers in Arms — Part 3"; Transliteration: "Save Mokuba! The Seventh Turn of Fate" (Japanese: モクバを救え! 運命の第七ターン)	Shin Yoshida	July 30, 2002	February 21, 2004
Kaiba regains control of the duel, but Noah brings a brainwashed Mokuba out to hinder his plans. After finally breaking through to Mokuba, Kaiba tries to embrace his brother before Noah, jealous over their close relationship, turns them to stone.
117	20	"Noah's Final Threat — Part 1"; Transliteration: "Change of Decks — Yugi vs. Noa" (Japanese: 引き継ぎし山札 遊戯vs乃亜)	Shin Yoshida	August 6, 2002	February 28, 2004
Enraged at Noah's cruel games, Yugi takes over for Kaiba and duels Noah with only 400 life points.
118	21	"Noah's Final Threat — Part 2"; Transliteration: "LP(Life Point) 10000 vs. 100!!" (Japanese: LP(ライフポイント) 10000vs100!!)	Shin Yoshida	August 18, 2002	March 6, 2004
Yugi's efforts to win the duel are further complicated by Noah, who turns all of his friends into stone statues, leaving Yugi feeling alone and without hope.
119	22	"So Close Yet So Far"; Transliteration: "Darkness of the Kaiba Family" (Japanese: 海馬家の闇)	Atsushi Maekawa	August 20, 2002	March 20, 2004
Gozaboro Kaiba reveals himself and plans to virtualize the entire world to create a digital kingdom. With Noah's unlikely aid, Yugi and the others must escape while fending off memories from the past.
120	23	"Burying the Past — Part 1"; Transliteration: "Exodia Necross" (Japanese: エクゾディア·ネクロス)	Atsushi Maekawa	August 27, 2002	April 3, 2004
Using Mokuba's body, Noah escapes and sets the virtual world to self-destruct. But Mokuba's kindness breaks through his heart, and he tries to set the others free. Meanwhile, Kaiba duels Gozaboro, who summons a seemingly unstoppable monster—Exodia Necross. Note: When aired in Japan, it was an hour-long special.
121	24	"Burying the Past — Part 2"; Transliteration: "Escape!!" (Japanese: 脱出!!)	Atsushi Maekawa	August 27, 2002	April 17, 2004
Yami Marik destroys the computers in the control room, disabling the controls for the self-destruct mechanism, which turns the situation desperate. Meanwhile, Kaiba defeats Gozoboro Kaiba, and he and Yugi rush to the exit before the virtual world explodes. Noah erases Gozoboro's files and releases his mind, and finally makes peace with his family, and prepares for the destruction of the virtual world. Note: When aired in Japan, it was an hour-long special.
Enter the Shadow Realm
122	25	"Back to Battle City — Part 1"; Transliteration: "The Place of the Finals — Alcatraz" (Japanese: 決戦の地 アルカトラズ)	Akemi Omode	August 27, 2002	May 1, 2004
Yugi and the others arrive at KaibaCorp Island and The Battle City Finals resume. To decide who will duel whom, the four duelists--Yugi, Joey, Kaiba, and Marik-- face each other in a four-way duel in the Duel Tower.
123	26	"Back to Battle City — Part 2"; Transliteration: "Battle Royale!" (Japanese: バトルロイヤル!)	Shin Yoshida	September 3, 2002	May 8, 2004
The four-way duel continues with Joey determined to duel Marik in order to save Mai while Marik and Kaiba both intend to face Yugi. Meanwhile, Ishizu reflects on her past.
124	27	"Back to Battle City — Part 3"; Transliteration: "The Respective Opponents" (Japanese: それぞれの対戦者)	Yoshiki Sakurai, Atsushi Maekawa	September 3, 2002	May 15, 2004
With the conclusion of the four-way duel, the match-ups for the semi-finals are determined — Joey will duel Marik while Yugi will be facing off against Kaiba.
125	28	"The Darkness Returns — Part 1"; Transliteration: "The Dark Semi-Final Duel — Jonouchi vs. Marik" (Japanese: 闇の準決勝 城之内vsマリク)	Akemi Omode	September 10, 2002	May 15, 2004
Marik brings Joey and himself to the Shadow Realm, where each duelist's heart is linked with his monsters, suffering the pain that the monsters feel. Note: When aired in Japan, it was an hour-long special.
126	29	"The Darkness Returns — Part 2"; Transliteration: "The Hell Poet – Helpoemer" (Japanese: 地獄の詩人 ヘルポエマー)	Akihiko Inari	September 17, 2002	May 22, 2004
Marik's duel tactics eat away at Joey's deck and his life points. Joey's comeback strategy, however is hindered by Marik's new monster on Joey's side of the field. Note: When aired in Japan, it was an hour-long special.
127	30	"The Darkness Returns — Part 3"; Transliteration: "The Turning of the Tide! Gilford the Lightning" (Japanese: 逆転! 稲妻の戦士(ギルフォード・ザ・ライトニング))	Atsushi Maekawa	September 24, 2002	May 22, 2004
With life points dropping and his monsters unable to attack, Joey summons a monster that proves to be his saving grace, prompting Marik to unleash Ra.
128	31	"The Darkness Returns — Part 4"; Transliteration: "Jonouchi's Death" (Japanese: 城之内死す)	Atsushi Maekawa	October 8, 2002	May 29, 2004
Despite surviving Marik's onslaught, Joey is weakened by the shadow game's effects and succumbs just as he is about to win the duel. Yugi struggles to find hope after losing his best friend to the Shadow Realm.
129	32	"Clash in the Coliseum — Part 1"; Transliteration: "Tenkū Koroshiamu Yūgi vs Kaiba" (Japanese: 天空闘戯場(コロシアム) 遊戯vs海馬)	Akemi Omode	October 15, 2002	May 29, 2004
The second duel of the semi-finals begins with Yugi dueling Kaiba for the second spot in the grand final and the chance to duel Marik. Kaiba draws Obelisk on his first turn, but Yugi thwarts his attempts to summon it with Lightforce Sword.
130	33	"Clash in the Coliseum — Part 2"; Transliteration: "The Three Knights Used to Call God" (Japanese: 神を喚(よ)ぶ三騎士)	Akemi Omode	October 22, 2002	June 5, 2004
Kaiba and Yugi compete to summon their monsters to the field, but each is hindered by the other's strategies.
131	34	"Clash in the Coliseum — Part 3"; Transliteration: "Clash! Osiris VS Obelisk" (Japanese: 激突! 神(オシリス)vs神(オベリスク))	Shin Yoshida	October 29, 2002	June 12, 2004
Kaiba is able to summon Obelisk the Tormentor, to the field, putting it at odds with Yugi's own Slifer the Sky Dragon.
132	35	"Clash in the Coliseum — Part 4"; Transliteration: "The Inherited Destined Duel" (Japanese: 受け継ぎし運命の決闘(デュエル))	Shin Yoshida	November 5, 2002	June 19, 2004
With the destruction of both their monsters, Kaiba and Yugi are presented with a vision of the High Priest's legendary battle against the Pharaoh. Kaiba believes this to be a mere illusion, but Yugi knows that it is a vision of the past. The duel continues with Kaiba and Yugi attacking with their signature cards. Note: When aired in Japan, it was a 90-minute-long special.
133	36	"Clash in the Coliseum — Part 5"; Transliteration: "The Promise to a Friend — Red-Eyes Black Dragon" (Japanese: 友との誓い 真紅眼の黒竜(レッドアイズ ブラックドラゴン))	Atsushi Maekawa	November 12, 2002	June 26, 2004
Kaiba gains a lead in the duel when he summons three Blue Eyes White Dragons. Yugi's hopes of winning come to an end, but receives some encouragement from Joey and stays strong in the game. Meanwhile, Joey's dreams and the ongoing duel cause Joey to awake. Note: When aired in Japan, it was a 90-minute-long special.
134	37	"Clash in the Coliseum — Part 6"; Transliteration: "Destroy the Hatred! Black Paladin" (Japanese: 憎しみを撃て! ブラックパラディン)	Akihiko Inari	November 19, 2002	July 3, 2004
Kaiba's final move forces the duelists to use only three cards, forcing to use the best cards in the decks to win the duel. Note: When aired in Japan, it was a 90-minute-long special.
135	38	"Battle for the Bronze — Part 1"; Transliteration: "The Mediocre's Road to Flame — Jonouchi vs. Kaiba" (Japanese: 炎の凡骨(ばんけつ)ロード 城之内vs海馬)	Atsushi Maekawa	December 3, 2002	July 10, 2004
Tired of Kaiba's constant ridicule, Joey challenges Kaiba for third place in the Battle City tournament.
136	39	"Battle for the Bronze — Part 2"; Transliteration: "Burū-Aizu Howaito Doragon vs Burū-Aizu Howaito Doragon" (Japanese: 青眼の白龍(ブルーアイズ・ホワイトドラゴン)vs青眼の白龍(ブルーアイズ・ホワイトドラゴン))	Akemi Omode	December 10, 2002	July 17, 2004
Joey manages to gain one of Kaiba's strongest cards to help him advance in the duel. Meanwhile, Téa – possessed by the good half of Marik's soul – fights Yami Marik for control of the Millennium Rod.
137	40	"Battle for the Bronze — Part 3"; Transliteration: "The Path to Becoming a True Duelist" (Japanese: 真のデュエリストへの道)	Akemi Omode	December 17, 2002	July 24, 2004
After defeating Joey and taking third place in the tournament, Kaiba plans to destroy the Duel Tower and bury his past forever. Ishizu and Mokuba convince him otherwise, and he gives Yugi one all-powerful card that could give him a chance to defeat Marik in the final duel.
138	41	"The Final Face Off — Part 1"; Transliteration: "The Final: Yugi vs Malik" (Japanese: 決勝戦(ファイナル) 遊戯vsマリク)	Akihiko Inari	December 24, 2002	July 31, 2004
The final duel of Battle City begins. Yami Marik quickly turns it into a shadow game and sets it up so that if he or the Pharaoh loses, their host's soul will be destroyed. Yugi convinces the Pharaoh not to worry about him and to keep dueling to save Mai, Bakura and the good Marik. Yami Marik quickly discards his Winged Dragon of Ra to the graveyard, planning to revive it. Yugi manages to summon Slifer the Sky Dragon using his three Knights.
139	42	"The Final Face Off — Part 2"; Transliteration: "Devil's Sanctuary Activates!" (Japanese: 悪魔の聖域(デビルズサンクチュアリ)発動!)	Akihiko Inari	January 7, 2003	August 14, 2004
Marik uses Ra's effect to destroy Slifer and revives it once again to attack Yugi. Yugi plays the card Kaiba gave him, Fiend's Sanctuary, to stop Marik's attack. He then uses Multiply in order to summon Obelisk the Tormentor and devastate Marik.
140	43	"The Final Face Off — Part 3"; Transliteration: "Immortal Wall: God Slime" (Japanese: 不死の壁 ゴッドスライム)	Akemi Omode	January 14, 2003	August 21, 2004
Marik's good half possesses Tea again and begs Yugi to destroy him along with his evil side, but he eventually weakens and begins fading away as his dark half loses life points. Yugi and the Pharaoh become hesitant to duel, not wanting to harm the good Marik. As he fades away, Marik appears to an unconscious Odion, thanks him for taking care of him and apologizes, wishing that he could take back his cruel actions. In a cliffhanger, Odion is revealed to have been awakened by Marik's apology.
141	44	"The Final Face Off — Part 4"; Transliteration: "Obelisk's Anger: Soul Energy—MAX)" (Japanese: オベリスクの怒り ソウルエナジーMAX)	Atsushi Maekawa	January 21, 2003	August 28, 2004
Yugi continues fending off Marik's attacks, holding out until he has the cards he needs to defeat Marik. Finally, he summons Dark Magician and Dark Magician Girl and uses them to activate Ragnarok – a spell card with the ability to destroy all the monsters on Marik's field, including The Winged Dragon of Ra that he fused himself with. (The card actually negates and removes all cards Marik controls, at the cost of banishing all monsters to the graveyard that Yami Yugi has.) But Yami Marik claims that if Ra is destroyed (which will leave the good Marik with only 1 life point), then the good Marik will be too weak to resist the power of the Shadow Realm, and will consequently lose his soul. Then, Odion arrives (although he is still weak), and tells Yami Marik that he has come to release his master (the good Marik), although Yami Marik counters this by saying that Marik's good half is almost completely gone, and that he is here to stay.
142	45	"The Final Face Off — Part 5"; Transliteration: "Battle City Ends!" (Japanese: バトルシティ終結!)	Akemi Omode	January 28, 2003	August 28, 2004
Odion tries to get the good Marik to resist his evil half. As a result, Yami Marik becomes angered, and attacks Odion with the Millennium Rod, which weakens Odion even more. Odion doesn't give up, despite Ishizu's protests. As Marik continues his onslaught (which begins to injure Odion), Odion tells Marik's good side that together, they had conquered his evil half before, and that they could do it again. Then, he tells the good Marik that since Yami Marik was created by the good Marik's hatred, he has the power to destroy him. As Yami Marik raises the Rod to deliver the final blow, the good Marik disappears from the field, and begins fighting against Yami Marik, who struggles for control over Marik's body, and refuses to be defeated. However, Marik's good half stalls Yami Marik long enough for Yugi to activate his spell card. Yugi's Ragnarok spell succeeds in destroying (and removing to the graveyard) Ra, allowing the good Marik to regain control of his body. However, a sliver of Yami Marik reappears on the field, although this time, he is the victim. Yami Marik tries to convince the good Marik to help him seize the Millennium Items and rule the world together, but fails as Marik has decided to stop being evil and make up for his actions. Marik surrenders the duel to Yugi, which sends Yami Marik to the Shadow Realm, ending the Battle City finals. Bakura and Mai are returned from the shadow realm and Marik is reunited with his siblings, who forgive him. Yugi receives the three Egyptian God Cards. Kaiba then activates the Duel Tower's self-destruct sequence, giving everybody one hour to get off the island before it explodes.
143	46	"One for the Road"; Transliteration: "The Destruction of Alcatraz" (Japanese: アルカトラズ炎上)	Atsushi Maekawa	February 4, 2003	September 4, 2004
Yugi and the gang escape from the island in time, but they are forced to leave Kaiba and Mokuba behind. The brothers get away just as the island explodes using the Blue-Eyes White Jet. Yugi's group heads back to Domino City, where they say their farewells and go their separate ways.
144	47	"Looking Back and Moving Ahead"; Transliteration: "A Sign" (Japanese: 兆(きざし))	Atsushi Maekawa	February 11, 2003	September 4, 2004
Téa shows Serenity around the city, to all the sites of the important duels of the Battle City Tournament, while Joey duels Yugi to get his Red-Eyes Black Dragon back. Téa eventually meets up with Yugi, and they head off for further adventures. Note: This episode recaps all the events of the Battle City Tournament.

== Home media ==
Between March and October 2005, Funimation Productions released the second half of the season over five volumes of DVDs, each containing 4 – 5 episodes. They later released the complete season on July 29, 2008. In late 2013, Cinedigm and 4K Media Inc. reached a distribution agreement that would result in the release of every episode from the Yu-Gi-Oh! franchise on DVD and Blu-ray and to digital retailers. The complete third season, titled Yu-Gi-Oh! Classic: Season 3, was released on January 14, 2014, on DVD. It was also released in two volumes, like the previous seasons, on the same day both digitally and on DVD.

=== DVD release ===
Yu-Gi-Oh: The Complete Third Season
Set details
- 47 episodes
- 1034 minutes
- 7-disc set
- 1.33:1 aspect ratio
- Subtitles: English
- Dubbed: English
- English (Dolby Digital Stereo)
Release dates
Region 1
July 29, 2008

Yu-Gi-Oh! Classic: Season 3
Set details
- 47 episodes
- 1034 minutes
- 6-disc set
- 1.33:1 aspect ratio
- Subtitles: English
- Dubbed: English
- English (Dolby Digital Stereo)
Release dates
Region 1
January 14, 2014
