= Yu-Gi-Oh! Duel Monsters season 1 =

Yu-Gi-Oh! Duel Monsters
- Season 1
- Season 1 DVD cover
- No. of episodes: 49

Release
- Original network: TV Tokyo
- Original release: April 18, 2000 – April 3, 2001

Season chronology
- Next → Season 2

The first season of Yu-Gi-Oh! Duel Monsters, based on the manga by Kazuki Takahashi, premiered in Japan on April 18, 2000, and concluded on April 3, 2001, on TV Tokyo. The season was directed by Kunihisa Sugishima, and written by Junki Takegami, Masashi Sogo, and Shin Yoshida. The English version of this season premiered in the United States on September 29, 2001 on Kids' WB, and concluded on November 9, 2002.

The season follows Yugi Mutou and his friends - Katsuya Jonouchi, Hiroto Honda, and Anzu Mazaki (renamed to Joey Wheeler, Tristan Taylor and Téa Gardner in the English adaptation) - to Duelist Kingdom, a tournament on the island of the same name, to free the soul of his grandfather, Sugoroku (renamed Solomon Moto in the English adaptation) from imprisonment by Pegasus J. Crawford (renamed Maximillion Pegasus in the English adaptation). The last ten episodes deal with the aftermath of Yugi's duel with Pegasus, including several filler episodes featuring original storylines not seen in the manga.

Between September 24, 2002, and February 22, 2005, Funimation released twenty DVD sets for the season: twelve sets containing three episodes, three containing four episodes, one with two episodes, one containing all forty-nine episodes and the last three containing uncut versions of the first nine episodes. All DVDs were encoded in Region 1. The first season of Yu-Gi-Oh! Duel Monsters was formerly licensed by 4Kids Entertainment in North America, and other English-speaking territories and countries. It is now licensed and distributed by 4K Media.

== Cast and characters ==
=== Japanese ===
==== Regular ====
- Hidehiro Kikuchi as Hiroto Honda
- Hiroki Takahashi as Katsuya Jonouchi
- Kenjiro Tsuda as Seto Kaiba
- Maki Saitoh as Anzu Mazaki
- Shunsuke Kazama as Yugi Muto/Yami Yugi

==== Recurring ====
- Hajime Komada as Keith Howard
- Haruhi Nanao as Mai Kujaku
- Jirou Jay Takasugi as Pegasus J. Crawford
- Junkoh Takeuchi as Mokuba Kaiba
- You Inoue as Ryou Bakura/Yami Bakura
- Tadashi Miyazawa as Sugoroku Mutou
- Urara Takano as Insector Haga
- Yuuichi Nakamura as Dinosaur Ryuzaki

==== Guest stars ====
- Daisuke Namikawa as Ryouta Kajiki
- Eiji Takemoto as Takaido
- Harî Kaneko as Killer Player (PaniK)
- Kaori Tagami as Rebecca Hopkins
- Masami Suzuki as Ghost Kotsuzuka
- Mika Sakenobe as Shizuka Kawai
- Norihisa Mori as Satake
- Ryo Naitou as Ryuji Otoga

=== English ===
==== Regular ====
- Amy Birnbaum as Téa Gardner
- Sam Riegel as Tristan Taylor (Episodes 1–10)
- Wayne Grayson as Joey Wheeler
- Dan Green as Yugi Muto/Yami Yugi
- John Campbell as Tristan Taylor (Episodes 11+)
- Eric Stuart as Seto Kaiba

==== Recurring ====
- Maddie Blaustein as Solomon Moto
- Darren Dunstan as Maximillion Pegasus
- Megan Hollingshead as Mai Valentine
- Tara Jayne as Mokuba Kaiba
- Ted Lewis as Bakura Ryou, "Bandit" Keith Howard, Croquet
- Sam Riegel as Rex Raptor
- Jimmy Zoppi as Weevil Underwood
- Andrew Rannells as Mako Tsunami

==== Guest stars ====
- Amy Birnbaum as Bonz
- Maddie Blaustein as Zygor
- David Moo as PaniK
- Lisa Ortiz as Serenity Wheeler
- Marc Thompson as Duke Devlin
- Kerry Williams as Rebecca Hawkins
- Eric Stuart as Kemo, Sid
- Mike Pollock as Arthur Hawkins

== Episode list ==
| No. overall | No. in season | English dub title / Japanese translated title | Written by | Original release date | American air date |
|---|---|---|---|---|---|
Duelist Kingdom
| 1 | 1 | "The Heart of the Cards" / "The Bloodcurdling Blue-Eyes White Dragon"; Transliteration: "Senritsu no Burūaizu Howaito Doragon" (Japanese: 戦慄のブルーアイズ・ホワイト・ドラゴン) | Junki Takegami | April 18, 2000 | September 29, 2001 |
Yugi Muto and his three best friends – Joseph "Joey" Wheeler, Tristan Taylor and Tea Gardner – are in awe over Grandpa Solomon's collection of hundreds of rare Duel Monsters cards, but when #1 ranked Duelist and ruthless tycoon Seto Kaiba kidnaps Grandpa to get one of the rare four Blue-Eyes White Dragon cards, Yugi must face Kaiba in the "ultimate Duel Monsters showdown" and avenge his maternal grandfather's honor.
| 2 | 2 | "The Gauntlet Is Thrown" / "The Trap of Illusionist No Face"; Transliteration: "Iryūjonisuto No Feisu no Wana" (Japanese: 幻想師(イリュージョニスト)ノー・フェイスの罠) | Junki Takegami | April 25, 2000 | October 6, 2001 |
Yugi and his best friends take a break from perfecting their duelling skills to watch bug duelist Weevil Underwood defeat dinosaur duelist Rex Raptor in the Duel Monsters Regional Championship. When Yugi opens a package from Duel Monsters creator, Maximillion J. Pegasus, Yugi is forced to face him in the mysterious Shadow Realm, where all the monsters and magic are real. Upon defeating Yugi, Pegasus magically claims the spirit of Yugi's Grandpa via the strength of his strong Millennium Eye. Yugi must travel to the Duelist Kingdom and win Pegasus' tournament if he is ever to see his Grandpa alive again.
| 3 | 3 | "Journey to the Duelist Kingdom" / "The Lost Exodia"; Transliteration: "Ushinawareshi Ekuzodia" (Japanese: 失われしエクゾディア) | Masashi Sogo | May 2, 2000 | October 13, 2001 |
When the time comes to head off to the Duelist Kingdom, Yugi is ready and determined to save his Grandpa's soul from Pegasus. Yugi gives up one of his own star chips to Joey so that he can join up with Yugi and board the boat bound for Duelist Kingdom, his reason being is that he wants to duel in the tournament so that he can attempt to save his young sister, Serenity's failing eyesight. Meanwhile, Téa and Tristan stowaway to join their friends, making sure to not get caught by the security guards. When word spreads throughout the entire boat that Yugi was the one who had defeated the World Champion Kaiba, the cunning cheat Weevil Underwood tries to cripple Yugi's deck by tossing his Exodia cards overboard just as they reach the island.
| 4 | 4 | "Into the Hornet's Nest" / "The Insector Combination"; Transliteration: "Insekutā Konbo" (Japanese: インセクターコンボ) | Shin Yoshida | May 9, 2000 | October 20, 2001 |
Once Yugi and his friends reach Duelist Kingdom, Pegasus announces that there are many strange secrets on the island which will make his ultimate tournament unlike any they have ever had. When Weevil begins to use these mysterious new rules against Yugi from within their duel, Yugi must not only figure the rules out, but master them as well if he is to survive. After Yugi defeats Weevil's first wave of Duel Monsters, he's shocked to discover that Weevil has one last trick up his sleeve; a ravenous Great Moth that grows in power with every turn. Yugi must find a way to destroy this winged beast before it destroys him. The American version was combined into one episode called "Welcome to the Duelist Kingdom". All other countries received the episode in its two-part form, which was also released on VHS and DVD in the US, but it eventually aired on 4Kids TV on November 25, 2006.
| 5 | 5 | "The Ultimate Great Moth" / "The Ultimate Perfect Appearance – Great Moth"; Transliteration: "Kyūkoku Kanzen Tai: Gurēto Mosu" (Japanese: 究極完全態 グレート・モス) | Shin Yoshida | May 16, 2000 | October 20, 2001 |
Once Yugi and his friends reach Duelist Kingdom, Pegasus announces that there are many strange secrets on the island which will make his ultimate tournament unlike any they have ever had. When Weevil begins to use these mysterious new rules against Yugi from within their duel, Yugi must not only figure the rules out, but master them as well if he is to survive. After Yugi defeats Weevil's first wave of Duel Monsters, Weevil summons a ravenous Great Moth that grows in power with every turn, which Yugi is able to defeat, winning him the match and eliminating Weevil from the tournament, with Yugi declaring that Weevil only won the regionals via lying and cheating. The American version was combined into one episode called "Welcome to the Duelist Kingdom". All other countries received the episode in its two-part form, which was also released on VHS and DVD in the US, but it eventually aired on 4Kids TV on December 2, 2006.
| 6 | 6 | "First Duel" / "The Beautiful Harpy Ladies"; Transliteration: "Kareinaru Hāpi Redi" (Japanese: 華麗なるハーピィ・レディ) | Junki Takegami | May 23, 2000 | November 3, 2001 |
After seeing Yugi defeat Weevil while eliminating him from the tournament at the same time as well, Joey is amped up for a Duel Monsters challenge and soon finds himself accepting a match from veteran duelist, Mai Valentine. When Mai begins to demonstrate an unnerving psychic-like ability, Joey becomes flustered, but he is soon able to turn things around and manages to win the duel against Mai.
| 7 | 7 | "Attack from the Deep" / "The Sea-God Leviathan"; Transliteration: "Kaishin Ribaiasan" (Japanese: 海神リバイアサン) | Masashi Sogo | May 30, 2000 | November 10, 2001 |
Yugi, Tristan, Joey, and Téa are hungry and realize that they haven't brought any food for the trip. Joey, however, follows his nose to some fish someone has left over a fire. Joey and Tristan eagerly dig in, but are soon surprised by an unknown man who climbs out of the sea. Yugi soon realizes that the unknown man is the fisherman duelist Mako Tsunami and the master of the Sea Deck. After Mako learns who Yugi is, he invites Yugi and all his friends to eat the fish. When Yugi and his friends attempt to leave after eating, Mako quickly stops them dead in their tracks and swiftly demands that Yugi duel him. Yugi changes into Yami Yugi and defeats Mako from within their duel.
| 8 | 8 | "Everything's Relative" / "The Stolen Blue-Eyes White Dragon"; Transliteration: "Ubawareta Burūaizu Howaito Doragon" (Japanese: 奪われたブルーアイズ・ホワイト・ドラゴン) | Junki Takegami | June 6, 2000 | November 17, 2001 |
A masked boy escapes from Pegasus' North tower and into the forest, determined to find Yugi for unknown purposes. Within time, Yugi and his friends run into a young kid who had his star chips and duel deck stolen by the same masked boy. Determined to return the stolen property to the young kid, who is in danger of being forced to leave the island, Yugi and his friends head back to the scene of the crime and run into the masked boy. The masked boy wants to duel Yugi, who accepts. Yugi transforms into Yami Yugi and wager all five of his star chips to start the duel. It is soon revealed that the masked boy is in fact Mokuba, Kaiba's little brother, who seeks revenge against Yugi for his brother's past defeat, but Yugi is able to convince Mokuba into letting go of his personal hatred towards him so that the two of them can work together into stopping Pegasus.
| 9 | 9 | "Duel with a Ghoul" / "Revival of the Dead! Magical Silk Hat"; Transliteration: "Kishi Kaisei! Majikaru Shiruku Hatto" (Japanese: 起死回生! マジカルシルクハット) | Masashi Sogo | June 13, 2000 | November 24, 2001 |
In order to save Mokuba from the current danger, Yami Yugi must duel a person claiming to be the ghost of Kaiba, betting his last three star chips on the match. Meanwhile, the real Kaiba, who is revealed to have survived his dangerous fall into the ocean after a sudden and unexpected confrontation with two of Pegasus' henchmen, enters into one of his secret labs to gather information. Kaiba hacks into Pegasus' computer mainframe to find Yugi so that he can make sure he doesn't lose after learning and knowing that Yugi's potential loss to Pegasus would enable Pegasus to gain control over KaibaCorp.
| 10 | 10 | "Give up the Ghost" / "Blue-Eyes White Dragon Strikes Back"; Transliteration: "Gyakushū no Burūaizu Howaito Doragon" (Japanese: 逆襲のブルーアイズ・ホワイト・ドラゴン) | Masashi Sogo | June 20, 2000 | December 1, 2001 |
Through both luck and faith, Yugi is able to defeat the Blue-Eyes White Dragon with his Dark Magician, but his victory is soon cut short when Kaiba's "ghost" quickly unleashes a second Blue-Eyes and annihilates the Dark Magician with ease. Despite this, Yugi manages to win the duel in the end and uses his "Mind Crush" ability to send the false Kaiba back to the Shadow Realm.
| 11 | 11 | "The Dueling Monkey" / "Friendship Power! Barbarian #1 & #2"; Transliteration: "Yūjō Pawā Bābarian Ichi-go Ni-go" (Japanese: 友情パワー! バーバリアン1号・2号) | Shin Yoshida | June 27, 2000 | December 15, 2001 |
Ever since Joey had defeated her from a while back, Mai realizes that she no longer enjoys dueling as much as she used to and vows to get revenge against Joey. When Rex Raptor challenges her to a duel, she says that she'll take him on, but only if he beats Joey first.
| 12 | 12 | "Trial by Red-Eyes" / "Black Flare! Red-Eyes Black Dragon"; Transliteration: "Kuroki Honō! Reddoaizu Burakku Doragon" (Japanese: 黒き炎! レッドアイズ・ブラックドラゴン) | Shin Yoshida | July 4, 2000 | January 19, 2002 |
When Rex plays his powerful Red-Eyes Black Dragon, Joey has to figure out a way to counter it without Yugi's help. Joey's Time Wizard helps him defeat and eliminate Rex from the tournament, earning not only his star chips, but also his Red-Eyes as well via a bet that Rex had made with Joey during their duel. After the duel's conclusion, the group runs into their old friend Bakura and decide to have a friendly duel just for fun. However, Bakura reveals that he possess his own Millennium Item, the Millennium Ring, and an evil spirit within the Ring steals their souls so he can take the Millennium Puzzle from Yugi. He is shocked to be approached by his own light counterpart- the being who dwells from within the Puzzle, and assures him that there is more at stake than he comprehends and that this will be a shadow game which he cannot win.
| 13 | 13 | "Evil Spirit of the Ring" / "Trap of the Metamorpot! Flame Swordsman in Danger"; Transliteration: "Metamorupotto no Wana! Honō no Kenshi Ayaushi" (Japanese: メタモルポットの罠! 炎の剣士危うし) | Junki Takegami | July 11, 2000 | January 26, 2002 |
Yami Bakura lures Yami Yugi into a Shadow Game, where the gang (including Yugi himself) have had their souls sealed into their favourite cards. When a "soul card" is put into play, the person whose soul was sealed within it emerges from the card. Although the gang manages to save each other, they lose life points rapidly. Yami Bakura draws the Change of Heart magic card and plans on using it to possess Yugi, but the real Bakura unexpectedly emerges from the card and quickly possesses one of his own monsters instead. He then tells Yugi to destroy him in order to save the others, but Yami Yugi uses the Millennium Puzzle to simultaneously put the real Bakura's soul back into his body while also transferring Yami Bakura into the possessed monster, enabling Yugi to defeat Yami Bakura and send him to the card graveyard while also enabling the gang to escape the Shadow Game, with Joey, Téa, and Tristan being convinced that the entire duel was nothing more than a dream.
| 14 | 14 | "The Light at the End of the Tunnel" / "Pitch-Black Duel! The Castle Hidden in the Darkness"; Transliteration: "Shikkoku no Dyueru! Yami Kuramashi no Shiro" (Japanese: 漆黒のデュエル! 闇晦ましの城) | Masashi Sogo | July 25, 2000 | February 2, 2002 |
Yugi and the others learn that Mai has been defeated by Panik, one of the Duelist Kingdom Eliminators, and faces being axed from the tournament for losing all her star chips. Yugi volunteers to duel Panik and win back Mai's star chips.: The American version was combined into one episode called "Panik Attack".; All other countries received the episode in its two-part form, which was also released on VHS and DVD in the US, but it eventually aired on 4Kids TV on January 6, 2007.
| 15 | 15 | "Winning Through Intimidation" / "Cut Through the Darkness! Sealing Swords of Light"; Transliteration: "Yami o Kirisake! Hikari no Gofūken" (Japanese: 闇を切り裂け! 光の護封剣(ごふうけん)) | Masashi Sogo | August 1, 2000 | February 2, 2002 |
Yugi unleashes his trump card, the Swords of Revealing Light, which illuminate Panik's side of the field and unmask his monsters. Yugi eventually wins the duel (and by extension, Mai's star chips back) and soon dispatches Panik with his "Mind Crush" ability after the latter had tried to burn Yugi alive with the use of his flamethrowers.: The American version was combined into one episode called "Panik Attack".; All other countries received the episode in its two-part form, which was also released on VHS and DVD in the US. Eventually it aired on 4Kids TV on January 13, 2007 as "Winning Through Intimidation".
| 16 | 16 | "The Scars of Defeat" / "Clash! Blue-Eyes vs. Red-Eyes"; Transliteration: "Gekitotsu! Burūaizu VS Reddoaizu" (Japanese: 激突! ブルーアイズVSレッドアイズ) | Junki Takegami | August 8, 2000 | February 9, 2002 |
Yugi and Bakura notice that Bakura's mystical Ring is glowing and pointing straight towards Pegasus' castle as it detects Pegasus' Millennium Eye from within. The gang's sleep is interrupted by the arrival of Seto Kaiba, with the intent of confronting Pegasus and rescuing his younger brother Mokuba, Joey rashly challenges him to a duel, but almost effortlessly loses.
| 17 | 17 | "Arena of Lost Souls, Part 1" / "Terror! Call of the Living Dead"; Transliteration: "Kyōfu! Ribingu Deddo no Yobi Koe" (Japanese: 恐怖! リビングデッドの呼び声) | Shin Yoshida | August 15, 2000 | February 16, 2002 |
Still smarting from his defeat by Kaiba, Joey vows to prove that he isn't a "whimpering dog" and ends up being forced into a duel with Bonz, one of a gang of duelists led by the ruthless Bandit Keith.
| 18 | 18 | "Arena of Lost Souls, Part 2" / "Shield in the Right Hand, Sword in the Left Hand"; Transliteration: "Migi Te ni Tate o Hidari Te ni Ken o" (Japanese: 右手に盾を左手に剣を) | Shin Yoshida | August 22, 2000 | February 23, 2002 |
Joey is fighting a losing battle against Bonz's Zombie Monsters, who have the ability to come back to life and become much stronger whenever they're destroyed. Yugi and the others are determined to find Joey and soon reunites with him in due time. Despite the odds stacked against him, Joey manages to win the duel against Bonz.
| 19 | 19 | "Double Trouble Duel, Part 1" / "Tag Duel in the Labyrinth"; Transliteration: "Meikyū no Taggu Dyueru" (Japanese: 迷宮のタッグ・デュエル) | Masashi Sogo | August 29, 2000 | March 16, 2002 |
Yugi and his friends are trapped in the caves by Bandit Keith and his gang, with the latter soon betraying his own henchmen afterwards and stealing their remaining star chips so that he can enter into Pegasus' castle. Lost in the caves, Bakura's Millennium Ring begins glowing again as it detects the Millennium Eye still. Bakura uses its magic to guide them, eventually having to admit that the Shadow Game between him and Yami Yugi, in which Joey, Téa, and Tristan thought was just a dream, had indeed transpired. While searching for a way out of the caverns, they come across a room guarded by the identical Paradox Twins. Before the gang can progress, Yugi and Joey must face the Twins in a quartet duel where their Monsters must negotiate a trap-filled maze. Meanwhile, Kaiba is making his own way to Pegasus' fortress, determined to find and save his younger brother Mokuba.
| 20 | 20 | "Double Trouble Duel, Part 2" / "Fusion of Three Gods! Gate Guardian"; Transliteration: "Mikami Gattai! Gēto GĀdian" (Japanese: 三神合体! ゲート・ガーディアン) | Masashi Sogo | September 9, 2000 | March 23, 2002 |
To get their respective monsters through the identical Paradox Twins' maze, Yugi and Joey must work as a team, but the devious twins attempt to divide and conquer by changing the layout of the maze so that Yugi's Monsters become separated from Joey's own. From there, the identical twins start assembling the pieces they need to form the much stronger Gate Guardian in an attempt to defeat both Yugi and Joey. Meanwhile, Kaiba is able to get into Pegasus' castle and wastes no time in searching for Mokuba, but unknown to Kaiba, Pegasus is watching him with a sinister eye and decides to initiate a plan of his own in order to delay Kaiba further.
| 21 | 21 | "Double Trouble Duel, Part 3" / "Devil Dragon! Black Demons Dragon"; Transliteration: "Akuma Ryū! Burakku Dēmonzu Doragon" (Japanese: 悪魔竜! ブラック・デーモンズ・ドラゴン) | Masashi Sogo | September 12, 2000 | March 30, 2002 |
In a bid to defeat the Gate Guardian, Yugi uses Polymerization to fuse his Summoned Skull to Joey's Red Eyes Black Dragon, creating the Black Skull Dragon. Through the combined effort of their unified teamwork, Yugi and Joey defeat the identical Paradox Twins, winning enough star chips to allow them inside Pegasus' castle. Also, Yugi and his friends manage to escape the caves after solving a riddle posed to them by the Twins. Meanwhile, Kaiba is able to find Mokuba from within his search, but Pegasus suddenly appears and uses his Millennium Eye to steal Mokuba's soul. After doing this, Pegasus then gives Kaiba an ultimatum: Kaiba must first defeat Yugi in a duel so that the former can gain the right to face Pegasus himself in an attempt to win back his brother's soul.
| 22 | 22 | "Face Off, Part 1" / "The Destined Duel! Yugi vs. Kaiba"; Transliteration: "Shukumei no Dyueru! Yūgi VS Kaiba" (Japanese: 宿命のデュエル! 遊戯VS海馬) | Junki Takegami | September 19, 2000 | April 6, 2002 |
Arriving at Pegasus' castle, Yugi and the others are confronted by Kaiba, who challenges Yugi to a duel as a part of Pegasus' past ultimatum towards Kaiba. As the two duelists face off on the castle roof, Kaiba hatches a plan to fuse all three of his Blue-Eyes White Dragons and create the Blue-Eyes Ultimate Dragon.
| 23 | 23 | "Face Off, Part 2" / "Strongest! Splendid! Ultimate Dragon"; Transliteration: "Saikyō! Karei! Burūaizu Arutimetto Doragon" (Japanese: 最強! 華麗! 究極竜(ブルーアイズ・アルティメットドラゴン)) | Junki Takegami | September 26, 2000 | April 13, 2002 |
The duel between Kaiba and Yugi continues. Kaiba tricks Yugi into releasing the Crush Card virus, rendering every Monster in Yugi's deck with more than 1500 Attack points unplayable.
| 24 | 24 | "Face Off, Part 3" / "Multiplying Kuriboh! The Shocking Conclusion"; Transliteration: "Kuribō Zōshoku! Kyōgaku no Ketsumatsu" (Japanese: クリボー増殖! 驚愕の結末) | Junki Takegami | October 3, 2000 | April 20, 2002 |
Yugi plays a Kuriboh/Multiply combo to protect his Life Points and uses his Living Arrow and Polymerization magic cards to fuse his Mammoth Graveyard to Kaiba's Blue Eyes Ultimate Dragon. This causes the Ultimate Dragon to decay and lose Attack points until it is weak enough for Yugi to attack. Refusing to lose from within a desperate state, Kaiba unexpectedly stands on a turret and warns Yugi that if he attacks, the impact force of the monsters battling will knock Kaiba off the castle and kill him. An internal conflict soon takes place between Yugi and Yami Yugi which causes the real Yugi to quickly stop his Celtic Guardian from attacking the Ultimate Dragon, enabling Kaiba to swiftly counterattack and win the duel so that he can gain the right to face Pegasus.
| 25 | 25 | "Shining Friendship" / "A Duel of Tears! Friendship"; Transliteration: "Namida no Dyueru! Furendoshippu" (Japanese: 涙のデュエル! フレンドシップ) | Masashi Sogo | October 10, 2000 | April 27, 2002 |
After losing half of his star chips to Kaiba, Yugi becomes depressed. He is also worried by the fact that Yami had wanted him to win the duel, even though it meant killing Kaiba. In a bid to help him, Téa, despite her lack of experience in Duel Monsters, volunteers to duel Mai, who has more than enough star chips to qualify for the finals and is more than willing to give her extra star chips to Yugi if Téa is able to defeat her. After a bad start, Téa eventually manages to win via Mai forfeiting the duel after seeing Téa's strong resolve and determination to help Yugi out and through this, Yugi is able to regain enough star chips so that he can enter Pegasus' castle while personally vowing to face and defeat Pegasus with his own strong resolve and determination.
| 26 | 26 | "Champion vs. Creator, Part 1" / "Save Mokuba! Kaiba vs. Pegasus"; Transliteration: "Mokuba o Sukue! Kaiba VS Pegasasu" (Japanese: モクバを救え! 海馬VSペガサス) | Shin Yoshida | October 17, 2000 | May 18, 2002 |
Yugi and the others enter Pegasus' castle, where they learn that Kaiba is about to duel Pegasus in an attempt to win back young Mokuba's soul. As the duel gets underway, it becomes clear that Pegasus is using the strong mental/psionic abilities of his Millennium Eye to anticipate Kaiba's moves and see every card in his hand.
| 27 | 27 | "Champion vs. Creator, Part 2" / "Kaiba Falters! The Invincible Toon World"; Transliteration: "Kaiba Chiru! Muteki no Tūn Wārudo" (Japanese: 海馬散る! 無敵のトゥーンワールド) | Shin Yoshida | October 24, 2000 | May 25, 2002 |
Pegasus unleashes his secret weapon, the Toon World card, which he uses to turn one of Kaiba's Blue-Eyes White Dragons into the Blue-Eyes Toon Dragon. When Kaiba tries to counter with one of his other Blue-Eyes, it emerges that Toon Monsters have the ability to dodge any attack. Faced with a card so powerful that it was never put into circulation, Kaiba loses the duel and ends up having his own spirit/essence mystically stolen by Pegasus' Millennium Eye.
| 28 | 28 | "The Night Before" / "The Night Before the Finals! Pegasus's Secret"; Transliteration: "Kessen Senya! Pegasasu no Himitsu" (Japanese: 決戦前夜! ペガサスの秘密) | Masashi Sogo | October 31, 2000 | August 17, 2002 |
The line-up for the Duelist Kingdom semi-finals is determined: Mai will battle Yugi in the first match while Joey faces off against Bandit Keith in the second match. Once everyone is settled in for the night, Tristan, Téa, and Bakura set out to find on how Pegasus had "cheated" in his match against Kaiba. They are soon trapped by Pegasus in an underground chamber and he is about to claim their souls when Yami Bakura unexpectedly emerges and blasts Pegasus with the power of his Millennium Ring. He then tricks everyone into thinking that the entire ordeal was just a dream while secretly planning his own revenge against Yami Yugi. Meanwhile, Yugi speaks to his Grandpa in a dream of his own and is warned by him that Pegasus must be stopped before he risks causing Armageddon to the entire world and its people.
| 29 | 29 | "Duel Identity, Part 1" / "A Desperate Situation! Seductive Shadow"; Transliteration: "Zettai Zetsumei! Yūwaku no Shadō" (Japanese: 絶体絶命! 誘惑のシャドウ) | Shin Yoshida | November 7, 2000 | August 24, 2002 |
The semi-finals begin, with Yugi facing off against Mai. Yugi is still emotionally affected by his duel with Kaiba and Mai appears to be winning the duel, due to Yugi's internal struggle with Yami Yugi's attempt to take over and successfully win against her.
| 30 | 30 | "Duel Identity, Part 2" / "The Ultimate Legendary Soldier – Chaos Soldier Descends"; Transliteration: "Densetsu no Saikyō Kenshi: Kaosu Sorujā Kōrin" (Japanese: 伝説の最強戦士 カオス・ソルジャー降臨) | Shin Yoshida | November 14, 2000 | August 31, 2002 |
After Yugi and Yami Yugi make an internal compromise to each other and vow to work together as a team, Yugi starts to make a comeback against Mai, taking control of her Harpie's Pet Dragon and using his own Catapult Turtle to fire it at her Mirror Wall. Mai multiplies her Harpie Lady and revives Harpie's Pet Dragon, which gets a power boost for every Harpie Lady in play. Yugi manages to summon the Black Luster Soldier and defeats Mai from within their duel via Mai surrendering, sending Yugi straight to the finals of the Duelist Kingdom tournament.
| 31 | 31 | "Keith's Machinations, Part 1" / "Cruel – Heavy Metal Deck"; Transliteration: "Kyōaku Hevi Metaru Dekki" (Japanese: 凶悪 重機械(ヘヴィメタル)デッキ) | Shin Yoshida | November 21, 2000 | September 7, 2002 |
Just minutes before he is due to duel Bandit Keith in the second match of the Duelist Kingdom tournament's semi-finals, Joey finds that his entry card is missing. Unaware that Bandit Keith had secretly stole it from last night, Joey runs back to his room so that he can look for it to no avail. Just when it seems that all hope is lost for Joey, Mai unexpectedly gives him her entry card right before her departure from Duelist Kingdom and the duel itself is able to go ahead.
| 32 | 32 | "Keith's Machinations, Part 2" / "Travel Through Time! Red-Eyes Black Metal Dragon"; Transliteration: "Toki o Koero! Reddoaizu Burakku Metaru Doragon" (Japanese: 時を超えろ! レッドアイズ・ブラックメタルドラゴン) | Shin Yoshida | November 28, 2000 | September 7, 2002 |
Joey transforms his Red-Eyes Black Dragon into the Red-Eyes Black Metal Dragon, enabling him to take out the strongest Monster in Bandit Keith's deck, the Barrel Dragon, but Joey still has to deal with Bandit Keith's Slot Machine, in which Bandit Keith is powering up with the 7 Completed magic cards he has hidden under his right wristband. Joey emerges triumphant against Bandit Keith, who is then thrown out of the castle and dropped into the sea for dishonest ways.
| 33 | 33 | "Best of Friends, Best of Duelists, Part 1" / "Final Game of Friendship! – Yugi vs. Jonouchi (Part 1)"; Transliteration: "Yūjō no Kesshōsen: Yūgi VS Jōnouchi (Zenpen)" (Japanese: 友情の決勝戦 遊戯VS城之内 (前編)) | Masashi Sogo | December 5, 2000 | September 14, 2002 |
Yugi and Joey, who have been helpful and supportive of each other from within the start of the Duelist Kingdom tournament, must now face-off against one another from within the finals in order to see on who will win the tournament and face-off against Pegasus when all is said and done.
| 34 | 34 | "Best of Friends, Best of Duelists, Part 2" / "Final Game of Friendship! – Yugi vs. Jonouchi (Part 2)"; Transliteration: "Yūjō no Kesshōsen: Yūgi VS Jōnouchi (Kōhen)" (Japanese: 友情の決勝戦 遊戯VS城之内 (後編)) | Masashi Sogo | December 12, 2000 | September 14, 2002 |
Yugi defeats the Black Skull Dragon (which Joey had summoned in the previous episode by fusing his Red-Eyes Black Dragon and Yugi's Summoned Skull) by using a combination of the Dark Magician, Magical Hats, Spellbinding Circle and Book of Secret Arts. Joey responds with his Baby Dragon/Time Wizard combo in a bid to overcome Yugi's strong offense against him, but in the end, he loses to Yugi. Despite this, Joey is thankful to Yugi for giving him a great match and vows to be by his side, along with Téa, Tristan, and Bakura for his upcoming duel against Pegasus.
| 35 | 35 | "Yugi vs. Pegasus: Match of the Millennium, Part 1" / "Final Duel! Yugi vs. Pegasus"; Transliteration: "Fainaru Dyueru! Yūgi VS Pegasasu" (Japanese: 最終決闘(ファイナルデュエル)! 遊戯VSペガサス) | Junki Takegami | December 19, 2000 | September 21, 2002 |
Yugi prepares himself for his long-awaited and fated battle against Pegasus with the souls of Grandpa, Kaiba, and Mokuba on the line. Meanwhile, Tristan and Bakura infiltrate the castle to find the Kaiba brothers in an attempt to cripple Pegasus' current plan.
| 36 | 36 | "Yugi vs. Pegasus: Match of the Millennium, Part 2" / "Attacks Ineffective!? The Invincible Toon Army"; Transliteration: "Kōryaku Funō!? Muteki no Tūn Gundan" (Japanese: 攻略不能!? 無敵のトゥーン軍団) | Junki Takegami | December 26, 2000 | September 21, 2002 |
Pegasus punishes Yugi by using the same Toon Deck and mind-reading abilities that he had previously used on Kaiba. As Pegasus turns Yugi's monsters against him, Yugi loses both the will and resolve to battle. Yugi is personally worried that Pegasus might seal his soul into a card, just like what he had done before to both Kaiba and Mokuba.
| 37 | 37 | "Yugi vs. Pegasus: Match of the Millennium, Part 3" / "The Counterattack Begins! Mind Shuffle"; Transliteration: "Hangeki Kaishi! Maindo Shaffuru" (Japanese: 反撃開始! マインドシャッフル) | Junki Takegami | January 9, 2001 | September 28, 2002 |
Yugi has found an ingenious way to counter Pegasus' mind-reading ability: Yugi switches back and forth between his two separate spirits and through this, Yugi is able to destroy Pegasus' Toon World, but Pegasus soon transports the duel to the Shadow Realm, where the situation itself becomes much harder for both Yugi and Yami Yugi. Meanwhile, Tristan is horrified to learn that Bakura is once again possessed by the evil spirit of Yami Bakura.
| 38 | 38 | "Yugi vs. Pegasus: Match of the Millennium, Part 4" / "The Evil Eye Activates – Sacrifice"; Transliteration: "Jagan Hatsudō: Sakurifaisu" (Japanese: 邪眼発動 サクリファイス) | Junki Takegami | January 16, 2001 | September 28, 2002 |
Yami Bakura is after Mokuba's body so that his evil spirit can possess it. Tristan, however, knocks out Yami Bakura and throws away the Millennium Ring containing the evil spirit into the forest below. Meanwhile, Pegasus summons Relinquished, a fearsome monster that uses its enemies as shields. Yugi crumples in a complete state of both fatigue and exhaustion, under the crippling strain of maintaining his own monsters in the Shadow Game. Joey, Téa, and Tristan all yell desperate encouragement in an attempt to help their friends out, but their own voices cannot penetrate the sphere of darkness. Yami Yugi is the only one who can duel now, but unfortunately, he is at the mercy of Pegasus' Millennium Eye.
| 39 | 39 | "Yugi vs. Pegasus: Match of the Millennium, Part 5" / "Fusion of Light and Darkness – Black Chaos Descends"; Transliteration: "Hikari to Yami no Yūgō: Burakku Kaosu Kōrin" (Japanese: 光と闇の融合 ブラックカオス降臨) | Junki Takegami | January 23, 2001 | October 5, 2002 |
Pegasus' Relinquished has captured Yugi's Dark Magician, and his time bomb monster is ready to blow it to bits and take out the rest of Yugi's life points. However, Yami Yugi captures Relinquished using a Mind Control card. Then, with the last card Yugi played face-down, he performs a Dark Magic Ritual, sacrificing the Dark Magician as well as Pegasus' time bomb to summon the Magician of Black Chaos. Pegasus counters by fusing Relinquished with Thousand Eyes Idol, creating Thousand Eyes Restrict. The Thousand Eyes Restrict paralyzes the Magician of Black Chaos, but Yami Yugi uses Kuriboh combined with his Multiply magic card. The Kuribohs explode on contact, blinding Thousand Eyes Restrict and freeing the Magician of Black Chaos to attack. Yami Yugi destroys Thousand Eyes Restrict and ends the duel as the victor. While Yugi, Joey, Téa, and Tristan celebrate the former's triumphant victory, Pegasus silently slips away and releases the spirits that he had stolen, honoring his word of the agreement that he had made with Yugi right before the start of their duel. Bakura is seemingly back to normal and volunteers to take care of an unconscious Mokuba while the others go look and search for Pegasus.
| 40 | 40 | "Aftermath" / "King of Duelists"; Transliteration: "Kingu obu Dyuerisuto" (Japanese: キング オブ デュエリスト) | Junki Takegami | January 30, 2001 | October 5, 2002 |
Pegasus is found badly injured with his Millennium Eye missing. Tea reads Pegasus' diary and the gang learns on how Pegasus had got his Millennium Eye and the reason of why he had held the Duelist Kingdom tournament. A mysterious Egyptian soon shows up looking for the person that had stolen Pegasus' Millennium Eye. Seeing that Yugi has a Millennium item as well, he thinks that he might be responsible. The Egyptian uses his Millennium Key to enter into Yugi's mind. There he finds two chambers; one is covered in children's toys, while the other is mysterious, disconcerting and confusing. When the Egyptian falls victim to a trap in the latter chamber, Yugi comes to his rescue. The two journey deeper and are confronted by the Dark Magician. Yugi commands him to back down, causing the Egyptian to realize that Yugi is "the Chosen One". The Egyptian soon departs leaving Yugi with his name, Shadi, as well as questions about the seven Millennium Items. The Kaiba brothers are later reunited with Kaiba thanking Yugi and his friends for helping him and Mokuba out. As everyone leaves the island, it is soon revealed that Yami Bakura had found his way back to his host and challenged Pegasus to a Shadow Game and took his Millennium Eye, and that the real Bakura had no memory of the possession, with Yami Bakura secretly promising that he will have his personal vengeance towards Yami Yugi.
| 41 | 41 | "The Wrath of Rebecca" / "The Girl from America"; Transliteration: "Amerika kara Kita Shōjo" (Japanese: アメリカからきた少女) | Masashi Sogo | February 6, 2001 | October 12, 2002 |
Upon returning home, Yugi is emotionally happy to see that his Grandpa has awaken from his coma thanks to his soul being restored by Pegasus and that Yugi himself is personally satisfied to know that his mission to save his Grandpa was a complete success. A few weeks later, Yugi and his friends soon meet a young girl named Rebecca Hawkins who demands that Yugi's Grandpa return his Blue-Eyes White Dragon to her. Rebecca claims that Yugi's Grandpa had stole the card from her own grandfather many years ago and challenges Yugi to a duel in an attempt to get it back.
| 42 | 42 | "The Ties of Friendship" / "The All-Powerful Shadow Ghoul"; Transliteration: "Hissatsu no Shadō Gūru" (Japanese: 必殺のシャドーグール) | Masashi Sogo | February 13, 2001 | October 12, 2002 |
The duel between Rebecca and Yugi continues until Yugi forfeits the match. Rebecca's grandfather appears and reveals that Yugi could have won the duel by playing Soul Release, but forfeited the match for his friendship with Rebecca, as Yugi's grandfather did for Rebecca's grandfather. He explains that Yugi's grandfather won his Blue-Eyes White Dragon monster card in a duel, rather than stealing it.
Legendary Heroes
| 43 | 43 | "Legendary Heroes, Part 1" / "Big 5's Trap – Duel Monsters Quest"; Transliteration: "Biggu Faibu no Wana: Dyueru Monsutāzu Kuesto" (Japanese: ビッグ5の罠 デュエルモンスターズクエスト) | Shin Yoshida | February 20, 2001 | October 19, 2002 |
KaibaCorp's two-faced Board of Directors, known as the Big Five, trap Kaiba inside a virtual reality game. Mokuba recruits Yugi and Joey in order to help free Kaiba and stop the Big Five from seizing control of KaibaCorp.
| 44 | 44 | "Legendary Heroes, Part 2" / "DM Quest 2: The Legendary Hero – Yugi"; Transliteration: "DM Kuesuto 2: Densetsu no Yūsha – Yūgi" (Japanese: DMクエスト② 伝説の勇者 遊戯) | Shin Yoshida | February 27, 2001 | October 19, 2002 |
The quest to locate Kaiba continues with help from Mai, who was offered a past deal by the Big Five to help test Kaiba's virtual reality game.
| 45 | 45 | "Legendary Heroes, Part 3" / "DM Quest 3: Master of Dragon Knight"; Transliteration: "DM Kuesuto 3: Masutā obu Doragon Naito" (Japanese: DMクエスト③ マスター・オブ・ドラゴンナイト) | Shin Yoshida | March 6, 2001 | October 26, 2002 |
Yugi, Joey, Mai, and Mokuba are able to rescue Kaiba, but they are still stuck in the game. The only exit is past a Five-Headed Dragon which is being controlled by the Big Five via transferring their own virtual minds straight into it. From within the battle, Joey, Mokuba, and Mai lose all of their life points and are apparently deleted from the game, with their own virtual minds seemingly deleted as well. Yugi and Kaiba, two rivals and opponents, work together to defeat the dragon, thus deleting the virtual minds of the Big Five. Joey, Mai, and Mokuba are revived thanks to the restoration power of the Mystical Elf and the three of them, along with Yugi and Kaiba, escape the game so that they can return to the real world.
Dungeon Dice Monsters
| 46 | 46 | "Dungeon Dice Monsters, Part 1" / "The Mysterious Transfer Student – Ryuji Otogi"; Transliteration: "Nazo no Tenkōsei: Otogi Ryūji" (Japanese: 謎の転校生 御伽龍児) | Junki Takegami | March 13, 2001 | November 2, 2002 |
A new student named Duke Devlin defeats Joey in a game of Duel Monsters and forces Joey to become his reluctant servant. Duke orders Joey to wear a dog costume and humiliates him in public, leading Yugi to challenge Duke to a duel in order to free Joey from his enslavement. Duke accepts Yugi's challenge, but tells him that instead of playing Duel Monsters, the two of them will be playing a game called Dungeon Dice Monsters, which Duke created himself.
| 47 | 47 | "Dungeon Dice Monsters, Part 2" / "Showdown! Dungeon Dice Monsters" (Japanese: 対決! ダンジョンダイスモンスターズ) | Junki Takegami | March 20, 2001 | November 2, 2002 |
In exchange for Joey's freedom, Yugi agrees to give up Duel Monsters forever if he loses. Unfamiliar with the rules of Dungeon Dice Monsters, Yugi gets off to a bad start. Duke reveals that he had designed Dungeon Dice Monsters with Pegasus' aid and also tells Yugi that he seeks revenge against him for cheating against Pegasus during their past duel. Yugi denies that he cheated against Pegasus, but Duke does not listen.
| 48 | 48 | "Dungeon Dice Monsters, Part 3" / "Yugi's Tough Battle – God Orgoth's Fierce Assault"; Transliteration: "Yūgi Kusen: Goddo Ōgasu no Mōkō" (Japanese: 遊戯苦戦 ゴッドオーガスの猛攻) | Junki Takegami | March 27, 2001 | November 9, 2002 |
Yugi manages to get ahead of Duke in the duel, but falls victim to an unfamiliar rule which prevents him from summoning any more monsters.
| 49 | 49 | "Dungeon Dice Monsters, Part 4" / "The Miracle Dimension – The Black Magician Is Summoned"; Transliteration: "Kiseki no Dimenshon: Burakku Majishan Shōkan" (Japanese: 奇跡のディメンジョン ブラックマジシャン召喚) | Junki Takegami | April 3, 2001 | November 9, 2002 |
After Duke's all-powerful Orgoth the Relentless slices and dices Yugi's entire cadre of monsters to shreds, Yugi only has one turn left before he loses all of his heart points. Nevertheless, he manages to win the duel and free Joey from his humiliating punishment. Duke is humbled by his loss and admits that Yugi defeated Pegasus fairly, becoming friends with him.

== DVD releases ==
The first ten DVD volumes, as well as volumes 12 and 13, contain 3 episodes each. Volumes 11, 15, and 16 contain four episodes each and the fourteenth volume contains two episodes. The first volume was released on September 24, 2002. The complete first season set was released on August 10, 2004.

| Volume | Discs | Episodes | Region 1 release |
|---|---|---|---|
| 1: The Heart of the Cards | 1 | 3 | September 24, 2002 |
| 2: Into the Hornet's Nest | 1 | 3 | September 24, 2002 |
| 3: Attack from the Deep | 1 | 3 | November 5, 2002 |
| 4: Give Up the Ghost | 1 | 3 | November 5, 2002 |
| 5: Evil Spirit of the Ring | 1 | 3 | January 14, 2003 |
| 6: The Scars of Defeat | 1 | 3 | January 14, 2003 |
| 7: Double Trouble Duel | 1 | 3 | March 18, 2003 |
| 8: Face Off | 1 | 3 | March 18, 2003 |
| 9: Champion vs. Creator | 1 | 3 | May 6, 2003 |
| 10: Duel Identity | 1 | 3 | May 6, 2003 |
| 11: Best of Friends, Best of Duelists | 1 | 4 | July 22, 2003 |
| 12: Match of the Millennium, Part 1 | 1 | 3 | August 19, 2003 |
| 13: Match of the Millennium, Part 2 | 1 | 3 | September 16, 2003 |
| 14: Legendary Heroes | 1 | 2 | October 14, 2003 |
| 15: Ties of Friendship | 1 | 4 | October 14, 2003 |
| 16: Dungeon Dice Monsters | 1 | 4 | November 18, 2003 |
| Complete First Season | 6 | 49 | August 10, 2004 |
| 1: The Shadow Games (Uncut) | 1 | 3 | October 19, 2004 |
| 2: The Insector Combo (Uncut) | 1 | 3 | October 19, 2004 |
| 3: Stolen: Blue-Eyes White Dragon (Uncut) | 1 | 3 | February 22, 2005 |
