= Everything's Relative =

Everything's Relative may refer to:

- Everything's Relative (1965 game show)
- Everything's Relative (1987 TV series)
- Everything's Relative (Yu-Gi-Oh!)
- Everything's Relative (1999 TV series)
