= Amy Birnbaum =

American voice actress (born 1975)

- Born: April 14, 1975 (age 51); United States
- Education: Tufts University (BA)
- Occupation: Voice actress
- Years active: 1997–present
- Children: 2
- Website: www.amy-birnbaum.com

Amy Birnbaum (born April 14, 1975) is an American voice actress, who works on the properties of 4Kids Entertainment.

== Career ==
She has done many voiceovers for cartoons, mainly dubbing for English versions of anime. Her works can be found in anime dubs such as Pokémon, Yu-Gi-Oh!, Kirby: Right Back at Ya!, Magical DoReMi, and G.I. Joe: Sigma 6. Overall, Birnbaum is best known for voicing Téa Gardner in Yu-Gi-Oh!, and Charmy Bee in the Sonic the Hedgehog video game series from 2005 to 2009 starting with Sonic X.

== Personal life ==
Birnbaum is married and has two children. She is a graduate of Tufts University.

== Filmography ==
=== Film ===
Year	Title	Role	Notes
1999–2006	Pokémon film series	Max, Melody, Molly Hale, Dundee, Additional voices	
2001	Night on the Galactic Railroad	Tadashi	English dub
2004	Yu-Gi-Oh! The Movie: Pyramid of Light	Téa Gardner	English dub
2016	Yu-Gi-Oh!: The Dark Side of Dimensions	Téa Gardner	English dub

=== Anime ===
Year	Title	Role	Notes
1997	Magic Knight Rayearth	Umi Ryuzaki (OVA)	English dub
1998–2006	Pokémon	DJ Mary, Max (Seasons 6–8), Additional voices	
1999–2000	Magical DoReMi	Additional voices	
2001–2002	Shaman King	Lilly of the Lily Five, Lady Nyorai	
2000–2004	Yu-Gi-Oh!	Téa Gardner (Anzu Mazaki), Bonz (Ghost Kotsuzuka)	
2001–2004	Cubix: Robots for Everyone	Chip	
2002–2006	Kirby: Right Back at Ya!	Kirby (ADR only), Spikehead	
2003–2005	F-Zero: GP Legend	Lucy Liberty	
2003–2006	Sonic X	Charmy Bee, Cosmo, Helen, Froggy	
2007	One Piece	Miss Father's Day	4Kids dub

=== Animation ===
Year	Title	Role	Notes
2005–2006	G.I. Joe: Sigma 6	Scarlett	

=== Video games ===
Year	Title	Role	Notes
1999	I Spy Spooky Mansion	Skelly The Skeleton	
2003	I Spy Fantasy	Princess	
2004	Yu-Gi-Oh! Capsule Monster Coliseum	Téa Gardner	
2005	Shadow the Hedgehog	Charmy Bee	
2009	FusionFall	Computress	
2016	Yu-Gi-Oh! Duel Links	Téa Gardner, Bonz	
