= Tadashi Miyazawa =

Japanese voice actor

Tadashi Miyazawa 宮澤 正
- Born: July 12, 1955 (age 71); Nagano, Japan
- Occupation: Voice actor
- Years active: 1975-present
- Agent: KeKKe
- Notable credit: Yu-Gi-Oh! Duel Monsters as Sugoroku Mutou

Tadashi Miyazawa (宮澤 正, Miyazawa Tadashi; born July 12, 1955) is a Japanese voice actor. He is from Nagano, Japan. He is part of the talent agency KeKKe.

== Notable voice roles ==
=== Anime ===
- Bakkyuu HIT! Crash Bedaman (Mysterious old man)
- Beast Wars II: Chō Seimeitai Transformers (Autostinger, Coelagon)
- Eyeshield 21 ("Doc" Billy Horide)
- Fullmetal Alchemist: Brotherhood (Giolio Comanche)
- Ginga Densetsu Weed (Kurotora)
- Hunter × Hunter (1999) (Zeno Zoldyck)
- The iDOLM@STER (Uncle)
- Immortal Grand Prix (Benjamin Bright)
- JoJo's Bizarre Adventure (Dario Brando)
- Koutetsu Sangokushi (Harishou Shifu)
- Kujibiki♥Unbalance (Fernandez)
- Pocket Monsters: Diamond and Pearl (Village headman)
- PoPoLoCrois (Chinsan)
- Pupipō! (Bakuzan-sensei)
- Shura no Toki - Age of Chaos (Gohei, Sasuke)
- Sisters of Wellber (Jamo)
- Stitch! (Abekoobe's father)
- Yakitate!! Japan (Master)
- Yomigaeru Sora - Rescue Wings (Takanobu Tsunematsu)
- Yu-Gi-Oh! Duel Monsters (Sugoroku Mutou, Siamun Muran)
- Yu-Gi-Oh! Duel Monsters GX (Sugoroku Mutou)
- Macross Frontier (Richard Bilrer)

=== OVAs ===
- Azusa, Otetsudai Shimasu! (Drink shop owner)
- Rockman: Irregular Hunter X (Dr. Cain)

=== Films ===
- Beast Wars II: The Movie (Autostinger, Coelagon)
- Yu-Gi-Oh! The Movie: Pyramid of Light (Sugoroku Mutou)
- Yu-Gi-Oh! 3D: Bonds Beyond Time (Sugoroku Mutou)
- Yo-kai Watch Shadowside: Oni-ō no Fukkatsu (Papa Bolt)

=== Video games ===
- Hyrule Warriors (Wizzro)
- Rockman X3 (Dr. Cain)
- Sengoku Basara series (Hōjō Ujimasa)
- Super Robot Wars series (Baran Doban, Magnaz Ald)
- Xenoblade Chronicles (Miqol)

=== Drama CDs ===
- Konoyo Ibun Series 3: Kitsune No Yomeiri (Kurayo)

=== Dubbing roles ===
==== Live-action ====
- Harry Potter and the Deathly Hallows – Part 1 – Griphook (Warwick Davis)
- Harry Potter and the Deathly Hallows – Part 2 – Griphook (Warwick Davis)
- Journey 2: The Mysterious Island – Gabato Laguatan (Luis Guzmán)
- Mary Poppins Returns – Mr. Binnacle (Jim Norton)

==== Animation ====
- Barbie in the Nutcracker – Mouse King
- Corpse Bride – Mayhew
- The Cramp Twins – Tony Parsons
- The Nuttiest Nutcracker – Reginald the Mouse King
- Steven Universe – Uncle Grandpa
- SWAT Kats: The Radical Squadron – Chance Furlong/T-Bone
- Transformers – Starscream
- Transformers: Revenge of the Fallen – Starscream
- Transformers: Dark of the Moon – Starscream
- Uncle Grandpa – Uncle Grandpa
