= Ryō Naitō =

Japanese voice actor (born 1974)

- 内藤 玲
- Born: June 22, 1974 (age 51); Osaka Prefecture, Japan
- Occupation: Voice actor
- Years active: 1990–present
- Website: www.oginext.com/men/naito.html

Ryō Naitō (内藤 玲, Naitō Ryō; born June 22, 1974 in the Osaka Prefecture) is a Japanese voice actor. He is affiliated with Y.M.O., specifically under the Love Love division, which focuses on voice acting. His given name Ryō, is sometimes mistakenly translated as Rei.

== Voice roles ==
=== Anime ===
- Assassination Classroom (Taiga Okajima)
- Assassination Classroom 2nd Season (Taiga Okajima)
- Beast Wars II (Ikard, DJ)
- Beast Wars Neo (Hydra)
- Cromartie High School (Yutaka Takenouchi)
- Death Note (Tota Matsuda)
- Ginga Legend Weed (Buru)
- Gyagu Manga Biyori (Various Roles)
- Hell Girl (Shinichi Muroi)
- Hunter x Hunter (Yamainu)
- Kill la Kill (Kusanosuke Yaguruma)
- Kodocha (Rei Sagami)
- Legendz (Ed)
- Les Misérables: Shōjo Cosette (Laigle)
- Medarot (Hikaru Agata)
- Monster Rancher (Allen)
- Ojarumaru (Katapi)
- PaRappa The Rapper (Gaster)
- Pokémon (Nando)
- Prince of Tennis (Koharu Konjiki, various voices)
- Reborn! (Ken Joushima)
- Sexy Commando Gaiden: Sugoiyo!! Masaru-san (Kojirou Satou a.k.a. Afro)
- Sugar Sugar Rune (Hiroshi)
- Suzuka (Kenji Kobayakawa)
- Transformers: Robots in Disguise (Mirage, Slapper)
- Yu-Gi-Oh! Duel Monsters (Ryuuji Otogi)
- Yu-Gi-Oh! 5D's (Jean)

=== Drama CDs ===
- Mainichi Seiten! series 1 (Yuuta Asuoo)
- Mainichi Seiten! series 2: Kodomo wa Tomaranai (Yuuta Asuoo)
