= Band-Maid discography =

Band discography

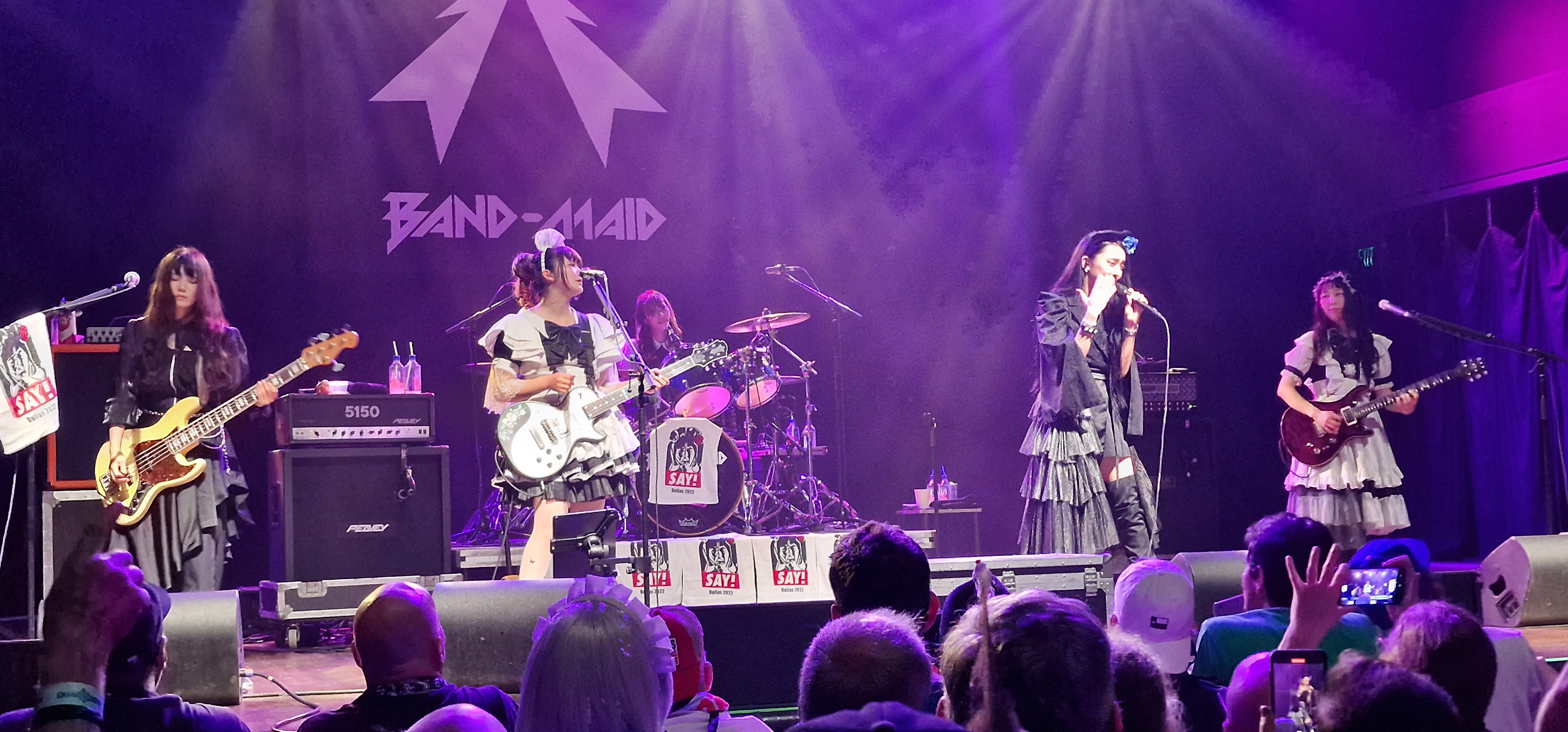
- Studio albums: 8
- EPs: 3
- Live albums: 2
- Compilation albums: 2
- Singles: 11
- Video albums: 4
- Music videos: 43

Band-Maid is a Japanese rock band formed in 2013, consisting of singer Saiki Atsumi, guitarist/singer Miku Kobato, lead guitarist Kanami Tōno, bassist Misa, and drummer Akane Hirose. The band combines a rock sound with a maid image modeled on Japanese maid cafés. They are currently signed to Pony Canyon; as of 2024 they have released eight studio albums, three EPs, and numerous singles.

== Albums ==
=== Studio albums ===
Title	Album details	Peak chart positions							
Title	Album details	JPN Oricon	JPN Billboard Top	UK Ind	UK Indie Break	UK Rock	US Hard Rock	US Heat	US World
Maid in Japan	Released: January 8, 2014; February 14, 2018 (re-issue); Label: Gump Records, Crown Stones (re-issue); Formats: CD, digital download	26 (re-issue)	22 (re-issue)	—	—	—	—	—	—
New Beginning	Released: November 18, 2015; Label: Gump Records; Formats: CD+DVD, digital download	64	49	—	—	—	—	—	—
Brand New Maid	Released: May 18, 2016; Label: Crown Stones, JPU Records; Formats: CD, CD+DVD, digital download	19	15	—	—	—	—	—	—
Just Bring It	Released: January 11, 2017; Label: Crown Stones, JPU Records; Formats: CD, digital download	16	20	49	13	17	—	—	—
World Domination	Released: February 14, 2018; Label: Crown Stones, JPU Records; Formats: CD, CD+DVD, CD+BD, digital download	9	7	—	—	—	—	—	—
Conqueror	Released: December 4, 2019; Label: Revolver Records, JPU Records; Formats: CD, CD+DVD, CD+BD, digital download	9	9	29	4	11	25	19	11
Unseen World	Released: January 13, 2021; Label: Pony Canyon; Formats: CD, CD+DVD, 2CD+BD, digital download	8	6	—	—	—	—	—	—
Epic Narratives	Released: September 25, 2024; Label: Pony Canyon; Formats: CD, CD+DVD, CD+BD, digital download	8	9	—	—	—	—	—	—
"—" denotes a recording that did not chart or was not released in that territory.

=== Live albums ===
Title	Album details
Band-Maid Online Acoustic Okyu-Ji (Dec. 25, 2021) (Note: Only sold to official fan club members)	Released: April 27, 2022; Label: Self-released; Formats: CD
Band-Maid Acoustic Okyu-Ji CD (March 20, 2024)	Released: December 25, 2024; Label: Self-released; Formats: CD

=== Compilations ===
Title	Album details	Peak chart positions	
Title	Album details	JPN Oricon	JPN Billboard
10th Anniversary Best Vol.1	Released: August 2, 2023; Label: Nippon Crown; Formats: CD, digital	16	12
10th Anniversary Best Vol.2	Released: August 2, 2023; Label: Nippon Crown; Formats: CD, digital	17	14

== EPs ==
Title	EP details	Peak chart positions	
Title	EP details	JPN Oricon	JPN Billboard Top
Band-Maiko (as Band-Maiko)	Released: April 3, 2019; Label: Revolver Records; Formats: CD, CD+DVD, digital download	15	11
Unleash	Released: September 21, 2022; Label: Pony Canyon; Formats: CD, CD+DVD, CD+BD	9	9
Scooooop	Released: October 22, 2025; Label: Pony Canyon; Formats: CD, CD+DVD, CD+BD	9	9

== Singles ==
Title	Year	Peak chart positions			Album
Title	Year	JPN Oricon	JPN Hot 100	JPN Top Singles	Album
"Ai to Jōnetsu no Matador" (愛と情熱のマタドール, "Love, Passion, Matador")	2014	—	—	—	Maid in Japan (2018 edition)
"YOLO"	2016	36	—	42	Just Bring It
"Daydreaming/Choose Me"	2017	20	—	18	World Domination
"Start Over"	2018	16	65	16	Non-album single
"Glory"	2019	12	70	11	Conqueror
"Bubble"	2019	14	—	13	Conqueror
"Different"	2020	19	—	17	Non-album singles
"About Us"	2021	—	—	—	Non-album singles
"Sense"	2021	14	—	13	Unleash
"Energetic"	2026	11	—	11	Non-album singles
"Spin"	2026	14	TBA	TBA	Non-album singles
"—" denotes a recording that did not chart.

=== Digital singles ===
Title	Year	Peak chart positions	Album
Title	Year	US World	Album
"Secret Maiko Lips" (as Band-Maiko)	2018	—	Band-Maiko
"Endless Story"	2019	—	Conqueror
"The Dragon Cries"	2019	—	Conqueror
"Reincarnation" (輪廻, "Rinne")	2019	—	Conqueror
"After Life"	2020	—	Unseen World
"Unleash!!!!!"	2022	—	Unleash
"Memorable"	2023	—	Epic Narratives
"Shambles"	2023	15	Epic Narratives
"Bestie"	2024	—	Epic Narratives
"Protect You"	2024	—	Epic Narratives
"Show Them" (with The Warning)	2024	—	Epic Narratives
"Zen"	2025	—	Scooooop
"Ready to Rock"	2025	—	Scooooop
"What Is Justice?"	2025	—	Scooooop

== Music videos ==
Song	Year	Director(s)	Link
"Thrill" (スリル)	2014	Daishi Hamada	
"Real Existence"	2015	Takayuki Kojima	
"Don't Let Me Down"	2015	Takayuki Kojima	
"Alone"	2016	Ryōji Aoki	
"The Non-Fiction Days"	2016	Ryōji Aoki	
"Before Yesterday"	2016	Unknown	
"Order"	2016	Ryōji Aoki	Brand New Maid DVD only
"YOLO"	2016	Ryōji Aoki	
"Don't You Tell Me"	2017	Ryōji Aoki	
"Secret My Lips"	2017	Ryōji Aoki	
"Daydreaming"	2017	Ryōji Aoki	
"Choose Me"	2017	Ryōji Aoki	
"Domination"	2018	Toshikazu Tamura	
"Dice"	2018	Ryōji Aoki	
"Secret Maiko Lips"	2018	Ryōji Aoki	
"Start Over"	2018	Ryōji Aoki	
"Glory"	2018	Ryōji Aoki	
"Bubble"	2019	Ryōji Aoki	
"Gion-cho" (祇園町)	2019	Ryōji Aoki	
"Endless Story"	2019	Ryōji Aoki	
"Rinne" (輪廻)	2019	Ryōji Aoki	
"Blooming"	2019	Ryōji Aoki	
"The Dragon Cries"	2020	Ryōji Aoki	
"Different"	2020	Ryōji Aoki	
"Manners"	2021	Ryōji Aoki	
"Warning!"	2021	Ryōji Aoki	
"After Life"	2021	Pennacky	
"Sense"	2021	Ryōji Aoki	
"Unleash!!!!!"	2022	Mitsuho Seta	
"From Now On"	2022	Ryōji Aoki	
"Influencer"	2022	Ryōji Aoki	
"Memorable"	2023	Ryōji Aoki	
"Shambles"	2023	Ryōji Aoki	
"Bestie"	2024	Ryōji Aoki	
"Protect You"	2024	Ryōji Aoki	
"Show Them" (with The Warning)	2024	Ryōji Aoki	
"Forbidden Tale"	2024	Ryōji Aoki	
"Zen"	2025	Ryōji Aoki	
"Ready To Rock"	2025	Ryōji Aoki	
"What Is Justice?"	2025	Ryōji Aoki	
"Present Perfect"	2025	Ryōji Aoki	
"Energetic"	2026	Ryōji Aoki	
"Spin"	2026	Ryōji Aoki	

== Video albums ==
List of video albums, with selected peak chart positions and sales
Title	Details	Peak positions	
Title	Details	JPN	
Title	Details	DVD	Blu-ray
Band-Maid World Domination Tour [Shinka] at Line Cube Shibuya (Shibuya Public Hall)	Released: April 29, 2020; Label: Revolver Records; Formats: DVD, BD	8	10
Band-Maid Online Okyu-Ji (Feb. 11, 2021)	Released: May 26, 2021; Label: Pony Canyon; Formats: DVD, BD	11	13
Band-Maid Tokyo Garden Theater Okyuji (Jan.09,2023)	Released: April 26, 2023; Label: Pony Canyon; Formats: DVD, BD, 2BD	15	11
Band-Maid 10th Anniversary Tour Final in Yokohama Arena (Nov.26,2023)	Released: March 27, 2024; Label: Pony Canyon; Formats: DVD, BD, 2BD	10	9

== Other appearances ==
Year	Title	Album
2017	"Honey" (ハニー) (Mucc cover)	Tribute of Mucc -En-
