= List of Platinum End episodes =

Platinum End
- Cover art for the first Blu-ray volume, featuring Mirai Kakehashi and Nasse.
- Native name
- Kanji: プラチナエンド
- Revised Hepburn: Purachina Endo
- No. of episodes: 24

Release
- Original network: TBS, BS11
- Original release: October 8, 2021 – March 25, 2022

Platinum End is a Japanese anime television series based on the manga series of the same name written by Tsugumi Ohba and illustrated by Takeshi Obata. On December 2, 2020, Pony Canyon registered the "Anime-PlatinumEnd.com" domain name, and on December 19, 2020, at the Jump Festa '21 online event, it was announced that the series would receive an anime television series adaptation by Signal.MD. Hideya Takahashi directed the "first series", while Kazuchika Kise is directing the "second series", with series composition by Shin'ichi Inozume, and character designs by Kōji Ōdate. Masahiro Tokuda is composing the series' music. The series is listed for 24 episodes, and aired on TBS, BS11, and other channels from October 8, 2021, to March 25, 2022. (Note: TBS lists the airing of the series on Thursday at 25:28, which is effectively Friday at 1:28 a.m. JST.) Band-Maid performed the opening theme "Sense", while Yuu Miyashita performed the first ending theme "Kōfuku-Ron" (Theory of Surrender). Kuhaku Gokko performed the second ending theme "Last Straw." Crunchyroll and Funimation licensed the series outside of Asia. Medialink licensed the series in South and Southeast Asia. Disney+ Hotstar started streaming the anime weekly in select Southeast Asian regions from January 5, 2022.

On October 28, 2021, Crunchyroll announced the series would receive an English dub, which premiered on November 18 of the same year.

== Episode list ==
No.	Title (Note: All English titles are taken from Crunchyroll.)	Directed by (Note: Information is taken from the ending credits of each episode.)	Written by	Storyboarded by	Original release date
1	"Gift from an Angel"; Transliteration: "Tenshi no Okurimono" (Japanese: 天使の贈り物)	Hideya Takahashi	Shin'ichi Inozume	Hideya Takahashi	October 8, 2021
On the day of his middle school graduation, Mirai Kakehashi loses the will to live and decides to commit suicide by jumping off a tower block. However, his life is suddenly spared by special-rank angel Nasse, who is already aware that Mirai's parents and younger brother Akira died in a car accident before Mirai was taken in by his abusive aunt and uncle. Nasse offers Mirai the hope of freedom with Wings and the hope of love with Arrows as Angel Tools, though Mirai initially rejects the offer until he uses his Wings. After Nasse shockingly reveals that Mirai's parents and Akira were murdered by Mirai's aunt and uncle, Mirai later shoots his Red Arrow at his aunt in order to verify the greedy truth. Mirai accidentally compels his aunt to stab herself to death right in front his uncle. Three days later, Mirai tells Nasse that he wants ordinary happiness, desiring enough money to improve his standard of living. Suggesting that Mirai could shoot his White Arrow at his uncle in order to ensure a painless death, Nasse explains that there are currently thirteen God candidates all competing to become the successor and each having their own angel.
2	"Hero of Justice"; Transliteration: "Seigi no Hīrō" (Japanese: 正義のヒーロー)	Yūki Nishihata	Shin'ichi Inozume	Atsushi Ōtsuki	October 15, 2021 (Note: This episode aired at 1:58 a.m. JST, 30 minutes after the original air time on TBS.)
Mirai wants to enroll in high school. After the news reports that failed comedian Tonma Rodriguez is polyamorous, Mirai realizes that Tonma is a God candidate who shot his Red Arrow at multiple women. In a parking garage, masked superhero Metropoliman, who is also a God candidate, shoots his White Arrow at Tonma inside a limo. Second-rank angel Luta is out of the running as he carries Tonma to the Celestial Realm, home to the angels. After shooting his Red Arrow in order to have his uncle surrender to the police, Mirai is shocked upon witnessing a public broadcast of a bank robbery, where Metropoliman shoots his Red Arrows to halt the riot police before shooting his Red and White Arrows to thwart and kill two bank robbers. Metropoliman blatantly proclaims that he plans to kill the other God candidates by any means necessary, having already killed one of them. Upon returning home, a doubtful Mirai starts to understand his role as a God candidate and the ranks of the angels. Despite all the warnings, Mirai still decides to attend his first day of class at high school while advising Nasse to stay home.
3	"Heart's Beloved"; Transliteration: "Akogare no Hito" (Japanese: 憧れの人)	Jang Hee kyu	Shinsuke Ōnishi	Kazuchika Kise	October 22, 2021
After seeing the second-rank angel Revel flying above the high school, Mirai is shot with a Red Arrow from behind by his childhood friend and classmate Saki Hanakago. As Mirai meets up with Saki in her bedroom, Revel confirms that Mirai is a God candidate and that Nasse is a special-rank angel. After teaching Mirai to link with Saki before using his Wings, Revel explains that Metropoliman poses as a tabloid superhero and plans to kill the other God candidates. As Mirai is willing to sacrifice himself in order to protect Saki, Nasse luckily finds him and explains that Angel Tools can be taken or transferred if a God candidate dies. Meanwhile, Metropoliman speaks with his special-rank angel Meyza, who believes that the other God candidates are afraid of being killed. After thirty-three days, the effects of Saki's Red Arrow wears off on Mirai, who remains in love with Saki. Metropoliman publicly announces that he wants to establish a peaceful alliance by inviting the other God candidates at a ballpark called the Jinbo Stadium. Mirai and Saki arrive at the Jinbo Stadium on high alert as Metropoliman makes a dramatic entrance on the pitcher's mound.
4	"Time to Assemble"; Transliteration: "Shūketsu no Toki" (Japanese: 集結の瞬間(とき))	Sō Toyama	Katsuya Ishida	Tatsuo Satō	October 29, 2021
Metroblue and Metroyellow, two God candidates, suddenly arrive at the Jinbo Stadium and challenge Metropoliman to a duel. In the past, Shogo Hatakeyama and Saburo Tabuchi failed their college entrance exam and attempted to commit suicide via drug overdose. After being saved by first-rank angels Emaka and Egura, Shogo and Saburo assumed the identities of Metroblue and Metroyellow. In the present, the real Metropoliman briefly appears on the jumbotron, explaining that the fake Metropoliman is an ordinary human shot with a Red Arrow. A young girl named Chiyo Nakayama, another God candidate, appears with second-rank angel Jami and asks to join Shogo and Saburo. However, the real Metropoliman swiftly shoots his Red Arrow at Chiyo before leaving again. Meanwhile, Mirai and Saki sit idly by while struggling to act upon the situation. Switching places with the fake Metropoliman after bribing two cosplayers named Metropink and Metrogreen as pawns for distraction, the real Metropoliman then shoots his White Arrow at Shogo and his Red Arrow at Saburo. After handcuffing Saburo and Chiyo together to the stands, Metropoliman shoots his White Arrow at Saburo, making Chiyo rather defenseless.
5	"Death Sentence"; Transliteration: "Shi no Senkoku" (Japanese: 死の宣告)	Oh Eun soo	Atsuhiro Tomioka	Jun'ichi Sakata	November 5, 2021
Just when Metropoliman shoots his White Arrow at Chiyo, Nasse arrives at the scene and urges the remaining God candidates to leave the Jinbo Stadium with the ordinary humans. Mirai and Saki head back to Saki's bedroom during a downpour. Revel knows that Metropoliman is capable of outsmarting the police, while Nasse deduces that Mirai will not gain happiness from killing Metropoliman. Nanato Mukaido, another God candidate, suddenly appears from outside the window. He suffers from terminal cancer, having previously met first-rank angel Baret in a hospital. Furthermore, he provided for his pregnant wife Aya and daughter Nanaka after shooting his Red Arrows at rich people, and he sought to find the other God candidates at the Jinbo Stadium after shooting his Red Arrows at detectives. Mirai and Saki agree to form an alliance with Nanato, revealed as a product planner for an apparel company. The next day, Kanade Uryu, implied to be Metropoliman, and his classmate Mizukiyo Minamikawa discuss their wishes after class while watching Mizukiyo's crush Sayuri during archery practice. Kanade returns to his home, where he brings flowers to his deceased younger sister Rea Uryu, who is being kept in a freeze chamber.
6	"Two Painful Options"; Transliteration: "Kujū no Nitaku" (Japanese: 苦渋の二択)	Yūki Nishihata	Shin'ichi Inozume	Hiroshi Aoyama	November 12, 2021
The news reports that middle schoolgirl and amateur teen model Mimimi "Misurin" Yamada has escaped juvenile detention after being convicted as a serial killer two years ago. Mirai, Saki and Nanato deduce that Metropoliman shot his Red Arrow at Misurin before lending her a Red Arrow and Wings so she could escape and target other female victims. Metropoliman has acquired three Red Arrows and three Wings from the previously eliminated God candidates. Nanato states that the best option for Mirai is to kill Metropoliman with a White Arrow, though Mirai may not have the courage to do this. The news later reports that the body of middle schoolgirl Hikari Yaishi was discovered on the rooftop of the Grand Tower, where her common carotid artery and both wrists were slashed by a sharp blade. Realizing that Misurin is located hovering above the Grand Tower, Nanato equips Mirai with a red motorsport costume, while Saki holds down the fort in her bedroom. If Metropoliman does not show up at the Grand Tower, then Nanato will have no choice but to kill Misurin. Nanato confronts Misurin on the rooftop of the Grand Tower, while Mirai is on standby at a nearby rooftop.
7	"Tower of Nightmare"; Transliteration: "Akumu no Tawā" (Japanese: 悪夢のタワー)	Yūsuke Kubo	Katsuya Ishida	Yūsuke Kubo	November 19, 2021
Just as Nanato realizes that he fell right into a trap, Metropoliman remotely detonates the rooftop of the Grand Tower, killing Misurin. Mirai luckily saves Nanato from plummeting to the ground. Metropoliman appears from the rising smoke behind Mirai, who finally confronts Metropoliman for his sinister methods of eliminating the competition by sacrificing ordinary humans. Despite Metropoliman unveiling that he has planted a second bomb in another location, Nanato calls this bluff and proceeds to stop Metropoliman. As Metropoliman prepares to shoot a White Arrow at Nanato, Mirai deflects it with a Red Arrow. Metropoliman is then recklessly attacked by Mirai with his Red Arrow, though Mirai is forced to dodge Metropoliman with his White Arrow at high speeds. Nanato tries to restrain Metropoliman with firearms, though Mirai holds back from shooting his Red Arrow after seeing a glimpse of Metropoliman's face. Metropoliman then quickly evades the area. Returning to Saki's bedroom, Mirai admits to Saki and Nanato of being a coward since he is not cut out for battle, though he desires to have a normal life instead of being a God candidate.
8	"Symbol of Promise"; Transliteration: "Yakusoku no Shirushi" (Japanese: 約束のしるし)	Jang Hee kyu	Shinsuke Ōnishi	Hiroaki Yoshikawa	November 26, 2021 (Note: This episode aired at 1:30 a.m. JST, 2 minutes after the original air time on TBS.)
Nanato learns that Saki attempted to commit suicide by drowning at sea prior to meeting Revel. Meanwhile, Mizukiyo speculates that Kanade is really Metropoliman. Later at night, Saki invites Mirai to sleep with her in bed. Saki admits that she wants to die after viewing Mirai as her bodyguard rather than her ally. Recalling when Mirai gave her a spotted yellow ladybug on a four-leaf clover to symbolize their everlasting friendship since childhood, Saki felt ashamed that she used to bully Mirai after his parents died. She also witnessed him jumping off the tower block on the day of the middle school graduation, which compelled her to drown herself at sea. After Saki requests Mirai to kill her, he takes her to the sky, convincing her to regain her will to live. The next day, Saki has a new attitude as she tells Mirai and Nanato that their meeting place will be relocated inside an abandoned church instead of her bedroom. Baret then informs Saki about the four methods on how to acquire Wings involving a previously eliminated God candidate, though a safer option is if Revel could be promoted as a first-rank angel.
9	"The Face of an Assassin"; Transliteration: "Shikaku no Kao" (Japanese: 刺客の貌)	Kenta Ōnishi	Atsuhiro Tomioka	Royden B	December 3, 2021
A sword wielder named Hajime Sokotani, another God candidate, kills a detective who was previously shot with a Red Arrow. At the church, Nanato equips Saki with a yellow motorsport costume. After reclaiming his Red Arrow, Nanato deduces that the detective is dead. Approaching Nanato's house, Mirai briefly encounters Hajime, while Nanato eventually finds out that Aya and Nanaka have been abducted. In the past, Hajime was poor and ugly during childhood. When his mother committed suicide by hanging, Hajime nearly followed suit until meeting first-rank angel Balta. Hajime became obsessed with Metropoliman, who is his polar opposite. Despite obtaining wealth before getting cosmetic facial surgery and a new hairdo, he still had poor communication skills. When the news reported the incident at the Grand Tower, Hajime eventually learned of Kanade's identity as Metropoliman, wishing to become his loyal subordinate. At a dance studio, Hajime remotely communicated with Kanade, who implored Hajime to capture another God candidate. In the present, Nanato is contacted by Kanade, who says that Aya and Nanaka are being held hostage at the abandoned Minamino Amusement Park. Mirai and Nanato head towards Minamino Amusement Park, while Saki stays behind at the church.
10	"Where the Tears Go"; Transliteration: "Namida no Yukue" (Japanese: 涙の行方)	Rei Nakahara	Shinsuke Ōnishi	Jun'ichi Sakata	December 10, 2021
Intent on rescuing Aya and Nanaka, Nanato walks inside a house of mirrors, though this is a trap set by Hajime. After being surrounded by Metropoliman and Hajime, Mirai willingly enters the house of mirrors, instructing Nanato that they must use their Wings to fly inside the house of mirrors while carrying Aya and Nanaka in order to avoid being seen from the outside. As Metropoliman leaves Hajime to finish the job, Mirai and Nanato try to trick Hajime into thinking that they managed to escape without being seen. At the church, Saki sees herself as useless since she cannot fight without Wings. Upon reflecting on his own powerlessness, Revel sheds tears for the first time. Due to this, Revel is promoted as a first-rank angel, and Saki is granted her own Wings. As Saki arrives at Minamino Amusement Park, she shoots her Red Arrow at Hajime, while Mirai and Nanato are unaware of what is happening outside. Hajime experiences love for the first time as he struggles with his loyalty towards Metropoliman.
11	"Your Own Worth"; Transliteration: "Onore no Kachi" (Japanese: 己の価値)	Shinji Nagata	Katsuya Ishida	Shinji Nagata; Atsushi Ōtsuki	December 17, 2021 (Note: This episode aired at 1:38 a.m. JST, 10 minutes after the original air time on TBS.)
Saki compels Hajime to rescue her friends from the house of mirrors. Defying Metropoliman's orders, Hajime finally values human life and punctures the glass dome. Metropoliman suddenly arrives with his underlings, former military servant Ryuji Bakamatsu, pharmaceutical researcher Fuyuko Kohinata and masked boy Susumu Yuito. Hajime protects Saki, while Mirai and Nanato break through the glass dome with Aya and Nanaka in tow. Aya and Nanaka are each taken back to the church by Saki, who soon learns that Hajime would kill anyone for her. Mirai, Saki and Nanato shoot Red Arrows at each other as a bidding strategy. After Hajime dodges Ryuji's gunfire, Mirai and Saki restrain Ryuji, allowing Hajime to cut off Ryuji's right arm. As Fuyuko threatens to release an airborne virus capable of killing millions of people, Metropoliman forces Mirai to be the first test subject for an untested drug capable of melting someone.
12	"A Fine Line Between Offense and Defense"; Transliteration: "Kamihitoe no Kōbō" (Japanese: 紙一重の攻防)	Shin'ya Sadamitsu	Atsuhiro Tomioka	Hiroaki Yoshikawa	December 24, 2021 (Note: This episode aired at 2:08 a.m. JST, 40 minutes after the original air time on TBS.)
Mirai approach Fuyuko on the Ferris wheel, while Saki, Nanato and Hajime are helpless to stop Mirai. As Fuyuko prepares to inject Mirai with the untested drug, Mirai grabs Fuyuko by the hand before shooting a White Arrow at the airborne virus moments after it is released. Now having the best opportunity to kill Fuyuko with his White Arrow, Mirai internally struggles with achieving happiness by attempting murder. A depleted Nanato tries to aim a rifle at Metropoliman as a distraction. Metropoliman shoots his White Arrow while Fuyuko releases three syringes containing the untested drug, both aimed at Mirai. Saki shields Mirai, which redirects the White Arrow back to Metropoliman's possession. After severing two syringes, Hajime is consequently pierced by the third syringe, though he still manages to kill Fuyuko with his sword before melting to death. As Mirai and Saki mourn the death of Hajime, Metropoliman scoffs at the fact that Hajime lived an insignificant life similar to a cockroach. Susumu chickens out of the battle after having witnessed everything, while Nanato is down for the count. Believing that Metropoliman is lower than a cockroach, Mirai preserves his happiness by planning to only shoot Red Arrows at Metropoliman.
13	"World Peace"; Transliteration: "Sekai no Heiwa" (Japanese: 世界の平和)	Yūki Nishihata	Shin'ichi Inozume	Atsushi Ōtsuki	January 7, 2022
Agreeing to mutual combat on the ground, Mirai is armed with Red Arrows and Metropoliman is armed with White Arrows as they gradually move closer to each other while taking turns shooting and dodging. As their duel unfolds, Metropoliman reflects on his own personal values. In the past, Kanade displayed his affection for Rea by decorating her bedroom with flowers and aiding her in the tennis court due to their socioeconomic status. Rea was invited to go on a date with a boy, but a possessive Kanade begged Rea to stay. Rea stumbled and fell off the balcony, suffering a cerebral contusion from hitting her head on a stone before being cushioned by the flowers. After keeping Rea's corpse in a freeze chamber, Kanade met Meyza for the first time. In the present, Susumu secretly exposes the duel to the public via live streaming, though the location remains censored. Metropoliman proclaims that he will eliminate poverty and inequality if he becomes the successor, though this means that the poor and ugly will be killed. As Mirai and Metropoliman inch even closer, Metropoliman prepares to make an underhanded move.
14	"Two Lights"; Transliteration: "Futatsu no Hikari" (Japanese: 二つの光)	Yūsuke Kubo	Atsuhiro Tomioka	Yūsuke Kubo	January 14, 2022
Initially believing that he is not fighting the real Metropoliman, Mirai has a sense of clarity when Metropoliman briefly shows his face as Kanade. Mirai suddenly charges with his Red Arrow at Metropoliman, but it is revealed that Metropoliman was previously shot with a Red Arrow by someone else. In order to prevent Metropoliman from shooting his White Arrow, Mirai uses his Wings to block Metropoliman's field of vision and grabs onto Metropoliman's right hand. Instead, Metropoliman uses his left hand to stab Mirai, but Mirai's red motorsport costume proves to be impenetrable. Saki then grabs onto Metropoliman's left hand, allowing Mirai and Saki to link together while binding Metropoliman. Making peace with himself as being a hero, Nanato uses his remaining strength to walk with his rifle towards Metropoliman, who confesses that he has been fighting in honor of Rea. As Nanato pulls the trigger, Metropoliman is finally shot to death, having nowhere to run or hide. Mirai and Saki take Nanato to the hospital, where Nanato eventually succumbs to his terminal cancer. Before carrying Nanato to the Celestial Realm, Baret gives Nanato's Red Arrow and Wings to Saki.
15	"Diffused Power"; Transliteration: "Kakusan no Chikara" (Japanese: 拡散の力)	Shigeru Ueda	Shinsuke Ōnishi	Yoshiaki Kawajiri	January 21, 2022
Engaged detectives Masaya Hoshi and Manami Yumiki conduct an investigation on the identities of the remaining God candidates after the death of Kanade. Mirai and Saki are unaware that Kanade was previously shot with a Red Arrow by Susumu, who compelled Kanade to target Mirai in the first place. After reviewing that Saki has three Red Arrows and three Wings, Mirai also racks his brain over which of the other four remaining God candidates took Kanade's acquired four Wings, four Red Arrows and one White Arrow. Mirai and Saki eat curry for breakfast. The six remaining angels have a meeting since half of the God candidates have been eliminated. While eating egg sandwiches for lunch, Mirai and Saki learn that Susumu publicly exposed himself as a God candidate and admitted to broadcasting Metropoliman's defeat. After explaining the role of the God candidates, Susumu says that he lived a lonely life and attempted to overdose on sleeping pills prior to meeting first-rank angel Penema. Having felt exhilarated after witnessing the duel between Mirai and Metropoliman at Minamino Amusement Park, Susumu encourages the public to track down the remaining God candidates and vote for whoever should become the successor.
16	"World's Greatest Assassin"; Transliteration: "Saikō no Ansatsusha" (Japanese: 最高の暗殺者)	Tsuyoshi Nagasawa	Katsuya Ishida	Tatsuo Satō	January 28, 2022
Susumu publicly nominates Mirai to become the successor. On a tropical island, a God candidate named Yuri Temari learns from her second-rank angel Yazeli that the potential successor might make the God candidates cease to exist. Still affected by Mirai's previously shot Red Arrow, Saki wishes to run away with Mirai, though he reassures her that their real identities will not be discovered since they were only seen in their motorsport costumes. Later on, Masaya locates Mirai, though Saki accidentally shoots her Red Arrow at Manami. Masaya wishes to protect instead of capture Mirai and Saki, while Manami had figured out their real identites. Mirai and Saki are brought to Masaya and Manami's apartment and are given secure smartphones, eventually convincing Mirai and Saki to collaborate with Masaya and Manami. After Masaya and Manami begin to understand the role of the God candidates, it is revealed that Yuri has been already captured. Saki also equips Manami with Wings and a Red Arrow. They look further into Mizukiyo, who recently started dating Sayuri shortly after Kanade's death.
17	"The Other Five"; Transliteration: "Hoka no Gonin" (Japanese: 他の5人)	Shin'ya Sadamitsu	Shin'ichi Inozume	Jun'ichi Sakata	February 4, 2022
Mirai and Saki confront Mizukiyo in a park, in which Mirai shoots his Red Arrow at Mizukiyo, compelling Mizukiyo to be an ally. After Mirai prevents Shuji Nakaumi, another God candidate, from compelling his older brother Osamu to commit suicide in their bedroom, Mizukiyo admits that he lied about being a God candidate after first-rank angel Ogaro appears behind Shuji. Having a strong belief in euthanasia, Shuji gradually compelled his hospitalized grandfather, divorced father and cheating mother to die peacefully after shooting his Red Arrow at each of them. After Mizukiyo puts in his two cents by explaining his prior friendship with Kanade, a somewhat convinced Shuji refrains from compelling Osamu to commit suicide. Mirai, Saki and Mizukiyo bring Shuji and Osamu to Masaya and Manami's apartment. There is still one God candidate yet to be identified. Shuji says that people are the result of worldly passions fueled by desire, though Masaya says that desires make people happy. After making a public appearance in their motorsport costumes, Mirai and Saki meet with Susumu in the atmosphere, persuading him to help them identify the last God candidate. Meanwhile, Revel relays this information to Yuri, who is being held in protective custody.
18	"Last Supper"; Transliteration: "Saigo no Bansan" (Japanese: 最後の晩餐)	Seung-hui Son	Atsuhiro Tomioka	Atsushi Ōtsuki	February 11, 2022
With some discreet help from Masaya and Manami, Yuri manages to escape from being held in protective custody. In the woods, Susumi transfers Wings to Yuri, who goes with Mirai and Saki to Masaya and Manami's apartment. Ogaro explains the powerful role of the successor, who will reside in the Celestial Realm with the angels and watch over the humans on Earth. Disagreeing with Shuji's idealism of encouraging suicide, Mirai believes in providing hope instead. Susumu remotely suggests to vote for whoever should become the successor, and the majority decide to vote for Shuji. Elsewhere, professor emeritus Gaku Yoneda, another God candidate, talks to special-rank angel Muni about eating his final dinner while surmising that his despair for humanity is paradoxically his aspiration for humanity. Mizukiyo and Osamu stay with Masaya and Manami. Mirai, Saki, Susumu, Yuri and Shuji make a public appearance in Yūrakuchō, where they are met by Muni. However, Gaku will not show himself until the others share their thoughts with Muni on whoever should become the successor. When military helicopters approach Mirai, Saki, Susumu, Yuri and Shuji, Gaku contacts prime minister Suzuki, urging him to refrain from attacking the other God candidates.
19	"The Future of Humanity"; Transliteration: "Ningen no Mirai" (Japanese: 人間の未来)	Akira Mano	Shinsuke Ōnishi	Jun'ichi Sakata	February 18, 2022
Susumu, Yuri, Shuji, Saki and Mirai respectively disperse to various television stations in Roppongi, Shiodome, Odaiba, Jinnan and Akasaka. Suzuki then orders the military helicopters to withdraw. Each of them broadcast their worldview in becoming the successor. This includes euthanasia for Shuji, hedonism for Yuri, leisure for Susumu, happiness for Saki and niksen for Mirai. As Mirai, Saki, Susumu, Yuri and Shuji regroup back at Yūrakuchō, Gaku finally shows himself as the last God candidate. Theorizing that humanity invented the concept of a divine entity, Gaku reveals that he has previously written about denying the existence of spirits and souls, which cannot be proven through scientific observation. Proclaiming that the age of prayers has now come to an end, Gaku publicly debunks the concept of a divine entity, referring to it as a fading creature. Meanwhile, military snipers have targeted the six remaining God candidates from the shadows. After Gaku believes that humanity would be better off without a successor, Shuji opts to side with Gaku. Despite this, a determined Mirai still decides that he wants to become the successor.
20	"The Price of Honor"; Transliteration: "Meiyo no Daishō" (Japanese: 名誉の代償)	Fumihiro Matsui; Kazuya Mihashi	Katsuya Ishida	Kazuchika Kise	February 25, 2022
One of the military snipers successfully hits Susumu, causing the others to flee from the scene. Gaku shoots his White Arrow at Susumu, taking Susumu's acquired Arrows and Wings while Shuji watches in awe. Mirai, Saki and Yuri retreat back to Masaya and Manami's apartment. For his safety, Gaku shoots his Red Arrow at Shuji. After Masaya learns that Gaku is the last God candidate, Manami shoots her Red Arrow at Masaya. Mirai, Saki and Yuri are brought by Masaya and Manami to an emergency shelter. Masaya reveals that Gaku has won Nobel Prizes in Physics and in Literature after choosing to become a high school dropout in order to study on his own and avoid interpersonal relationships. Meanwhile, Shuji learns that Gaku agreed to become a God candidate so that he would possibly experience the afterlife. Gaku recalls that he first met Muni after he attempted to commit suicide via drug overdose due to the overwhelming publicity of his scientific research. Placed in a tough situation, Gaku agrees to lend a White Arrow to Shuji after Ogaro divulges that Nasse has the ability to directly interact with Mirai. The public greatly prefers Gaku over Yuri as the successor.
21	"The Time for Talk"; Transliteration: "Taiwa no Jikan" (Japanese: 対話の時間)	Akira Mano	Shin'ichi Inozume	Atsushi Ōtsuki	March 4, 2022
The effects of Saki's Red Arrows wear off on Masaya and Manami. As per Gaku's request, Suzuki publicly announces that the New National Stadium will be a secure venue for the God candidates to hold a meeting in five days. Mirai, Saki and Yuri discuss that now only ten percent of the world population still believe in a divine entity. At night, Mizukiyo and Sayuri witness Mirai and Saki using their Wings in the sky, though perceived as shooting stars. Gaku and Shuji enjoy a Chateaubriand during their feast with Suzuki. At sunrise, Mirai and Saki go on the rooftop of the tower block, where Saki confesses her love to Mirai. On the day of the meeting, Mirai, Saki, Yuri, Masaya and Manami arrive at the New National Stadium, where Gaku and Shuji are waiting. Masaya tries to reason with Gaku, who reveals that he overcame his anthropophobia despite his arrogance. Thanks to an experiment previously conducted on suicidal people deep in the woods, Gaku has figured out a way so that the five remaining God candidates would die almost simultaneously without a successor being chosen.
22	"Wings of Determination"; Transliteration: "Kakugo no Tsubasa" (Japanese: 覚悟の翼)	Shigeru Ueda	Atsuhiro Tomioka	Yoshiaki Kawajiri	March 11, 2022
Believing that humans should decide how humanity ends, Gaku explains that all of humanity would lose the will to live due to the concept of time. With Masaya acting as a witness, Mirai and Gaku have a private conversation, while Saki, Yuri, Manami and Shuji temporarily leave the New National Stadium. Mirai firmly desires to preserve happiness by saving human lives. This spurs mixed reactions from the public. Mirai gains the resolve to aim his White Arrow at Gaku, while Saki, Yuri and Manami find themselves held captive by Shuji, who aims his White Arrow at Saki. As Mirai realizes that humanity would face extinction due to scientific progress, Gaku explains that the future is already predetermined in the past, though Mirai believes that the future is the product of the present. After twenty-eight seconds have passed, Mirai decides that he will not become the successor. Gaku calls out Mirai for being willing to forsake millions of lives in order to save Saki, though Mirai notes that Saki is the most important person to him. After another twenty-eight seconds have passed, Mirai chooses to sacrifice himself for Saki as Gaku shoots a White Arrow at Mirai.
23	"At the End of Thought"; Transliteration: "Shikō no Hate" (Japanese: 思考の果て)	Kei Suezawa	Shinsuke Ōnishi	Yoshiaki Kawajiri	March 18, 2022
Nasse suddenly swoops in and saves Mirai from dying, though she is consequently demoted as a second-rank angel, while Masaya catches Mirai from plummeting to the ground. Meanwhile, Saki, Yuri and Manami deduce that Shuji may not have the resolve to kill someone who wants to live. When Masaya finally places Mirai on the ground, Gaku shoots his White Arrow at Mirai, who is then saved by the timely arrival of Saki. Manami returns with Shuji at the New National Stadium, but Yuri fails to initiate a sneak attack when Nasse swoops in to save Gaku. Nasse is surprisingly promoted as a special-rank angel. It is revealed that Shuji previously released Saki, Yuri and Manami before lending his White Arrow to Yuri. Although Gaku thinks that he is not a genius, the public says otherwise. As it is concluded that happiness can only be achieved through others, Gaku prepares to commit suicide. However, it is unanimously decided that Shuji will become the successor, thus ending the selection process. Upon consent, the memories of Masaya, Manami and Yuri are erased, while the memories of Mirai, Saki and Gaku are retained.
24	"The Final Arrow"; Transliteration: "Saigo no Ya" (Japanese: 最期の矢)	Tsuyoshi Nagasawa	Shin'ichi Inozume	Kazuchika Kise	March 25, 2022
Ascending into the Celestial Realm, where time moves slower than on Earth, Shuji realizes that God is beginning to fuse with him. Yuri is shown to be the assistant of Gaku, who is analyzing the effects of the Red Arrow that Shuji left behind, but to no avail. Deciding to run a flower shop that sells four-leaf clovers, Mirai and Saki notably become an engaged couple before getting married at the church. Nasse tells Shuji that the other angels are worried about him. Six years have passed on Earth, and the handful of people that Shuji knew are living happy lives. However, Shuji has an epiphany after seeing so many people greatly divided in socioeconomic status. He then shoots himself with a White Arrow. His suicide also kills the old God, which causes the Celestial Realm and everything in it to gradually vanish, never to return. All living beings on Earth also gradually vanish, as Mirai and Saki accept their fate and die happily together. With Earth left as a barren wasteland, an endless number of unknown life forms from outer space primarily wonder if they should seed another God, though they ultimately declare that everyone desires death.

== Home media release ==
=== Japanese ===
Pony Canyon (Region 2 — Japan)
Vol.	Episodes	Cover art	Release date	Ref.
1	1–6	Mirai Kakehashi & Nasse	January 19, 2022	
2	7–12	Nanato Mukaido, Saki Hanakago, Kanade Uryu & Hajime Sokotani	March 16, 2022	
3	13–18	Gaku Yoneda, Yuri Temari, Shuji Nakaumi & Susumu Yuito	May 18, 2022	
4	19–24	Mirai Kakehashi, Kanade Uryu, Nanato Mukaido, Saki Hanakago & Hajime Sokotani	July 20, 2022	
