= Don't Be Long =

Don't Be Long may also refer to:

- Don't Be Long, the 2015 studio album by Make Do and Mend
- "Don't Be Long", a B-side song of the 2020 single Different by Band-Maid
