= Unleash (EP) =

EP by Band-Maid
- Released: September 21, 2022
- Length: 28:33
- Language: Japanese
- Label: Pony Canyon
- Producer: Band-Maid

Band-Maid chronology
Unseen World (2021)	Unleash (2022)	Epic Narratives (2024)

Singles from Unleash
- 1. "Sense" Released: October 27, 2021

Unleash is the second extended play by Japanese rock band Band-Maid. The EP was released by Pony Canyon on September 21, 2022, and contains eight tracks, including the lead single "Sense". It debuted at number nine on the Oricon Albums Chart, selling 7,590 in its first week.

== Background and recording ==
The songs on Unleash were taken from compositions that the band had worked on over the previous two years.

== Composition and lyrics ==
Lead guitarist Kanami Tōno stated that she tries not to listen to rock bands, so that she won't be inspired by them. "From Now On" originated because lead vocalist Saiki Atsumi wanted to have a new instrumental. The song includes orchestral elements. Bassist Misa wrote her bass solo on a keyboard. Tōno wrote "Balance" with an image of bouncy song, but that would also feel futuristic and experimental. It includes lots of English words because rhythm guitarist/vocalist Miku Kobato wanted to use more strong words. Atsumi asked Kobato to make the beginning of the chorus in Japanese.

Atsumi asked Tōno to write "Unleash!!!!!" with the theme of the second phase of world domination. Tōno wanted the melody at the start of the song to be the hook as she feels that Atsumi has a very hook-laden voice. The vocal key was originally higher but Atsumi found it difficult to sing. It was the last song written for the EP. The tempo is 193.

"Sense" and "Corallium" originally appeared on the single for "Sense". They were approached to write "Sense" on New Year's Day 2021 and recorded it before summer. The lyrics are about the manga Platinum End. They were given free range with the lyrics, except that they had to include the words "angel" and "premonition". The orchestral intro was not originally part of the song, Tōno composed it after the producers of the anime asked them to include it.

Atsumi also wrote lyrics for "I'll", but Kobato's lyrics were chosen instead. "Corallium" is Atsumi's first lyrical composition. Kobato also wrote lyrics for the song, but Atsumi's lyrics were chosen instead. The song is about the ocean, which she is afraid of. She stated that she thinks the ocean is similar to love. Atsumi asked Tōno to write a song similar to "Alone" or "Choose Me".

"Influencer" is about women who live their lives through social media and want to be beautiful all the time. When Tōno was writing the song, she knew that she wanted to include a long bass solo. Drummer Akane Hirose consciously wanted to include simple and intense sounding drums without too much complexity.

"Hate?" is the oldest song on Unleash, it was written two years earlier as an instrumental. When Atsumi heard Tōno's demo for the song, Atsumi thought that Tōno was angry about something, which she denied, saying she had an image of an explosion. The lyrics were written at a time when Atsumi was seeing a lot of stories about infidelities in the news. Kobato also wrote lyrics for the song, but Atsumi's lyrics were chosen instead.

== Critical reception ==
=== Accolades ===
Publication	Accolade	Rank
Punknews.org	Samantha Barrett's Top EPs of 2022	1
Rice Digital	Six of the top 2022 JRock albums	—
Wall of Sound	Simon Valentine's Top 10 Releases of 2022	2

== Track listing ==
All music written by Band-Maid.

Track listing for Unleash
No.	Title	Lyrics	Length
1.	"From Now On"	(instrumental)	3:46
2.	"Balance"	Miku Kobato	3:09
3.	"Unleash!!!!!"	Kobato; Saiki Atsumi	3:10
4.	"Sense"	Kobato	3:24
5.	"I'll"	Kobato	4:07
6.	"Corallium"	Atsumi	3:54
7.	"Influencer"	Kobato	3:23
8.	"Hate?"	Atsumi	3:37
Total length:			28:33

=== DVD/Blu-ray (Limited Edition) ===
No.	Title	Length
1.	"Unleash!!!!!" (Music video)
2.	"From Now On" (Music video)
3.	"Unleash!!!!!" (Instrumental video)
4.	"Sense" (Instrumental video)

== Personnel ==
Band-Maid

- Saiki Atsumi – lead vocals
- Miku Kobato – rhythm guitar, vocals
- Kanami Tōno – lead guitar
- Misa – bass
- Akane Hirose – drums

== Charts ==
Weekly chart performance for Unleash
Chart (2022)	Peak position
Japanese Albums (Oricon)	9
Japanese Hot Albums (Billboard Japan)	10
