= Epic Narratives =

Studio album by Band-Maid
- Released: September 25, 2024
- Languages: Japanese; English
- Label: Pony Canyon
- Producer: Band-Maid

Band-Maid chronology
Unleash (2022)	Epic Narratives (2024)	Scooooop (2025)

Epic Narratives is the eighth studio album by Japanese rock band Band-Maid. It was released on September 25, 2024, and was their first full-length studio album since the release of Unseen World in January 2021, three years and eight months prior. It reached the top 10 on iTunes worldwide albums chart.

== Background and recording ==
The production period for the album lasted three and a half years.

== Composition and lyrics ==
"Shambles" was used as the ending theme for the second season of Kengan Ashura. "Protect You" was used as the ending theme of Grendizer U. The band said that they were given a request not to make it as intense as one of their previous songs. Rhythm guitarist/vocalist Miku Kobato said she was told to make the song about the heroine instead of the main character. The lyrics focus on the twin sisters Rubina and Terrona. Lead guitarist Kanami Tōno said she didn't want to make the song a ballad. Tōno said she wanted the guitar solo to have a melody that can hummed too, while also being technical.

"Show Them" is a collaboration with the Mexican band The Warning. Band-Maid met The Warning at Aftershock Festival 2022 and the two bands discussed a collaboration. Tōno wrote the demo of the song and then showed it to the members of The Warning, who suggested some changes. Band-Maid wanted to write a song that featured the characteristics of both bands. Both lead vocalist Saiki Atsumi and Daniela Villarreal of The Warning sing in a higher register than usual due to Tōno's insistence. Kobato and The Warning wrote the lyrics with the idea of portraying a strong female image. They considered having a verse in Japanese or Spanish, but decided to keep the song completely in English. Band-Maid recorded their parts first, with The Warning recording theirs later.

Tōno wrote "Forbidden Tale" after the death of someone close to her. Atsumi had told Tōno that she wanted a song with a lot of progression. Drummer Akane Hirose said she didn't want to make it sound too cluttered by putting too many notes in it. Bassist Misa tried to keep the song sounding simple.

Kobato tried to make "Brightest Star" sound like a call-and-response exercise with the audience. When Tōno showed Kobato the demo of the song, she imagined a very poppy song, but wanted to include darker lyrics, and tried to express the feelings of both sides of humanity through her singing. Kobato included the English phrase "I'm game" after reading it in a book. Tōno wrote the guitar solo for both her and Kobato to play together, and tried to emulate the sound of a harmonica.

Tōno wrote "Letters to You" to appeal to people who like Band-Maid's poppier songs. Atusmi wrote the lyrics with the idea that you will never forget the people you have lost and will always think of them. "The One" was originally written by Tōno with idea of being performed at Yokohama Arena. Kobato rewrote the lyrics three times, with the image of thinking of someone important in mind. "Memorable" is a ballad written during their 2022 North American tour. "Go Easy" was written around the time the previous EP, Unleash, was being written. Tōno wanted to write a song that would get live audiences excited right from the introduction.

For "Toi et moi", Tōno wanted to write a riff that would pull the listener in, and that would also sound like a typical Band-Maid riff. Tōno intentionally kept the song short in length. Kobato said she couldn't find a title in English that worked, so she chose one in French because she felt that French people express themselves clearly through their movies.

For "Tamaya!" Atsumi wrote the lyrics with the idea of having twin vocals, and wanted to feature Kobato's vocals in the forefront of the mix. "Get to the Top" was the last song written for the album. When the album was almost completed, Atsumi approached Tōno with the idea of including an instrumental song.

== Track listing ==
All music written by Band-Maid, except where noted.

Track listing for Epic Narratives
No.	Title	Lyrics	Music	Length
1.	"Magie" (Magic)	Saiki Atsumi		3:06
2.	"Shambles"	Miku Kobato		3:25
3.	"Protect You"	Kobato		3:17
4.	"Show Them" (with The Warning)	Kobato; The Warning	Band-Maid; The Warning	3:16
5.	"Forbidden Tale"	Atsumi		4:36
6.	"Bestie"	Kobato	Band-Maid; Mike Einziger	3:40
7.	"Brightest Star"	Kobato		3:18
8.	"Letters to You"	Atsumi		3:11
9.	"The One"	Kobato		4:11
10.	"Memorable"	Kobato; Atsumi		3:17
11.	"Go Easy"	Kobato		3:02
12.	"Toi et moi" (You and Me)	Kobato		2:59
13.	"Tamaya!"	Atsumi		3:19
14.	"Get to the Top"	(instrumental)		3:08

=== DVD/Blu-ray (limited edition) ===
Limited edition with Blu-ray or DVD featuring the Day of Maid recorded live at Zepp Haneda on May 10, 2024.

Limited edition DVD/Blu-ray track listing
No.	Title	Length
1.	"Black Hole"
2.	"Giovanni"
3.	"Balance"
4.	"Hate?"
5.	"Shambles"
6.	"Spark" (Hibana, 火花)
7.	"I Still Seek Revenge."
8.	"Why Why Why"
9.	"Manners"
10.	"From Now On"
11.	"After Life"
12.	"Go Easy"
13.	"Memorable"
14.	"About Us"
15.	"Bestie"
16.	"Corallium"
17.	"Brightest Star"
18.	"Unleash!!!!!"
19.	"H-G-K"
20.	"Influencer"
21.	"Magie"
22.	"No God"

== Personnel ==
Band-Maid

- Saiki Atsumi – lead vocals (except track 7), cover art production
- Miku Kobato – rhythm guitar, vocals (lead vocals on track 7)
- Kanami Tōno – lead guitar
- Misa – bass
- Akane Hirose – drums

Additional personnel

- Daniela Villarreal – co-lead vocals, guitar on track 4
- Paulina Villarreal – drums on track 4
- Alejandra Villarreal – bass on track 4

Production

- Band-Maid – sound producer
- Masahiko Fukui – mixing (except track 4) and mastering
- Masayoshi Yamamoto – mixing (track 4) and recording engineer
- The Butler – jacket illustration
- Masashi Nakazato – art direction
- Yuta Sekiguchi – art design

== Charts ==
Chart performance for Epic Narratives
Chart (2024)	Peak position
Japanese Albums (Oricon)	8
Japanese Digital Albums (Oricon)	8
Japanese Combined Albums (Oricon)	12
Japanese Hot Albums (Billboard Japan)	10
