= Maid in Japan =

Studio album by Band-Maid
- Released: January 8, 2014
- Recorded: 2013
- Length: 30:24 (original); 38:06 (reissue)
- Language: Japanese
- Label: Gump; Crown Stones

Band-Maid chronology
Maid in Japan (2014)	New Beginning (2015)

2018 reissue cover

Maid in Japan is the debut mini-album by Japanese all-female rock band Band-Maid. It was released on January 8, 2014. The album did not chart during its initial release. The album was reissued with two bonus tracks on February 14, 2018, and that version reached number 26 on the Japanese Oricon Albums Chart, selling 2,994 copies.

== Track listing ==
All lyrics are written by Kentarō Akutsu, except where indicated.

No.	Title	Lyrics	Music	Arrangement	Length
1.	"Be OK"		Akutsu	Band-Maid; Akutsu	4:13
2.	"Ever Green"		Masahiko Fukui	Band-Maid; Fukui	3:43
3.	"Key"		Akutsu	Band-Maid; Akutsu	3:40
4.	"Bye My Tears"		Akutsu	Band-Maid; Akutsu	3:12
5.	"Knockin' on Your Heart"		Fukui	Band-Maid; Fukui	3:52
6.	"Big Dad"	G-YUNcoSANDY; Akutsu	Fukui	Band-Maid; Fukui	3:26
7.	"Yoake mae (夜明け前)" (trad. Before Dawn)		Fukui	Band-Maid; Fukui	3:29
8.	"Forward"		Akutsu	Band-Maid; Akutsu	4:49
Total length:					30:24

Reissue edition bonus tracks
No.	Title	Music	Arrangement	Length
9.	"Ai to Jōnetsu no Matador (愛と情熱のマタドール)" (trad. Love, Passion, Matador)	Akutsu	Band-Maid; Akutsu	3:18
10.	"Summer Drive"	Akutsu	Band-Maid; Akutsu	4:24
Total length:				38:06

== Personnel ==
Band-Maid

- Saiki Atsumi – lead vocals (except tracks 6 and 10)
- Miku Kobato – rhythm guitar, vocals, lead vocals on tracks 6 and 10
- Kanami Tōno – lead guitar
- Misa – bass
- Akane Hirose – drums

== Charts ==
Chart (2018)	Peak position
Japan Top Albums (Billboard)	22
Japanese Albums (Oricon)	26
