= New Beginning (Band-Maid album) =

Studio album by Band-Maid
- Released: November 18, 2015
- Recorded: 2015
- Studio: Studio Birdman West; Sound Crew Studio; Bungee Studio, Tokyo; Thomas Studio, Kyoto
- Genre: Hard rock; heavy metal
- Length: 32:47
- Language: Japanese; English
- Label: Gump

Band-Maid chronology
Maid in Japan (2014)	New Beginning (2015)	Brand New Maid (2016)

Music videos
- "Thrill" on YouTube
- "Real Existence" on YouTube
- "Don't Let Me Down" on YouTube

New Beginning is the second mini-album released by all-female Japanese hard rock band Band-Maid. It is the band's final release under Gump Records, as they joined Nippon Crown the following year. The album reached number 64 on the Japanese Oricon Albums Chart. The album was originally scheduled to be released on November 4, 2015, but was pushed back two weeks.

New Beginning has been described as hard rock, and heavy metal and the band's sound has been compared to the likes of Disturbed, Lenny Kravitz and Skunk Anansie. Music videos were produced for the songs "Thrill," "Real Existence," and "Don't Let Me Down."

== Track listing ==
No.	Title	Lyrics	Music	Length
1.	"Thrill"	Kentaro Akutsu, Miku Kobato	Akutsu	4:04
2.	"Freezer"	Daria Kawashima	Atsushi Yamaguchi	3:15
3.	"Real Existence"	Miwa Sasaki	Koji Goto (ck 510)	4:11
4.	"Price of Pride"	Shiniki Yamashita	Taishi Senda	3:27
5.	"Arcadia Girl"	Yamashita	Masazumi Ozawa	4:04
6.	"Don't Apply the Brake"	Kawashima	Yamaguchi	3:19
7.	"Beauty and the Beast"	Kawashima	Hiroki Kawazoe	3:03
8.	"Don't Let Me Down"	Akihito Tokunaga	Tokunaga	3:19
9.	"Shake That!!"	Akutsu	Akutsu	4:05
Total length:				32:47

Bonus DVD
No.	Title	Length
1.	"Real Existence" (music video)	4:12
2.	"Don't Let Me Down" (music video)	3:19
Total length:		7:31

== Personnel ==
Band-Maid

- Saiki Atsumi – lead vocals (except track 7)
- Miku Kobato – rhythm guitar, vocals, lead vocals on track 7
- Kanami Tōno – lead guitar
- Misa – bass
- Akane Hirose – drums

== Charts ==
Chart (2015)	Peak position
Japan Top Albums (Billboard)	49
Japanese Albums (Oricon)	64
