= Sense (song) =

Single by Band-Maid

from the EP Unleash
- B-side: "Hibana"; "Corallium"
- Released: October 27, 2021
- Length: 11:01
- Label: Pony Canyon
- Songwriters: Miku Kobato; Band-Maid
- Producer: Band-Maid

Band-Maid singles chronology
"Different" (2020)	"Sense" (2021)

Music video
- Band-Maid "Sense" on YouTube

"Sense" is the eighth single by Japanese rock band Band-Maid, released in Japan on October 27, 2021, by Pony Canyon. The song was used as the opening theme song for the anime Platinum End.

== Composition and lyrics ==
They were approached to write "Sense" on New Year's Day 2021 and recorded it before summer. The lyrics are about the manga Platinum End. They were given free range with the lyrics, except that they had to include the words "angel" and "premonition". The orchestral intro was not originally part of the song, lead guitarist Kanami Tōno composed it after the producers of the anime asked them to include it.

"Hibana" was used in the Japanese e-sports competition game Rainbow Six Siege, which the lyrics are based on.

"Corallium" is lead vocalist Saiki Atsumi's first lyrical composition. Rhythm guitarist/vocalist Miku Kobato also wrote lyrics for the song, but Atsumi's lyrics were chosen instead. The song is about the ocean, which she is afraid of. She stated that she thinks the ocean is similar to love. Atsumi asked Tōno to write a song similar to "Alone" or "Choose Me".

== Background and release ==
The single was released in three versions: a limited edition which contains the CD, a Blu-ray of six songs recorded at an online concert on May 10, 2021, a second limited edition which contains the CD and a DVD of the aforementioned concert, and a standard edition which only contains the CD. "Sense" and "Corallium" appeared on their EP Unleash.

== Critical reception ==
Raijin Rock called it the best single/EP of the year and said that the songs are "... frenetic, furious, hypnotic, insane, manic." JRock News said of the title track "Every part of it packs punches and you're left without a second of rest." JaME said that "... none of the three songs on this energy bomb of a single would sound out of place on the January release." Trent Cannon of Rice Digital said that the title track is "... every bit as dramatic and soaring as the best metal bands".

== Music video ==
The music video for "Sense" was released on October 27, 2021, directed by Ryoji Aoki.

== Track listing ==
CD

All music is composed by Band-Maid.

No.	Title	Lyrics	Length
1.	"Sense"	Miku Kobato	3:25
2.	"Spark" (Hibana, 火花)	Kobato	3:40
3.	"Corallium"	Saiki Atsumi	3:56

Blu-ray/DVD

All lyrics are written by Miku Kobato; all music is composed by Band-Maid.

No.	Title	Length
1.	"I Still Seek Revenge."
2.	"Youth"
3.	"Why Why Why"
4.	"H-G-K"
5.	"Chemical Reaction"
6.	"Ambition" (Honkai, 本懐)

== Credits and personnel ==
Credits adapted from the "Sense" single liner notes.

Band-Maid members

- Misa – bass
- Miku Kobato – vocals, guitar
- Saiki Atsumi – vocals
- Akane Hirose – drums
- Kanami Tōno – guitar

Recording and management

- Sound producer: Band-Maid
- Recording Engineer: Masyoshi Yamamoto
- Mix Engineer: Masahiko Fukui
- Mastered: Masahiko Fukui
- Cover design: Saiki Atsumi
- Jacket illustration: The Butler
- Art direction: Masashi Nakazato (Number Inc.)
- Design: Yuta Sekiguchi (Number Inc.)

== Charts ==
Chart (2021)	Peak position
Japan (Oricon)	14
Japan Top Singles Sales (Billboard)	13

== Release history ==
Region	Date	Format	Label
Japan	October 27, 2021	CD; digital download	Pony Canyon
Japan	October 27, 2021	CD with Blu-ray	Pony Canyon
Japan	October 27, 2021	CD with DVD	Pony Canyon
Worldwide	October 27, 2021	Digital download	Pony Canyon
