= Scooooop (EP) =

EP by Band-Maid
- Released: October 22, 2025
- Length: 29:00
- Language: Japanese
- Label: Pony Canyon
- Producer: Band-Maid

Band-Maid chronology
| Epic Narratives (2024) | Scooooop (2025) |

Singles from Scooooop
- 1. "Zen" Released: January 12, 2025; 2. "Ready to Rock" Released: April 3, 2025; 3. "What is Justice?" Released: July 17, 2025

Scooooop is the third extended play by Japanese rock band Band-Maid. The EP was released by Pony Canyon on October 22, 2025. Its eight tracks include an instrumental, "Lock and Load", and three anime tie-ins previously released in 2025, "Zen" (Zenshu), "Ready to Rock" (Rock Is a Lady's Modesty), and "What is Justice?" (Tougen Anki).

== Track listing ==
All music written by Band-Maid.

Scooooop track listing
| No. | Title | Lyrics | Length |
|---|---|---|---|
| 1. | "Present Perfect" | Miku Kobato | 3:52 |
| 2. | "Ready to Rock" | Saiki Atsumi | 3:33 |
| 3. | "What is Justice?" | Kobato | 3:24 |
| 4. | "Super Sunshine" | Atsumi | 3:51 |
| 5. | "Sion" | Kobato | 4:14 |
| 6. | "Dilly-Dally" | Kobato; Atsumi | 2:49 |
| 7. | "Zen" | Atsumi | 3:40 |
| 8. | "Lock and Load" | (instrumental) | 3:21 |
| Total length: | | | 29:00 |

=== DVD/Blu-ray (Limited Edition) ===
| No. | Title | Length |
|---|---|---|
| 1. | "Zen" (Instrumental video) |
| 2. | "Ready to Rock" (Instrumental video) |
| 3. | "What is Justice?" (Instrumental video) |
