= Band-Maid =

Japanese rock band

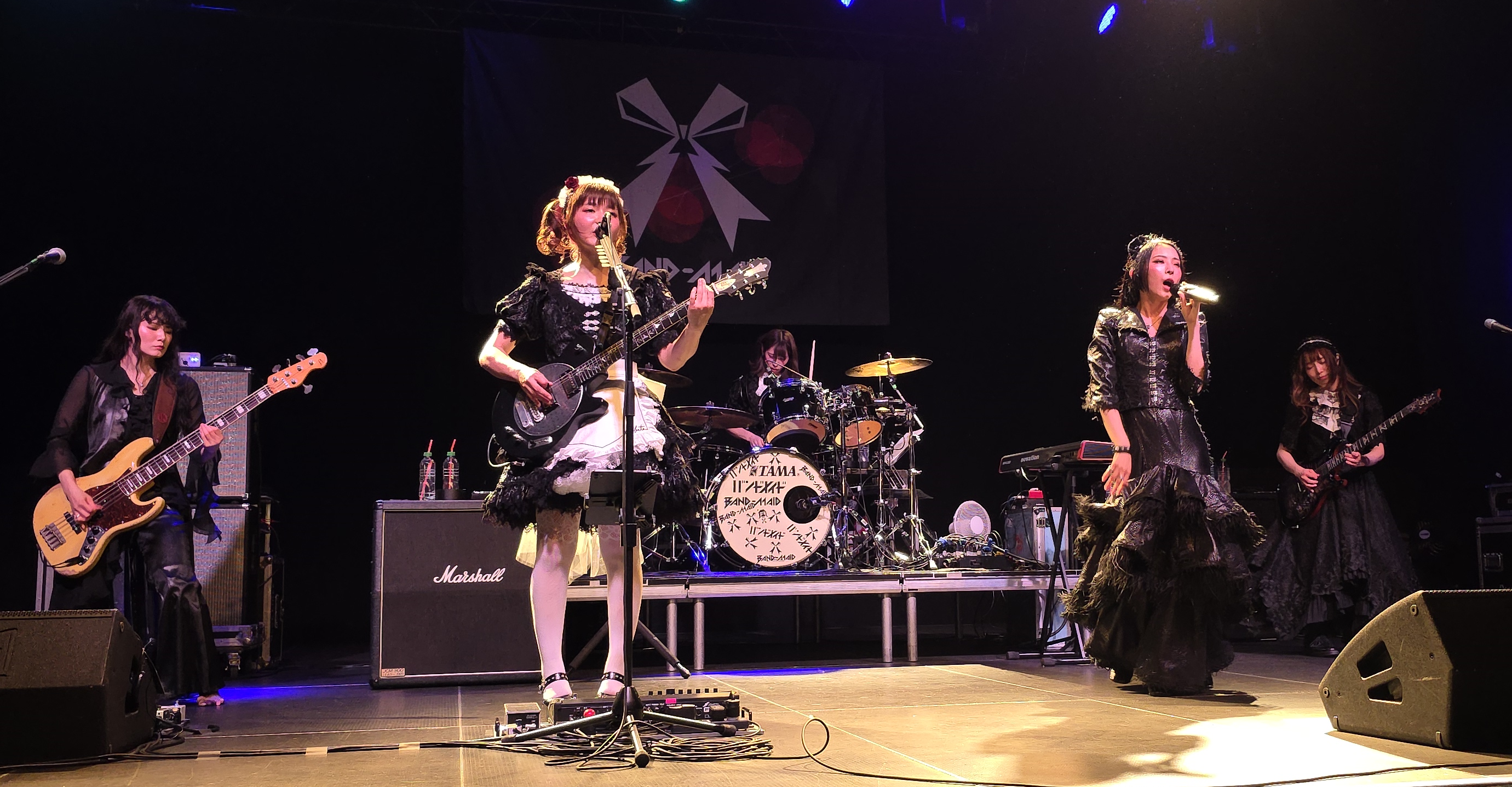
- Band-Maid performing at Batschkapp in Frankfurt, June 2026 (L–R: Misa, Miku Kobato, Akane Hirose, Saiki Atsumi, Kanami Tōno)

Background information
- Also known as: Band-Maiko
- Origin: Japan
- Genres: Hard rock; heavy metal; pop rock
- Works: Band-Maid discography
- Years active: 2013–present
- Labels: Gump; Crown Stones; Revolver; Pony Canyon; JPU (Europe and North America)
- Members: Miku Kobato; Kanami Tōno; Akane Hirose; Misa; Saiki Atsumi
- Website: bandmaid.tokyo

Band-Maid is a Japanese rock band formed in 2013, comprising singer Saiki Atsumi, guitarist/singer Miku Kobato, lead guitarist Kanami Tōno, bassist Misa, and drummer Akane Hirose. The band combines hard rock music with costumes modeled on Japanese maid cafés. They are currently signed to Pony Canyon. Their most recent studio recording, the EP Scooooop, was released in October 2025.

== History ==
=== 2013–2014: Early years and Maid in Japan ===
Band-Maid's official logo (2014–2017)

From 2012 to early 2013, Miku Kobato was a member of the idol group Lil Cumin, alongside Yuki Yano and Risa Aoyagi. The group released three singles, "Imishin Spicin," "Hatsukoi Ribbon," and "Super Trooper". After Lil Cumin disbanded, Kobato pitched her new management an idea: A band, wearing "cute" (kawaii) costumes modeled on those she had worn working in maid cafés, playing "cool" (kakkoii) music. Management agreed that this juxtaposition was interesting and agreed to back the project. Lead guitarist Kanami Tōno was recruited after Kobato saw videos she had posted to YouTube. Tōno then recruited drummer Akane Hirose and Hirose in turn recuited bassist Misa, with whom she had previously performed. On July 24, 2013, they performed for the first time as a quartet, with Kobato singing, at the PP Band Audition held at Otsuka Deepa. The band then decided to recruit an additional lead singer and selected Saiki Atsumi during auditions. Their first performance as a five-piece was at the P Festival at Shibuya-AX on August 22, 2013. The band signed to Gump Records (an imprint of the Platinum Passport artist management and talent agency) that year.

Band-Maid began performing live regularly in Tokyo. They released their debut mini-album Maid in Japan in January 2014, written in collaboration with musicians Masahiko Fukui and Kentaro Akutsu. In August 2014, they released the maxi-single "Ai to Jōnetsu no Matador" (titled "Love, Passion, Matador" internationally).

=== 2015–2017: International recognition, New Beginning, Brand New Maid, and Just Bring It ===
Band-Maid first gained international notice in April 2015 when the English-language Facebook page of internet radio station Jrock Radio promoted the music video for "Thrill", which led to over 1 million views in the following year. In November 2015 they released their sophomore mini-album New Beginning, reaching No. 64 on the Japanese Oricon weekly albums chart. The band undertook a tour of Tokyo venues to promote the album through February 2016, culminating in a sold-out concert on February 14. In March 2016 they had their first overseas performance at Sakura-Con in Seattle, Washington.

The group released their third mini-album and major label debut, Brand New Maid, in May 2016 on the Nippon Crown sub-label Crown Stones, followed by a JPU Records release in Europe in July. The album reached No. 19 on the Japanese Oricon weekly albums chart. In October and November 2016, they went on their first world tour that took them to Mexico, Hong Kong, and several countries in Europe.

In January 2017, Band-Maid released their first full-length album titled Just Bring It. It was preceded by the single "YOLO", released in November 2016. Just Bring It reached No. 16 on the Japanese Oricon weekly albums chart. Band-Maid appeared at the 2017 Golden Melody Awards and festival in Taiwan on June 23–24. The maxi-single "Daydreaming/Choose Me" was released in July 2017. They covered "Honey" for the November 2017 Mucc tribute album Tribute of Mucc -En-.

=== 2018–2019: Overseas tours, World Domination, and Conqueror ===
The band released their second full-length album titled World Domination in February 2018, reaching No. 9 on the Japanese Oricon weekly albums chart. On the same day, Maid in Japan was reissued with two bonus tracks. While the original release of that album had not charted, the reissued version reached No. 26 on the Oricon weekly albums chart. On April 1, 2018, they performed at Warped Tour at Makuhari Messe as the first date of a world tour. The maxi-single "Start Over" was released in July 2018.

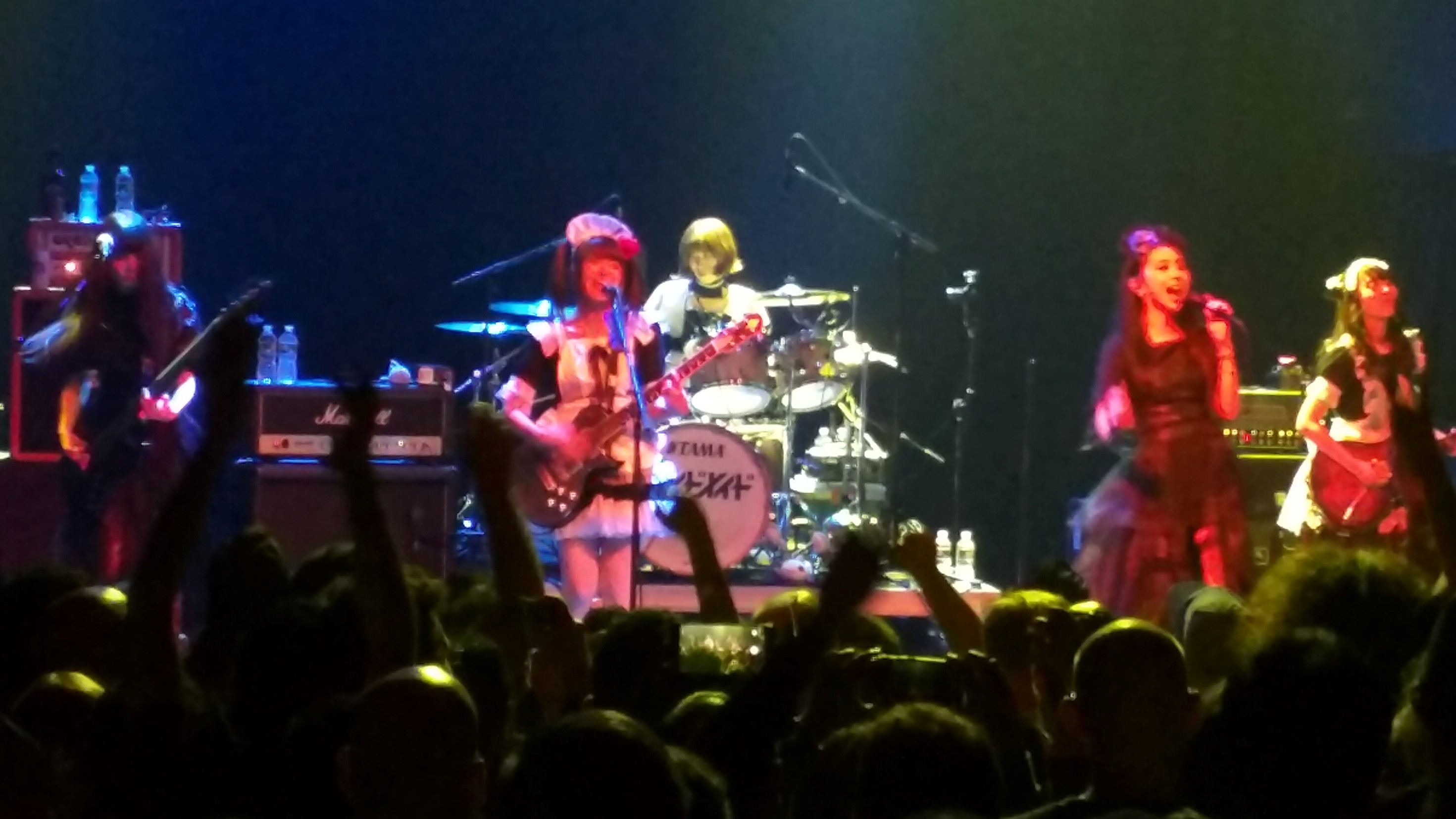
Band-Maid performing at Gramercy Theatre in New York City, September 2019

The singles "Glory" and Bubble" were released simultaneously in January 2019. "Glory" serves as the second ending theme for the second season of the Japanese anime series Yu-Gi-Oh! VRAINS, while "Bubble" serves as the theme song for the Japanese drama series Perfect Crime. In April, under the name Band-Maiko and adopting a maiko image, the band released an EP titled Band-Maiko, which adapted several previous Band-Maid songs with traditional Japanese musical instruments and lyrics in the Kyoto dialect. In the same month, the band announced a tour of the United Kingdom, France, Germany, Taiwan, and the United States in partnership with Live Nation Entertainment. Later in 2019, the band signed a new deal with Revolver Records.

The band's third full-length album, Conqueror, was released in December 2019, including an English language song, "The Dragon Cries", produced by Tony Visconti. It debuted at No. 9 on Oricon's Albums chart, and at No. 1 on Oricon's Rock Albums chart.

=== 2020–2023: Move to Pony Canyon, Unseen World, and Unleash ===
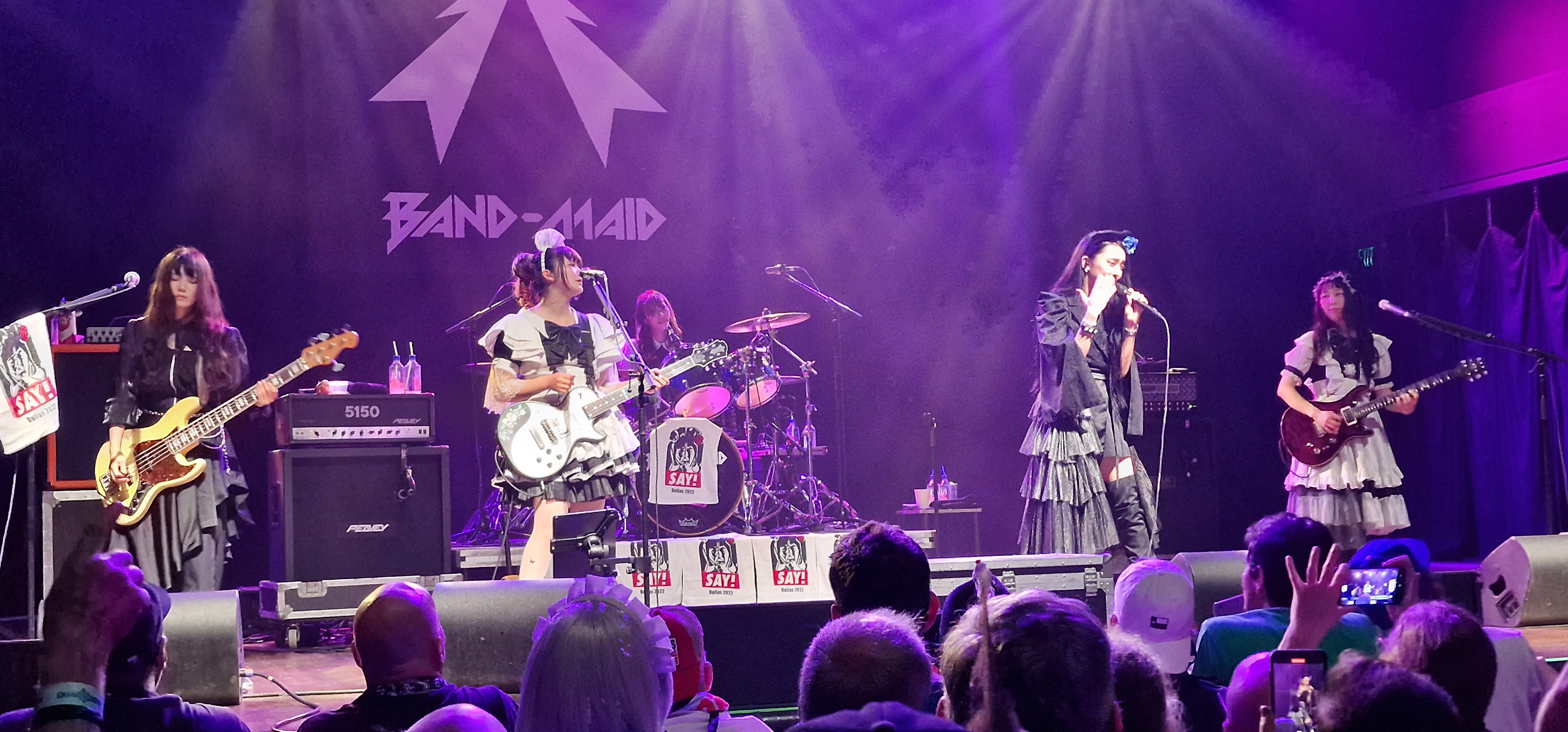
Band-Maid performing at House of Blues in Dallas, October 2022

Band-Maid released their first standalone concert video Band-Maid World Domination Tour [Shinka] at Line Cube Shibuya in April 2020. In late 2020, the band left Revolver Records and signed with Pony Canyon. The non-album single "Different" was released in December 2020; the song also served as the opening theme for the Japanese anime series Log Horizon: Destruction of the Round Table. The band's fourth full-length album, Unseen World, was released in January 2021. It debuted at No. 8 on Japanese Oricon weekly albums chart and at No. 1 on the Oricon weekly Rock Albums chart. Band member Miku Kobato, under the stage name Cluppo, released the solo single "Peace & Love" in April and the double single "Peace & Love/Flapping Wings" in August of the same year. In March 2022 the EP Hatofull was released, followed by a new single, "With You" in July 2022, which served as the ending theme for the Japanese anime series Smile of the Arsnotoria.

In January 2021, guitar brand Zemaitis released a signature guitar for guitarist Miku Kobato under the name "Flappy Pigeon". Band-Maid made a cameo appearance in the 2021 Netflix film Kate, playing themselves in a concert scene. Their songs "Blooming" and "Choose Me" were used in the film. The single "Sense" was released in October 2021; the song also served as the opening theme for the Japanese anime series Platinum End. In December 2021, they announced a second US tour, including an appearance at Aftershock Festival, which took place in late 2022. "Choose Me" was used in the US TV series Peacemaker. Band-Maid released an EP titled Unleash on September 21, 2022. Band-Maid opened for Guns N' Roses on their We're F'N' Back! Tour on November 6.

In early January 2023, the band announced a tenth anniversary tour, planned to begin in March in Japan, with U.S. shows in May and August, and culminating with a show at Yokohama Arena in November 2023. The band appeared as the opening act for The Last Rockstars on their American tour dates in February 2023. The band also appeared in several rock festivals in the US: Welcome to Rockville, Sonic Temple Art & Music Festival, and Pointfest in May 2023, and Lollapalooza in August 2023. The band released two greatest hits albums in August 2023. In the same month, the band released the single "Shambles", which served as the ending theme for the second season of the Japanese anime series Kengan Ashura.

=== 2024–present: Epic Narratives and Scooooop ===
On April 17, Band-Maid released "Bestie", a song written with Mike Einziger of the band Incubus, and on May 1, Band-Maid was the opener for Incubus' show in Tokyo. On June 12, Band-Maid played a two-man show with Mexican rock band The Warning, debuting "Show Them", a song co-written with The Warning; a recorded version followed on August 7. In July, Band-Maid released the anime tie-in "Protect You" which served as the ending theme for Grendizer U. All three songs later appeared on Epic Narratives, released on September 25, 2024. In November 2024, Tōno released a limited edition signature guitar in collaboration with PRS Guitars.

In the first half of 2025, Band-Maid released three anime tie-in songs. "Zen" served as the opening theme for Zenshu, "Ready to Rock" was the opening song for Rock Is a Lady's Modesty (for which Hirose, Tōno, Misa, and Atsumi provided motion capture), and "What is Justice?" was an ending theme for Tougen Anki. After touring Japan throughout the year, Band-Maid released their third EP, titled Scooooop, on October 22, 2025.

During their concert at Tokyo Garden Theatre on December 7, 2025, the band announced their upcoming world tour for 2026, including shows in Asia, Europe, and North America. In November 2026, they will play at the Nippon Budokan arena for the first time.

== Image and music ==
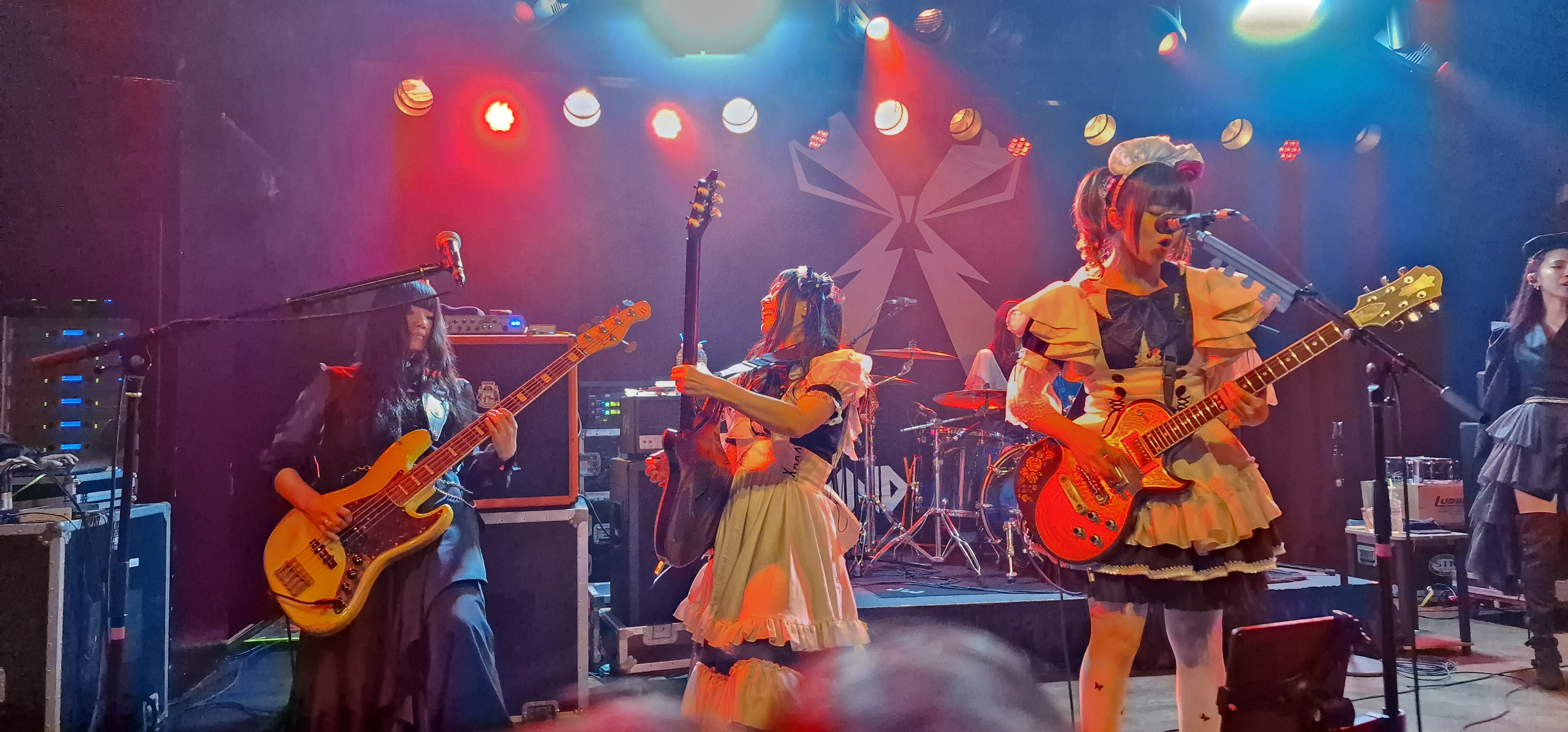
During live performances, referred to as "servings", band members wear elaborate maid costumes (L-R: Misa, Kanami Tōno, Miku Kobato; Boston, 2022)

Band-Maid's image is modeled on maid café hostesses, with the standard uniform adapted to match each member's personality. In interviews, they explained the concept came from founding member Miku Kobato who had previously worked at a maid café in Akihabara. This theme is reinforced by the band, who refer to their male fans as "masters", their female fans as "princesses", and their concerts as "servings". The band's cute (kawaii) maid appearance is meant to contrast with their aggressive (kakkoii) rock style. They decided to have two vocalists to allow a larger variety of music with two different voice types.

The "servings" are usually interrupted by a pause where the members present some comedic interaction with the audience. This is called "omajinai time" and mainly performed by Kobato. This performance includes calls and responses of "moe moe kyun" which comes from anime movies and maid cafés to show cuteness.

Kobato loved Japanese enka music when she was a child, and Tokyo Jihen led her to rock. She attended a vocal school around 2012, but started playing guitar with the formation of Band-Maid the following year. Atsumi aspired to sing because of her love for Namie Amuro and started singing when she was 14 years old. Band-Maid is her first band. Tōno is a big fan of Carlos Santana, has played classical piano since she was a child, and began playing guitar when she joined her high school band club. Hirose is a fan of Deep Purple and Maximum the Hormone, particularly the latter's female drummer Nao Kawakita, and also played trombone and piano. Misa likes Paz Lenchantin, The Smashing Pumpkins, and Jimi Hendrix; she started playing piano at around 3 or 4 years of age, and also played trumpet, alto horn, and guitar.

== Band members ==
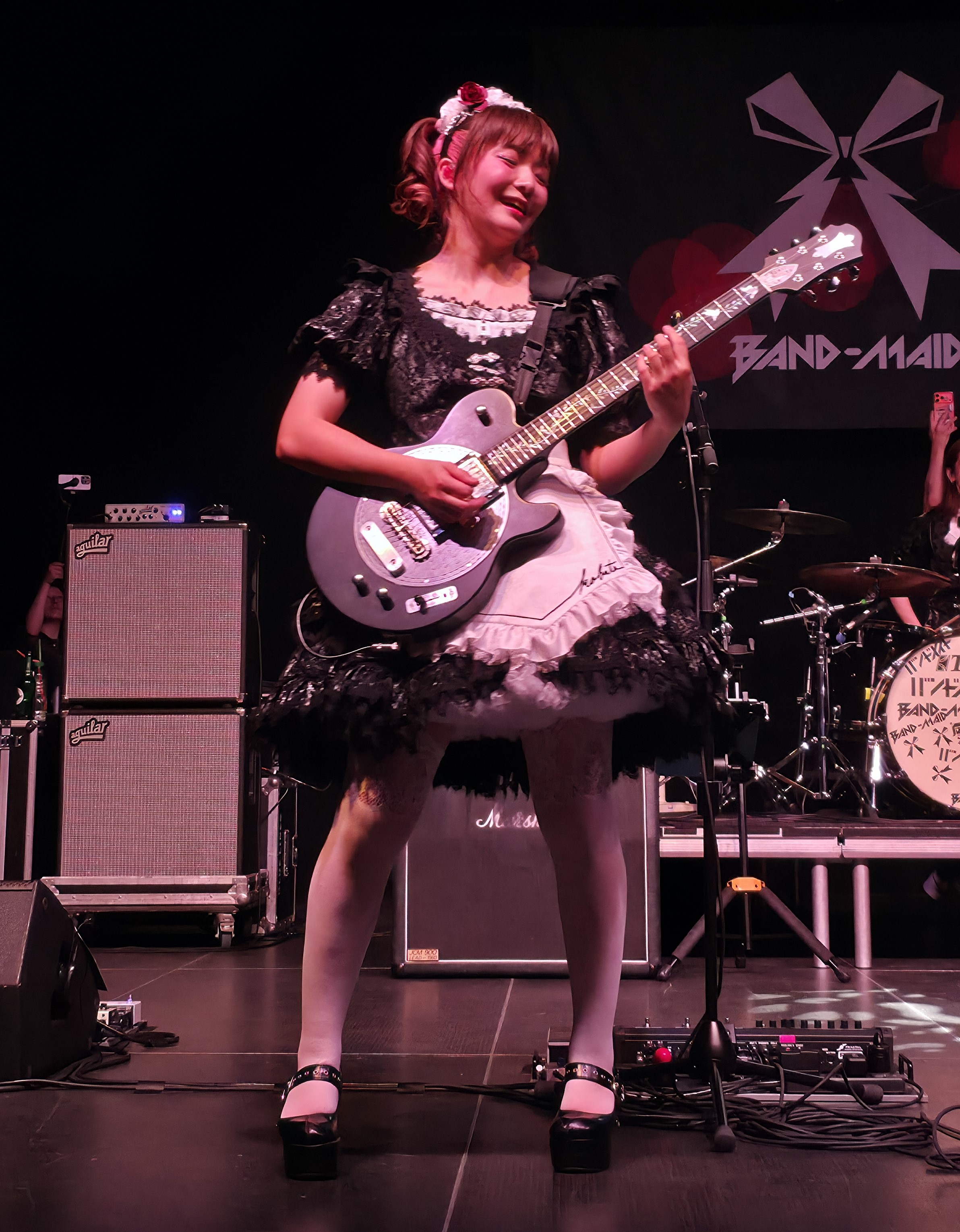
Miku Kobato

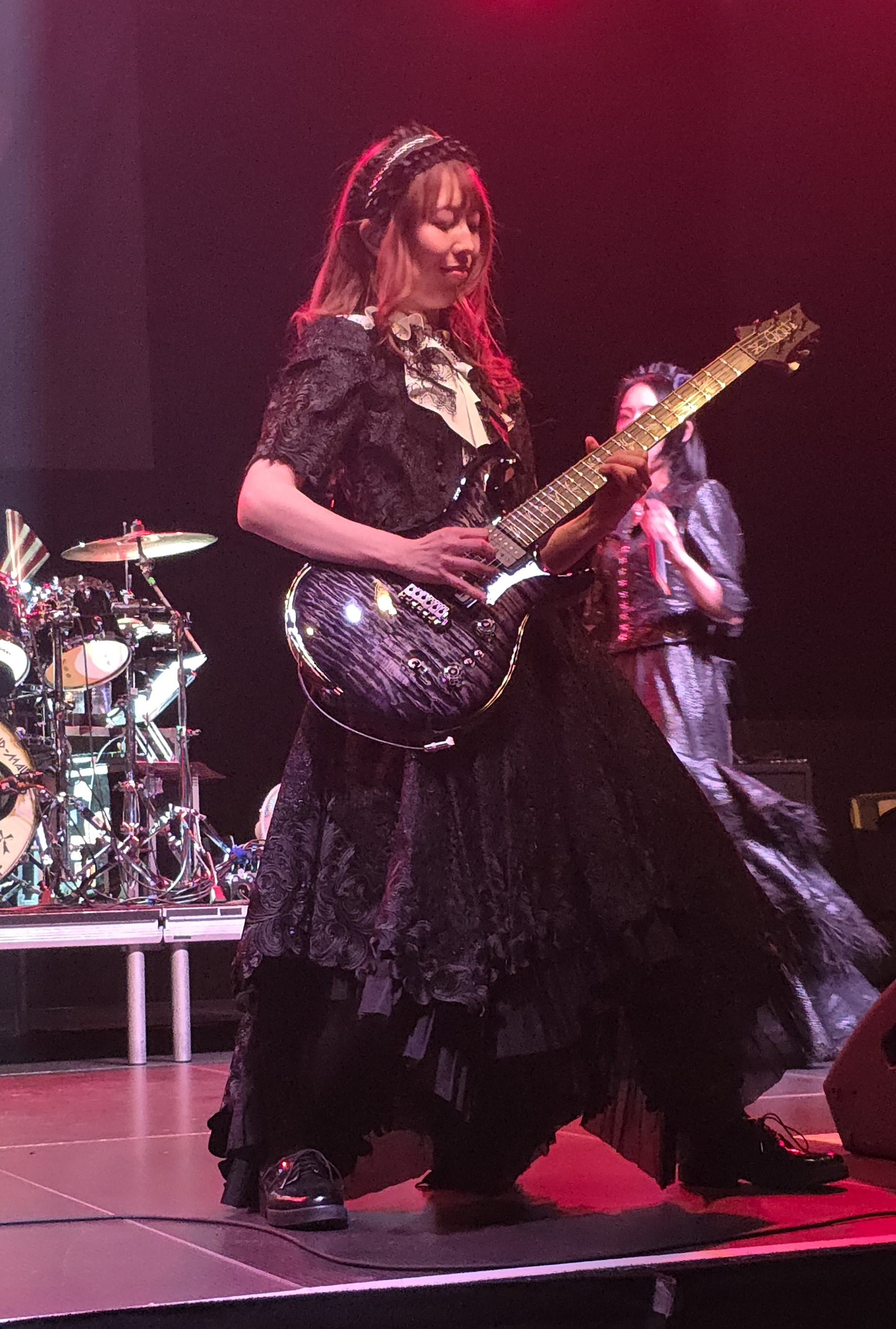
Kanami Tōno

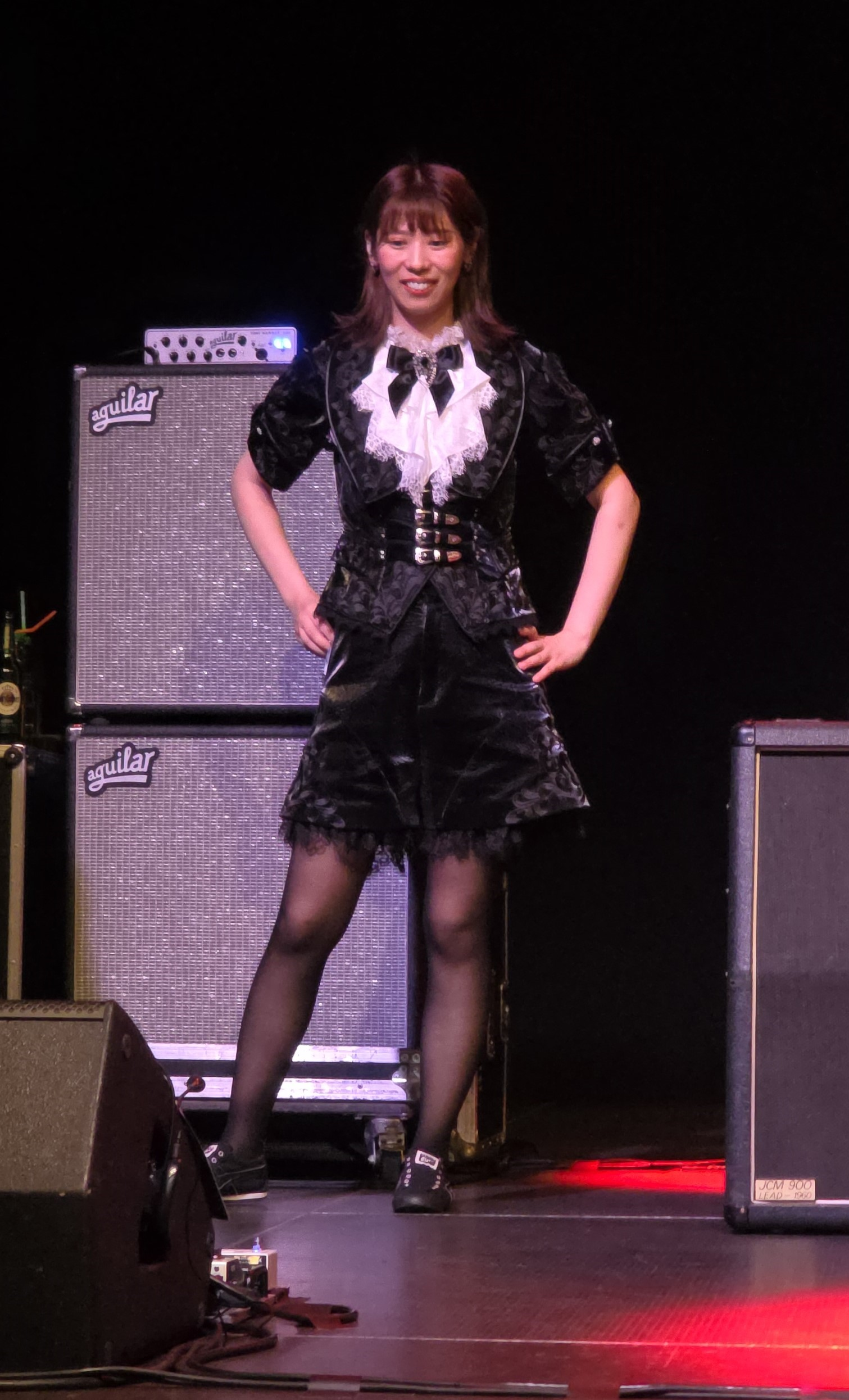
Akane Hirose

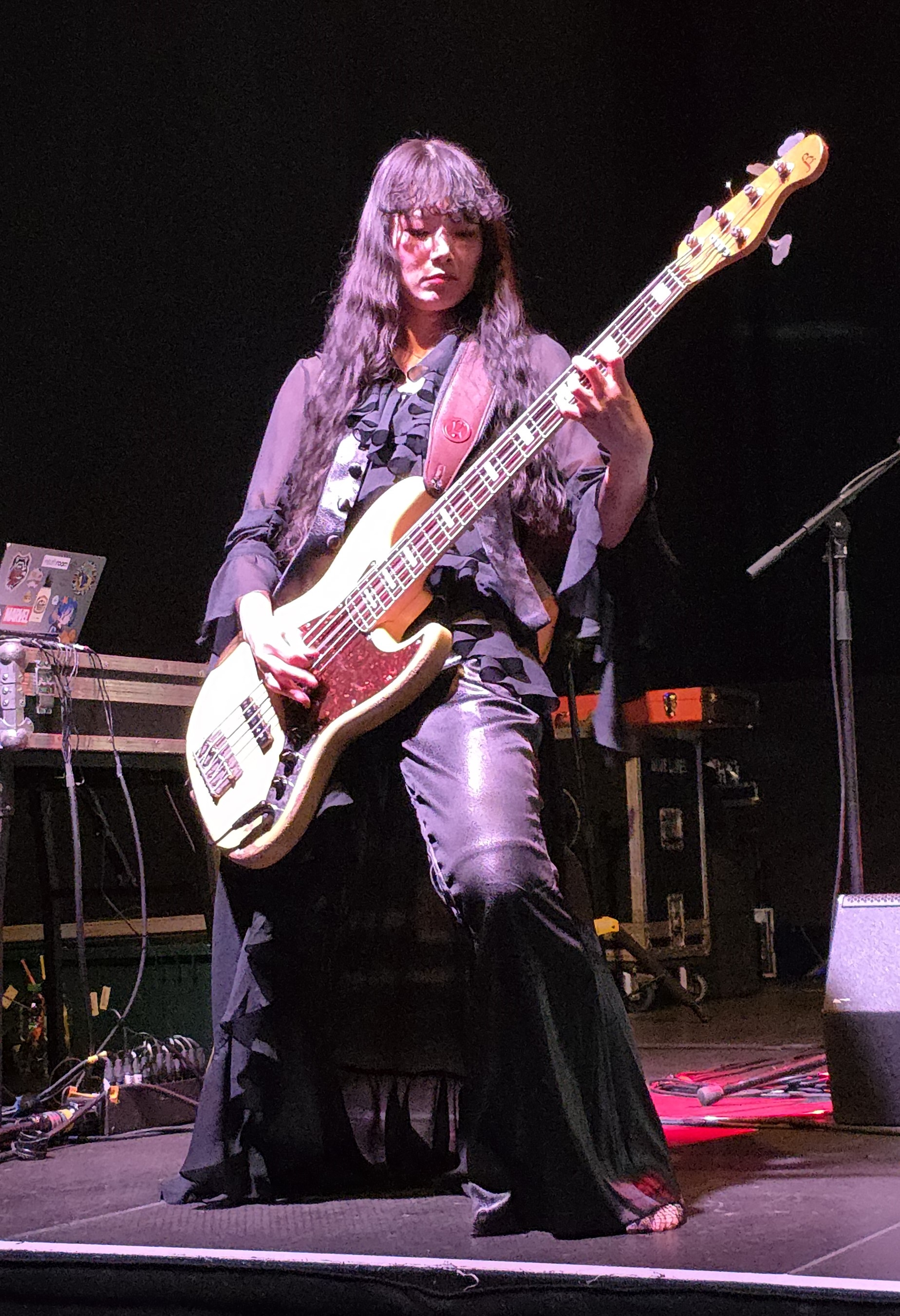
Misa

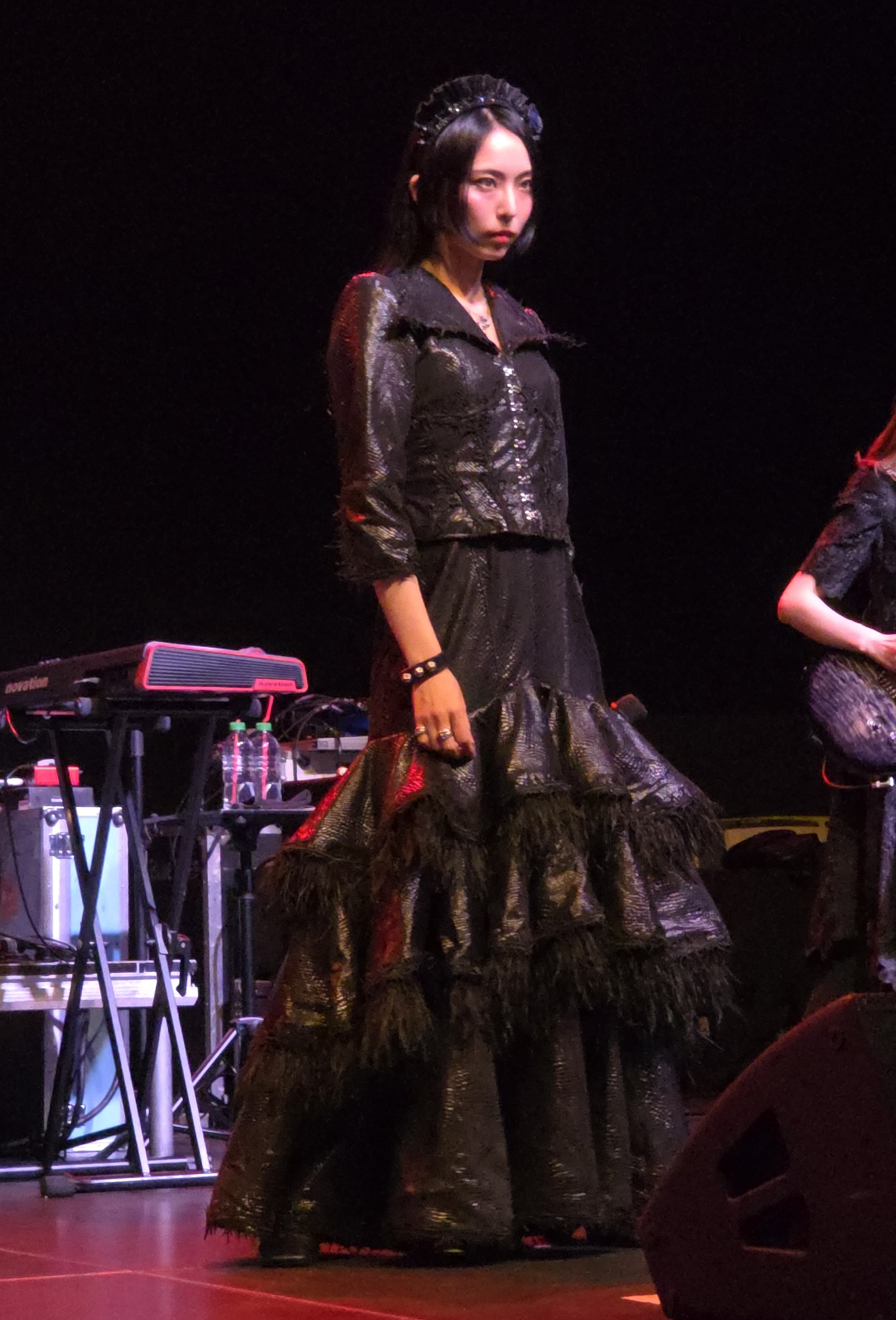
Saiki Atsumi
- Miku Kobato (小鳩 ミク) – rhythm guitar, backing and lead vocals (2013–present)
- Kanami Tōno (遠乃 歌波) – lead guitar, backing vocals (2013–present)
- Akane Hirose (廣瀬 茜) – drums, percussion (2013–present)
- Misa – bass, backing vocals (2013–present)
- Saiki Atsumi (厚見 彩姫) – lead vocals, occasional keyboard (2013–present)

== Discography ==
- Maid in Japan (2014)
- New Beginning (2015)
- Brand New Maid (2016)
- Just Bring It (2017)
- World Domination (2018)
- Conqueror (2019)
- Unseen World (2021)
- Epic Narratives (2024)

== Awards and nominations ==
Award ceremony	Year	Category	Nominee(s)/work(s)	Result	Ref.
Classic Rock Roll of Honour Awards	2016	Japan Next Generation	Band-Maid	Won	
Neo Awards	2020	Best Musical Act	Band-Maid	Won	
