= Brand New Maid =

Studio album by Band-Maid
- Released: May 18, 2016
- Recorded: 2016
- Studio: Studio Birdman West; Sound Crew Studio; St. Soul B1; Scrambles Studio; Nasoundra Palace Studio, Tokyo; Thomas Studio, Kyoto, Japan
- Genre: Hard rock
- Length: 31:09
- Language: Japanese
- Label: Crown Stones (Japan); JPU (international)

Band-Maid chronology
New Beginning (2015)	Brand New Maid (2016)	Just Bring It (2017)

Music videos
- "The Non-Fiction Days" on YouTube
- "Before Yesterday" on YouTube
- "Alone" on YouTube

Brand New Maid is the third studio album by Japanese all-female rock band Band-Maid. It was released on May 18, 2016, and was their first album to be released internationally. Music videos were made for "The Non-Fiction Days," "Before Yesterday," and "Alone." The album reached number 19 on the Japanese Oricon Albums Chart, selling 4,189 copies in its first week.

The international album from JPU Records includes English lyric translations, Romaji lyric transliterations, and the live bonus track "Real Existence".

== Critical reception ==
JaME gave the album a positive review, saying "...they are serious about and capable of realizing their goal of "world domination." J-Generation noted that the album was "bigger, tougher, deeper" than the band's previous releases and that it "...proves Band-Maid’s ready to crush any protests that their cute persona disqualifies them from the "real rock" club.

=== Accolades ===
Chama and Chiaki of Gekirock listed the album as the fourth and sixth best album of 2016, respectively.

== Track listing ==
No.	Title	Lyrics	Music	Arrangement	Length
1.	"The Non-Fiction Days"	Kanata Nakamura	Toshinari Ohnishi	Onishi	4:44
2.	"Look at Me"	Miwa Sasaki	Koji Goto (ck510)	Goto	4:00
3.	"Order"	Sasaki	Akihito Tokunaga	Tokunaga	3:24
4.	"Brand-New Road"	Shinichiro Yamashita	Goto	Goto	3:55
5.	"Yuragu"	Miku Kobato; Saiki Atsumi	Atsushi Yamaguchi	Spinstealthspike	4:05
6.	"Freedom"	Kobato	Ichiro Iguchi	Scrambles	3:46
7.	"Before Yesterday"	Nakamura	Hitoshi Okamoto	Okamoto	3:47
8.	"Alone"	Kobato; Atsumi	Band-Maid	Band-Maid	3:28
Total length:					31:09

Alternative edition bonus track
No.	Title	Lyrics	Music	Length
9.	"Real Existence" (live)	Sasaki Masakazu	Goto	4:26
Total length:				35:35

== Personnel ==
Band–Maid

- Saiki Atsumi – lead vocals
- Miku Kobato – rhythm guitar, vocals
- Kanami Tōno – lead guitar
- Misa – bass
- Akane Hirose – drums

== Charts ==
Chart (2016)	Peak position
Japan Top Albums (Billboard)	15
Japanese Albums (Oricon)	19

== External listings ==
- Brand New Maid Listing at JPU Records (in English)
