= Platinum End =

Japanese manga series

- First tankōbon volume cover, featuring Mirai Kakehashi

プラチナエンド (Purachina Endo)
- Genre: Dark fantasy; Supernatural thriller
- Manga
- Written by: Tsugumi Ohba
- Illustrated by: Takeshi Obata
- Published by: Shueisha
- English publisher: NA: Viz Media
- Imprint: Jump Comics SQ.
- Magazine: Jump Square
- Original run: November 4, 2015 – January 4, 2021
- Volumes: 14
- Anime television series
- Directed by: Hideya Takahashi (Note: Credited as 1st Series Director (1stシリーズディレクター)); Kazuchika Kise (Note: Credited as 2nd Series Director (2ndシリーズディレクター))
- Written by: Shin'ichi Inozume
- Music by: Masahiro Tokuda
- Studio: Signal.MD
- Licensed by: Crunchyroll; SA/SEA: Medialink
- Original network: TBS, BS11
- Original run: October 8, 2021 – March 25, 2022
- Episodes: 24
- icon

Platinum End (Japanese: プラチナエンド, Hepburn: Purachina Endo) is a Japanese manga series written by Tsugumi Ohba and illustrated by Takeshi Obata. It was serialized in Shueisha's monthly shōnen manga magazine Jump Square from November 2015 to January 2021, with its chapters collected in 14 tankōbon volumes. The series follows Mirai Kakehashi, a student who attempts suicide but is rescued by his guardian angel, Nasse, who not only has vowed to protect him, but bestows him special powers as he is also one of 13 candidates chosen by different angels to take the role of God, who is to retire in 999 days. Platinum End is licensed by Viz Media in North America. A 24-episode anime television series adaptation by Signal.MD aired from October 2021 to March 2022.

== Plot ==
Mirai Kakehashi is a young orphaned high school student who lives with his abusive aunt and uncle after the death of his parents and brother. One day, Mirai decides he cannot take it anymore and attempts to commit suicide, but is saved by a Guardian Angel called Nasse, who also gives Mirai special powers. Upon learning from Nasse that his aunt and uncle were responsible for the deaths of his father and mother due to their jealousy and hatred toward them, Mirai uses the powers that she bestowed to him in order to enact justice upon them. This is only the beginning of Mirai's story, however, as Nasse soon after informs him that God will retire in 999 days and thirteen candidates to replace him were selected, one of which is Mirai. To make matters worse, not only is Mirai forced to take part in the contest to decide the next God, but some of the other candidates will do anything to win, including killing all of the other candidates as soon as possible. To combat these ruthless killers, Mirai forms an alliance with several candidates who share his goal: to win the contest without killing any other competitors.

== Characters ==
=== Main ===
Mirai Kakehashi (架橋 明日, Kakehashi Mirai)
Voiced by: Miyu Irino, Maaya Sakamoto (young) (Japanese); Alejandro Saab (English)
Mirai was raised by his abusive uncle and aunt after his parents and younger brother were killed in a car crash. The abuse that he endured resulted in him trying to commit suicide by throwing himself from a tower block on the day of his middle school graduation, but he is saved by Nasse, who selects him as a God candidate. Using the Red Arrows, he discovers that his uncle and aunt murdered his family. He accidentally kills his aunt and then makes his uncle turn himself in. Upon learning of Metropoliman's plans, Mirai joins forces with Saki and Nanato to stop Metropoliman, not only to protect themselves, but to prevent Metropoliman from becoming God as well.
Nasse (ナッセ)
Voiced by: Yui Ogura (Japanese); Michaela Jill Murphy (English)
Nasse is Mirai's angel of the special-rank. Based on their rank, the special abilities bestowed by the angel may vary. In the case of Nasse, she grants Mirai with all three special abilities. These include Wings that enable the user to fly, a White Arrow that allows the user to instantly kill anyone it hits, and a Red arrow that allows the user to make whoever it hits fall in love with them for 33 days, though not if the target is already under the influence of another user's Red Arrow. Her main desire is to make Mirai happy. Despite having a cute face, she has the habit of making some cruel remarks.
Saki Hanakago (花籠 咲, Hanakago Saki)
Voiced by: M.A.O (Japanese); Laura Post (English)
Saki is a God candidate, who is also Mirai's classmate and love interest. Once she learns that he does not intend to kill her, Saki teams up with Mirai to deal with Metropoliman. She is Mirai's childhood friend, but Mirai was the target of bullying from his classmates after his parents' death, and Saki did nothing to stop them out of peer pressure. After having witnessed Mirai's suicide attempt in the beginning of the series, she guiltily tried to drown herself at sea, leading her to meet Revel and become a God candidate.
Revel (ルベル, Ruberu)
Voiced by: Natsuki Hanae (Japanese); Daman Mills (English)
Revel is Saki's angel of the second-rank at first. He is rather calculating and manipulative, a trait that is considered by Nasse to be the reason why he was relegated to be second-rank angel, thus only capable of bestowing Saki with a Red Arrow. Once he decides to become more useful to Saki, Revel decides to study the knowledge of the Celestial Realm, but fails to be promoted. However, he sheds tears for the first time after reflecting on his powerlessness, which promotes him to first-rank and earns him the title of "Angel of Emotion" since no angel had shed tears for a human before. This allows him to bestow Wings onto Saki.

=== Supporting ===
Kanade Uryu (生流 奏, Uryū Kanade) / Metropoliman (メトロポリマン, Metoroporiman)
Voiced by: Kaito Ishikawa (Japanese); Griffin Burns (English)
Kanade is a high school student who intends to become God's successor by any means necessary, including killing all other God candidates. He is the grandson of the principal of the prestigious Joso Academy and wishes to become God in order to bring his deceased younger sister Rea back to life. Using the alias "Metropoliman", he kills four other God candidates and claims their Wings and Red Arrows. He becomes even more dangerous upon realizing that several Arrows can be combined to increase their range, and that the obtained Wings and Red Arrows can be bestowed to ordinary humans to do his bidding.
Nanato Mukaido (六階堂 七斗, Mukaidō Nanato)
Voiced by: Toshiyuki Morikawa (Japanese); Andrew Kishino (English)
Nanato is a God candidate working as the product planner for an apparel company. He suffers from terminal cancer. Using his Red Arrows, Nanato secures enough money from the rich for his pregnant wife Aya and his daughter Nanaka after he dies, and he tries to find more God candidates by hiring private detectives. He decides to team up with Mirai and Saki in order to prevent Kanade from becoming God, to the point of obtaining firearms from the JSDF in order to have a better chance to kill him. Mirai agrees on the grounds that Nanato continues his treatment.
Hajime Sokotani (底谷 一, Sokotani Hajime)
Voiced by: Tomoaki Maeno
Hajime is a God candidate who was born poor and ugly. He was always shunned by others until his mother committed suicide and Balta appears to become his angel. After managing to get cosmetic facial surgery, Hajime is still is unable to attract a girl himself due to his poor communication skills. He idolizes Kanade and offers to become his subordinate, and Kanade accepts on the condition that Hajime captures another God candidate. After discovering Nanato's identity, he abducts Aya and Nanaka at an amusement park's house of mirrors in order to draw Nanato to a trap. Although managing to capture both Nanato and Mirai in hopes of killing them, Hajime ends up struck by Saki's Red Arrow.
Susumu Yuito (結糸向, Yuito Susumu)
Voiced by: Megumi Han
Susumu is a God candidate who is a grade school student. After Metropoliman's defeat at the amusement park, Susumu reveals the truth about the God candidates to the public while claiming to support Mirai to be God's successor.
Yuri Temari (手毬由理, Temari Yuri)
Voiced by: Saori Ōnishi (Japanese); Cristina Vee (English)
Yuri is a God candidate who is first seen enjoying a massage on a tropical island while scrolling on social media. She is the first God candidate to be captured by the police, but she manages to escape.
Shuji Nakaumi (中海修滋, Nakaumi Shuji)
Voiced by: Daiki Yamashita (Japanese); A.J. Beckles (English)
Shuji is a God candidate who is a straightforward person. He greatly believes in the concept of euthanasia and that those who wish to commit suicide must have the strong desire to do so. When Ogaro selected him as her God candidate and bestowed him a Red Arrow, Shuji used them to assist his parents and grandfather in suicide by shooting them with the Red Arrow and telling them to carry out their desires afterward.
Gaku Yoneda (米田我工, Yoneda Gaku)
Voiced by: Kenjiro Tsuda
Gaku is a God candidate who is a professor emeritus at Tokyo University. He was one of the youngest people to win Nobel Prizes in Physics and in Literature.
Meyza (メイザ, Meiza)
Voiced by: Kikuko Inoue
Meyza is Kanade's angel of the special-rank, also known as the "Angel of Greed". It is said she went from unranked to special-rank for reasons unknown even to Baret.
Baret (バレ, Bare)
Voiced by: Ai Kayano
Baret is Nanato's angel of the first-rank, also known as the "Angel of Knowledge". She once were of the special-rank, before being demoted for flaunting her knowledge too much, according to Revel.
Balta (バルタ, Baruta)
Voiced by: Hikaru Midorikawa (Japanese); Zeno Robinson (English)
Balta is Hajime's angel of the first-rank, also known as the "Angel of Intuition".
Muni (ムニ)
Voiced by: Fumi Hirano (Japanese); Anne Yatco (English)
Muni is Gaku's angel of the special-rank, also known as the "Angel of Destruction".
Penema (ぺネマ)
Voiced by: KENN
Penema is Susumu's angel of the first-rank, also known as the "Angel of Games".
Yazeli (ヤゼリ, Yazeri)
Voiced by: Ryōta Takeuchi
Yazeli is Yuri's angel of the second-rank, also known as the "Angel of Truth".
Ogaro (オガロ)
Voiced by: Romi Park (Japanese); Anne Yatco (English)
Ogaro is Shuji's angel of the first-rank, also known as the "Angel of Darkness".

=== Other ===
Tonma Rodriguez (ロドリゲス 頓馬, Rodorigesu Tonma)
Voiced by: Tomokazu Sugita
Tonma is a God candidate who is a failed comedian. He uses his Red Arrows to make women have a polyamorous relationship with him. He is the first God candidate to be killed, being murdered by Kanade as "Metropoliman".
Shogo Hatakeyama (畠山 省吾, Hatakeyama Shōgo) / Metroblue (メトロブルー, Metoroburū) and Saburo Tabuchi (田淵 三郎, Tabuchi Saburō) / Metroyellow (メトロイエロー, Metoroierō)
Voiced by: Daisuke Hirakawa (Shogo), Hiroyuki Yoshino (Saburo)
Shogo and Saburo are two God candidates who disguise themselves as different versions of Metropoliman when Kanade asks the God candidates to attend a gathering at a baseball stadium. They are friends who helped each other out after failing their college entrance exams. Before they attempt suicide by drug overdose, they are saved their angels Emaka and Egura. However, the gathering is a trap and both are killed by the real Metropoliman.
Chiyo Nakayama (中矢間 知代, Nakayama Chiyo)
Voiced by: Shiori Sugiura (Japanese); Anne Yatco (English)
Chiyo is a God candidate who is a young girl being bullied at school. She attends the gathering and asks Metropoliman for help. Kanade first strikes her with a Red Arrow. However, he then uses her as a hostage, saying he will kill her if no other God candidates reveal themselves. As none do, Kanade kills Chiyo.
Luta (ルタ, Ruta)
Voiced by: Takehito Koyasu
Luta is Tonma's angel of the second-rank.
Emaka (エマカ) and Egura (エグラ)
Emaka and Egura are Shogo and Saburo's angels respectively, both of the first-rank.
Jami (ジャミ)
Jami is Chiyo's angel of the second-rank.
Mimimi Yamada (山田 美々々, Yamada Mimimi) / Misurin (ミスリン, Misurin)
Voiced by: Kaori Maeda (Japanese); Carrie Keranen (English)
Misurin is an amateur teen model who was arrested two years ago for the murder of three female middle school students. Kanade frees her from juvenile detention and lends her a Red Arrow and Wings from the God candidates that he previously eliminated in order to lay a trap for any other God candidates who might appear to stop her once she starts killing again.

== Production ==
Following Death Note (2003–2006) and Bakuman (2008–2012), Platinum End is the third collaboration between author Tsugumi Ohba and illustrator Takeshi Obata. Koji Yoshida, the duo's editor for the entirety of Death Note, said he had told the two that he would like for the three of them to work together again. According to him, Ohba had the vague idea for Platinum End towards the end of Bakuman; one of the ideas for the many manga featured in the story was about angels, and words such as "wings" and "arrows" were thrown around at the time. After many discussions, Yoshida said things for the new series started to come together when they decided to incorporate geometric motifs. Because angels are essentially the opposite of shinigami, if Obata drew them in a traditional Gothic style, they would be too similar to Death Note. As such, although it is set in the present day, Yoshida wanted to incorporate geometric or futuristic imagery in Platinum End. He also said that, if the theme of Death Note was "evil" or "death", the theme for the new series is "happiness".

Unlike their previous works which were weekly serials, Platinum End is Ohba and Obata's first manga published with a monthly schedule. Yoshida said, with more than twice the amount of pages per chapter, the process is completely different in his opinion. Whereas with Death Note he was thinking first and foremost about the lead-in to the next week's chapter, for Platinum End the editor said he can focus more on a single chapter's story. But at the same time, he acknowledged that the longer interval between chapters requires they make them more compelling for readers to want to see what happens next.

== Media ==
=== Manga ===
Written by Tsugumi Ohba and illustrated by Takeshi Obata, Platinum End was serialized in Shueisha's monthly shōnen manga magazine Jump Square from November 4, 2015, to January 4, 2021. The series' 58 individual chapters were collected into fourteen tankōbon volumes, released from February 4, 2016, to February 4, 2021.

On October 5, 2015, Viz Media announced that they had licensed Platinum End for an English release in North America. In March 2016, Viz confirmed that they would start releasing print editions of Platinum End, with the first volume released in October 2016. The manga is licensed by Kazé in France.

==== Volumes ====
No.	Original release date	Original ISBN	English release date	English ISBN
1	February 4, 2016	978-4-08-880637-2	October 4, 2016	978-1-4215-9063-9
1. "Gift from an Angel" (天使の贈り物, Tenshi no Okurimono); 2. "Man's Nature" (男の性, Otoko no Sei); 3. "Hero of Justice" (正義のヒーロー, Seigi no Hīrō)
2	May 2, 2016	978-4-08-880709-6	March 7, 2017	978-1-4215-9207-7
4. "Heart's Beloved" (憧れの人, Akogare no Hito); 5. "The Big Reveal" (発表の瞬間, Happyō no Shunkan); 6. "A Secret Chat" (内緒の話, Naisho no Hanashi)
3	August 4, 2016	978-4-08-880760-7	August 1, 2017	978-1-4215-9208-4
7. "Death Sentence" (死の宣告, Shi no Senkoku); 8. "Two Painful Options" (苦渋の二択, Kujū no Nitaku); 9. "Tower of Nightmares" (悪夢のタワー, Akumu no Tawā)
4	November 4, 2016	978-4-08-880814-7	December 5, 2017	978-1-4215-9582-5
10. "Product of Coincidence" (偶然の産物, Gūzen no Sanbutsu); 11. "A Girl's Heart" (乙女の心, Otome no Kokoro); 12. "Symbol of Promise" (約束のしるし, Yakusoku no Shirushi)
5	February 3, 2017	978-4-08-881009-6	April 3, 2018	978-1-4215-9702-7
13. "Face of Determination" (決意の表情, Ketsui no Kao); 14. "Man in the Mirror" (鏡の姿, Kagami no Sugata); 15. "The Doorway Lure" (誘導の扉, Yūdō no Tobira)
6	June 2, 2017	978-4-08-881080-5	August 7, 2018	978-1-4215-9945-8
16. "Where the Tears Go" (涙の行方, Namida no Yukue); 17. "The Throbbing of the Heart" (胸のどきめき, Mune no Dokimeki); 18. "Your Own Worth" (己の価値, Onore no Kachi); 19. "The Glass Vessel" (硝子の器, Garasu no Utsuwa)
7	November 2, 2017	978-4-08-881161-1	December 4, 2018	978-1-9747-0143-8
20. "A Fine Line Between Offense and Defense" (紙一重の攻防, Kamihitoe no Kōbō); 21. "Their Choices" (二人の選択, Futari no Sentaku); 22. "Eternal Beauty" (永遠の美, Eien no Bi); 23. "World Peace" (世界の平和, Sekai no Heiwa)
8	April 4, 2018	978-4-08-881370-7	April 2, 2019	978-1-9747-0396-8
24. "Absolute Confidence" (絶対の自信, Zettai no Jishin); 25. "One Life" (一つの命, Hitotsu no Inochi); 26. "Two Lights" (二つの光, Futatsu no Hikari); 27. "At the Same Table" (一緒の食卓(テーブル), Isshō no Tēburu)
9	September 4, 2018	978-4-08-881426-1	July 2, 2019	978-1-9747-0771-3
28. "Midair Confession" (宙空の告白, Chūkū no Kokuhaku); 29. "Diffused Power" (拡散の力, Kakusan no Chikara); 30. "World's Greatest Assassin" (最高の暗殺者, Saikō no Ansatsusha); 31. "Updated List" (更新のリスト, Kōshin no Risuto)
10	February 4, 2019	978-4-08-881729-3	December 3, 2019	978-1-9747-1054-6
32. "A Boy's Hope" (少年の希望, Shōnen no Kibō); 33. "The Other Five" (他の5人, Hoka no Go-nin); 34. "False Appearance" (偽りの姿, Itsuwari no Sugata); 35. "The Power of Numbers" (数の論理, Sū no Ronri); 36. "Last Supper" (最後の晩餐, Saigo no Bansan)
11	July 4, 2019	978-4-08-881887-0	April 7, 2020	978-1-9747-1256-4
37. "Conditions for Contact" (接触の条件, Sesshoku no Jōken); 38. "Youthful Speeches" (青年の主張, Seinen no Shuchō); 39. "The Future of Humanity" (人間の未来, Ningen no Mirai); 40. "In the Crosshairs" (照準の先, Shōjun no Saki); 41. "Society's Response" (世間の反応, Seken no Hannō)
12	February 4, 2020	978-4-08-882190-0	January 5, 2021	978-1-9747-1974-7
42. "Root of Disaster" (災いの元, Wazawai no Moto); 43. "The Price of Honor" (名誉の代償, Meiyo no Daishō); 44. "Stars in the Night Sky" (夜空の星, Yozora no Hoshi); 45. "Measure of Sentiment" (思いの丈, Omoi no Take); 46. "Day of Reunion" (再開の日, Saikai no Hi); 47. "The Time for Talk" (対話の時間, Taiwa no Jikan)
13	September 4, 2020	978-4-08-882392-8	July 6, 2021	978-1-9747-2291-4
48. "The Fault of Science" (災いの元, Wazawai no Moto); 49. "The Scale of Sacrifice" (犠牲の規模, Gisei no Kibo); 50. "For Yourself" (自分の為, Jibun no Tame); 51. "Choose a Life" (命の選択, Inochi no Sentaku); 52. "Wings of Determination" (決意の翼, Ketsui no Tsubasa); 53. "Hand of Salvation" (救いの手, Sukui no Te)
14	February 4, 2021	978-4-08-882555-7	March 1, 2022	978-1-9747-2650-9
54. "At the End of Thought" (思考の果て, Shikō no Hate); 55. "Birth of a God" (神の誕生, Kami no Tanjō); 56. "Master of Creation" (創造の主, Sōzō no Nushi); 57. "Each One's Happiness" (それぞれの幸せ, Sorezore no Shiawase); 58. "The Final Arrow" (最期の矢, Saigo no Ya)

=== Anime ===
On December 2, 2020, Pony Canyon registered the "Anime-PlatinumEnd.com" domain name, and on December 19, 2020, at the Jump Festa '21 online event, it was announced that the manga would receive an anime television series adaptation by Signal.MD. Hideya Takahashi directed the "first series", while Kazuchika Kise directed the second, with series composition by Shin'ichi Inozume, and character designs by Kōji Ōdate. Masahiro Tokuda composed the anime's music. The show ran for 24 episodes, and aired on TBS, BS11, and other channels from October 8, 2021, to March 25, 2022. (Note: TBS lists the airing of the series on Thursday at 25:28, which is effectively Friday at 1:28 a.m. JST.) Band-Maid performed the opening theme song "Sense", while Yuu Miyashita performed the first ending theme "Kōfuku-Ron" (降伏論; 'Theory of Surrender'). Kuhaku Gokko performed the second ending theme "Last Straw" (ラストストロウ). Both Crunchyroll and Funimation streamed the series outside of Asia. On October 28, 2021, Crunchyroll announced the anime would receive an English dub, which premiered on November 18 of the same year. Medialink licensed the series in South and Southeast Asia. Disney+ Hotstar started streaming the series weekly in select Southeast Asian regions from January 5, 2022.

The Platinum End anime series was released in Japan on DVD and Blu-ray across four volumes, each containing six episodes. The first volume was released on January 19, 2022; and each volume was released bi-monthly until July 20 of the same year. In North America, Crunchyroll released the first 12 episodes of the series on Blu-Ray on January 10, 2023, followed by a second Blu-ray release on June 6 of the same year, that contained the second half of the series. Crunchyroll also released the anime in two parts in the United Kingdom and Australia.

== Reception ==
The first volume of Platinum End debuted at number two on Oricon's weekly list of the best-selling manga, with 105,213 copies sold. In December 2020, the manga had 4.5 million copies in circulation. When reviewing the opening chapter, Ian Wolf of Anime UK News compared Platinum End to Ohba and Obata's earlier series Death Note, saying: "the central character is a teenage boy fed up with life, who is guided by a supernatural force and given great power. Both leads seemingly find themselves on the path to becoming a deity. However, while Light Yagami uses his powers for diabolic ends, killing anyone he suspects of doing anything wrong while being observed by a shinigami, Mirai Kakehashi is guided by an apparently more benevolent force." He also called the series an example of a death game. Writing about the first chapter for The Fandom Post, Jarius Taylor gave Platinum End a B+ rating and compared it to Future Diary writing: "while I don't have too much doubt it'll be stronger overall, the overt edginess here isn't something I was quite expecting from Ohba. Still, it's a pretty interesting read from beginning to end, and there's a lot of potential in terms of both thriller aspects and the overall theme. Hopefully, it'll be able to differentiate itself from Future Diary more going forward, but for now the idea of Ohba and Obata taking a crack at their own version of it seems pretty good to me".

Nick Creamer of Anime News Network also compared the manga to Death Note and described the series as a battle royale that mixes "rule-based thriller shenanigans and misanthropic theology". He praised Obata's art for combining "wondrously complex" background details and almost off-puttingly precise character designs "to arrive at something as cold as it is striking". Although he also praised Ohba for his pacing of action and twists and for constructing conflicts that truly make the characters seem smart and worth following, Creamer called his character and thematic writing "abysmal", as he found most of the characters to be either one-note villains or sycophants. Creamer stated that the third volume of Platinum End improved the manga from an interesting series, into a genuinely strong one. While still finding the story's philosophical pretensions to be "muddy", he praised the volume's focus on thrilling dramatic setpieces and its emphasis on new hero Mukaido. In contrast, AIPT Comics's Eric Alex Cline found volume seven to be "wonderfully political", with topics such as classism, charity, and the human right to happiness all addressed effectively and enhancing the series' sense of substance. He noted the classist elements of Kanade's views to be especially well-handled, as Ohba and Obata explore "toxic societal associations between poverty and the concept of people being metaphorically unclean."

Reviewing Platinum End for The Outerhaven, Josh Piedra called Metropoliman a great antagonist because he truly is a "disgusting" character with a god complex. He praised volume nine of the series for quickly establishing the new direction that the story is heading, with a new cast of characters, new plots and new threats. Piedra felt that Ohba's bringing of religion and philosophy into the story in volume eleven was both shocking and well-executed, while noting it to be a "bold move" that could rub some readers the wrong way. He stated that the ending to the series surpassed every expectation he had, and suggested that its epilogue could be the most-shocking event in any manga. Delving into "the philosophy of life itself and its existence, it gives a magnitude of reflection so great, that it raises questions about our own reality and our own lives." Commenting on the series as a whole, Piedra called Platinum End enjoyable, but not without its flaws. He described it as having every semblance of Ohba and Obata's trademarks; deep, meaningful dialogue, multi-layered stories, and two major arcs that are different, yet, similar to each other. However, like their other two series, he found it dragged in some parts. Piedra ranked Platinum End second among the duo's three works; ahead of Death Note, but behind Bakuman.
