= Different (Band-Maid song) =

Single by Band-Maid
- B-side: "Don't Be Long"
- Released: December 2, 2020
- Length: 8:22
- Label: Nippon Crown
- Songwriters: Miku Kobato; Band-Maid
- Producer: Band-Maid

Band-Maid singles chronology
"Bubble" (2019)	"Different" (2020)	"Sense" (2021)

Music video
- Band-Maid "Different" on YouTube

"Different" is the seventh single by Japanese rock band Band-Maid, released in Japan on December 2, 2020, by Nippon Crown. The song was used as the opening theme song for the third season of the anime Log Horizon.

== Composition ==
The lyrics for "Different" are about Log Horizon.

== Critical reception ==
Anime News Network said of the title track "This song just doesn't QUIT. The drums and the bass are insane from start to finish." Raijin Rock called the title track "the greatest single of the year." JaME wrote that the single shows that the band "are still doing great creating both skillful music and explosive tracks" and stated that "Don't Be Long" "is so catchy that you will definitely want to experience it again and again."

== Music video ==
The music video for "Different" was released on December 1, 2020.

== Live performances ==
A live version of "Different" was later released on their video album: Band-Maid Online Okyu-Ji (Feb. 11, 2021). "Don't Be Long" was played live over a year prior to the release of the single.

== Track listing ==
CD

All music is composed by Band-Maid.

No.	Title	Lyrics	Length
1.	"Different"	Miku Kobato	3:33
2.	"Don't Be Long"	Instrumental	3:19
3.	"Different" (89Sec Version)	Kobato	1:30

== Credits and personnel ==
Band-Maid members

- Misa – bass
- Miku Kobato – vocals, guitar
- Saiki Atsumi – vocals
- Akane Hirose – drums
- Kanami Tōno – guitar

Recording and management

- Recorded at Nasoundra Palace Studio
- Recording engineer: Masyoshi Yamamoto
- Mixed at Mix Forest
- Mix engineer: Masahiko Fukui
- Mastered by Masahiko Fukui
- Design by Kyoko Ando

== Charts ==
Chart (2020)	Peak position
Japan (Oricon)	19
Japan Top Singles Sales (Billboard)	17

== Release history ==
Region	Date	Format	Label
Japan	December 2, 2020	CD; digital download	Nippon Crown
Worldwide	December 2, 2020	Digital download	Nippon Crown
