= Unseen World =

Studio album by Band-Maid
- Released: January 13, 2021
- Recorded: 2020
- Genre: Hard rock
- Language: Japanese
- Label: Pony Canyon
- Producer: Band-Maid; Tienowa

Band-Maid chronology
| Conqueror (2019) | Unseen World (2021) | Unleash (2022) |

Music videos
- "Warning!" on YouTube
- "After Life" on YouTube
- "Manners" on YouTube

Unseen World is the seventh studio album by the Japanese all-female rock band Band-Maid. It was released digitally on January 13, 2021, with physical formats released one week later. It is the band's first album for Pony Canyon.

The cover is a collage of the band members' fingers. The album reached the top 20 on the rock music charts in thirteen countries, and reached no. 1 on the Oricon Rock Albums chart in Japan.

== Composition and lyrics ==
The lyrics for "After Life" are about the future and being born again. Bassist Misa wrote the guitar solo for "No God". The lyrics for "Manners" are about Band-Maid. Rhythm guitarist/vocalist Miku Kobato wanted to call it "Rule", but lead vocalist Saiki Atsumi felt that it was too pushy. It was the last song written for the album. Lead guitarist Kanami Tōno wanted "Manners" to have a Western feel to it, so she analyzed all the songs that were nominated for Grammy Awards.

The working title for "I Still Seek Revenge." was "Revenge". The title of "H-G-K" is a reference to a Turkish military guided bomb, HGK, as has been confirmed by lyricist Kobato in an interview. It took Tōno two to three months to be able to play it. For this song, Tōno was asked to make a song in the style of "Choose Me", but it didn’t turn out that way. She tried again with "After Life", but that ended up being different as well.

"Nightingale" was written by Tōno as a request by Kobato, who wanted a solo song on the album, because she didn’t have one on their previous album, Conqueror. It was originally supposed to have a simpler ending. The title and the English spoken words (Note: My bounty is as boundless as the sea... My love as deep... The more I give to thee... The more I have, for both are infinite.) are from William Shakespeare's Romeo and Juliet.

"Chemical Reaction" was based on a riff Misa wrote. The demo Tōno sent drummer Akane Hirose featured a cowbell, which Hirose wanted to replace with a ride cymbal cup, but Tōno said to keep the cowbell. The lyrics for "Giovanni" are based on Kenji Miyazawa’s novel Night on the Galactic Railroad.

"Ambition" is a love song. Kobato left it up to interpretation on whether it is about infidelity or unrequited love. "Black Hole" is their fastest song, with a BPM of 220. Hirose prepared seven different patterns of kick drum variations to show to her band members, with the level of difficulty ranging from "easy-peasy" to "hell". They all chose "hell", without listening to any of the others.

== Critical reception ==
The album received generally positive reviews from music journalists familiar with the J-rock scene. Carlos Vélez-Cancel at Everything Is Noise noted that the album is heavier than its predecessors, and praised the band's "ability to craft anthemic songs without being afraid to delve into the unconventional." Raijin Rock also noted the album's lack of ballads when compared to the band's previous albums and its "absolutely furious and unabating assault of aggressive hard rock", along with guitarist Kanami Tōno's ability to write memorable riffs, concluding that the band "are more cohesive on Unseen World than in any previous release." JaME called it "a vivid, powerful album that can easily be called Band-Maid’s best work to date." The album also received a positive review from Exclaim! which described the album's music as more adventurous and displaying more character than albums by other current J-Rock bands.

Koichi Inoue of Gekirock listed the album as the tenth best album of 2021 and listed "Nightingale" as the second best song of the year.

=== Accolades ===
| Publication | Accolade | Rank |
|---|---|---|
| 4ZZZ | Garry Williams top ten albums of 2021 | 9 |
| MetalSucks | Ryan Dyer's Best Metal Albums of 2021...So Far | — |
| Raijin Rock | Album of the Year | 1 |
| Rice Digital | Album of the Year | 1 |
| Tricky-Kid.com | Best Metal Albums | 5 |
| Wall of Sound | Simon Valentine's Top 5 Albums of 2021 | 1 |

== Track listing ==
All lyrics written by Miku Kobato, all music written by Band-Maid.

CD (Normal Edition)
| No. | Title | Length |
|---|---|---|
| 1. | "Warning!" | 4:20 |
| 2. | "No God" | 4:10 |
| 3. | "After Life" | 3:23 |
| 4. | "Manners" | 3:50 |
| 5. | "I Still Seek Revenge." | 3:02 |
| 6. | "H-G-K" | 3:07 |
| 7. | "Nightingale (Sayonakidori, サヨナキドリ)" | 4:33 |
| 8. | "Why Why Why" | 3:37 |
| 9. | "Chemical Reaction" | 4:09 |
| 10. | "Giovanni" | 4:17 |
| 11. | "Ambition (Honkai, 本懐)" | 3:16 |
| 12. | "Black Hole" | 3:05 |
| 13. | "Without Holding Back" | 3:33 |
| Total length: | | 48:33 |

CD (First Press Limited Edition)
| No. | Title | Length |
|---|---|---|
| 1. | "Warning!" | 4:20 |
| 2. | "No God" | 4:10 |
| 3. | "After Life" | 3:23 |
| 4. | "Manners" | 3:50 |
| 5. | "I Still Seek Revenge." | 3:02 |
| 6. | "H-G-K" | 3:07 |
| 7. | "Nightingale (Sayonakidori, サヨナキドリ)" | 4:33 |
| 8. | "Why Why Why" | 3:37 |
| 9. | "Chemical Reaction" | 4:09 |
| 10. | "Giovanni" | 4:17 |
| 11. | "Ambition (Honkai, 本懐)" | 3:16 |
| 12. | "Black Hole" | 3:05 |
| Total length: | | 45:00 |

=== Limited Edition ===
Disc 1 (Roots, 原点回帰盤)
| No. | Title | Length |
|---|---|---|
| 1. | "After Life" | 3:23 |
| 2. | "Why Why Why" | 3:37 |
| 3. | "Youth" | 3:41 |
| 4. | "Nightingale (Sayonakidori, サヨナキドリ)" | 4:33 |
| 5. | "Chemical Reaction" | 4:09 |
| 6. | "Manners" | 3:50 |
| 7. | "I Still Seek Revenge." | 3:02 |
| Total length: | | 26:18 |

Disc 2 (Progress, 現点進化盤）
| No. | Title | Length |
|---|---|---|
| 1. | "Giovanni" | 4:17 |
| 2. | "H-G-K" | 3:07 |
| 3. | "Manners" | 3:50 |
| 4. | "Black Hole" | 3:05 |
| 5. | "Ambition (Honkai, 本懐)" | 3:16 |
| 6. | "No God" | 4:10 |
| 7. | "Warning!" | 4:20 |
| Total length: | | 26:08 |

=== DVD/Blu-ray (First Press Limited Edition) ===
| No. | Title | Length |
|---|---|---|
| 1. | "After Life" (Instrumental video) |
| 2. | "No God" (Instrumental video) |
| 3. | "Giovanni" (Instrumental video) |
| 4. | "Without Holding Back" (Instrumental video) |

== Personnel ==
Band-Maid

- Saiki Atsumi – lead vocals (except track 7)
- Miku Kobato – rhythm guitar, vocals, lead vocals on track 7
- Kanami Tōno – lead guitar
- Misa – bass
- Akane Hirose – drums

== Charts ==
| Chart (2021) | Peak position |
|---|---|
| Japan Hot Albums (Billboard) | 6 |
| Japanese Albums (Oricon) | 8 |
| Japanese Rock Albums (Oricon) | 1 |
