= The Warning discography =

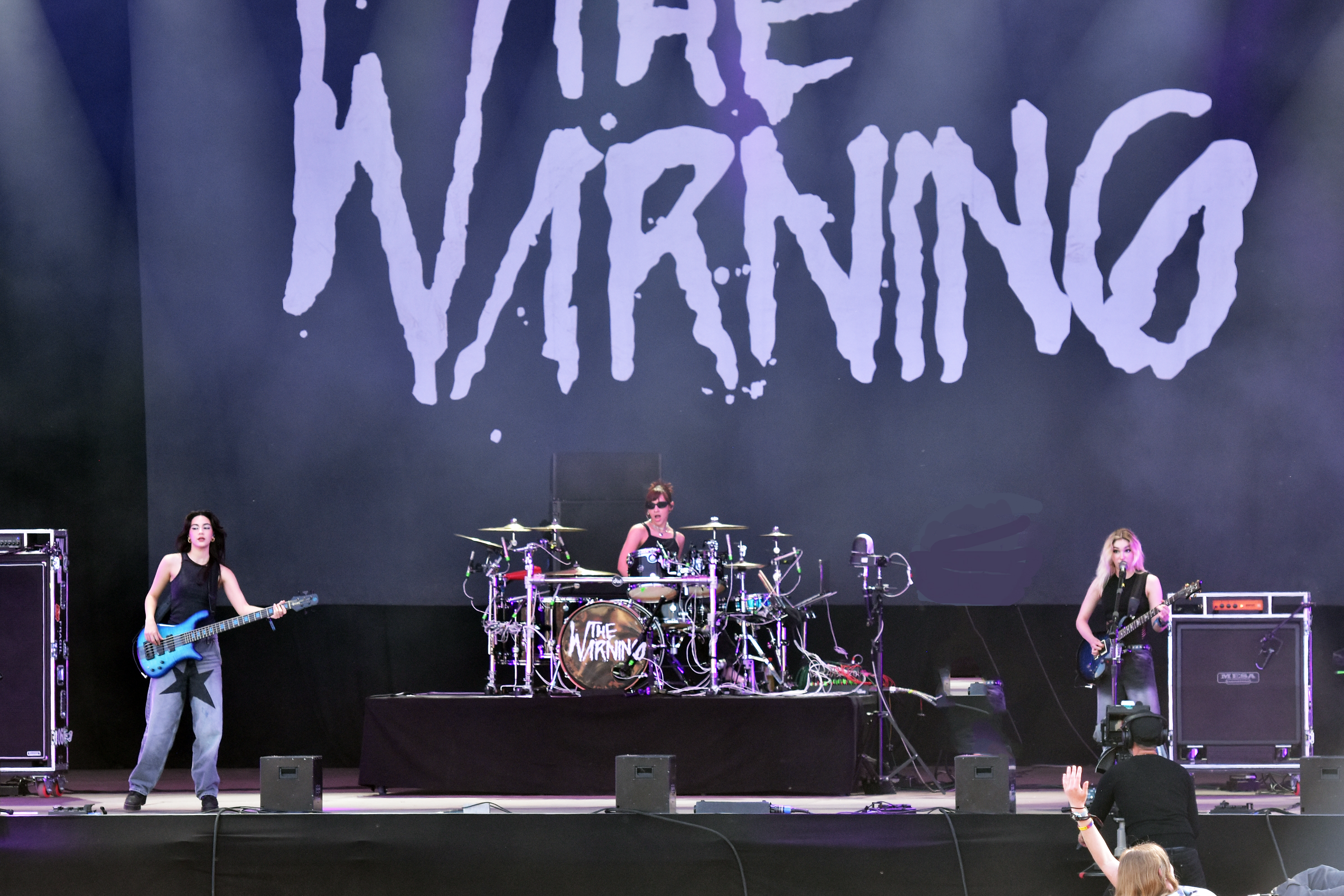
- The Warning performing at Wacken Open Air in Wacken, Schleswig-Holstein in 2024
- Studio albums: 5
- EPs: 2
- Live albums: 1
- Singles: 21
- Music videos: 20
- Concert films: 1

Mexican rock band The Warning has released five studio albums, two extended plays, one live album, and nineteen singles.

== Albums ==
=== Studio albums ===
List of studio albums, with selected details
Title	Album details	Peak chart positions									
Title	Album details	AUS	AUT	BEL (FL)	BEL (WA)	GER	SPA	SWI	UK	UK Rock	US
XXI Century Blood	Released: 27 March 2017; Label: Independent; Formats: CD, LP, digital download, streaming	—	—	—	—	—	—	—	—	—	—
Queen of the Murder Scene	Released: 25 November 2018; Label: Independent; Formats: CD, LP, digital download, streaming	—	—	—	—	—	—	—	—	—	
Error	Released: 24 June 2022; Label: Lava, Republic; Formats: CD, LP, digital download, streaming	—	—	—	—	—	—	—	8	—	
Keep Me Fed	Released: 28 June 2024; Label: Lava, Republic; Formats: CD, LP, digital download, streaming	—	39	122	192	19	79	14	—	1	59
Everything's Falling	Released: 28 August 2026; Label: Lava, Republic; Formats: CD, LP, digital download, streaming	82	9	9	6	2	28	5	16	1	17
"—" denotes a recording that did not chart in that territory.

=== Live albums ===
List of live album, with selected details
Title	Album details	Peak chart positions			
Title	Album details	BEL (WA)	FRA Rock	GER	SWI
Live from Auditorio Nacional, CDMX	Released: 22 August 2025; Label: Lava, Republic; Formats: CD, LP, digital download, streaming	112	37	78	68

== Concert films ==
- Live from Auditorio Nacional, CDMX (2025)

== Extended plays ==
- Escape the Mind (2015)
- Mayday (2021)

== Singles ==
Title	Year	Peak chart positions										Album
Title	Year	BOL Air.	CAN Rock	CIS Air.	LAT Air.	LTU Air.	MDA Air.	RUS Air.	US Hard Rock	US Hard Rock Dig.	US Main. Rock	Album
"Free Falling"	2015	—	—	—	*		*	—	—	—	—	Escape the Mind
"Narcisista"	2019	—	—	—	—	—	*	—	—	—	—	Non-album single
"Choke"	2021	—	—	—	—	—	*	—	—	—	—	Error
"Evolve"	2021	—	—	—	—	—	*	—	—	—	—	Error
"Enter Sandman" (with Alessia Cara)	2021	—	—	—	—	—	*	—	13	11	—	The Metallica Blacklist
"Martirio"	2021	—	—	—	—	—	*	—	—	—	—	Error
"Disciple"	2021	—	—	—	—	—	*	—	—	—	—	Error
"Money"	2022	—	23	—	—	—	*	—	—	—	31	Error
"Choke" (featuring Grandson and Zero 9:36)	2022	—	—	—	—	—	*	—	—	—	—	Non-album single
"More"	2023	—	25	—	—	—	—	—	—	8	36	Keep Me Fed
"Sick"	2024	—	20	—	—	—	—	—	—	5	8	Keep Me Fed
"Hell You Call a Dream" / "Qué Más Quieres"	2024	—	—	—	—	—	—	—	—	—	32	Keep Me Fed
"Hell You Call a Dream" / "Qué Más Quieres"	2024	—	—	—	—	—	—	—	—	—	—	Keep Me Fed
"Automatic Sun"	2024	—	—	—	—	—	—	—	—	—	—	Keep Me Fed
"Burnout"	2024	—	—	—	—	—	—	—	—	—	—	Keep Me Fed
"Six Feet Deep"	2024	—	—	—	—	—	—	—	—	—	—	Keep Me Fed
"Show Them" (with Band-Maid)	2024	—	—	—	—	—	—	—	—	—	—	Epic Narratives
"Hurt" (with Dead Poet Society)	2024	—	—	—	—	—	—	—	15	—	8	Fission
"Qué Más Quieres" / "Sharks" / "Automatic Sun"	2025	—	—	—	—	—	—	—	—	—	—	Live from Auditorio Nacional, CDMX
"Let Me Burn" (with Maggie Lindemann)	2025	—	—	—	—	—	—	—	—	—	—	I Feel Everything
"Love to Be Loved" (with Carín León)	2026	10	—	—	—	—	—	—	—	—	—	Non-album single
"Kerosene"	2026	— (Note: "Kerosene" did not enter the Bolivia General Airplay Chart, but peaked at number 8 on the Bolivia Anglo Airplay Chart.)	—	—	—	—	—	—	2	2	1	Everything's Falling
"Tu Corazón (Your Heart)" (with Pnau)	2026	—	—	14	1	51	60	12	—	×	—	Ahhcade
"Ego"	2026	—	—	—	—	—	—	—	—	×	—	Everything's Falling
"Ritual"	2026	—	—	—	—	—	—	—	—	×	—	Everything's Falling
"Bite My Tongue"	2026	—	—	—	—	—	—	—	—	×	31	Everything's Falling
"—" denotes items which were not released in that country or failed to chart. "*" denotes that the chart did not exist at that time.

== Music videos ==
Song	Year	Director	Cinematographer	Link
"XXI Century Blood"	2017	Abraham Marcos	Francisco Alanís	
"Choke"	2021	Gabo Ramos	Unknown	
"Evolve"	2021	Rudy Joffroy	Raziel Zúñiga	
"Enter Sandman" (with Alessia Cara)	2021	Rudy Joffroy	Alan Zúñiga	
"Martirio"	2021	Oliver Castro	Alan Zúñiga	
"Disciple"	2021	Gabo Ramos	Alan Zúñiga	
"Animosity"	2021	Maurice Vargas	Unknown	
"Money"	2022	Iván Chávez and Rudy Joffroy	Unknown	
"Error"	2022	Alexa Cha and CJ Nicadao	Unknown	
"Choke" (featuring Grandson and Zero 9:36)	2022	Iván Chávez	Unknown	
"More"	2023	Iván Chávez	Unknown	
"Sick"	2024	Iván Chávez	Unknown	
"Hell You Call a Dream" (live video)	2024	Iván Chávez	Unknown	
"Automatic Sun"	2024	AJ Gómez and Iván Chávez	Unknown	
"¿Qué Mas Quieres?"	2024	Paulina Villarreal and Iván Chávez	Alan Zúñiga	
"Burnout"	2024	Rudy Joffroy and Iván Chávez	Iván Chávez	
"Six Feet Deep"	2024	AJ Gómez	Juansa Ávalos	
"Show Them" (with Band-Maid)	2024	Ryōji Aoki	Unknown	
"Hurt" (with Dead Poet Society)	2025	Edward Curren	Unknown	
"Love to Be Loved" (with Carín León)	2026	AJ Gómez	Juansa Ávalos	
"Kerosene"	2026	Iván Chávez	Juansa Ávalos	
"Kerosene" (performance video)	2026	Iván Chávez	Juansa Ávalos	
"Ego"	2026	Iván Chávez	Santiago Anza	
"Ritual"	2026	Knifee and Roses (Kathya Velazquez)	Junior González	
"Ritual" (performance video)	2026	Knifee and Roses	Junior González	
"Bite My Tongue"	2026	Rudy Joffroy and AJ Gómez	Unknown	

== Other appearances ==
Song	Year	Album	Comments
"El Baile de los que Sobran"	2026	Dear Killer Nannies (soundtrack from Dear Killer Nannies)	Cover of a 1986 Los Prisioneros song.
