= Ahhcade =

Studio album by Pnau
- Released: 31 July 2026
- Length: 30:04
- Label: Etcetc
- Producers: Boys Noize; Dom Dias; Fat Max Gsus; Cesar Funck; Kungs; Meduza; Franz Novotny; Pnau; SadMonth

Pnau chronology
Hyperbolic (2024)	Ahhcade (2026)

Singles from Ahhcade
- 1. "Rollin" Released: 20 February 2026; 2. "Tu Corazón (Your Heart)" Released: 10 April 2026; 3. "Nirvana" Released: 8 May 2026; 4. "Crash" Released: 29 May 2026; 5. "Chemistry" Released: 3 July 2026; 6. "Serotonin" Released: 31 July 2026

Singles from Ahhcade (Deluxe)
- 1. "Change" Released: 9 October 2026

Ahhcade (stylised as AHHCade) is the seventh studio album by the Australian electronic music duo Pnau. Announced on May 2026, it was released on 31 July 2026 through Etcetc Music. A follow-up to their previous album, Hyperbolic (2024), Ahhcade was supported by the release of the singles "Rollin'", "Tu Corazón (Your Heart)", "Nirvana", "Crash" and "Chemistry". The album also features the previously released collab single with Kungs, "Light Me Up". Guest appearances on the album includes EarthGang, SadMonth, Master Peace, Kurtis Wells, The Warning, The Flints, Maleigh Zan, Marieme and Meduza.

About Ahhcade, Nick Littlemore explained: "We are making heart songs. While, yes, they have electronics and they have technology, they are essentially expressions of the heart."

A Deluxe version is scheduled for release on 4 December 2026, featuring two new tracks.

== Track listing ==
Ahhcade track listing
No.	Title	Writer(s)	Producer(s)	Length
1.	"Nirvana" (with EarthGang and SadMonth)	Nick Littlemore; Peter Mayes; Dominque Dias; Olu Onyemachi Dakarai Fann; Stephen Kozmeniuk; Eian Undrai Parker	Pnau; SadMonth	2:58
2.	"Chemistry" (featuring Master Peace)	N. Littlemore; Mayes; Holger Czukay; Max Grahn; Michael Karoli; Jaki Liebezeit; Jens Lissat; Irmin Schmidt; Damo Suzuki; Ramon Zenker	Pnau; Fat Max Gsus	3:29
3.	"Serotonin" (featuring Kurtis Wells)	N. Littlemore; Mayes; Dias; Kurtis Wells	Pnau; Dom Dias	2:06
4.	"Tu Corazón (Your Heart)" (featuring The Warning)	N. Littlemore; Sam Littlemore; Mayes; Alejandra Villarreal Vélez; Daniela Villarreal Vélez; Paulina Villarreal Vélez	Pnau	2:57
5.	"Undone" (featuring the Flints)	N. Littlemore; Mayes; George Flint; Henry Flint	Pnau	2:11
6.	"Crash" (with Maleigh Zan)	N. Littlemore; Mayes; Javaan Anderson; Dias; Dylan Ismael Teixeira; Maleigh Zan	Pnau; Dias	2:16
7.	"Light Me Up" (with Kungs)	N. Littlemore; Mayes; Valentin Brunel; Cesar Funck; Alex Ridha	Boys Noize; Funck; Kungs; Franz Novotny	2:41
8.	"Heart Beats" (featuring Marieme)	N. Littlemore; Mayes; Marieme Diop	Pnau	3:42
9.	"Eternal" (featuring Marieme)	N. Littlemore; Mayes; Diop; Nicholas Routledge	Pnau	3:10
10.	"Rockette"	N. Littlemore; Mayes; Dias; John Lathrop Mitchell; Matthias Spruch	Pnau; Dias	2:29
11.	"Rollin'" (with Meduza)	N. Littlemore; Mayes; Dan Caplen; Luca de Gregorio; Dylan; Simone Giani; Mattia Vitale	Pnau; Meduza	2:05
Total length:				30:04

Ahhcade (Deluxe) track listing
No.	Title	Writer(s)	Producer(s)	Length
2.	"Change"	N. Littlemore; Mayes; Ryland Blackinton; Adio Marchant	Pnau	2:17

Notes

- "Crash" features additional vocals performed by Nami
- "Rockette" contains an uncredited feature guest appearance from Jonny Yukon

== Personnel ==
Credits are adapted from Tidal.

=== Pnau ===
- Nick Littlemore – performance, vocals on "Light Me Up"
- Peter Mayes – performance, vocals on "Light Me Up"

=== Additional contributors ===
- Kevin Grainger – mastering, mixing on all tracks except "Light Me Up"
- Master Peace – vocals on "Chemistry"
- Kurtis Wells – vocals on "Serotonin"
- The Warning – vocals on "Tu Corazón (Your Heart)"
- The Flints – vocals on "Undone"
- Maleigh Zan – vocals on "Crash"
- Nami – vocals on "Crash"
- Franz Novotny – vocals on "Light Me Up"
- A. Ridha – mixing on "Light Me Up"
- Marieme – vocals on "Heart Beats" and "Eternal"
- Johnny Yukon – vocals on "Rockette"

== Charts ==
Chart performance for Ahhcade
Chart (2026)	Peak position
Australian Albums (ARIA)	33
