= Kevin Hissink =

Dutch songwriter and producer

- Genres: Pop, alternative rock, rock, EDM, R&B
- Occupations: Music producer, songwriter, remixer
- Instrument: Guitar

Kevin Hissink, also known as Boonn, is a Dutch songwriter and record producer, based in Los Angeles, California.

== Career ==
Hissink has written and produced songs for a number of artists including grandson, Nicki Minaj, Rihanna, Demi Lovato, Chris Brown, Mike Shinoda, Tom Morello, Oliver Tree, Jessie Reyez, Blue Stones, Zero 9:36, and Pop Evil.

He co-wrote and co-produced several pop songs such as "Fly" by Nicki Minaj (ft. Rihanna). "Fly" went to number 19 on the Billboard Hot 100 and reached platinum status. In 2017, He co-wrote and co-produced the song "Cry Baby" for Demi Lovato, whose album received platinum status. In 2022, he co-wrote and co-produced "Nobody Has To Know" by Chris Brown ft Davido. The song was featured on Brown's Deluxe Album: Breezy which was nominated for a Grammy award in the category best album R&B.

Hissink became the main collaborator for Fueled by Ramen's artist grandson. He co-wrote and co-produced all songs on the EP A Modern Tragedy Vol. 1, including the single "Blood // Water". "Blood // Water" went multiplatinum in Canada and the USA. "Blood // Water" has gotten various sync and licensing placements, including gaming platforms such as Call of Duty. In 2019, "Blood // Water was awarded with a SOCAN award.

Hissink co-wrote and co-produced Yonaka's remix "F.W.T.B." for the movie Fast and Furious presents: Hobbs & Shaw. He co-wrote and co-produced all songs on A Modern Tragedy Vol. 2 and 3, including ''Oh No!!!', which was featured in 2021's The Suicide Squad 2. In 2020, under the name Boonn, he co-wrote and co-produced grandson's album Death Of An Optimist, that included the single "Dirty". "Dirty" went gold in Canada. "Drop Dead" ft. Kesha was co-produced with Travis Barker, and "Riptide" was co-produced with Mike Shinoda. "Rain" by grandson ft. Jessie Reyez, was written for and featured in The Suicide Squad 2. He also co-wrote and co-produced remixes for various artist such as Oliver Tree, Dillon Frances, and KennyHoopla. As well as singles for various artists, such as the Blue Stones and Alice Longyu Gao.

He co-wrote and produced "Hold The Line" by Tom Morello ft. grandson. In 2023, "Hold the line" was nominated for a Social Change Special Merit Award at the 65th Grammy Awards.

In 2023, Hissink co-produced and co-wrote the majority on grandson's album I Love You, I'm Trying.

== Discography ==
Artist	Year	Album	Song	Credit
Nicki Minaj ft. Rihanna	2011	Pink Friday	"Fly"	co-writer/producer
David Guetta ft. Usher	2011	-	"Without you"	guitarist
Gers Pardoel	2011	Spookstad	"Ik neem je mee"	guistarist
Jason Derulo	2011	Future History	"Pick up the Pieces"	guistarist
Michael Jackson	2014	Xscape	"Love Never Felt So Good"	guitarist
grandson	2018	Modern Tragedy Vol. 1	"Blood // Water"	co-writer/producer
grandson	2018	Modern Tragedy Vol. 1	"Stick up"	co-writer/producer
grandson	2018	Modern Tragedy Vol. 1	"Despicable"	co-writer/producer
grandson	2018	Modern Tragedy Vol. 1	"6:00"	co-writer/producer
grandson	2018	Modern Tragedy Vol. 1	"Overdose"	co-writer/producer
grandson	2018	-	"War"	co-writer/producer
Demi Lovato	2018	Tell Me You Love Me	"Cry Baby"	co-writer/producer
Yonaka	2018	Fast & Furious Presents: Hobbs & Shaw Soundtrack	"F.W.T.B." Remix	co-writer/producer (remix)
grandson	2019	Modern Tragedy Vol. 2	"Apologize"	co-writer/producer
grandson	2019	Modern Tragedy Vol. 2	"Stigmata"	co-writer/producer
grandson	2019	Modern Tragedy Vol. 2	"Is This What You Wanted"	co-writer/producer
grandson	2019	Modern Tragedy Vol. 2	"Fallin (Temptation)"	co-writer/producer
grandson	2019	Modern Tragedy Vol. 2	"Darkside"	co-writer/producer
Mike Shinoda	2019	Post Traumatic	"Running From My Shadow"	co-writer/producer
grandson	2019	Modern Tragedy Vo. 3	"Rock Bottom"	co-writer/producer
grandson	2019	Modern Tragedy Vo. 3	"Oh No!!!"	co-writer/producer
grandson	2019	Modern Tragedy Vo. 3	"Put Me Under"	co-writer/producer
grandson	2019	Modern Tragedy Vo. 3	"Destroy Me"	co-writer/producer
grandson	2019	Modern Tragedy Vo. 3	"Die Young"	co-writer/producer
grandson	2019	-	"Maria"	co-writer/producer (Boonn)
grandson & Mob Rich	2019	-	"Happy Pill"	co-writer/producer (Boonn)
Zero 9:36	2019	You will not be saved	"Leave the Light On"	co-writer/producer (Boonn)
Zero 9:36	2019	You will not be saved	"Anyone But Me"	co-writer/producer (Boonn)
Zero 9:36	2019	You will not be saved	"Reset"	co-writer/producer (Boonn)
Zero 9:36	2019	You will not be saved	"Left Alone"	co-writer/producer (Boonn)
Zero 9:36	2019	You will not be saved	"Breathing"	co-writer/producer (Boonn)
Zero 9:36	2019	You will not be saved	"WWYDF"	co-writer/producer (Boonn)
Zero 9:36 & Boonn	2019	-	"Aim Steady"	co-writer/producer (Boonn)
grandson	2020	Death of an optimist	"Death of an Optimist // Intro"	co-writer/producer (Boonn)
grandson	2020	Death of an optimist	"In Over My Head"	co-writer/producer (Boonn)
grandson	2020	Death of an optimist	"Identity"	co-writer/producer (Boonn)
grandson	2020	Death of an optimist	"Left Behind"	co-writer/producer (Boonn)
grandson	2020	Death of an optimist	"Dirty"	co-writer/producer (Boonn)
grandson	2020	Death of an optimist	"The Ballad of G and X // Interlude"	co-writer/producer (Boonn)
grandson	2020	Death of an optimist	"We Did it!!!"	co-writer/producer (Boonn)
grandson	2020	Death of an optimist	"WWIII"	co-writer/producer (Boonn)
grandson	2020	Death of an optimist	"Riptide"	co-writer/producer (Boonn)
grandson	2020	Death of an optimist	"Pain Shopping"	co-writer/producer (Boonn)
grandson	2020	Death of an optimist	"Drop Dead"	co-writer/producer (Boonn)
grandson	2020	Death of an optimist	"Welcome to Paradise // Outro"	co-writer/producer (Boonn)
grandson ft. Jessie Reyez	2020	Suicide Squad Soundtrack	"Rain"	co-writer/producer (Boonn)
Tom Morello ft. grandson	2020	Atlas Underground Fire	"Hold The Line"	co-writer/producer (Boonn)
Wethan ft. grandson	2020	Fantasy	"All In My Head"	co-writer/producer (Boonn)
KennyHoopla	2020	How will I rest in peace if I'm buried by a highway // Deluxe	"Lost Cause" Remix	co-writer/producer (Boonn)
Oliver Tree	2020		"Cash Machine" Remix	co-writer/producer (Boonn)
Pop Evil	2021	Versatile	"Work"	co-writer/producer (Boonn)
Atreyu	2021	Baptize	"Save Us"	co-writer/producer (Boonn)
Alice Longyu Gao, Alice Glass	2021	-	"Legend"	co-writer/producer (Boonn)
Alice Longyu Gao	2021	High Dragon & Universe	"Never Coming Back"	co-writer/producer (Boonn)
Blue Stones	2022	Pretty Monster	"Don't Miss"	co-writer/producer (Boonn)
Blue Stones	2022	Pretty Monster	"Camera Roll"	co-writer/producer (Boonn)
The Warning, grandson, Zero 9:36	2022	-	"Choke"	co-writer/producer (Boonn)
Zillion	2022	-	"Potluck Lunch For Cannibals"	co-writer/producer (Boonn)
Zillion ft. Mike Dead	2022	-	"Basement"	co-writer/producer (Boonn)
Chris Brown ft. Davido	2022	Breezy (Deluxe)	"Nobody has to know"	co-writer/producer
grandson	2023	I Love You, I'm Trying	"Something to Hide"	co-writer/producer
grandson	2023	I Love You, I'm Trying	"Drones"	co-writer/producer
grandson	2023	I Love You, I'm Trying	"I Love You, I'm Trying"	co-writer/producer
grandson	2023	I Love You, I'm Trying	"Half My Heart"	co-writer/producer
grandson	2023	I Love You, I'm Trying	"When the Bomb Goes"	co-writer/producer
grandson	2023	I Love You, I'm Trying	"Enough"	co-writer/producer
grandson	2023	I Love You, I'm Trying	"Murderer"	co-writer/producer
grandson	2023	I Love You, I'm Trying	"Stuck Here With Me"	co-writer/producer
Rebecca Black	2023	Let her Burn	"What Am I Gonna Do With You?"	co-writer/producer
Baby Jane	2023		"Dreaming of you"	co-writer/producer
Baby Jane	2023		"Owen Gray"	co-writer/producer
Pop Evil	2023	Skeletons	"Sound of Glory"	co-writer/producer
Pop Evil	2023	Skeletons	"Raging Bull"	co-writer/producer
The Warning	2024	Keep Me Fed	"Escapism"	co-writer/producer
