= Everything's Falling =

Studio album by the Warning
- Released: 28 August 2026
- Genres: Alternative rock; hard rock; alternative metal; post-grunge
- Length: 39:04
- Languages: English; Spanish
- Labels: Lava; Republic
- Producer: Anton DeLost

The Warning chronology
Live from Auditorio Nacional, CDMX (2025)	Everything's Falling (2026)

Singles from Everything's Falling
- 1. "Kerosene" Released: 6 March 2026; 2. "Ego" Released: 18 May 2026; 3. "Ritual" Released: 12 June 2026

Everything's Falling is the fifth studio album by the Mexican rock band the Warning. It was released on 28 August 2026 through Lava and Republic Records. Three songs were showcased from the album ahead of its full release: the singles "Kerosene", "Ego" and "Ritual".

At the 2026 Latin Grammy Awards, song "Ego" won the award for Best Rock Song.

== Background and recording ==
As with the Warning's previous studio album Keep Me Fed, Everything's Falling was recorded in their native Monterrey. In May 2026, the band was signed by United Talent Agency for representation in the United States, Mexico and South America.

According to Paulina Villarreal's description:

"Basically, the whole album is about facing failure and having to build yourself up after that. It's that emotional journey that I think all humans go through, and that internal struggle. Either you're fighting with yourself, [or] you feel like you're being pitted against other people. It's a constant battle to become better".

== Release and promotion ==
On 10 June 2026, the Warning announced Everything's Falling, which was released on 28 August 2026.

On 6 March 2026, the Warning released the album's first single "Kerosene" which, in September, would go on to reach number one on Billboard's Mainstream Rock Airplay chart, making the Warning the first all-women band and the first Mexican band to top the chart in its 45-year history. On 18 May, they released the second single "Ego". On 12 June, the band released the album's third single "Ritual".

On 1 September 2026, the band made the instrumental version of all tracks on the album available to purchase as a limited digital download, for 72 hours only.

== Critical reception ==
Professional ratings
Review scores
Source	Rating
Bring the Noise UK	10/10
Dansende Beren	3.5/5 stars
Distorted Sound	9/10
Kerrang!	4/5 stars
Riff Magazine	9/10
Spectrum Culture	65%
The Spill Magazine	4/5 stars

Everything's Falling received positive reviews from music critics. Mike DeWald of Riff Magazine awarded the album nine out of ten, describing its sound as a combination of the swagger of Keep Me Fed and the musical dynamics of Error, while highlighting the band's growth in its songwriting and performances. Lorena Hurtado of Distorted Sound also gave the album nine out of ten, praising its experimentation, heavier passages and balance between vulnerability and energy, while noting that the production did not always capture the full power of Daniela Villarreal's live vocals.

Florin Petrut of Bring the Noise UK gave the album ten out of ten and praised its songwriting, heavier sound and performances by the three band members, although he felt that additional vocal sections from Paulina Villarreal would have strengthened the record. Robbie Allemeesch of the Belgian publication Dansende Beren gave the album three-and-a-half stars out of five. He praised its cohesion, vocals and instrumentation, but felt that "Ego" and "Kerosene" fit less naturally with the rest of the record. Samantha Andujar of The Spill Magazine awarded the album four out of five.

=== Accolades ===
At the 27th Annual Latin Grammy Awards, song "Ego" won the award for Best Rock Song.

== Track listing ==
All tracks are written by Alejandra Villarreal, Daniela Villarreal, Paulina Villarreal, and Anton DeLost, with other writers noted.

Everything's Falling track listing
No.	Title	Writer(s)	Length
1.	"Ritual"		3:23
2.	"Perfect Daughter"		3:24
3.	"Everything's Falling"		3:49
4.	"Why Do You Like It When I Cry?"		3:16
5.	"Bite My Tongue"	Niko Rubio; Anna Schindel	3:19
6.	"Kill or Be Killed"	Nicolas Perez	3:03
7.	"Ego"	Rubio; Mónica Vélez Domínguez	2:53
8.	"Bloodsport"	Rubio	3:18
9.	"Break"	Jacob Kasher Hindlin; Andy Seltzer; Ali Tamposi	3:12
10.	"Bruises"	Kat Leon; Perez	3:09
11.	"Waste Your Time on Me"	Leon; Perez	2:53
12.	"Kerosene"	Rubio	3:25
Total length:			39:04

== Personnel ==
Credits are adapted from Tidal.

=== The Warning ===
- Alejandra Villarreal – bass guitar, background vocals
- Daniela Villarreal – lead vocals, guitar
- Paulina Villarreal – drums, background vocals (all except "Ego"), lead vocals ("Ego")

Additional personnel

- Anton DeLost – keyboards, guitar, percussion

=== Additional contributors ===
- Anton DeLost – production, engineering, mixing
- Jesús "Jeshu" Hernández – engineering
- Carlos Villarreal Melchor – additional engineering
- Jesús Madrid Rodríguez – engineering assistance
- Mike Kalajian – mastering

=== Album art ===
- Rudy Joffroy – creative producer
- Paulina Villarreal – creative director
- Luis F. Nakasima – creative coordinator
- Kristen Sorace – graphic designer
- Brian Ziff – cover photographer
- Adriana Farias – interior/poster photography
- Gemma Valdés Joffroy – styling
- Mapau Vargas – makeup
- Deysi Padilla – hairstylist

The booklet also indicates Solaz, Los Cabos, Baja California Sur, Mexico as the album art shooting location.

== Charts ==
Chart performance for Everything's Falling
Chart (2026)	Peak position
Australian Albums (ARIA)	82
Austrian Albums (Ö3 Austria)	9
Belgian Albums (Ultratop Flanders)	9
Belgian Albums (Ultratop Wallonia)	6
Danish Vinyl Albums (Hitlisten)	31
Dutch Albums (Album Top 100)	18
Finnish Albums (Suomen virallinen lista)	44
French Albums (SNEP)	69
French Rock & Metal Albums (SNEP)	6
German Albums (Offizielle Top 100)	2
German Rock & Metal Albums (Offizielle Top 100)	1
Portuguese Albums (AFP)	120
Scottish Albums (Official Charts)	6
Spanish Albums (Promusicae)	28
Swedish Albums (Sverigetopplistan)	31
Swiss Albums (Schweizer Hitparade)	5
UK Albums (Official Charts)	16
UK Rock & Metal Albums (Official Charts)	1
US Billboard 200	17
US Top Rock & Alternative Albums (Billboard)	4
