= Liceo de Monterrey: Redwood =

- Nuevo León; Mexico

Information
- Former names: Liceo de las Torres; Liceo: Redwood; Liceo de Monterrey
- Funding type: Private school
- Established: 1978; 48 years ago
- Gender: Girls
- Last updated: 8 April 2025

Liceo de Monterrey: Redwood (also known as Liceo de las Torres, Liceo de Monterrey, and Liceo: Redwood) is a private girls school located in Nuevo León, México, established in 1978. It offers kindergarten, primary, junior high and high school education. Its high school has offered the International Baccalaureate diploma (IB) since 2001. The curriculum can include Ethics, Religion, Philosophy, Art, Music and Home Economics along with Language and STEM classes. Extracurricular activities available for students include basketball, soccer, track-and-field, and volleyball.

During the summer of 2022, the school rebranded itself as Liceo de Monterrey: Redwood. Its sister schools---previously known as Liceo de Monterrey (boys) and Liceo de los Rosales---also rebranded to Blueridge and Rosemont respectively.

As a religious school, it includes in its premises a small private church, where students can attend Mass and Eucharistic services almost daily.

== Notable alumni ==
- Daniela Villarreal
- Paulina Villarreal
- Alejandra Villarreal
