= Error (The Warning album) =

Studio album by the Warning
- Released: 24 June 2022
- Studios: Iiwii Studios; Magic Door; Sound on Sound; Ferretti's Studios (New Jersey, United States)
- Genres: Alternative rock; hard rock; alternative metal; post-grunge
- Length: 48:49
- Languages: English; Spanish
- Labels: Lava; Republic
- Producer: David Bendeth

The Warning chronology
Mayday (2021)	Error (2022)	Keep Me Fed (2024)

Singles from Error
- 1. "Choke" Released: 21 May 2021; 2. "Money" Released: 25 March 2022

Error is the third studio album by the Mexican rock band the Warning. It was released on 24 June 2022, through Lava and Republic Records. The song "Money" reached the top 40 on the Billboard Mainstream Rock Airplay chart.

== Background ==
Error is the Warning's first full-length album to be released via Lava Records, with which the band signed a multi-album deal in 2020. The first song to be released from the recording sessions was "Choke" in May 2021. Six of the album's songs had previously been released on the EP Mayday in October 2021. The first of the new songs, "Money", was released as a preview single in March 2022. The band describes the album as "about how we perceive the world as a generation and how we experience things in this new age – Love, technology, social life, media, politics; losing our sense of humanity and everything in between".

== Critical reception ==
Critical appraisal of the album has been positive. One reviewer commented, "The Warning is a band on the warpath, spearheading an album with so much lyrical and musical energy. Their sound has a mix of well-tuned guitar parts which are electrifying and atmospheric, and on their album Error, the trio become titans of their art". Alternative Press called the album "a rock radio-ready beast". Loudwire included the album in its list of the 50 best rock and metal albums of 2022.

== Track listing ==
All tracks are written by Daniela Villarreal, Paulina Villarreal and Alejandra Villarreal except where noted.

No.	Title	Writer(s)	Length
1.	"Intro 404"	D. Villarreal; P. Villarreal; A. Villarreal; David Bendeth; Jake Carmona	0:57
2.	"Disciple"		3:40
3.	"Choke"	D. Villarreal; P. Villarreal; A. Villarreal; J. Carmona	3:52
4.	"Animosity"		4:06
5.	"Money"		3:15
6.	"Amour"		3:55
7.	"Evolve"	D. Villarreal; P. Villarreal; A. Villarreal; J. Carmona	3:33
8.	"Error"	D. Villarreal; P. Villarreal; A. Villarreal; D. Bendeth	3:57
9.	"Z"		3:03
10.	"23"	D. Villarreal; P. Villarreal; A. Villarreal; D. Bendeth	4:00
11.	"Kool Aid Kids"		3:23
12.	"Revenant"		4:22
13.	"Martirio"		4:04
14.	"Breathe" (bonus track)	P. Villarreal	2:49
Total length:			48:49

== Personnel ==
The Warning

- Daniela Villarreal – guitar, lead vocals (tracks 2–9, 11 and 13), backing vocals (track 10 and 12)
- Paulina Villarreal – drums (except tracks 12 and 14), backing vocals (tracks 3–8, 11 and 13), co-lead vocals (tracks 2 and 9), lead vocals (track 10, 12 and 14), piano (track 14)
- Alejandra Villarreal – bass guitar (except track 14), backing vocals (tracks 2–13)

Also with

- David Bendeth – keyboards, guitar, percussion

Production

- David Bendeth – producer, mixing, arrangements
- Rick Carson, Mike Ferretti – engineers
- Bobby Huff, Jaren Sorenson – editing
- John Bender – vocal editing
- Ted Jensen – mastering

== Charts ==
Chart performance for Error
Chart (2026)	Peak position
Scottish Albums (Official Charts)	78
UK Albums Sales (OCC)	50
UK Rock & Metal Albums (Official Charts)	8
