= I Love You, I'm Trying =

Studio album by Grandson
- Released: May 5, 2023
- Length: 32:25
- Label: Fueled by Ramen
- Producers: Wafia Al-Rikabi; Taylor Bird; Boon; Colin Brittain; Flynn; Grandson; Kevin Hissink; Maxwell Joseph; Jon Levine; Lil Aaron; No Love for the Middle Child; Krupa; David Pramik; Joey Resly; Mike Shinoda

Grandson chronology
Death of an Optimist (2020)	I Love You, I'm Trying (2023)	Inertia (2025)

Singles from I Love You, I'm Trying
- 1. "Eulogy" Released: February 28, 2023; 2. "Drones" Released: March 24, 2023; 3. "Something to Hide" Released: April 21, 2023

I Love You, I'm Trying is the second studio album by Canadian-American musician Grandson. The album was released on May 5, 2023, by Fueled by Ramen. Three lead singles, "Eulogy", "Drones", and "Something to Hide", were released along with an announcement in anticipation of the album. The singles were released February 28, March 24, and April 21 respectively.

== Background ==
Two years after the release of Grandson's debut studio album, Death of an Optimist, in February 2023, he began teasing a new single, lyrics and the album. On February 28, 2023, the single titled "Eulogy" was released and a tour was announced to begin May 12, 2023, just a week after the album's release date. The track's lyrics delve into the overwhelming situations of life on the internet. In March 2023, grandson released the second single, "Drones", and announced the release date for the album of May 5, 2023, along with the cover art. "Something to Hide" was released as the third single in April 2023, with the song reflecting on his family life and personal relationships.

== Critical reception ==
Reviews were mixed, leaning to positive, with all noting a more introspective and emotionally direct approach but some suggesting this distracted from the instant impact of previous works. The album received 8/10 rating from The Line of Best Fit, 6/10 from God Is in the TV, and an aggregate user review of 59/100 on Album of the Year. In June 2023, while Rock Sound had it at number 43 in their top 50 albums of 2023. Alternative Press included it in an unranked mid-year list of the top 25 albums of the year to date, calling it "a foray into the personal".

== Track listing ==
I Love You, I'm Trying track listing
No.	Title	Writer(s)	Producer(s)	Length
1.	"Two Along Their Way"	Jordan Benjamin; Robert Benjamin; Joey Resly; Lisa Scinta	Grandson; Resly	1:07
2.	"Eulogy"	J. Benjamin; Edison Eason	Grandson; Boon	2:22
3.	"Something to Hide"	J. Benjamin; Chester Carbone; Kevin Hissink	Grandson; Hissink; Krupa	2:00
4.	"Drones"	J. Benjamin; Eason; Hissink; Geoff Warburton	Grandson; Boon; Hissink	2:30
5.	"I Love You, I'm Trying"	J. Benjamin; Hissink; Jon Levine; David Pramik	Grandson; Hissink; Levine; Pramik	2:43
6.	"Half My Heart"	J. Benjamin; Taylor Bird; Colin Brittain; Ross Golan; Hissink; Mike Shinoda	Grandson; Bird; Brittain; Shinoda	2:45
7.	"When the Bomb Goes"	J. Benjamin; Carbone; Kristine Flaherty; John Flynn; Hissink; Levine	Grandson; Flynn; Hissink; Krupa; Levine	2:35
8.	"Enough"	J. Benjamin; Carbone; Hissink; Aaron Puckett	Grandson; Boon; Hissink; Krupa; Lil Aaron	3:41
9.	"Murderer"	J. Benjamin; Bird; Geoff Earley; Eason; Sam Harris; Hissink	Grandson; Boon	4:25
10.	"I Will Be Here When You're Ready to Wake Up" (featuring Wafia)	J. Benjamin; Resly; Scinta	Grandson; Wafia Al-Rikabi; Resly	1:01
11.	"Heather"	J. Benjamin; Maxwell Joseph; Andrew Milgiore	Grandson; Joseph; No Love for the Middle Child	3:19
12.	"Stuck Here with Me"	J. Benjamin; Hissink; Levine; Luke Spiller	Grandson; Hissink; Levine	3:57
Total length:				32:25

== Personnel ==
Credits adapted from Tidal.

- Grandson – vocals (all tracks), guitar (tracks 3, 5, 10), bass (3, 5), keyboards (6, 12), drums (12)
- Andrew Dawson – mixing
- Chris Gehringer – mastering
- Robert Benjamin – background vocals, piano (1)
- Wafia Al-Rikabi – background vocals (1)
- Kevin Hissink – guitar (3, 5, 8, 9, 12), bass (3, 5, 7, 9)
- Krupa – synthesizer (3, 7, 8)
- Jon Levine – drums, keyboards, vocoder (5); guitar (7), synthesizer (12)
- Wafia Al-Rikabi – background vocals (6–8, 10)
- Mike Shinoda – background vocals (6)
- Colin Brittain – guitar, keyboards (6)
- Kristine Flaherty – background vocals (7)
- Flynn – synthesizer (7)
- Edison Boon Eason – guitar, synthesizer (8, 9); bass (9)
- Sam Harris – background vocals (9)
- Andrew Migliore – strings (9) cello, guitar, piano (11)
- Joey Resly – bass, keyboards (10)
- Maxwell Joseph – synthesizer (11)
- Luke Spiller – additional vocals (12)
