= Venom: The Last Dance (soundtrack) =

Venom: The Last Dance (Original Motion Picture Soundtrack)

Film score by Dan Deacon
- Released: October 25, 2024
- Studio: Sony Scoring Stage
- Genre: Film score
- Length: 57:27
- Label: Sony Classical

Dan Deacon chronology
Hustle (2022)	Venom: The Last Dance (Original Motion Picture Soundtrack) (2024)	Rez Ball (2024)

Venom: The Last Dance (Original Motion Picture Soundtrack) is the soundtrack for the 2024 American superhero film Venom: The Last Dance directed by Kelly Marcel, featuring the Marvel Comics character Venom, the fifth installment in Sony's Spider-Man Universe and the sequel to Venom (2018) and Venom: Let There Be Carnage (2021), features an original score composed by Dan Deacon and a series of songs in the film.

Deacon's score was released by Sony Classical Records in digital formats on October 25, 2024, in conjunction with the film's release.

== Development ==
By August 2024, Dan Deacon was revealed to have composed the film's score, after previously working with Kelly Marcel on The Changeling (2023). The soundtrack album was released on October 25, 2024, by Sony Classical.

== Track listing ==
All music is composed by Dan Deacon.

No.	Title	Artist(s)	Length
1.	"Knull's Order"		1:24
2.	"Area 51 to 55"	Deacon; Skylar Grey	2:35
3.	"Venom and Eddie at the River"		1:52
4.	"Hanging Out at the Waterfall"		2:04
5.	"Newsflash"		1:45
6.	"Lab Battle"		3:27
7.	"Remember Me"	Deacon; Grey	8:13
8.	"Sky Dive"		0:38
9.	"Desert Walk"		0:38
10.	"Frequent Flyers"		0:45
11.	"Strickland Reprimands Paine"		1:48
12.	"Sneaking Around"		1:04
13.	"What Are You Doing Here"		2:18
14.	"Request Permission"		0:59
15.	"Say When"		3:41
16.	"Phoning Home"		4:39
17.	"Ramping Up"		1:19
18.	"Strickland and Paine"		2:23
19.	"General Bosco Banana Man"		1:03
20.	"Explaining the Backstory"		5:39
21.	"Crashing the Party"		0:45
22.	"Following the Osprey"		0:49
23.	"Safer Underground"		0:47
24.	"Poking Around"		1:38
25.	"Blasting Out"		1:11
26.	"It's Not Safe Here"		1:57
27.	"Last Try"		0:58
28.	"It's a Showdown"		1:08
Total length:			57:27

== Additional songs ==
Additional songs are featured in the movie:

- "Memories" by Maroon 5
- "One Last Dance" by Tom Morello, Roman Morello, and Grandson
- "Don't Stop Me Now" by Queen
- "Space Oddity" by David Bowie
- "Wild World" by Cat Stevens
- "Dancing Queen" by A*Teens, as seen in the movie's credits.
- "I Had Some Help" by Post Malone featuring Morgan Wallen
- "Bailando Cumbia" by Danny Osuna
- "Knull & Void" by Czarface featuring Frankie Pullitzer & Method Man
- "Hard to Handle" by Otis Redding
