= Death of an Optimist =

Studio album by Grandson
- Released: December 4, 2020
- Recorded: 2019–2020
- Genre: Rap rock, alternative rock
- Length: 38:00
- Label: Fueled by Ramen
- Producer: Travis Barker; Taylor Bird; Boonn; Andrew Dawson; JT Daly; Krupa; No Love for the Middle Child; Mike Shinoda; Gabe Simon

Grandson chronology
A Modern Tragedy Vol. 3 (2019)	Death of an Optimist (2020)	I Love You, I'm Trying (2023)

Singles from Death of an Optimist
- 1. "Identity" Released: June 26, 2020; 2. "Riptide" Released: July 31, 2020; 3. "Dirty" Released: September 25, 2020; 4. "We Did It!!!" Released: November 13, 2020

Death of an Optimist is the debut studio album by Canadian-American musician Grandson. The album was released on December 4, 2020, through Fueled by Ramen.

== Background and recording ==
Benjamin's EP, A Modern Tragedy, Vol. 3 was released on September 13, 2019. After the release of the third and final EP of the A Modern Tragedy trilogy, Grandson began working on his first studio album.

The album was first announced on September 23, 2020, with the single "Dirty".

== Music and composition ==
In an interview with NME, Grandson said that Death of an Optimist is a critical outlook of the current state of affairs and of the year 2020 in general saying, "it is both an origin story and an obituary navigating hope, anxiety, and the state of optimism in 2020."

== Reception ==
Professional ratings
Review scores
Source	Rating
Kerrang!	4/5 stars

Initial reaction to the album has been positive. David McLaughlin of Kerrang! praised grandson's blending of sounds, saying, "Here’s an artist unafraid of flexing his creativity, exploring sounds from whatever genre tickles his fancy." The Rock Matters Podcast said, "It’s very much a millennial coming of age album. It’s a guy in his mid-20s trying to cling to hope that real change for a better future is possible. And credit to Grandson. He definitely sounds like he's in for the fight."

== Track listing ==
Death of an Optimist track listing
No.	Title	Writer(s)	Producer(s)	Length
1.	"Death of an Optimist // Intro"	Jordan Benjamin; Chester Krupa Carbone; Kevin Hissink; Maxwell Joseph	Boonn; Krupa	2:31
2.	"In Over My Head"	Benjamin; Carbone; JT Daly; Hissink	Boonn; Krupa; Daly	3:18
3.	"Identity"	Benjamin; Carbone; Andrew Dawson; Hissink	Boonn; Krupa; Dawson	3:36
4.	"Left Behind"	Benjamin; Carbone; Hissink; Sam Hollander; Andrew Migliore	Boonn; Krupa; No Love for the Middle Child	3:25
5.	"Dirty"	Benjamin; Carbone; Hissink; Gabe Simon	Boonn; Krupa; Simon	3:28
6.	"The Ballad of G and X // Interlude"	Benjamin; Carbone; Hissink	Boonn; Krupa	2:22
7.	"We Did It!!!"	Benjamin; Carbone; Daly; Hissink; Joseph	Boonn; Krupa; Daly	2:49
8.	"WWIII"	Benjamin; Carbone; Hissink	Boonn; Krupa	3:22
9.	"Riptide"	Benjamin; Taylor Bird; Hissink; Mike Shinoda	Boonn; Bird; Shinoda	3:12
10.	"Pain Shopping"	Benjamin; Carbone; Hissink; Daniel Ledinsky	Boonn; Krupa	3:17
11.	"Drop Dead"	Benjamin; Travis Barker; Carbone; Hissink	Boonn; Krupa; Barker	3:09
12.	"Welcome to Paradise // Outro"	Benjamin; Carbone; Ross Golan; Hissink	Boonn; Krupa	3:31
Total length:				38:00

== Personnel ==
- Grandson – vocals (all tracks), programming (track 3)
- Chris Gehringer – mastering (tracks 1, 2, 4–8, 10–12)
- Mark Jackson – mastering (track 3)
- Taylor Bird – mastering, mixing, programming (track 9)
- Krupa – mixing (tracks 1, 3, 6, 12), programming (3, 5, 7)
- Adam Hawkins – mixing (tracks 2, 5, 11)
- Nick Rad – mixing (tracks 4, 7, 8, 10)
- Andrew Dawson – programming (track 3)
- Kevin Hissink – programming (track 3)
- Boonn – programming (tracks 5, 7)
- Gabe Simon – programming (track 5)
- JT Daly – programming (track 7)
- Mike Shinoda – programming (track 9)

== Charts ==
Chart performance for Death of an Optimist
Chart (2020)	Peak position
UK R&B Albums (OCC)	28
US Heatseekers Albums (Billboard)	7

== See also ==
- Blood // Water
