= Keep Me Fed =

Studio album by the Warning
- Released: 28 June 2024
- Studios: Malonic Records; Serca Studios (Monterrey, Mexico)
- Genres: Alternative rock; hard rock; alternative metal; post-grunge
- Length: 38:33
- Languages: English; Spanish
- Labels: Lava; Republic
- Producer: Anton DeLost

The Warning chronology
Error (2022)	Keep Me Fed (2024)	Live from Auditorio Nacional, CDMX (2025)

Singles from Keep Me Fed
- 1. "More" Released: 12 May 2023; 2. "Sick" Released: 2 February 2024; 3. "Hell You Call a Dream" / "Qué Más Quieres" Released: 8 March 2024; 4. "Automatic Sun" Released: 5 April 2024; 5. "Burnout" Released: 17 May 2024

Professional ratings
Review scores
Source	Rating
The Line of Best Fit	7/10
Classic Rock	3.5/5
New Noise Magazine	5/5 stars

Keep Me Fed is the fourth studio album by the Mexican rock band the Warning. It was released on 28 June 2024, through Lava and Republic Records.

Six singles were released ahead of the album. The first single, "More", peaked at number 36 on the Billboard Mainstream Rock Airplay chart, staying on the chart for seven weeks. The second single, "Sick", reached number eight on the Billboard Mainstream Rock Airplay chart, remaining on the chart for 20 weeks.

"Sick" is featured on Loudwire's list of "Best Rock + Metal Songs of 2024 (So Far)". This track was also selected to the soundtrack of Madden NFL 26 video game.

Keep Me Fed was chosen to the 19th position on the Kerrang! magazine's "The 50 Best Albums of 2024" list and to the 11th position on the Rock Sound magazine's "Top 24 Albums of 2024" list. The LP was included by the French rock magazine Hard Force in its list of "Top Albums 2024".

The song "Qué Más Quieres" was nominated at the Latin Grammy Awards in the Best Rock Song category. This track was also selected to the soundtrack of WWE 2K26 video game.

== Album cover ==
The meaning of the cover art is explained by Paulina Villarreal:

"The main image of the album shows a scene filled with excess, and we are also actresses of this excess. There is too much of everything on this table and people who seem very respectable consume much more than they really need to live. That's why we got on it and we try to stop – or at least slow down – this orgy. But in the end, sad to say, we still participate in it. We are also at this table. It represents what we live on a daily basis and what we try to fight in our small way".

== Track listing ==
All tracks are written by Daniela, Paulina, and Alejandra Villarreal, and Anton Curtis DeLost, with additional writers noted below. All tracks are produced by DeLost, with others noted below.

No.	Title	Writer(s)	Producer(s)	Length
1.	"Six Feet Deep"	Dan Lancaster	Lancaster	2:59
2.	"Sick"			3:12
3.	"Apologize"			3:41
4.	"Qué Más Quieres"	Monica Velez; Shaun Lopez; Kathryn Ostenberg		3:04
5.	"More"	Danielle Nicole Rubio		3:07
6.	"Escapism"	Kevin Hissink	Boonn	3:36
7.	"Satisfied"	Kat Leon; Nick Perez		3:09
8.	"Burnout"	Sam Hollander		3:24
9.	"Sharks"	Mike Elizondo; Sara Davis		3:08
10.	"Hell You Call a Dream"	Lancaster; Matt Squire; Curtis James Peoples	Lancaster	2:56
11.	"Consume"	Elizondo; Laura Veltz		3:07
12.	"Automatic Sun"	Lancaster	Lancaster	3:10
Total length:				38:33

== Personnel ==
The Warning

- Daniela Villarreal – lead vocals, guitar
- Paulina Villarreal – drums, backing vocals, co-lead vocals (track 9 and 11)
- Alejandra Villarreal – bass guitar, backing vocals (track 10)

Additional personnel

- Anton DeLost – keyboard, guitar, percussion
- Dan Lancaster – backing vocals (tracks 1 and 12)
- Kevin "Boonn" Hissink – additional guitar (track 6)

Production

- Anton DeLost – producer, mixing, engineering
- Dan Lancaster – co-producer (tracks 1, 10 and 12)
- Kevin "Boonn" Hissink – additional producer (track 6)
- Diego Mejía – recording engineer assistant
- Ted Jensen – mastering

Artwork

- The Warning – art direction
- Paulina Villarreal – creative director, art direction
- Rudy Joffroy – art direction
- Marco Reynosa – photography, art direction
- Gemma Valdes Joffroy – styling
- Gerardo Parra – make-up

== Charts ==
Chart performance for Keep Me Fed
Chart (2024)	Peak position
Austrian Albums (Ö3 Austria)	39
Belgian Albums (Ultratop Flanders)	122
Belgian Albums (Ultratop Wallonia)	192
French Rock & Metal Albums (SNEP)	23
German Albums (Offizielle Top 100)	19
Spanish Albums (Promusicae)	79
Swedish Physical Albums (Sverigetopplistan)	15
Swiss Albums (Schweizer Hitparade)	14
UK Rock & Metal Albums (Official Charts)	1
US Billboard 200	59
