= Marieme =

Senegalese-American singer-songwriter

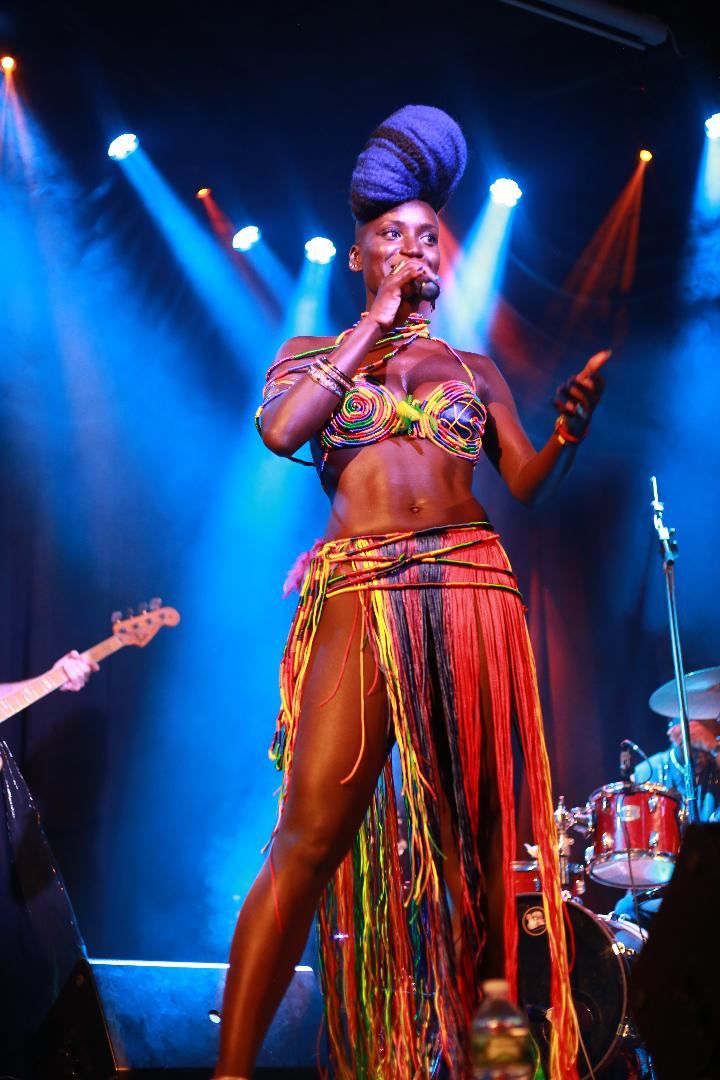
- Marieme in 2020

Background information
- Born: Marieme Diop; Nouakchott, Mauritania
- Origin: Senegal
- Genres: R&B, pop, jazz
- Occupations: Singer, songwriter
- Years active: 2017–present
- Labels: Caroline Records, independent
- Website: www.mariememusic.com

Marieme Diop, known mononymously as Marieme, is a Senegalese-American singer and songwriter with a multi-octave voice whose music has R&B, pop and jazz influences. Her musical themes reflect her youth affected by war and her subsequent world travels.

She has released two EPs, one acoustic visual EP, and her songs have been used in several television shows and in film.

== Early life ==
Marieme Diop was born in Nouakchott, Mauritania, where her father was an executive at a regional electrical company. When she was six months old, war broke out between that country and Senegal forcing her family to escape leaving behind a comfortable lifestyle and keeping nothing. Marieme and her siblings lived with her aunt in Senegal, while her parents moved to the Bronx, New York in the United States. The family reunited five years later in New York.

"I grew up in Senegal until I was seven years old. There was always music around, but it wasn't encouraged—I grew up in a very religious household. When I came to America, I found a box of CDs under my parents' bed. It was a surprise to me because I didn't think they listened to music. I found out later that my dad was the one who bought it because there was a discount at his job or something. There were CDs by Ace of Base, Mariah Carey, Whitney Houston, and more—about ten albums. I would put them on and cry because of the way the music made me feel. Mariah Carey's album changed my life. I was learning English through listening to music, which was a powerful connection. My assimilation to America was all through music. I was teased a lot for my skin color and for being straight from Africa."

At the University of Buffalo, Marieme studied journalism and communication, and even studied and interned in feature writing in London, England. It was in high school when a jazz history class played Billie Holiday that she realized what she wanted to become, and did so with a vocal range of several octaves.

Marieme lives in both New York City and Los Angeles, California.

== Music career ==
In 2017, Marieme moved from New York to Los Angeles, and two days after arriving, she wrote the song "Leave" with producer/songwriter Andy Rose. Shortly after, with three songs completed, she got a deal from Jason Markey of Universal Music Publishing Group. She started writing with producers such as Theron "Neff-U" Feemster, who has worked with Michael Jackson, Eminem, Justin Bieber, Dr. Dre, and Ne-Yo.

Marieme released an eponymous EP in February 2018 on Caroline Records. The EP featured three songs, "Leave", "Be the Change", and "Ask for Help". Of the latter, she told Music in Africa: "In this society, we are faced with so much. As we learn more and more about ourselves and the human condition over time, it is very important to know our limits in order to be able to exceed them and be able to reach our true goal. Often, misplaced pride keeps us from moving forward, and in the song we meant not to be too proud and to be able to ask for help when we needed it. The most powerful way to do this is through music."

In April 2018, the Marieme song "What's Cool" was included on the soundtrack for the Amy Schumer film, I Feel Pretty. The album was released by Sony Music.

In October 2019, she began releasing a series of acoustic videos of songs from the Marieme EP. The visual work preceded the release of her acoustic visual EP in January 2019.

Early in 2019, "Ask for Help" was used as the promotion for the nationwide season premiere of Iyanla: Fix My Life on Oprah's OWN Network, and in an episode of the CBS mini-series The Red Line.

In 2019, LinkedIn struck a deal with Marieme to create an anthem for the business site. Her version of the Cat Stevens song "Be What You Must" became part of their promotion beginning in November 2019.

The Marieme song "Rogue" is one of several that are being played in the Apple TV+ television series Truth Be Told, which became available on the platform on December 13, 2019. The song is also used in worldwide TV and digital commercials about the show.

Glamour UK named Marieme a powerhouse and she has been featured in many other publications, including V and Vogue Brazil.

Since the beginning of her musical career, Marieme has performed around the world, the biggest venue being Red Rocks Amphitheater in Colorado, joining Trevor Hall for the collaboration of their hit song "2 Oceans".

In 2023, Marieme's song "Built for Greatness" was featured as the promotional song for the Netflix special The Light We Carry, by Michelle Obama and Oprah Winfrey.

Marieme's first single from her upcoming debut album was released to critical acclaim after it was featured in two prominent scenes on major television shows: the finale of Good Trouble and an emotional scene in Grey's Anatomy.
