= Grandson (musician) =

American-Canadian musician (born 1993)

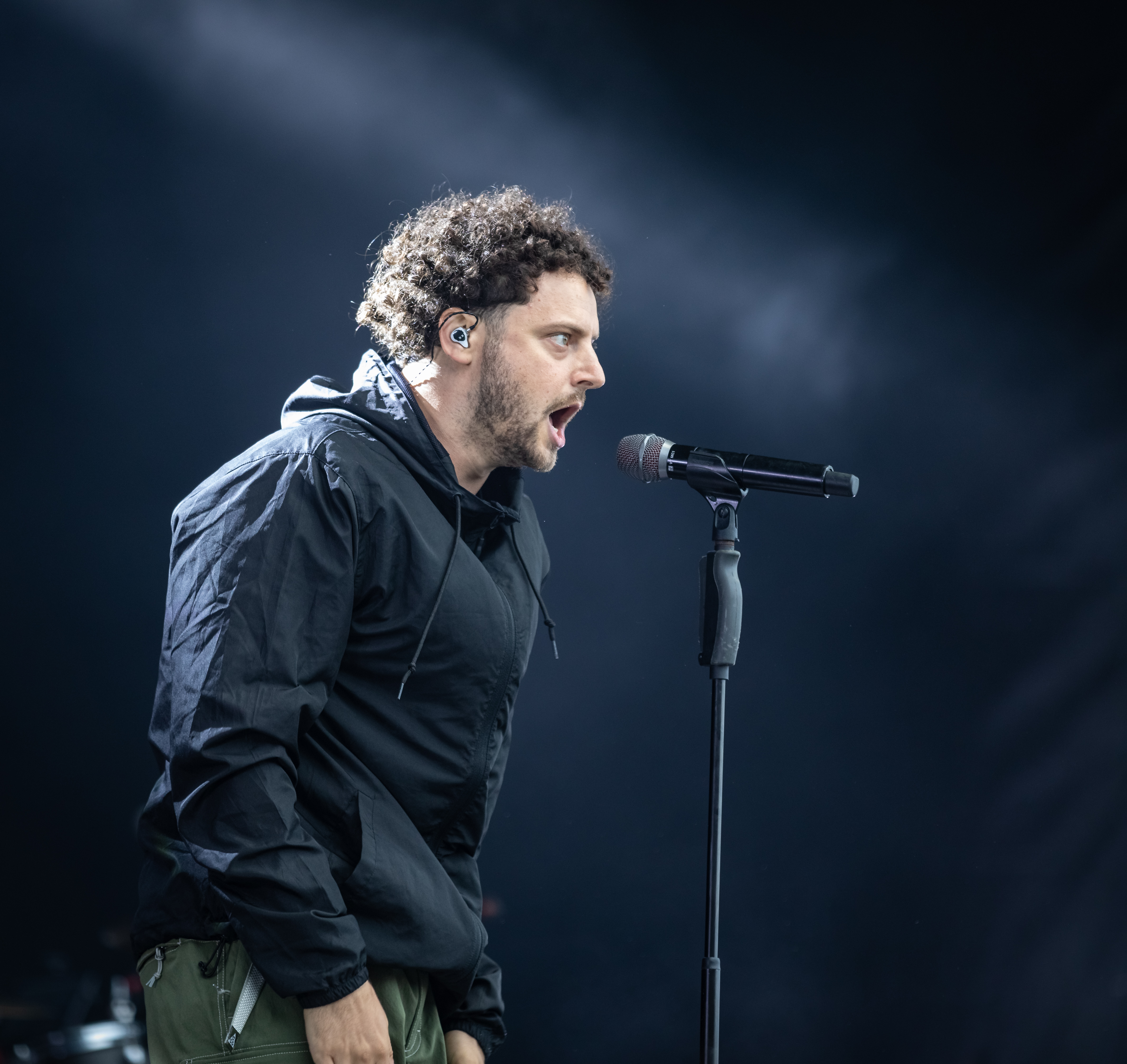
- Grandson performing in 2022
- Born: Jordan Edward Benjamin; October 25, 1993 (age 33); Englewood, New Jersey, U.S.
- Occupations: Singer; songwriter; rapper
- Years active: 2014–present
- Musical career
- Origin: Toronto, Ontario, Canada
- Genres: Alternative rock; rap rock; alternative hip hop; political hip hop; trap; EDM
- Instruments: Vocals; guitar; piano
- Labels: Fueled by Ramen; RCA; XX
- Website: grandsonmusic.com

Jordan Edward Benjamin (born October 25, 1993), known professionally as Grandson (stylized as grandson), is an American and Canadian singer, songwriter, and rapper. He released his major label debut EP, A Modern Tragedy Vol. 1, on June 15, 2018, and released the follow-up A Modern Tragedy Vol. 2 on February 22, 2019. The initial EP featured the single "Blood // Water", which appeared on several Billboard charts in the United States and Canada. Benjamin's music focuses on modern-day issues that are less recognized by the media and public. On December 4, 2020, he released his debut studio album, Death of an Optimist, and his second album, I Love You, I'm Trying, was released on May 5, 2023. On September 5, 2025, his third album Inertia was released.

== Early life and education ==
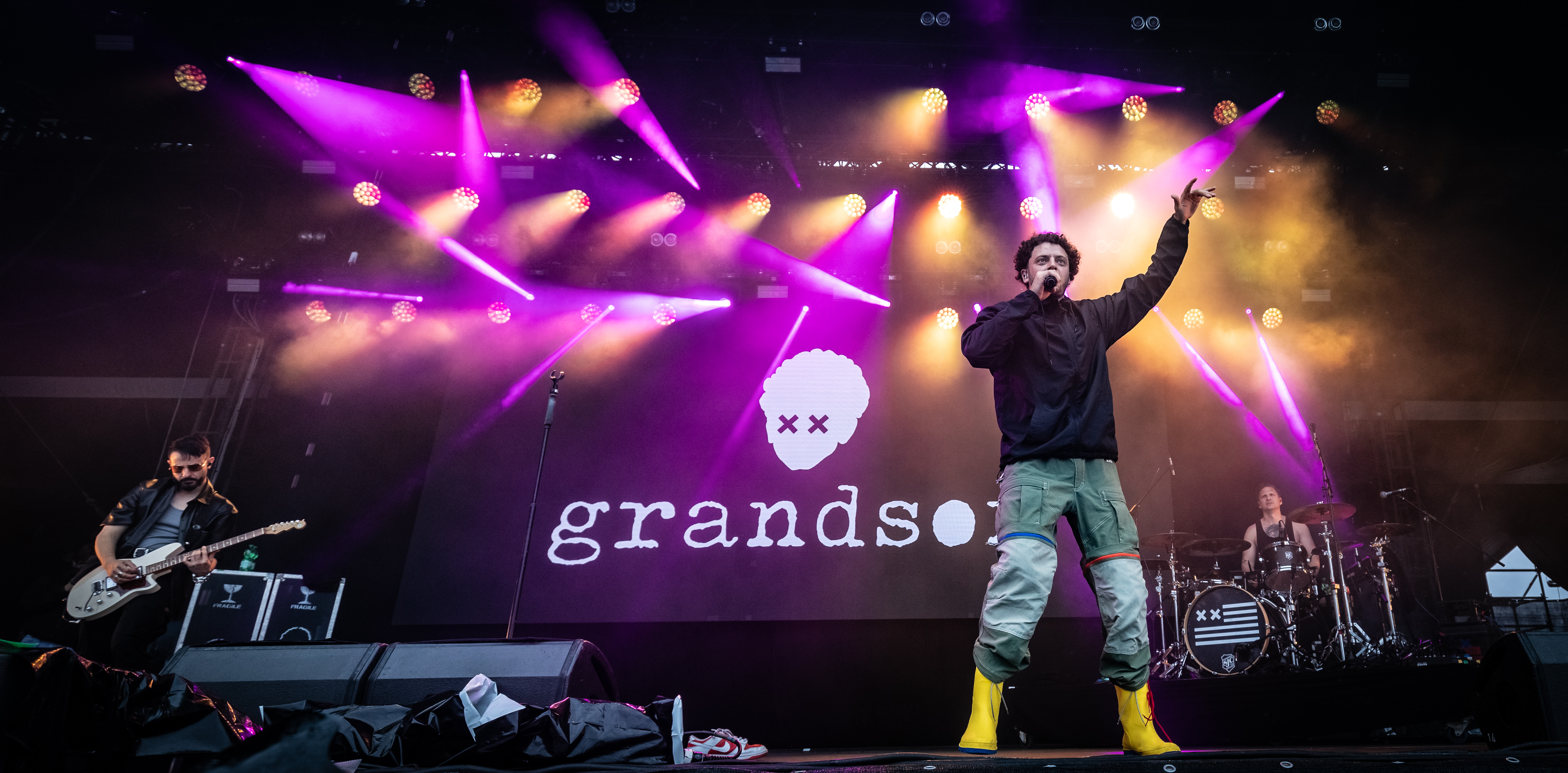
Grandson live at Rock am Ring 2022

Benjamin was born in New Jersey, United States. When he was 3 years old, his family moved to a Jewish neighborhood in Toronto, Ontario, where his maternal relatives lived (he holds dual citizenship of both countries). He is Jewish. He has two sisters. Benjamin grew up largely in the Eglinton West area of Toronto. He attended Northern Secondary School in Toronto and, after graduation, enrolled in McGill University in Montreal. There, he studied education with the initial goal of becoming a teacher. He also spent a great deal of time DJing and playing shows in Montreal while at McGill. After two years, he transferred to Concordia University, another Montreal institution. He studied communications there briefly before dropping out and moving to Los Angeles in 2014 to pursue a music career.

== Career ==
Benjamin began releasing music under the pseudonym grandson in late 2015. In 2016, he released several singles that accrued millions of streams, including "Bills", "Things Change", and "Bury Me Face Down". In 2017, he was signed to RCA Records, and continued releasing singles, including "Best Friends" and "Kiss Bang". He also performed at North by Northeast that year (among other festivals).

In April 2018, it was announced that grandson had signed to the Fueled By Ramen record label. He had also released two new singles, "Blood // Water" and "Thoughts & Prayers", which offered a critique of American gun laws in the wake of the shooting at Marjory Stoneman Douglas High School in Parkland, Florida. He released his first EP on Fueled by Ramen, A Modern Tragedy Vol. 1, in June 2018. That EP also featured the song "6:00" which discussed police brutality. Also in June 2018, grandson was featured on Mike Shinoda's song "Running from My Shadow", taken from his debut album Post Traumatic; the track was released also with an accompanying music video in May 2018.

Throughout 2018, grandson toured with acts like Hobo Johnson, Joywave, Nothing But Thieves, Smashing Pumpkins, and Young the Giant. He also appeared on an episode of Late Night with Seth Meyers in August 2018, performing "Blood // Water".

In February 2019, he released a new single, "Apologize", and announced his second EP, A Modern Tragedy Vol. 2, which was released on February 22, 2019. In late May, grandson released a cover of Rage Against the Machine's "Maria", a song featured on the 1999 album The Battle of Los Angeles.

In June 2019, he won the SOCAN Songwriting Prize for his song "Blood // Water", while in September 2019 the singer released A Modern Tragedy Vol. 3, the final installment of the Modern Tragedy trilogy; the record features the lead single "Rock Bottom", which peaked at No. 38 on the Canadian Rock Chart.

On September 23, 2020, Grandson announced on his Facebook page that his debut full-length album Death of an Optimist would be released on December 4, 2020. Death of an Optimist is Grandson's debut album, being his first record to have a heavier tone since the release of the last A Modern Tragedy Vol. 3.

He announced a new album, I Love You, I'm Trying in May 2022, and it was released in May 2023.

In September 2024, it was announced that Grandson would be one of the opening acts for Linkin Park on their From Zero World Tour, their first in 7 years and without former lead singer Chester Bennington following his death.

In a reply to a fan's tweet on Twitter on May 30, 2025, Grandson revealed he was now an independent artist.

On May 30, 2025, Grandson announced his third album, Inertia, teasing it with the tagline "It's Never Enough Rest, Tomorrow Is Approaching", through his independent label, XX Records. The album was released on September 5, 2025.

On October 3, 2026, Grandson will perform at the Power to the People Festival organized by Tom Morello and featuring Bruce Springsteen, Foo Fighters, and others. The festival, to be held at Merriweather Post Pavilion in Columbia, MD, was organized as a protest against President Donald Trump.

== Discography ==
=== Studio albums ===
List of albums with selected album details and peak chart positions
Title	Details	Peak chart positions
Title	Details	US Heat.
Death of an Optimist	Released: December 4, 2020; Label: Fueled by Ramen; Formats: Digital download, CD, vinyl	7
I Love You, I'm Trying	Released: May 5, 2023; Label: Fueled by Ramen; Formats: Digital download, CD, vinyl	—
Inertia	Released: September 5, 2025; Label: XX Records; Formats: Digital download, CD, vinyl	—

=== EPs ===
List of EPs with selected album details and peak chart positions
Title	Details	Peak chart positions
Title	Details	US Heat.
A Modern Tragedy Vol. 1	Released: June 15, 2018; Label: Fueled by Ramen; Formats: Digital download, CD	—
Broken Down Vol. 1	Released: August 17, 2018; Label: Fueled by Ramen; Formats: Digital download	—
A Modern Tragedy Vol. 2	Released: February 22, 2019 (US); Label: Fueled by Ramen; Formats: Digital download, CD	23
No Apologies Live	Released: June 11, 2019; Label: Fueled by Ramen; Formats: Digital download	—
A Modern Tragedy Vol. 3	Released: September 13, 2019; Label: Fueled by Ramen; Formats: Digital download, CD	—

=== Singles ===
List of singles, with selected chart positions, showing year released and album name
Title	Year	Peak chart positions							Certifications	Album
Title	Year	CAN AC	CAN Rock	CZ	LTU	US Alt	US Main	US Rock	Certifications	Album
"Bills"	2016	—	—	—	—	—	—	—		Non-album singles
"Things Change"	2016	—	—	—	—	—	—	—		Non-album singles
"Bury Me Face Down"	2016	—	—	—	—	—	—	—	MC: Gold	Non-album singles
"Kiss Bang"	2017	—	—	—	—	—	—	—		Non-album singles
"Best Friends"	2017	—	—	—	—	—	—	—		Non-album singles
"War"	2017	—	—	—	—	—	—	—		Non-album singles
"Blood // Water"	2017	—	19	—	93	20	17	19	MC: 3× Platinum; AFP: Gold; ARIA: 2× Platinum; BPI: Gold; BVMI: Gold; IFPI AUT: Platinum; RIAA: 2× Platinum; SNEP: Gold	A Modern Tragedy Vol. 1
"Overdose"	2018	—	—	—	—	—	—	—		A Modern Tragedy Vol. 1
"Thoughts & Prayers"	2018	—	—	—	—	—	—	—		Non-album single
"Apologize"	2019	—	5	—	—	34	20	— (Note: "Apologize" did not enter the Hot Rock & Alternative Songs chart, but peaked at number 49 on the Rock & Alternative Airplay chart.)	MC: Gold	A Modern Tragedy Vol. 2
"Maria"	2019	—	—	—	—	—	—	—		Rock Sound Presents: Worship And Tributes Vol. 2
"Despicable"	2019	—	—	—	—	—	—	—		A Modern Tragedy Vol. 1
"Rock Bottom"	2019	—	26	—	—	—	—	—		A Modern Tragedy Vol. 3
"Oh No!!!" (original or with Vic Mensa & Masked Wolf)	2019	—	—	—	—	— (Note: "Oh No!!!" did not enter the Alternative Airplay chart, but peaked at number 15 on the Alternative Digital Song Sales chart.)	—	— (Note: "Oh No!!!" did not enter the Hot Rock & Alternative Songs chart, but peaked at number 22 on the Rock Digital Song Sales chart.)		A Modern Tragedy Vol. 3
"Happy Pill" (with Moby Rich)	2019	—	—	—	—	—	—	—		Non-album single
"Peaches (Text Voter XX to 40649)" (with K.Flay)	2020	—	—	—	—	—	—	—		Text Voter XX to 40649 Collection
"Whole Lotta (Text Voter XX to 40649)" (with DREAMERS)	2020	—	—	—	—	—	—	—		Text Voter XX to 40649 Collection
"How Bout Now (Text Voter XX to 40649)" (with phem)	2020	—	—	—	—	—	—	—		Text Voter XX to 40649 Collection
"Again (Text Voter XX to 40649)" (with Zero 9:36)	2020	—	—	—	—	—	—	—		Text Voter XX to 40649 Collection
"Identity"	2020	—	—	—	—	—	—	—		Death of an Optimist
"Riptide"	2020	—	—	—	—	—	—	—		Death of an Optimist
"Dirty"	2020	50	6	—	—	10	—	— (Note: "Dirty" did not enter the Hot Rock & Alternative Songs chart, but peaked at number 22 on the Rock & Alternative Airplay chart.)	MC: Gold	Death of an Optimist
"One Step Closer"	2020	—	—	—	—	—	—	—		Spotify Singles
"We Did It!!!"	2020	—	—	—	—	—	—	—		Death of an Optimist
"Zen" (with X Ambassadors and K.Flay)	2020	—	9	48	—	24	—	— (Note: "Zen" did not enter the Hot Rock & Alternative Songs chart, but peaked at number 43 on the Rock & Alternative Airplay chart.)		Non-album single
"Rain" (with Jessie Reyez)	2021	—	31	—	—	26	—	49		The Suicide Squad (Original Motion Picture Soundtrack)
"Drop Dead" (with Kesha and Travis Barker)	2021	—	46	—	—	—	—	—		Non-album singles (Note: The solo version of "Drop Dead" is included as an album track on Death of an Optimist, while the remix featuring Kesha and Travis Barker isn't.)
"Kult" (with Steve Aoki featuring Jasiah)	2022	—	—	—	—	—	—	—		Non-album singles
"Eulogy"	2023	—	14	—	—	—	—	—		I Love You, I'm Trying
"Drones"	2023	—	—	—	—	—	—	—		I Love You, I'm Trying
"Something To Hide"	2023	—	13	—	—	—	—	—		I Love You, I'm Trying
"One Last Dance" (with Tom Morello featuring Roman Morello)	2024	—	—	—	—	—	34	—		Venom: The Last Dance
"Brainrot"	2025	—	—	—	—	—	—	—		Inertia
"Self Immolation"	2025	—	—	—	—	—	—	—		Inertia
"God Is An Animal"	2025	—	—	—	—	—	—	—		Inertia
"Autonomous Delivery Robot"	2025	—	—	—	—	—	—	—		Inertia
"—" denotes a single that did not chart or was not released in that territory.

=== As featured artist ===
List of singles, with selected chart positions, showing year released and album name
Title	Year	Peak chart positions	Album
Title	Year	US Alt	Album
"Running from My Shadow" (Mike Shinoda featuring Grandson)	2018	—	Post Traumatic
"All in My Head" (Whethan featuring Grandson)	2020	—	Fantasy
"Heat Seeker" (DREAMERS featuring Grandson)	2020	28	Palm Reader
"Lost Cause" (KennyHoopla featuring Grandson)	2020	—	Non-album singles
"Cash Machine (Remix)" (Oliver Tree featuring Dillon Francis and Grandson)	2020	—	Non-album singles
"Hold the Line" (Tom Morello featuring Grandson)	2021	—	The Atlas Underground Fire
"Until I Come Home" (Two Feet featuring Grandson)	2021	—	Shape & Form
"Good Mood" (DE'WAYNE featuring Grandson)	2022	—	Non-album singles
"Choke" (The Warning featuring Grandson & Zero 9:36)	2022	—	Non-album singles
"—" denotes a single that did not chart or was not released in that territory.

=== Music videos ===
Title	Year	Director(s)
"Bills"	2017	Joe Cappa
"Blood // Water"	2018	Miggy & Morgan
"6:00"	2018	Gus Black
"Apologize"	2019	Jordan Wozy & Lucas Taggart
"Stigmata"	2019	Rosco Guerrero
"Rock Bottom"	2019	Seth Michael Stern
"Oh No!!!"	2019	Galileo
"Identity"	2020	Karl Jungquist
"Riptide"	2020	Karl Jungquist
"Dirty"	2020	Karl Jungquist
"Rain" (From The Suicide Squad)	2021	~
"Drop Dead" (ft. Kesha and Travis Barker)	2021	Andrew Sandler
"Eulogy"	2023	Zach Madden
"Drones"	2023	Zachary Bailey
"Half My Heart"	2023	~
"Brainrot"	2025	Joe Weil
"Self Immolation"	2025	Joe Weil
"God Is An Animal"	2025	Joe Weil
"Autonomous Delivery Robot"	2025	Joe Weil
"Masters Of War"	2025	~
"Little White Lies"	2026	~

== Tours ==
=== Headlining ===
- No Apologies Tour (2019)
- The End of the Beginning Tour (2019–2020)
- Death of a Tour (2022)
- I Love You, I'm Trying Tour (2023)
- Summer Rage Tour (2024)
- Inertia Tour (2025)

=== Supporting ===
- The Glorious Sons - Young Beauties and Fools Tour (2017)
- Hobo Johnson - 2018 Summer Tour
- Nothing but Thieves - Broken Machine World Tour (2018)
- Imagine Dragons - Mercury World Tour (2022)
- Avril Lavigne - Bite Me Tour (2022)
- Linkin Park - From Zero World Tour (2025)
