= Blood // Water =

2017 single by Grandson

Single by Grandson

from the album A Modern Tragedy Vol. 1
- Released: October 27, 2017
- Recorded: July–August 2017
- Genre: Rap rock; hard rock
- Length: 3:35
- Label: Atlantic; Fueled by Ramen
- Songwriter: Jordan Edward Benjamin

Grandson singles chronology
"War" (2017)	"Blood // Water" (2017)	"Overdose" (2018)

Music video
- "Blood // Water" on YouTube

"Blood // Water" is a song by American-Canadian musician Grandson. It was released on 27 October 2017 as the lead single from Grandson's first extended play, A Modern Tragedy Vol. 1, through the Fueled by Ramen label. The song is featured in EA Sports' NHL 19.

== Background ==
The official audio video was released on Grandson's YouTube channel on October 27, 2017.

== Composition and lyrics ==
Gil Kaufman described the song as a "pop-spiked take on Rage Against the Machine's activist rap-rock". The song is performed in a G-sharp minor. The song has a tempo of 154 beats per minute.

In a May 2019 interview with Radio.com, Grandson described the lyrics of "Blood // Water" as "the first shot from a personal revolution, and it has been growing ever since. In the grand raw tradition of activist rock, grandson cut through the chaotic culture, urging people to pay attention."

== Live performances ==
On August 15, 2018, the first live television performance of "Blood // Water" aired on the US talk show Late Night With Seth Meyers. Billboard magazine described the performance as an anti-capitalist anthem where "complacency is not an option".

== Music video ==
The music video for "Blood // Water" was released on June 4, 2018, to coincide with the announcement of his debut extended play, A Modern Tragedy Vol. 1. Alex Darus of Alternative Press described the music video as "[referencing the] 1950s nuclear family idea and [juxtaposing] them with images of politicians profiting off problems such as prescription drug abuse."

== Track listings ==
Digital download
No.	Title	Length
1.	"Blood // Water"	3:36

Digital download – remix
No.	Title	Length
1.	"Blood // Water" (Awolnation remix)	3:48

Blood // Edits EP
No.	Title	Length
1.	"Blood // Water" (Awolnation remix)	3:46
2.	"Blood // Water" (Tom Morello remix)	3:33
3.	"Blood // Water" (Krupa remix)	3:42
4.	"Blood // Water" (King Kavalier remix)	2:59
5.	"Blood // Water" (22 Bullets & Ghost remix)	3:18

== Charts ==
=== Weekly charts ===
Weekly chart performance for "Blood // Water"
Chart (2017–18)	Peak position
Canada Rock (Billboard)	19
US Hot Rock & Alternative Songs (Billboard)	19
US Rock & Alternative Airplay (Billboard)	25

=== Year-end charts ===
Year-end chart performance for "Blood // Water"
Chart (2018)	Position
US Hot Rock Songs (Billboard)	48

== Certifications ==
Certifications for "Blood // Water"
Region	Certification	Certified units/sales
Australia (ARIA)	2× Platinum	140,000^{‡}
Austria (IFPI Austria)	Platinum	30,000^{‡}
Brazil (Pro-Música Brasil)	Platinum	40,000^{‡}
Canada (Music Canada)	3× Platinum	240,000^{‡}
France (SNEP)	Gold	100,000^{‡}
Germany (BVMI)	Gold	200,000^{‡}
New Zealand (RMNZ)	Platinum	30,000^{‡}
Poland (ZPAV)	2× Platinum	100,000^{‡}
Portugal (AFP)	Gold	5,000^{‡}
United Kingdom (BPI)	Gold	400,000^{‡}
United States (RIAA)	2× Platinum	2,000,000^{‡}
^{‡} Sales+streaming figures based on certification alone.

== See also ==
- Nuclear family
- Death of an Optimist
