= Dead Poet Society =

American rock band

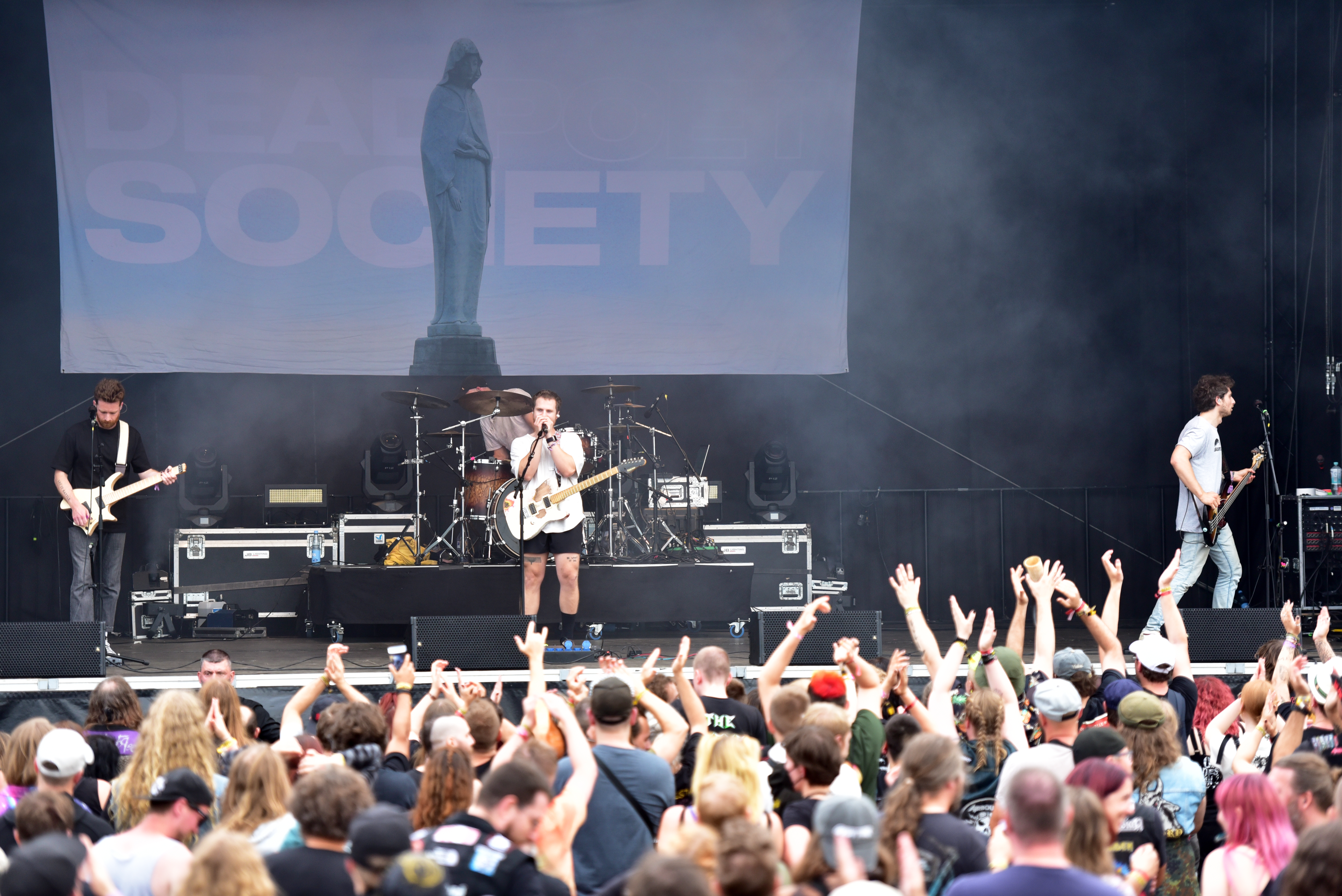
- Dead Poet Society in 2024; From left: Jack Collins, Will Goodroad, Jack Underkofler and Dylan Brenner

Background information
- Origin: Boston, Massachusetts, U.S.
- Genres: Alternative rock; blues rock; indie rock; garage rock
- Years active: 2013–present
- Label: Spinefarm
- Members: Jack Underkofler; Jack Collins; Dylan Brenner; Will Goodroad
- Past members: Nick Taylor
- Website: wearedps.com

Dead Poet Society is an American rock band formed in Boston, Massachusetts in 2013.

== History ==
The band was formed in 2013 by Jack Underkofler (vocals, guitar), Jack Collins (guitar), Nick Taylor (bass guitar) and Will Goodroad (drums). Dylan Brenner replaced Nick Taylor on bass in 2019. The band started off as an independent group, self-producing and self-recording their songs before signing to Spinefarm Records in 2020. They released their debut album -!- in 2021. In a 2016 interview with Beyond the Stage magazine, frontman Jack Underkofler described the band's sound as "heavy indie rock" and "djent pop", contrasting heavy, down-tuned guitar riffs with soft, pop-adjacent choruses and verses.

The band was formed in 2013 while the members were attending the Berklee College of Music. As they played their first concert two days after their founding, they needed to come up with a name. They chose "Dead Poet Society", unrelated to the film Dead Poets Society. After graduation, the band moved to Los Angeles. In 2016, their music was discovered by the influential Mexican blog Pepe Problemas. Their review caught the attention of another up-and-coming rock band, Sputnik, who invited the band to open for them on their national tour of Mexico. Over the following two years, the band toured Mexico another seven times, building a strong fan base. Their US break came in 2019 when Andrés asked them to open on his national tour. Later that year, they opened for Badflower which established their notability in the US.

They are expected to tour with Chevelle in 2026. They released their third album, Monarch, in October 2026, followed by a co-headlining tour in the US with Honey Revenge. The latter part of the Honey Revenge tour was subsequently rescheduled to allow Dead Poet Society to perform as the opening act for Muse on their The Wow! Signal European tour in November 2026.

== Musical style ==
AllMusic described the band's music as "dark alternative hard rock" and "progressive" indie rock. The site writes the band's music was "rooted in angst and outrage at the world and themselves." Lyrical themes explored by the band include personal development.

== Discography ==
=== Albums ===
- -!- (2021)
- Fission (2024)
- Monarch (2026)

=== EPs ===
- Haviland (2013)
- Weapons (2013)
- Axiom (2015)
- Dempsey (2016)

=== Singles ===
List of singles, with selected chart positions, showing year released and album name
Title	Year	Peak chart positions				Album
Title	Year	US Main. Rock	US Hard Rock	US Alt. Air.	US Air.	Album
".CoDA."	2020	19	—	—	50	-!-
".intoodeep."	2020	28	—	—	—	-!-
"Running In Circles" / "HURT" (original or featuring The Warning)	2023	9	—	—	27	Fission
"Running In Circles" / "HURT" (original or featuring The Warning)	2023	8	15	—	25	Fission
"How could I love you?" / "I hope you hate me."	2023	—	—	—	—	Fission
"81 Tonnes"	2023	—	—	—	—	Fission
"My Condition"	2024	—	—	28	—	Fission
"Sinner Systems"	2026	—	—	—	—	Monarch
"Roach"	2026	—	—	—	—	Monarch
"Cold"	2026	10	—	38	36	Monarch
"Miami For the Weekend"	2026	—	—	—	—	Monarch

== Music videos ==
List of music videos, showing year released and directors
Title	Year	Director(s)
"Lo Air"	2016	Dead Poet Society
"Bacalar"	2017	Dead Poet Society
"American Blood"	2018	Kevin Hayeland
".swvrm."	2019	Dead Poet Society
".intoodeep."	2020	Jordan Wolfbauer and Dead Poet Society
".CoDA."	2020	Jordan Wolfbauer and Dead Poet Society
"I Never Loved Myself Like I Loved You"	2021	Dead Poet Society
".SALT."	2022	Dead Poet Society
"Running In Circles" / "HURT" (version one)	2023	Edward Curran
"I Hope You Hate Me"	2023	Edward Curran
"How Could I Love You?"	2023	Edward Curran
"My Condition"	2024	Steven Mertens
"HURT" (version two) (featuring The Warning)	2025	Edward Curran
"Sinner Systems"	2026	Darren Craig and Mindreader
"Roach"	2026	Mindreader and Jack Underkofler
"Cold"	2026	Jack Underkofler and Alex Kouvastos
