= Daniela Villarreal =

Mexican musician (born 2000)

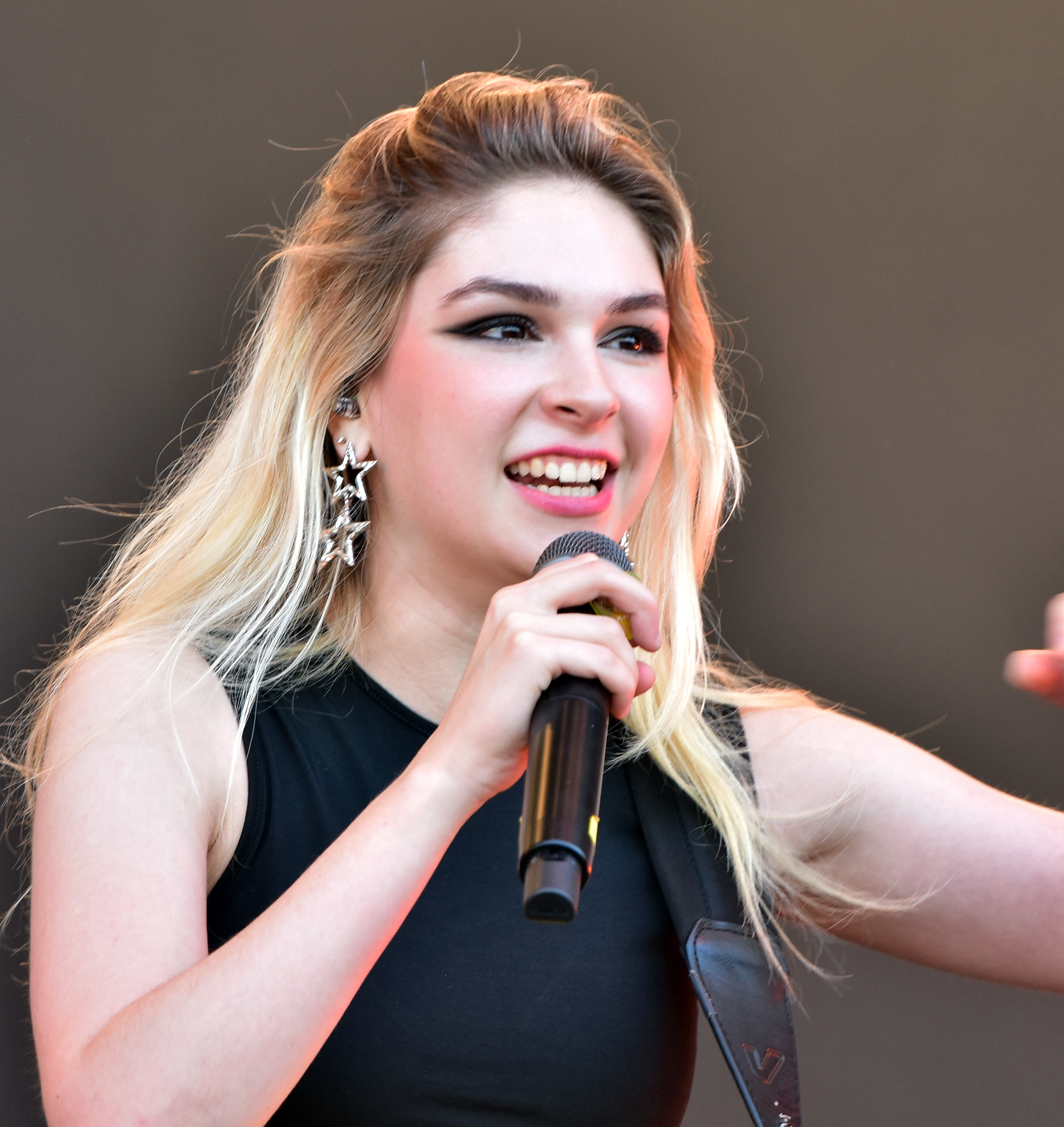
- Villarreal in 2024

Background information
- Also known as: Dany
- Born: Daniela Villarreal Vélez; 30 January 2000 (age 26); San Pedro Garza García, Nuevo León, Mexico
- Genres: Hard rock; alternative rock; alternative metal
- Occupations: Guitarist; vocalist; songwriter
- Instruments: Guitar; vocals
- Years active: 2013–present
- Member of: The Warning

Daniela Villarreal Vélez (born 30 January 2000) is a Mexican musician who is the lead vocalist and guitarist of the rock band The Warning, alongside sisters Paulina Villarreal and Alejandra Villarreal.

== Life and career ==
Daniela Villarreal was born in San Pedro Monterrey, Mexico. She went to a bilingual high school (Liceo de Monterrey Redwood) making her fluent in English.

From her early childhood she was taught classical piano, and later guitar and – in her school – saxophone.

In 2013, the Villarreal sisters formed their band, The Warning, where she is the lead singer, a songwriter and the band's sole guitarist.

Villarreal developed a distinctive guitar style characterized by heavy riffs, distorted and fuzz-based tones, and expressive lead guitar passages. She has cited David Gilmour as an influence on her playing, particularly in his ability to convey emotion through the guitar. She has also said that she prefers guitar solos to have a specific musical purpose rather than using them routinely in songs.

Villarreal's vocal style combines aggressive rock singing with softer and more airy passages. She has described the band's earlier vocal approach as centered on an "angry screaming" style, but said that while recording Keep Me Fed (2024) she experimented more with vocal dynamics and different textures, including softer and airier singing alongside her screams. She described the process as helping her further develop as a singer as well as a guitarist.

Villarreal shares songwriting duties with her sisters. The band's songs are generally developed collaboratively, with Villarreal responsible for incorporating guitar riffs, rhythm and lead parts while ensuring they can be performed live with a single guitarist. She has described taking a melodic approach to guitar solos, often beginning by singing or humming a melody before translating it to guitar.

In January 2025, Villarreal, a PRS sponsored artist, performed two songs at the PRS 40th anniversary event and received a 40th anniversary guitar from Paul Reed Smith himself. At the same event, Orianthi Panagaris gifted her own PRS signature-series guitar to Daniela.

In November 2025, Billy Idol celebrated his 70th birthday on a concert in Mexico City. Villarreal was invited to the stage for a joint performance of "Dancing with Myself".

== Equipment ==
Villarreal is an official PRS featured artist, and as such, owns and plays various models of this brand including a PRS Custom 24-08, a 40th Anniversary Pearl PRS, and a Lotus Bloom Private Stock PRS gifted to her by Orianthi. In 2026, PRS unveiled their Daniela Villarreal signature model: the Astryx Limited Edition.

She also uses a Gibson Explorer gifted to her by Lzzy Hale of Halestorm, and a mustard-yellow Manson ORYX VI given to her by Matt Bellamy of Muse. Villarreal also uses a Fender Baritone Stratocaster extensively used on the album Keep Me Fed.

== Recognition ==
In 2025, Guitar World named Villarreal one of its guitarists of the year. She appeared on the cover of the magazine's year-end issue as part of a collage featuring the honorees, alongside other selected guitarists. The magazine highlighted her unconventional guitar tunings and their contribution to The Warning's riff-oriented sound.
