= Paulina Villarreal =

Mexican musician (born 2002)

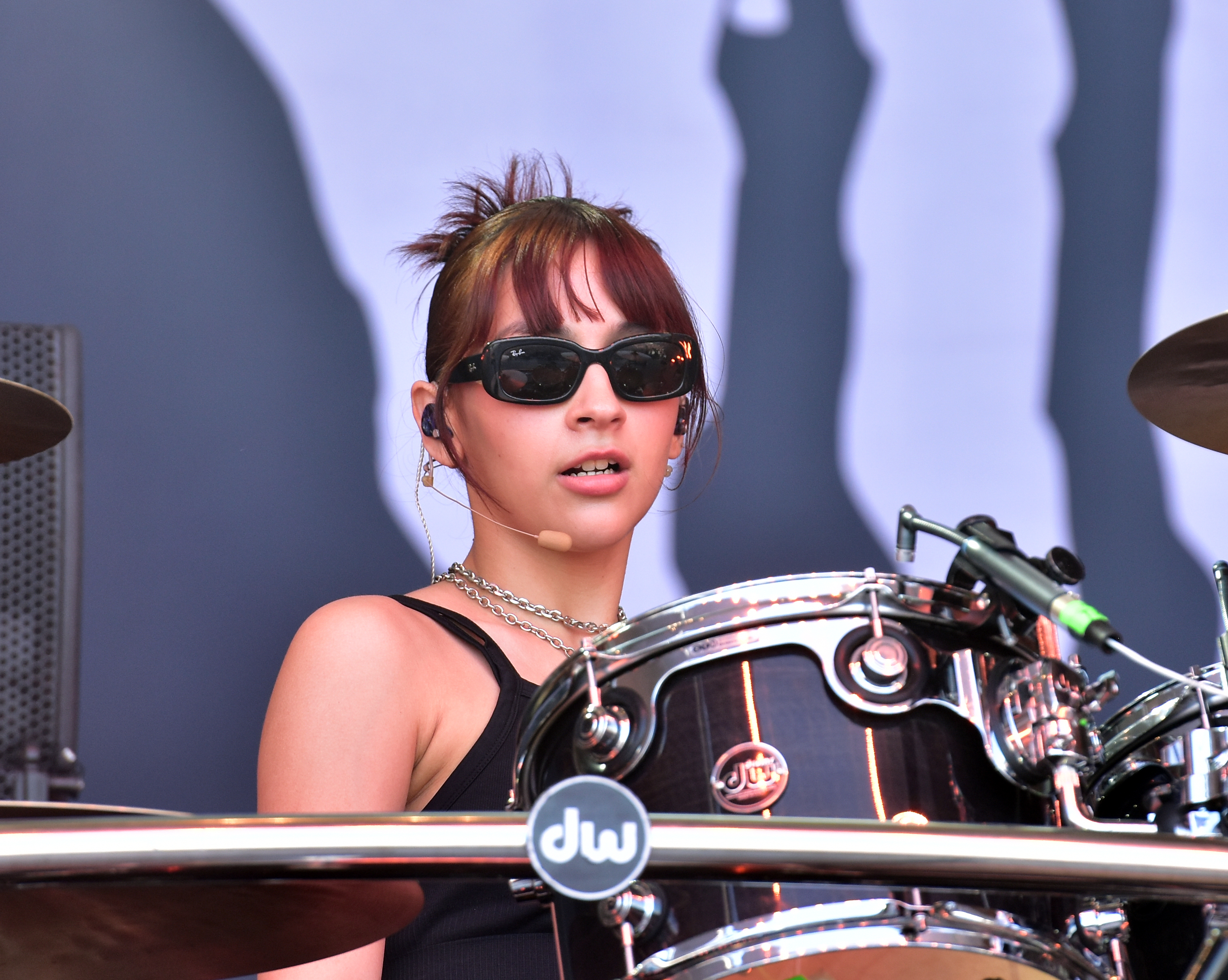
- Villarreal in 2024

Background information
- Also known as: Pau
- Born: Paulina Villarreal Vélez; 5 February 2002 (age 24); San Pedro Garza García, Nuevo León, Mexico
- Genre: Hard rock
- Occupations: Drummer; songwriter; singer
- Instruments: Drums; vocals; piano
- Years active: 2013–present
- Labels: Lava; Republic
- Member of: The Warning

Paulina Villarreal Vélez (born 5 February 2002) is a Mexican musician who is the drummer of the rock band The Warning. Alongside her sisters in the band, she also sings and plays piano.

== Life and career ==
Villarreal was born in San Pedro Monterrey, Mexico. She went to a bilingual high school (Liceo de Monterrey Redwood) making her fluent in English.

From her early childhood she was taught classical piano, and began drum lessons at the age of six. Her parents' passion and her playing the video game Rock Band led Paulina to rock music. Her father uploaded multiple videos to YouTube in which she played drum covers of well-known pop and rock hits. Neil Peart was the biggest influence on her drumming style.

In 2013, the Villarreal sisters formed The Warning. In addition to drumming, Paulina occasionally provides lead vocals. In 2014, Villarreal was profiled in the women's drumming publication Tom Tom Magazine at age 12. Also during this year, Kirk Hammett of Metallica saw a video of her and her sisters playing a cover of Metallica's "Enter Sandman", which led Hammett to praise Paulina's drumming in a tweet.

In 2015, after the "Enter Sandman" video went viral, Villarreal and her sisters were invited to The Ellen Show as musical guests. Ellen DeGeneres supported them with a financial donation that helped the sisters get a scholarship to attend Berkelee College of Music's five-week program – with an age waiver, because the required entry age level for this program was 14. By that time, Villarreal was already writing her lyrics and music, and the band's first EP was recorded and released in 2015.

In 2018, Villarreal was one of the judges of the Hit Like a Girl international drumming contest for female percussionists. She also performed on this contest's awards show, with Faith Benson (Hit Like a Girl 2017 champion), as a drum duo. In 2021, she was featured on the cover of Latin Drummers magazine. In April 2022, she was invited to teach a Drum and Composition masterclass at the Sound:Check Xpo event in Mexico.

In 2024, Villarreal debuted as an artistic director by creating and directing the official video for the song "Qué Más Quieres". In April 2026, she was featured on the cover of Modern Drummer's magazine.

== As frontwoman ==
Although Villarreal usually sings while at the drums, she sometimes acts as frontwoman. She did this singing "Narcisista" at Teatro Metropolitan in 2022 (with her drum teacher, Beto Ramos, as a guest drummer) and singing "Consume" at Auditorio Nacional in 2025. She also sang lead on some songs with Argentinian band Eruca Sativa, when they and The Warning toured together. In 2024, Villarreal sang with Dead Poet Society at the Aftershock Festival.

== Equipment ==
Villarreal plays DW Performance Series drums. She uses a Ludwig Black Beauty snare drum, and a DW rack – custom modified for her body size. She is officially sponsored by Sabian, and currently uses the HHX series cymbals. She uses Roland MIDI pedals and a laptop computer with Ableton to control the timing of the band's live show, additional instrumentation, and certain stage visuals. In some songs, such as "More", Villarreal uses a cowbell.

== Awards ==
Villarreal won two categories of Modern Drummer Readers Poll: the "Up and Coming" category (in 2023) and the "Rock" category (in 2025). Drumeo presented her the Rock Drummer of the Year award in February 2024.

In March 2024, she received the Decididas Global Award at the 2024 Decididas Summit (a forum for women by women that seeks to empower and enhance the importance of women in science, film, medicine, finance, etc.), for "transcending borders and inspire us to dream BIG". She was honored for her contribution to the Mexican music industry and society, and for standing out as an exemplary leader who seeks to inspire more young women to pursue their dreams. Upon receiving the award Villarreal said: "When they told me about this recognition, the first thing I felt was insecurity and intimidation, doctors, astronauts and engineers came here, and I said 'I'm a drummer', but my mother explained to me that what I do has an impact on the lives of others".

In June 2024, Villarreal was chosen to be included in The 100 Most Powerful Women in Mexico by the Mexican edition of Forbes magazine.

== Personal life ==
Paulina is the middle of the three Villarreal sisters of the Mexican rock band The Warning, alongside Daniela and Alejandra. Villarreal has mentioned in interviews that she is interested in finance and plans to study the field.

She likes fantasy books, anime, and manga, which inspire her in writing music and lyrics.

In a 2024 interview, Villarreal said she had been diagnosed as an adult with an attention deficit that she had not previously known about, and credited her parents enrolling her in drum lessons as a child with helping her manage it.
