= The Warning (band) =

Mexican rock band

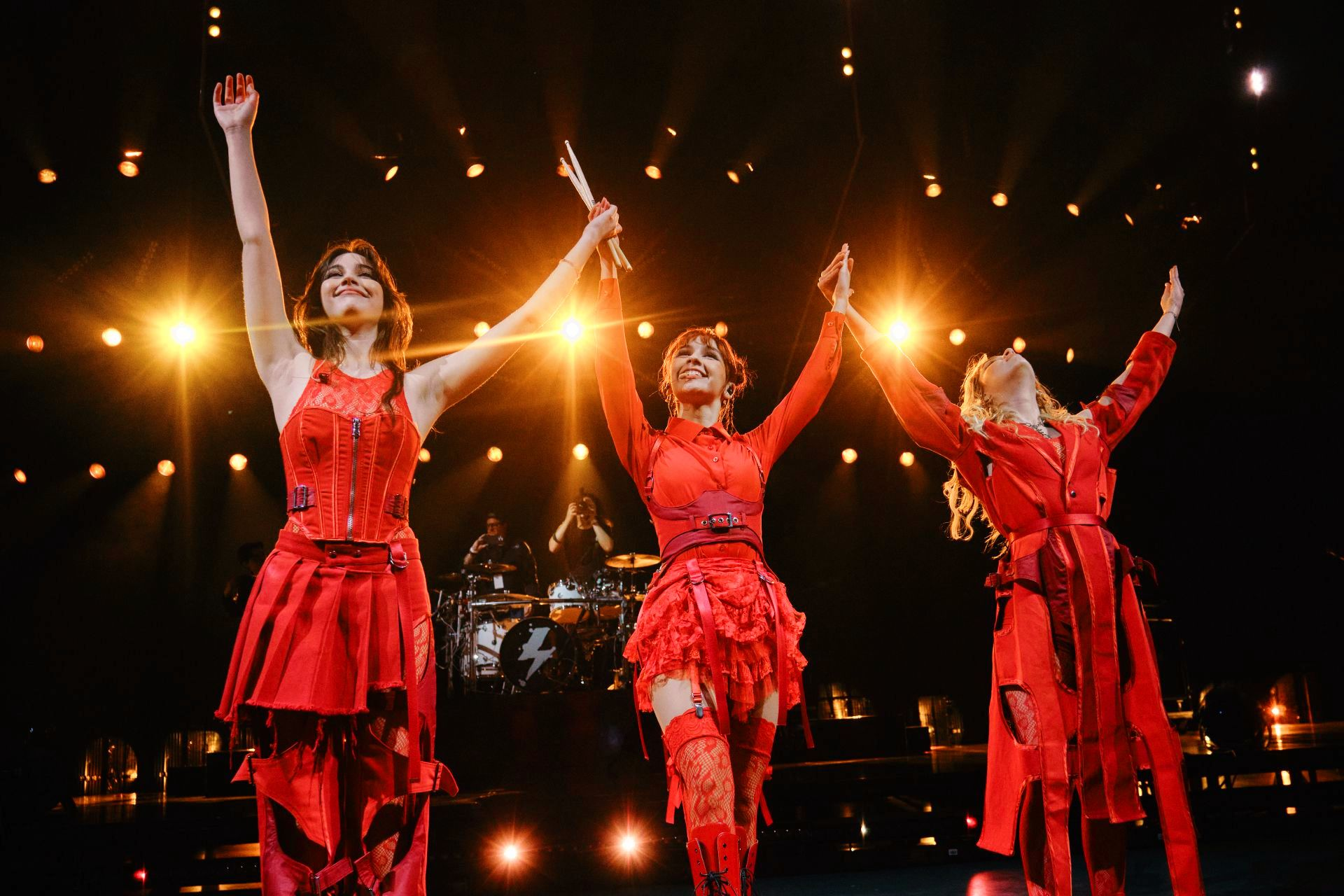
- The Warning at the Auditorio Nacional in 2025 (L–R: Alejandra, Paulina, and Daniela Villarreal Vélez)

Background information
- Origin: Monterrey, Nuevo León, Mexico
- Genres: Hard rock; heavy metal; alternative metal; alternative rock
- Years active: 2013–present
- Labels: Lava; Republic; Nada Más
- Publisher: UMPG
- Members: Daniela Villarreal Vélez; Paulina Villarreal Vélez; Alejandra Villarreal Vélez
- Website: www.thewarningband.com

The Warning is a Mexican rock band from Monterrey, formed in 2013 by the Villarreal Vélez sisters: Daniela (guitar, vocals, piano), Paulina (drums, vocals, piano), and Alejandra (bass guitar, backing vocals, piano). They have released five studio albums, one live album, two EPs, and 18 music videos. In 2026, their single "Kerosene" topped Billboard's Mainstream Rock Airplay chart, making The Warning the first all-women band and the first Mexican band to reach number one in the chart's 45-year history.

== History ==
=== 2013–2014: Early years ===
The Villarreal Vélez sisters were raised in Monterrey, and all received training on piano and various instruments at an early age. Thanks to encouragement from their parents and often playing the video game Rock Band, the sisters decided to pursue rock music. Daniela and Paulina selected guitar and drums as their primary instruments, respectively. After the youngest of the three, Alejandra, selected bass guitar as her primary instrument at about age 7, the sisters decided to form a power trio in 2013. They learned to play rock songs and posted videos of their performances to YouTube.

In 2014, 12-year-old Paulina was profiled in the women's drumming publication Tom Tom Magazine. The band first gained widespread notice later in 2014 when, at ages 9 through 14, their YouTube video in which they performed Metallica's "Enter Sandman" went viral among rock fans, eventually earning more than 26 million views. The video received attention from Metallica guitarist Kirk Hammett, who offered particular praise for Paulina, saying, "The drummer kicks maximum ass!"

=== 2015–2020: As independent artists ===
Due to the recognition gained from their "Enter Sandman" video and encouragement from Alejandra's bass teacher (Pablo González Sarre of Los Claxons), The Warning decided to seek a record deal and develop their own songs. The band raised money through a GoFundMe appeal to record the six-song EP, Escape the Mind, released in 2015. During production of the EP, the band met producer Jake Carmona, who went on to contribute to Escape the Mind and their next two albums.

In April 2015, the band appeared on The Ellen DeGeneres Show. During this period, the sisters raised funds, including a $10,000 donation each from DeGeneres and the Target Corporation, to attend a five-week training program at Berklee College of Music in the United States. They also gave two presentations at the TEDx conference at the University of Nevada, one in 2016 and one in 2017. The band was known for being inspired by the Rock Band video game series early in their history, so the game's designers returned the favor by including two songs by The Warning in Rock Band 4.

The Warning's first full-length album, XXI Century Blood, was released in 2017. The music video for the title track won several awards at film festivals. During this period, they were invited to perform at the Mother of All Rock Festival in Monterrey, and also opened a show for the Killers in that city.

Their second album, Queen of the Murder Scene, was released in 2018. In 2019, The Warning performed at Rock al Parque, the biggest rock festival in Latin America. At the end of 2019, they announced an extensive upcoming tour throughout North America, though it was canceled due to the COVID-19 pandemic.

=== 2020–present: With Lava and Republic Records ===
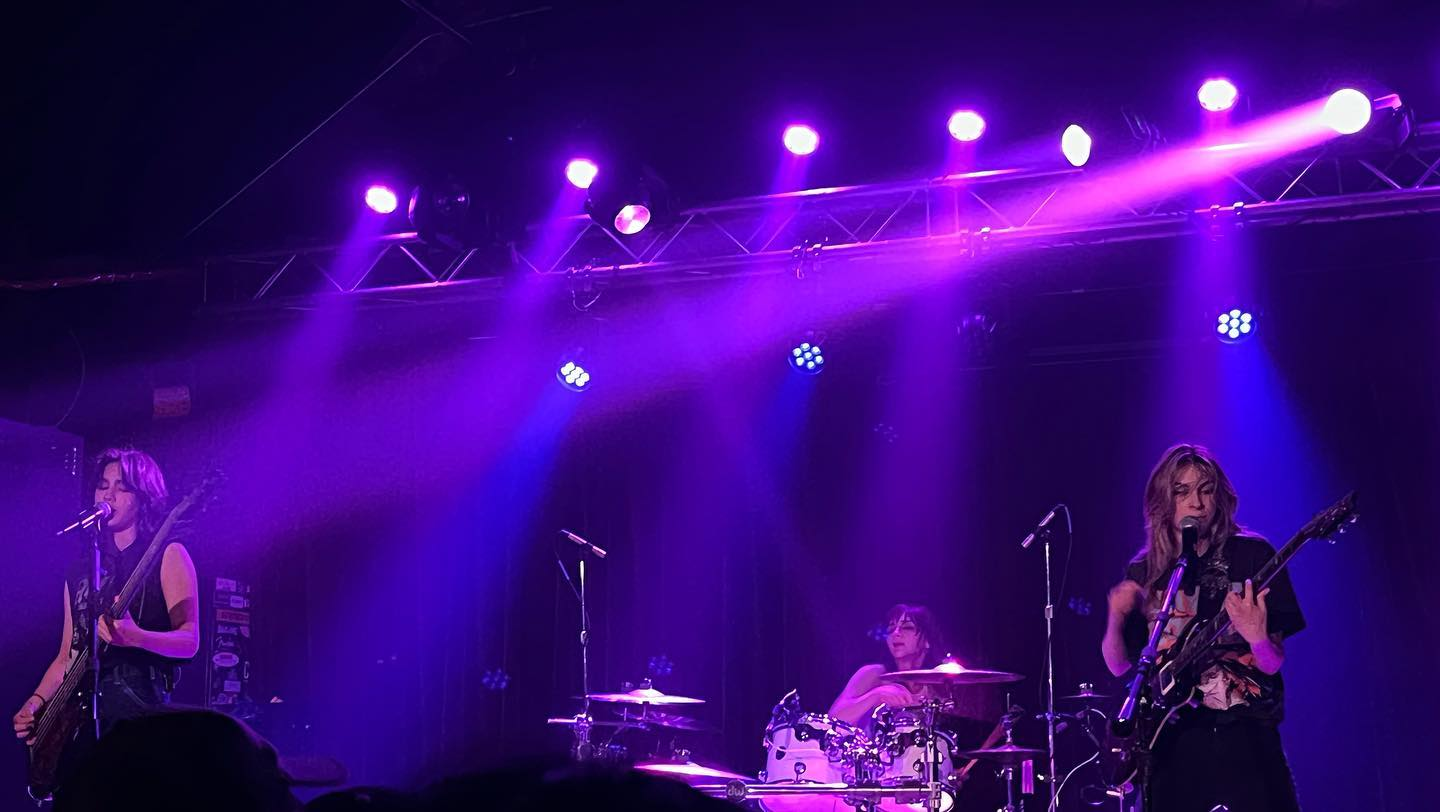
The Warning performing in Boston in 2022.

In August 2020, The Warning signed a five-album deal with Lava Records and began work on a new album with producer David Bendeth. The song, "Choke", was released in May 2021. Later that year, The Warning appeared on the Metallica tribute album, The Metallica Blacklist, performing another cover of "Enter Sandman", this time with singer Alessia Cara. This version of the song was featured as the background music for the video game Marvel's Midnight Suns and the Netflix series The Imperfects.

The six-song EP Mayday was released in October 2021, and The Warning embarked on a tour of North America in early 2022, performing more than 30 dates as headliners plus opening for Foo Fighters, Sammy Hagar and the Circle, and Stone Temple Pilots.

They released the single "Money" in March 2022, and the song reached number 31 on the Billboard Mainstream Rock Airplay chart.

==== Error ====
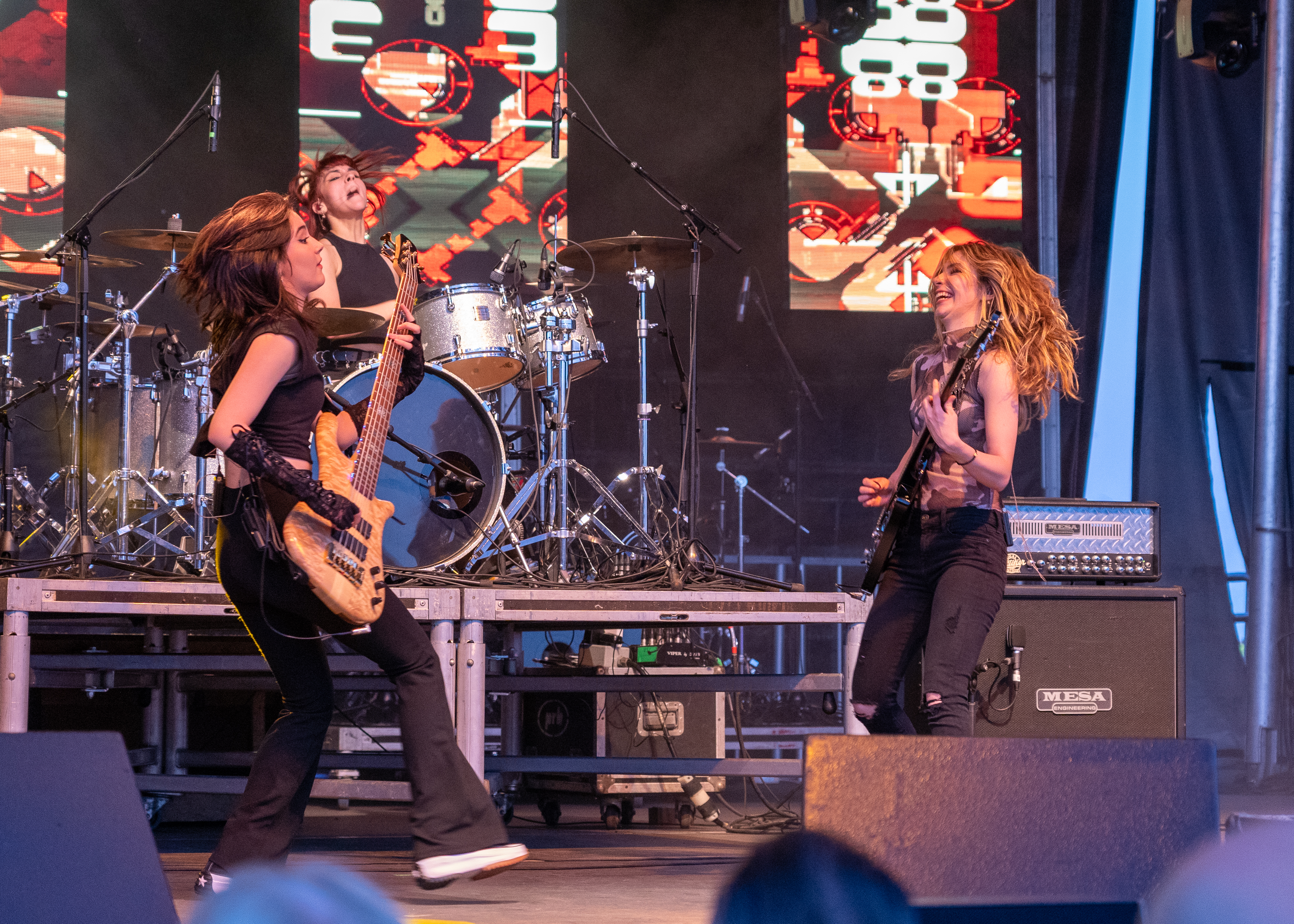
The Warning performing at the Sound of Music in Burlington, Ontario in 2022.

The band's third studio album, Error, comprising the six tracks from the Mayday EP plus "Money" and seven new songs, was released in June 2022. In July, they embarked on a U.S. tour supporting Halestorm and the Pretty Reckless and appearing at festivals like Burlington's Sound of Music Festival, Iceberg Alley, Summerfest, and Upheaval, before resuming their headlining tour in August. Later that year, they toured Canada while supporting Three Days Grace and opened a show for Guns N' Roses in their home city of Monterrey, Mexico.

In the first half of 2023, the band supported Muse during several dates on the Will of the People World Tour in both Mexico and Europe. It was The Warning's first visit to Europe. In September 2023, they performed at the MTV Video Music Awards and, in the same month, they opened one show for Guns N' Roses during the We're F'N' Back! Tour. In October, the band celebrated their 10th anniversary with a concert at the Pepsi Center in Mexico City.

In May 2023, they released the first new single, "More", from their upcoming album. In spring 2024, they released five more singles from the upcoming album: "Sick", "Hell You Call a Dream", "Qué Más Quieres", "Automatic Sun", and "Burnout". The official music video for "Qué Más Quieres" debuted on MTV Live. The release of "Automatic Sun" coincided with the 2024 solar eclipse. In April 2024, they completed a second concert tour of Europe, this time as the headliner; all 19 stops of the tour were sold out. In June 2024, The Warning completed a Japanese tour at the invitation of Band-Maid.

==== Keep Me Fed ====
The band's fourth studio album, Keep Me Fed, including the six singles and six new tracks, was released on 28 June 2024. Promoting their album release, The Warning appeared on Jimmy Kimmel Live. In July, The Warning was featured as artists of the month on MTV Push – a promotional event that includes exclusive videos of them performing songs and also interviews.

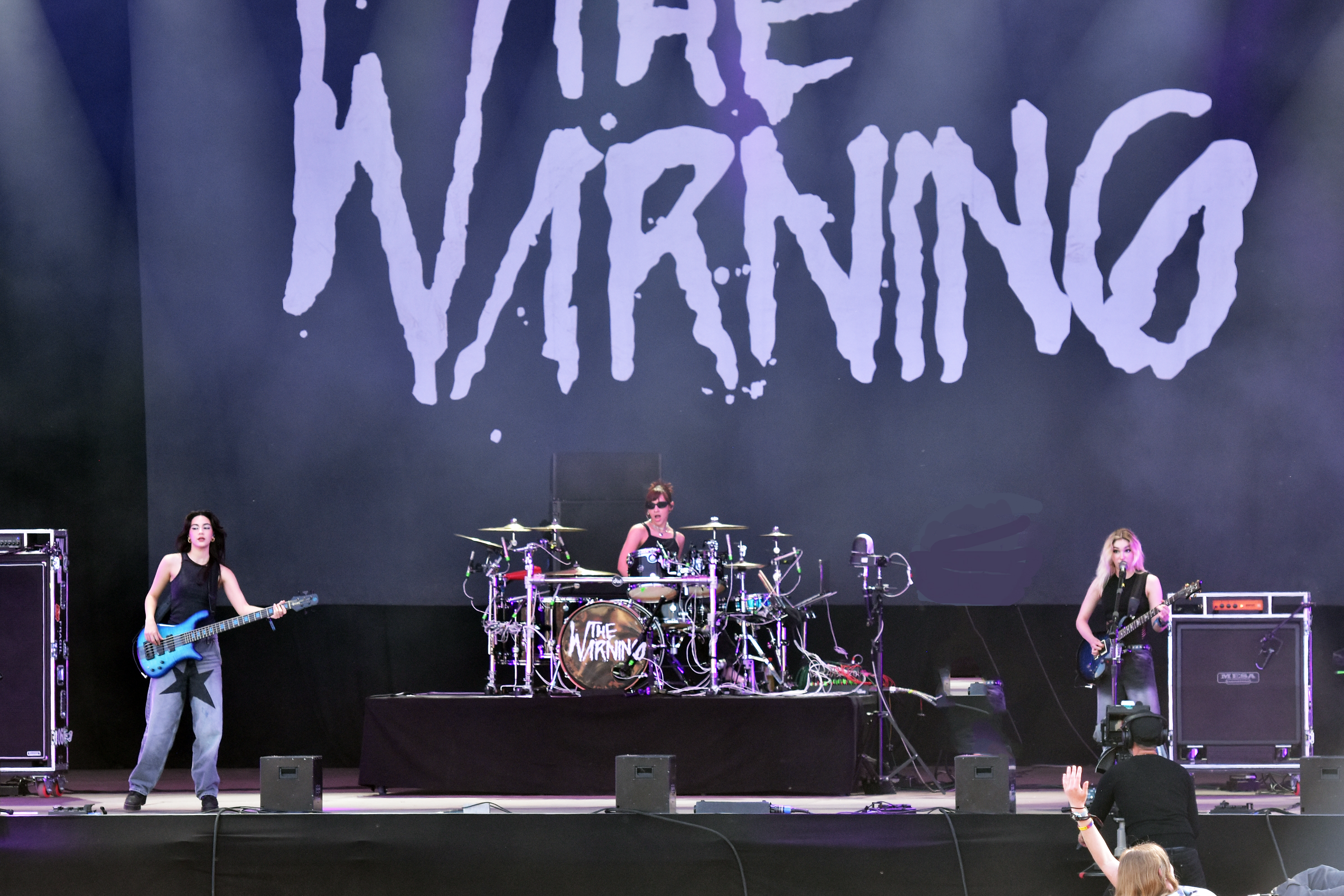
The Warning performing at Wacken Open Air in Wacken, Schleswig-Holstein in 2024.

During the summer, the band toured Europe again, including Wacken Open Air and Pol'and'Rock. The song "Show Them", a collaboration with Band-Maid recorded during the Japanese tour, was released as a joint single in August 2024 and included on Band-Maid's album Epic Narratives, released the following month. In September and October, they went on an extensive North American tour to support Keep Me Fed. In November 2024, The Warning performed at the MTV Europe Music Awards and a few days later, at the 25th Annual Latin Grammy Awards.

On 12 December 2024, The Warning released the single, "Hurt", a collaboration with Dead Poet Society. This came about after Paulina joined the Massachusetts-based band on stage for a performance of the song at the Aftershock Festival in California earlier in the year. At the end of the year, The Warning appeared on the French TV show, Taratata.

In spring of 2025, the band started a new leg of their Keep Me Fed tour, including three sold-out nights at Auditorio Nacional in Mexico City, with one being recorded for a live album and film. They also toured in South America and Europe. The band later joined Halsey as an opening act for part of the singer's North American For My Last Trick tour. During the summer, they performed at several European rock festivals such as Sweden Rock, Rock im Park and Rock am Ring (where they joined Dead Poet Society again on stage), Nova Rock, and Pinkpop. The band toured further in the United States in summer 2025, and they wrapped up their 2025 schedule in August at the Pachuca Rock Fest in Mexico.

The band's first concert film Live from Auditorio Nacional, CDMX was released in theaters in August 2025. The band performed together with Billy Idol and Steve Stevens on stage at CBS's Grammy Celebration of Latin Music December 2025, playing a mash-up of "La Bamba" and "Twist and Shout". At the beginning of 2026, they collaborated with Grammy-winning artist Carín León on the single, "Love to Be Loved".

==== Everything's Falling ====
In March 2026, The Warning released the first new single, "Kerosene", in May the second one, "Ego", and in June the third, "Ritual" from their upcoming album, Everything's Falling, which was released on 28 August 2026. During the spring and summer of 2026, the band went on a major UK and U.S. tour, supporting Yungblud.

In May 2026, the band was signed by United Talent Agency for representation in the United States, Mexico and South America. For the charts starting in September 2026, "Kerosene" reached number one on Billboard's Mainstream Rock Airplay chart, making The Warning the first all-women band and the first Mexican band to top the chart in its 45-year history. The band has announced its first headliner stadium concert at Estadio GNP Seguros, in Mexico City on February 5, 2027.

== Musical style and influences ==
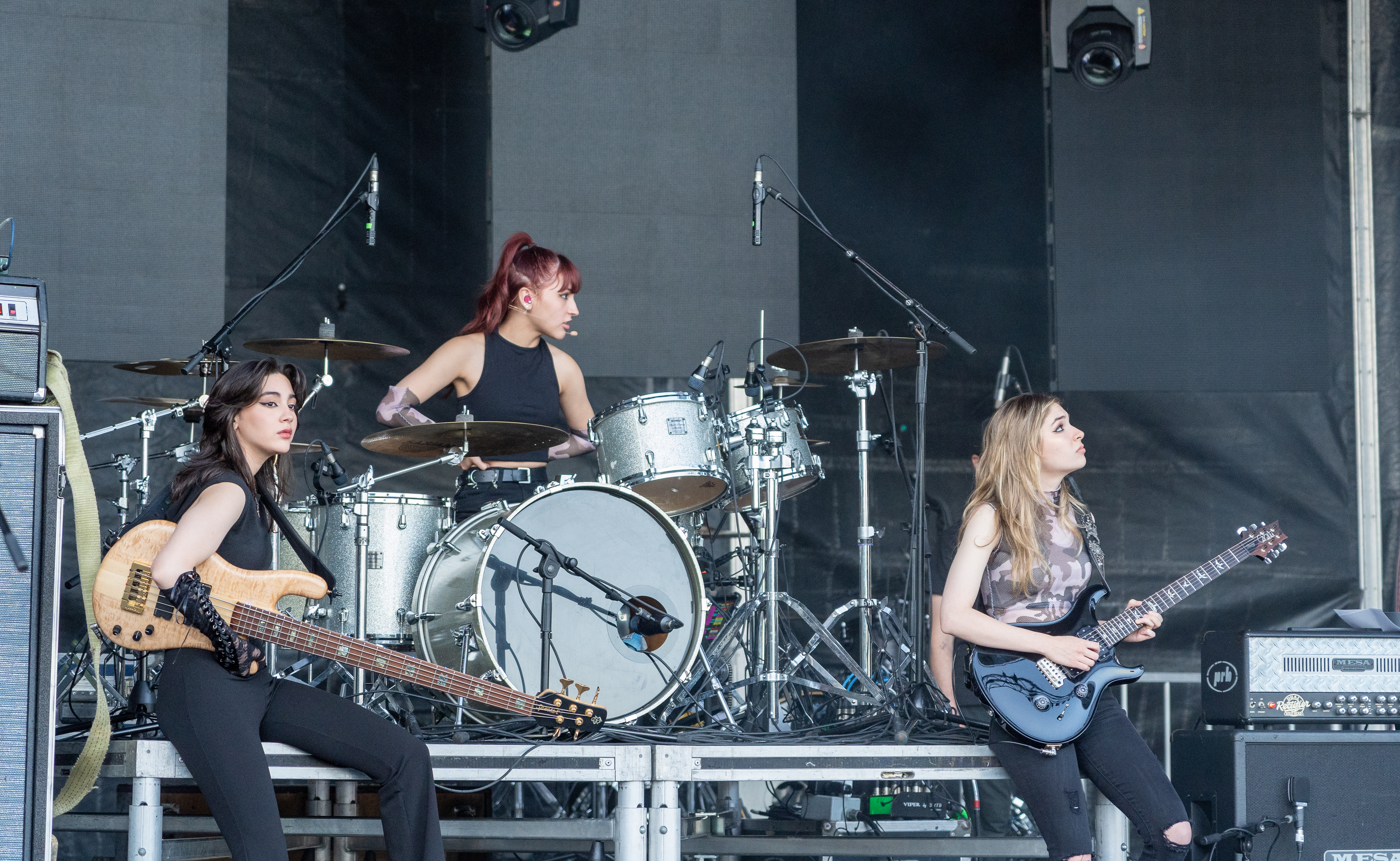
The Warning pre-show at the Sound of Music festival in Burlington, Ontario, 2022

The Warning have been described as a hard rock, heavy metal, alternative metal, post-grunge and alternative rock band.

The band said they listen to "every type of music there is, from classical music to pop". They named Metallica, Muse, My Chemical Romance, Pink Floyd, Queen, Paul McCartney, Neil Peart, David Gilmour, Placebo, Badflower, Paramore, K-pop and J-rock as musical influences. Their female artist inspirations include Hayley Williams, Esperanza Spalding, Sheila E., and Lzzy Hale.

Muse was particularly singled out by all three sisters as one of their heaviest influences. They mention having family night watch parties of videos of Muse concerts. Daniela (Dany) in particular was heavily inspired by Matt Bellamy, not only his guitar style but also his animated stage presence. In one YouTube video, she singles out the guitar riff in Muse's "Supermassive Black Hole" as a key influence and encourages aspiring guitarists to learn the riff.

== Band members ==
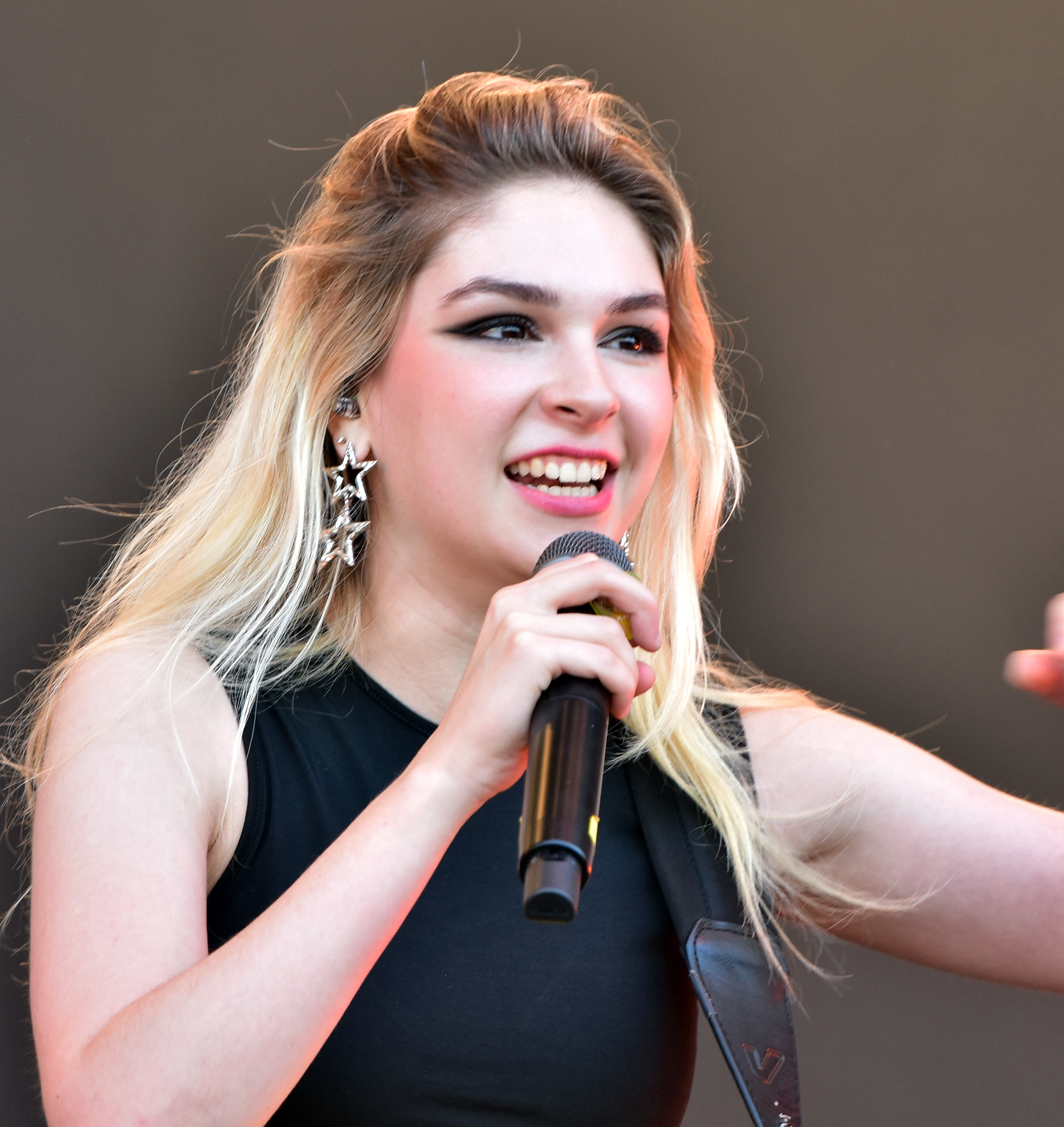
Daniela "Dany" Villarreal Vélez

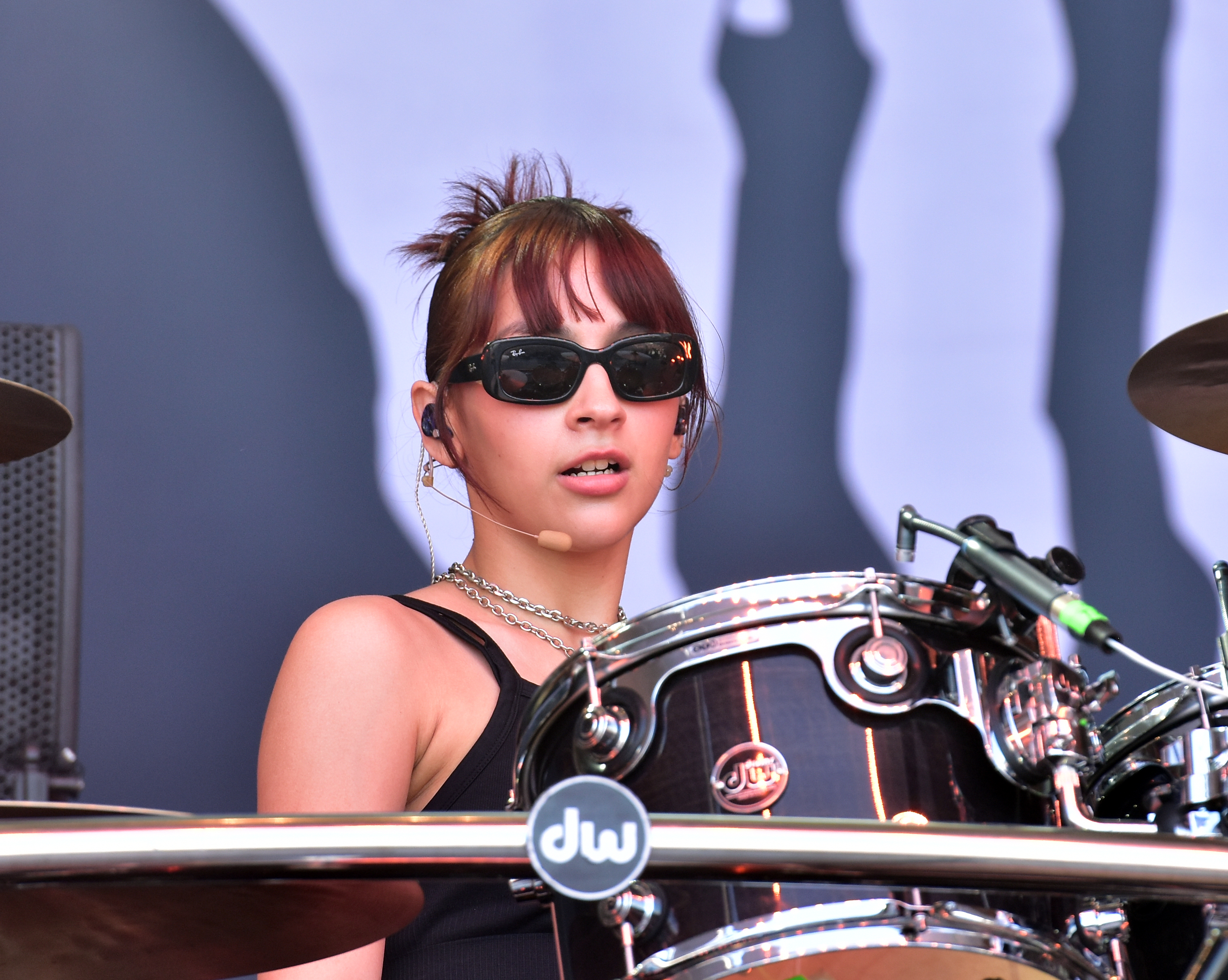
Paulina "Pau" Villarreal Vélez

Alejandra "Ale" Villarreal Vélez
- Daniela "Dany" Villarreal Vélez – guitars, lead and backing vocals, piano
- Paulina "Pau" Villarreal Vélez – drums, backing and lead vocals, piano
- Alejandra "Ale" Villarreal Vélez – bass, backing and occasional lead vocals, piano

== Discography ==
- XXI Century Blood (2017)
- Queen of the Murder Scene (2018)
- Error (2022)
- Keep Me Fed (2024)
- Everything's Falling (2026)

== Awards ==
Year	Award	Category	Nominee(s)	Result	Ref.
2019	Independent Music Awards	Rock / Hard Rock Album	Queen of the Murder Scene	Nominated	
2023	Modern Drummer's Readers Poll	"Up and Coming"	Paulina Villarreal	Won	
2023	Drumeo Awards	Rock Drummer of the Year	Paulina Villarreal	Won	
2024	MTV Video Music Awards	Best Push	The Warning	Nominated	
2024	MTV Europe Music Awards	MTV Push Performance of the Year	The Warning – "Automatic Sun"	Nominated	
2024	Latin Grammy Awards	Best Rock Song	"Qué Más Quieres"	Nominated	
2024	The Folk N Rock Awards	Best Rock Album of 2024	Keep Me Fed	Won	
2025	Tribeca Film Festival	Best Music Video	"Qué Más Quieres"	Nominated	
2025	Rock Sound Awards	Best International Artist	The Warning	Won	
2025	Glamour Women of the Year	Sisterhood Award	The Warning	Won	
2025	Modern Drummer's Readers Poll	"Rock"	Paulina Villarreal	Won	
2026	Latin Grammy Awards	Best Rock Song	"Ego"	Won	
