= Yu-Gi-Oh! Arc-V season 3 =

Yu-Gi-Oh! Arc-V
- Season 3
- Yuya Sakaki with Dark Requiem XYZ Dragon
- No. of episodes: 49

Release
- Original network: TV Tokyo
- Original release: April 3, 2016 – March 27, 2017

Season chronology
- ← Previous; Season 2 Next → Yu-Gi-Oh! VRAINS; Season 1

Yu-Gi-Oh! Arc-V is the fourth spin-off anime in the Yu-Gi-Oh! franchise and the eighth anime series overall. It is produced by Nihon Ad Systems and broadcast by TV Tokyo. It is directed by Katsumi Ono and produced by Studio Gallop. Its plot focuses on Yuya Sakaki. Yuya is a boy seeking to become the greatest entertainer in Action Duels who brings forth a new summoning method to Duel Monsters known as Pendulum Summoning. This season focuses on Yuya and his allies battling across the Xyz and Fusion Dimensions to end the Interdimensional War, as the truth behind the origins of the Four Dimensions is revealed.

Like the previous two seasons, there are four theme songs used for this season: two opening themes and two ending themes. From episodes 99-124, the fifth opening theme is "Kibō no Hikari" (キボウノヒカリ; lit. 'Light of Hope') by Unknown Number, while the fifth ending theme is "Vision" (ビジョン, Bijon) by Kusoiinkai. From episodes 125–147, the sixth opening theme is "Pendulum Beat" by SUPER★DRAGON, while the sixth ending theme is "Shussō Pendulum" (出走ペンデュラム, Shussō Pendyuramu; lit. 'Racing Pendulum') by M!LK. However, From Episodes 148–149, The seventh opening was "Gallop (Japanese Version)" (질주 (일본어판), jilju (ilbon-eopan)) by Park-eung sik, while the seventh ending was "Blue Flame Syndrome" (青い炎シンドローム, Aoi honō shindorōmu) by "Riho Lida". For the English dub version, the opening theme is "Can You Feel the Power".

The English dub premiered episodes in Canada and Australia on Teletoon and 9Go! respectively. In the United States, Nicktoons aired the season from January to December 2018.

== Episode list ==
No. overall	No. in season	English dub title / Japanese translated title	Directed by	Written by	Storyboarded by	Original release date	English air date (Note: Section reflects the first-time airing of the English dub in either Canada or Australia.)	American air date (Note: Section reflects the airing of the English dub in the United States.)
100	1	"A Warlike Welcome" / The Metropolis of Despair, Heartland; Transliteration: "Zetsubō no Miyako Hātorando" (Japanese: 絶望の都ハートランド)	Yasuyuki Fuse Animation director: Lee Sung-jin, Lee Seok-yoon	Ryo Tamura	Naoki Kotani	April 3, 2016 (Note: Episodes 99 and 100 aired together as a 1-hour television special.)	July 22, 2017 (Note: The English dub of Yu-Gi-Oh! Arc-V episodes 100–133 first premiered in Canada on Teletoon.)	January 13, 2018
While searching for Zuzu, Yuya, Gong, and Sylvio come across some refugees, who tell them that the Resistance has all but been wiped out. When some students from Duel Academy attack, Yuya and the others face against them. They recall everything they went through in the Synchro Dimension. After being defeated by the Lancers' Dueltainment, the Duel Academy students attempt to flee. They are defeated by a member of the Resistance: Kite Tenjo.
101	2	"Realm of The Cipher Dragon" / Galaxy Eyes; Transliteration: "Ginga no Manako" (Japanese: 銀河の眼)	Junichi Takahashi Animation director: Shinichi Shigematsu, Kazuyuki Ikai	Tsutomu Kamishiro	Tsukasa Sunaga	April 10, 2016	July 29, 2017	January 20, 2018
With Kite believing Yuya and the others to be members of Duel Academy, Sylvio rushes in to duel against him with Gong shortly joining him. As Gong and Sylvio clash with each other over how to go about the duel, Yuya recognizes Kite through his link with Yuto, who reveals that Kite's dueling has lost the kindness it once has and now replaces it with only anger. Despite Sylvio and Gong's attempts to stop him, Kite summons his ace monster, Galaxy-Eyes Cipher Dragon, and wins the duel. Afterwards, Yuya steps in to duel against him.
102	3	"Rush For Revenge" / The Merciless Hunter; Transliteration: "Hijō no Karyūdo" (Japanese: 非情の狩人)	Keiichirou Mochizuki Animation director: Toshi Shishikura	Tsutomu Kamishiro	Tsukasa Sunaga	April 24, 2016	August 5, 2017	January 27, 2018
Kite immediately brings out Galaxy-Eyes Cipher Dragon to deal a lot of damage to Yuya. Yuya brings out Odd-Eyes Rebellion Dragon, which Kite destroys by summoning another Galaxy-Eyes Cipher Dragon against it. However, Yuya makes use of his monster's pendulum ability and summons Dark Rebellion Xyz Dragon to remind Kite of Yuto. Shay arrives at this point to clear up the confusion. Despite Shay's assurance that Yuya and the others are allies, Kite remains defiant about returning to the Resistance and runs off.
103	4	"Rise of the Resistance" / The Brilliant Machine Angels; Transliteration: "Hanabanashiki Kikai Tenshi" (Japanese: 華々しき機械天使)	Kimiharu Muto, Ryūta Yamamoto Animation director: Yuya Kawamura	Tsutomu Kamishiro	Ryūta Yamamoto	May 1, 2016	August 12, 2017	February 3, 2018
Yuya and the others are brought to the Resistance's hideout. They are introduced to Shay's allies, Allen and Saya, who explain what happened to both the Resistance and Kite's family. Allen and Saya also reveal that Yusho had been their teacher. Yusho arrived in the Xyz Dimension at the time of his disappearance from the Standard Dimension, but they claim that he had abandoned them when they needed him most. Meanwhile, Zuzu finds herself in a town in the Fusion Dimension, where she is mistaken for a fleeing Duel Academy student and chased after. Just as Zuzu is cornered, she is aided by a girl named Alexis Rhodes, who uses her Cyber Girl monsters to defeat the pursuing officers. Afterwards, Alexis brings Zuzu to her hideout for those who fled from Duel Academy, where Zuzu is surprised to find Yusho is running his own duel school.
104	5	"Rumble in the Rubble" / The Hero Named "D"; Transliteration: ""Dī" no Na o Motsu Hīrō" (Japanese: 「D」の名を持つHERO)	Kang-Min Lee Animation director: Lee Sung-jin, Lee Seok-yoon	Tsutomu Kamishiro	Masahiro Takada	May 8, 2016	August 19, 2017	February 10, 2018
As Yusho explains what he has been through to Zuzu, Yuya comes across a duelist from Duel Academy with a strong grudge against his father. As the unknown duelist brings out Destiny Hero - Dystopia, Yuto believes that Yuya cannot reason with his opponent. Yuto forcefully takes control of him and summons Dark Rebellion Xyz Dragon. Yuto Ranks Up his monster into Dark Requiem Xyz Dragon. However, the match is brought to a draw by the opponent, who is revealed by Yusho to be one of Duel Academy's commanding officers, Aster Phoenix.
105	6	"Fighting For Friendship" / Bonds of the Resistance; Transliteration: "Rejisutansu no Kizuna" (Japanese: レジスタンスの絆)	Ippei Yokota Animation director: Tomoaki Kado, Eiichi Tokura	Ryo Tamura	Tsukasa Sunaga	May 15, 2016	August 26, 2017	February 17, 2018
With Kite remaining defiant about returning to the Resistance, Shay steps up to duel against him. Despite the power of Kite's Galaxy-Eyes Cipher Dragons, Shay remains determined to prove the worth of his allies and uses the power of Action Cards to bring out his Raidraptor - Ultimate Falcon. Just as Yuya reveals that Yuto is inside of him, Kite manages to turn things around and win the duel. Before Kite can turn Shay into a card, Saya reveals that she blames herself for not saving Lulu. This prompts Kite to leave.
106	7	"An Academic Test" / Arc Area Project; Transliteration: "Āku Eria Purojekuto" (Japanese: アークエリア･プロジェクト)	Yoshihide Yuuzumi Animation director: Teruhiko Yamazaki, Issei Hasegawa, Mizuki Satou	Tsutomu Kamishiro	Yukio Nishimoto	May 22, 2016	September 2, 2017	February 24, 2018
Yusho explains to Zuzu about what happened three years ago. After Declan stumbled across Duel Academy and learned of his father's ambitions, Yusho decided to aid him. Yusho set off to Duel Academy, but he ended up in the Xyz Dimension instead. Alexis explains how she came to learn the true nature of the Arc Project and chose to flee Duel Academy, which was when she came across Yusho. Just then, Yuri appears in town. He defeats one You Show student. This prompts the other five You Show students to take revenge, but Yuri also defeats them all at once. Before he can target Zuzu and Alexis, he disappears when Yugo suddenly arrives as Zuzu's bracelet teleports Yuri. Meanwhile, Leo prepares to send two of his emissaries after the Lancers.
107	8	"Belles and Whistles" / The Duel-Starved Amazoness; Transliteration: "Dyueru ni Ueta Amazonesu" (Japanese: 決闘に飢えたアマゾネス)	Naoki Kotani Animation director: Hidekazu Ebina	Tsutomu Kamishiro	Naoki Kotani	May 29, 2016	September 9, 2017	March 3, 2018
As Saya runs off in search of Kite, she and Allen find themselves in a tag duel against two of Duel Academy's top enforcers, Tag Duelists Gloria and Grace Tyler. During the duel, Saya makes a few mistakes due to her low self-esteem, but she is able to work together with Allen after receiving encouragement from him. However, their combined power is not enough to defeat the Tyler sisters' Amazoness Fusion monsters. Before the Tyler sisters can turn Saya and Allen into cards, Sylvio and Gong arrive on the scene.
108	9	"Twins with 'Tude" / Amazoness Trap; Transliteration: "Amazonesu Torappu" (Japanese: アマゾネス･トラップ)	Yoshitaka Koyama Animation director: Toshihiko Masuda	Tsutomu Kamishiro	Katsumi Ono	June 5, 2016	September 15, 2017	March 10, 2018
As both Sylvio and Gong are defeated, Yuya and Shay step in to face the Tyler sisters, who activate a trap allowing them to regain life points whenever they Special Summon monsters. Shay manages to bring out his Raidraptor - Rise Falcon, but he is unable to stop the sisters from gaining more life points. Managing to convince Yuto and Shay not to let their rage take over, Yuya follows his own duel style and uses the combination of Smile World, Dark Rebellion Xyz Dragon, and Raidraptor - Rise Falcon, to win the duel. With the Tyler sisters amazed by the duel they witnessed, the Obelisk Force takes over the mission to wipe out the Lancers under the Professor's orders.
109	10	"Surprise Showing" / The Falcon Perishes on the Battlefield; Transliteration: "Senjō ni Hateru Hayabusa" (Japanese: 戦場に果てる隼)	Yasuyuki Fuse Animation director: Lee Sung-jin, Lee Seok-yoon	Tsutomu Kamishiro	Tsukasa Sunaga	June 12, 2016	September 22, 2017	March 17, 2018
On their way returning to the hideout, Yuya and the others are halted by the Obelisk Force. As Yuya and Shay duel against them, Shay becomes severely injured when he protects Saya from some falling rubble after the Obelisk Force summon Chaos Ancient Gear Giant. Just as Yuya becomes cornered, Kite arrives and defeats the Obelisk Force. Kite decides not to turn them into cards. Afterwards, Aster arrives to settle his score with Yuya.
110	11	"Fenced In" / The Torn "Smile World"; Transliteration: "Yabukareta Sumairu Wārudo" (Japanese: 破かれたスマイル・ワールド)	Keiichirou Mochizuki Animation director: Toshi Shishikura	Atsushi Maekawa	Masahiro Takada	June 19, 2016	September 29, 2017	March 24, 2018
Aster forces Yuya into a duel against him, while Kite stands up against his army of Duel Academy students. Determined to duel Aster on his own terms, Yuya summons his new Fusion Monster Brave-Eyes Pendulum Dragon. Aster destroys it with Destiny Hero - Dystopia. After Yuya spots that Aster possesses a torn Smile World card, Aster explains how he fought against Yusho, who defeated him with his Dueltaining. Torn between Yusho's teachings and his allegiance to the Professor, Aster tore Yusho's Smile World card in half before accidentally sending Yusho to the Fusion Dimension. Aster is left with an obsession of once again finding Yusho and proving Leo's words to be right.
111	12	"Last Laugh" / Pendulum Heart; Transliteration: "Pendyuramu Hāto" (Japanese: ペンデュラムハート)	Ryūta Yamamoto Animation director: Noh Gil-bo	Ryo Tamura	Ryūta Yamamoto	June 26, 2016	October 6, 2017	March 31, 2018
Noticing Aster's wavering feelings, Yuya decides to show Aster how fun Dueltaining with joy and smiles can be. This reminds Aster of his duel with Yusho, who strived to make him enjoy dueling despite receiving an injury. Using his Dueltainment, Yuya manages to bring back Brave-Eyes Pendulum Dragon and defeat Aster, who finally smiles. Afterwards, an army of Duel Academy students surrounds the both of them.
112	13	"Hat Trick" / Leo's Security Army; Transliteration: "Reo no chian-gun" (Japanese: レオの治安軍)	Junichi Takahashi Animation director: Shinichi Shigematsu, Kazuyuki Ikai	Tsutomu Kamishiro	Yukio Nishimoto	July 3, 2016	October 13, 2017	April 7, 2018
Understanding Yusho's teachings to be correct, Aster and the Tyler sisters decide to join forces with Yuya and the Resistance. They encourage the other Duel Academy students to do the same. Back at the Duel Sanctuary, Aster explains that there is a way to restore those who have been turned into cards. Aster helps Yuya, Gong, Sylvio, and Kite travel to the Fusion Dimension to recover the cards Duel Academy has captured. Meanwhile, Dennis ambushes the You Show Duel School and challenges Yusho, his former teacher, to a duel. However, Yusho manages to use his Dueltaining tricks to distract Dennis, while everyone escapes. As Zuzu and Yugo make their escape, Yugo disappears when Yuya and the others arrive. Meanwhile, Dennis brings out a familiar face to go up against Yuya.
113	14	"Joy of Revenge" / The Thirst for Carnage; Transliteration: "Shura no Katsubō" (Japanese: 修羅の渇望)	Kimiharu Muto Animation director: Yuya Kawamura	Ryo Tamura	Masahiro Takada	July 10, 2016	October 20, 2017	April 14, 2018
Yuya is suddenly confronted by Iggy Arlo, who has sworn revenge on him following his defeat in the Junior Arc League Championship. While Kite pursues Dennis and Gong and Sylvio defend Zuzu, Yuya duels against Iggy, who utilizes a mysterious power to Fusion Summon the Level 12 Fusion Monster Shura the Combat Star. While Iggy continues to use his violent techniques to obtain Action Cards, Yuya manages to use the roller blades he received from Allen to dodge his attacks. Still holding onto his grudge, Iggy attempts to force the duel into a tie and go down with Yuya, but Yuya manages to save him and bring a Dueltastic finish to the duel. Iggy is left impressed by how fun the duel was. Iggy finally acknowledges Yuya's Dueltainment.
114	15	"All Duel Hands on Deck" / The Supergalaxy Shining in the Darkness; Transliteration: "Yami ni Kagayaku Chōginga" (Japanese: 闇に輝く超銀河)	Kang-Min Lee Animation director: Lee Sung-jin, Lee Seok-yoon	Tsutomu Kamishiro	Tsukasa Sunaga	July 17, 2016	October 27, 2017	April 21, 2018
Dennis catches up to Yusho and Alexis as they board a ship bound for Duel Academy, but Kite steps in to duel against him. As Kite is driven into a corner by Dennis' Performage monsters, he uses the Little Fairy card he received from Saya in order to obtain a Rank Up Magic card and summon Neo Galaxy-Eyes Cipher Dragon. Kite wins the duel. Believing he has nowhere left to return to, Dennis informs the others where Lulu and Rin are being held before turning himself into a card. As Yuya and the others search for a way to follow Yusho, they are once again reunited with Celina.
115	16	"Shiver Me Lancers" / Duel Pirate Captain Solo; Transliteration: "Dyueru Kaizoku Kyaputen Soro" (Japanese: 決闘海賊キャプテン・ソロ)	Yasumi Mikamoto Animation director: Teruhiko Yamazaki, Issei Hasegawa, Mizuki Satou	Atsushi Maekawa	Yoshihisa Matsumoto	July 24, 2016	November 3, 2017	April 28, 2018
Celina takes Yuya and the others to board a pirate ship owned by a pirate named Captain Cutter. This turns out to be a trap. As Celina captures Zuzu and leaves on a Duel Academy helicopter, Cutter challenges Yuya to a duel. With Cutter's monster preventing Yuya from summoning any of his own, Yuya is forced to rely on Action Cards. Yuya is either getting hindered by Cutter or stumbling upon self-damaging cards. Just as Yuya is knocked off the ship, he is saved by Crow, who arrives alongside Declan, Riley, Moon Shadow, and Sora. Joining the duel himself, Sora manages to overcome Cutter's restrictions and summons Frightfur Kraken to defeat Captain Cutter. Yuya, Sora, and the others do not believe Celina would capture Zuzu of her own free will. Yuya and the others continue onwards to Duel Academy.
116	17	"A Towering Achievement" / Guardians of the Sun and Moon; Transliteration: "Taiyō to Tsuki no Shugosha" (Japanese: 太陽と月の守護者)	Naoki Kotani Animation director: Hidekazu Ebina	Atsushi Maekawa	Naoki Kotani	July 31, 2016	November 10, 2017	May 5, 2018
Following his teleportation, Yugo finds himself in the middle of Duel Academy. He eventually comes across Kite, Yusho, and Alexis upon their arrival. While Yusho and Alexis look for Leo, Yugo and Kite both head to the towers where Rin and Lulu are being held. They encounter the guardians, Apollo and Diana, respectively. Apollo and Diana use similar tactics. They use their monsters' special abilities to weaken their opponents' monsters and put Yugo and Kite at a disadvantage. However, Yugo and Kite manage to summon Crystal Wing Synchro Dragon and Neo Galaxy-Eyes Cipher Dragon to win their respective duels before heading inside the tower to rescue Rin and Lulu. Yugo and Kite are unaware that Rin and Lulu are under mind control.
117	18	"Grip of the Parasite" / The Sinister Bell's Chime; Transliteration: "Kiba o Muku Suzu no Ne" (Japanese: 牙をむく鈴の音)	Yoshitaka Koyama Animation director: Toshihiko Masuda	Tsutomu Kamishiro	Masahiro Takada	August 7, 2016	November 17, 2017	May 12, 2018
As Rin and Lulu suddenly turn against Yugo and Kite, Aster arrives with Shay, who reveals that the girls are being controlled by parasitic monsters created by one of the duelists within Leo's inner circle known as the Doctor. Meanwhile, Declan explains to Yuya and the others about Leo's project, Revival Zero, which seems to involve Celina and Yuri. He suspects that Yuya, Zuzu, and their lookalikes are also a part of Leo's plan. As Rin duels against Yugo, she uses a Fusion Parasite to Fusion summon Windwitch Crystal Bell. Rin destroys Yugo's Duel Runner. Yugo tries to beat her using Crystal Wing Synchro Dragon, but this is not enough to free Rin from her mind control and results in his defeat.
118	19	"Survival of the Fittest" / Survival Duel; Transliteration: "Sabaibaru Dyueru" (Japanese: サバイバル・デュエル)	Yasuyuki Fuse Animation director: Lee Sung-jin, Lee Seok-yoon	Tsutomu Kamishiro	Yukio Nishimoto	August 14, 2016	November 24, 2017	May 19, 2018
As Yuya's group arrives at Duel Academy, Yuya, Gong, Sylvio, Crow, and Moon Shadow are captured and forced into a Survival Duel Battle Royal against Obelisk Blue students. As Moon Shadow heads off on his own, he comes up against a mysterious opponent who turns both him and several Duel Academy students into cards. While Yuya and Gong learn from Moon Shadow's last message that there is another duelist besides the Duel Academy students, Sylvio is attacked as well. Meanwhile, Aster catches up to Yugo and theorizes who might be behind Rin's strange behavior.
119	20	"Family Face Off" / The Little Bird Trapped in Darkness; Transliteration: "Yami ni Ochita Kotori" (Japanese: 闇に落ちた小鳥)	Keiichirou Mochizuki Animation director: Toshi Shishikura	Atsushi Maekawa	Tsukasa Sunaga	August 21, 2016	December 1, 2017	June 2, 2018
Shay confronts the controlled Lulu, while Kite goes off in search of the one controlling her. As Lulu deals damage to Shay, the true Lulu inside her senses the pain her brother is going through. After Lulu uses the Fusion Parasite to bring out Lyrilusc - Independent Nightingale, Shay uses Saya's Little Fairy, which was given to him by Kite. He Cross-Xyz summons Raidraptor - Stranger Falcon, while Lulu's inner self stops her dark self from stopping Shay's attack. This allows Shay to defeat her. Back at the jungle, as Crow and Sylvio come up against two Duel Academy students, they are all targeted by the mysterious duelist.
120	21	"The Battle Beast"; Transliteration: "Batoru Bīsuto" (Japanese: バトル・ビースト)	Ryūta Yamamoto Animation director: Noh Gil-bo	Atsushi Maekawa	Ryūta Yamamoto	August 28, 2016	December 8, 2017	June 2, 2018
Defeating the Duel Academy students in an instant by the wild duelist known only as the "Battle Beast", Crow breaks Sylvio's duel disk before sacrificing himself to bring the Battle Beast into the open. Determined to avenge Crow, Yuya and Gong battle against Battle Beast in a duel. As Battle Beast pressures the two duelists with his Gladiator Beasts, Gong goes against his own Heavystrong Style to protect Yuya with an Action Card. Before Battle Beast can turn Gong into a card, the Master of Faster, Jack Atlas, arrives on the scene.
121	22	"Taming of the BB" / The Wicked Brand; Transliteration: "Saikyō no Rakuin" (Japanese: 最凶の烙印)	Junichi Takahashi Animation director: Kazuyuki Ikai, Toshie Fujiwara	Tsutomu Kamishiro	Masahiro Takada	September 4, 2016	December 15, 2017	June 9, 2018
Jack joins Yuya's duel and manages to use Scarlight Red Dragon Archfiend's ability to damage Battle Beast. As Battle Beast feels relief from being able to survive his turn, Sanders who is the instructor that trained him, rejects such behavior and joins the duel himself. Learning that Leo is targeting him, Yuya and Yuto suspects that Leo knows behind the strange phenomenon that he and his lookalikes have experienced. Under pressure from Sanders' demands, Battle Beast suddenly directs his attack towards him.
122	23	"Show of Nature" / Glory on the Academia! Transliteration: "Gurōrī on ji Akademia!" (Japanese: グローリー・オン・ジ・アカデミア！)	Kimiharu Muto Animation director: Yuya Kawamura	Tsutomu Kamishiro	Katsumi Ono	September 11, 2016	December 22, 2017	June 16, 2018
Before Battle Beast can turn Sanders into a card, Yuya suspects that Battle Beast does not really want to fight. The isolation and harsh training that Sanders pushed on BB caused the Battle Beast to think that the only way to protect himself is by defeating and turning his opponent into cards. As Battle Beast decides to try and defeat Yuya first, Jack brings out Tyrant Red Dragon Archfiend. Battle Beast responds by bringing out the Gladiator Beast - Great Fortress to protect himself. Wanting to show Battle Beast the joy of dueling without hurting anyone, Yuya brings out his Dueltainment spirit and low level Pendulum Monsters to win the duel. His Dueltaining art work successfully convinces BB and the Duel Academy students who were watching to join forces with them. Meanwhile, as Declan, Sora, and Riley meet up with Yusho and Alexis, they are confronted by Yuri.
123	24	"Fusion Destruction" / The Glorious Mechanical Dragon; Transliteration: "Eikō no Kikairyū" (Japanese: 栄光の機械龍)	Kang-Min Lee Animation director: Lee Sung-jin, Lee Seok-yoon	Ryo Tamura	Masahiro Takada	September 18, 2016	December 30, 2017	June 23, 2018
Alexis stays behind to face Yuri, while Sora sets off a cage so that Yusho, Declan, and Riley can move on ahead. Using an Ancient Gear deck awarded to honorable students for the first time, Yuri brings out Ancient Gear Reactor Dragon. Alexis manages to take control of it and destroy Yuri's Polymerization cards. Alexis corners Yuri and offers her friendship to him. Yuri reveals that he initially duels not only for himself, but he also duels to please Leo. However, Yuri no longer cares for Leo's goal and decides to card every person in all the dimensions for his own entertainment. Yuri admits that he lied about not knowing the deck and has added his own card into the deck as he uses Super Polymerization to summon Ultimate Ancient Gear Golem to defeat Alexis and turns her into a card. Yuri prepares to duel Sora.
124	25	"Paraside Seeing" / The Revived Phantom Knights; Transliteration: "Yomigaeru Fantomu Naitsu" (Japanese: 蘇る幻影騎士団)	Yasumi Mikamoto Animation director: Mizuki Satou, Issei Hasegawa, Teruhiko Yamazaki	Atsushi Maekawa	Yoshihisa Matsumoto	September 25, 2016	January 5, 2018	June 30, 2018
While searching for Zuzu, Yuya comes across Lulu, who once again becomes possessed by the Doctor's Parasitic Monster and challenges Yuya to a duel. As Yuto has Yuya use his deck to duel, Lulu immediately brings out Independent Nightingale. Yuya brings out Yuto's Phantom Knight monsters. Shay attempts to go to the Doctor to stop his mind control, but he is knocked out by Celina. Celina joins the duel and summons the ultimate parasitic monster, Parasite Queen. Celina reveals that Lulu, Rin, Zuzu, and herself have parasites implanted into their brains, which completely shocks Yuya knowing Zuzu is being mind controlled. Yuto switches his body with Yuya and brings out Dark Rebellion Xyz Dragon.
125	26	"Rise of the Parasites" / The Blazing Dragon; Transliteration: "Rekka no Ryū" (Japanese: 烈火の竜)	Naoki Kotani Animation director: Hidekazu Ebina	Atsushi Maekawa	Naoki Kotani	October 2, 2016	January 12, 2018	July 7, 2018
Celina and Lulu continue to attack with Parasite Queen, which causes Yuto to pass out and switches back with Yuya. The Doctor's parasite crawls into Yuya's ear and tries to take control of him, but it is destroyed by the darkness residing within him. Meanwhile, just as Yuri defeats Sora and prepares to turn him into a card, he is interrupted by the arrival of Yugo and Aster. Angered by the doctor's treatment of Zuzu, Yuya and Yuto go berserk and summon Odd-Eyes Raging Dragon. Yuya uses its destructive power to defeat Celina and Lulu in one attack. As Yuya chases after them, he ends up being captured by the Doctor. Meanwhile, Yusho, Declan, and Riley finally confront Leo.
126	27	"An Evil Ascends" / The Day the Devil was Born; Transliteration: "Akuma ga Umareta Hi" (Japanese: 悪魔が生まれた日)	Yoshitaka Koyama Animation director: Toshihiko Masuda	Tsutomu Kamishiro	Katsumi Ono	October 9, 2016	January 19, 2018	July 14, 2018
Yugo confronts Yuri, while Aster moves on ahead to look for the Doctor. Leo reveals that the ARC system he was credited with creating actually originated from the United World, which is a realm possessing all four summoning methods. As Leo used this technology to enhance the game of Duel Monsters and bring life to the monsters, a duelist named Zarc began to use the solid mass of the monsters to duel violently against his opponents. As Leo tells the story, Yugo and Yuri's dragons start to once again cause an occurrence within Yuya and Yuto. It also affects Stargazer and Timegazer Magicians, which Riley is able to sense due to his experience as a war victim. After rising to the top of the duel world, Zarc suddenly used his dragons to wreak havoc across the world before combining with them to become the ultimate monster known as the Supreme King ZARC.
127	28	"Revival Zero"; Transliteration: "Ribaiburu Zero" (Japanese: リバイブル・ゼロ)	Yasuyuki Fuse Animation director: Lee Sung-jin, Kim Hye-jeong	Tsutomu Kamishiro	Yasuyuki Fuse	October 16, 2016	January 26, 2018	July 21, 2018
As Yuya breaks out of his imprisonment and rejoins Yusho, Leo claims that Yuya is Yusho's son but at the same time he is also not his son. Leo brings out Zuzu, Celina, Lulu, and Rin and turns the Doctor into a card for his dangerous thinking. Leo continues his story in which he created four cards that could potentially stop Zarc. Before he could use them himself, Leo's daughter, Ray, took the cards herself and used them against Zarc, which split the both of them and the world into the current four dimensions. After Leo recovered his memories that were lost upon ending up in the Standard Dimension, he traveled to the Fusion Dimension in order to find traces of Ray. Leo discovered Ray has been split into Zuzu, Celina, Lulu, and Rin. Leo reveals that the Arc Project's true purpose is to use the energy from people who have been turned into cards in order to rejoin the four dimensions into one united dimension named Arc-V and to reunite the four girls into Ray once more. After Leo reveals that Zarc had also split into Yuya, Yuto, Yugo, and Yuri, he orders Declan to duel with him against Yuya. Declan instead sides with Yuya and duels against his father.
128	29	"What Lurks Beneath" / Decisive Battle! Spirit Tech Force; Transliteration: "Kessen! Supiritto Tekku Fōsu" (Japanese: 決戦！精霊機巧軍)	Keiichirou Mochizuki Animation director: Toshi Shishikura	Tsutomu Kamishiro	Shōji Nishida	October 23, 2016	February 2, 2018	July 28, 2018
Leo begins the process to combine the four dimensions and fuse the four girls into Ray. This prompts Yuya to aim to finish their duel quickly without letting Zarc inside of him take control. As both Yuya and Declan bring out their monsters, Yusho recalls that he seemingly has no memories of Yuya's birth and realizes those memories never existed to begin with. Despite Declan blocking off his ability to Fusion, Synchro, or Xyz summon, Leo shows he is able to Pendulum Summon and summons his ace monster, Spirit Tech Force: Pendulum Governor. Despite his attempts to hold in his anger, Yuya and Yuto become possessed by Zarc and Fusion summons Performapal Gatlinghoul to deal 2400 points of damage to Leo. Meanwhile, Yusho thinks that he was chosen by Zarc to raise his reincarnation, Yuya, as a duelist so that he can be revived.
129	30	"A Duel Within" / Glimpse of the Supreme King; Transliteration: "Haō no Henrin" (Japanese: 覇王の片鱗)	Ryūta Yamamoto Animation director: Noh Gil-bo	Tsutomu Kamishiro	Ryūta Yamamoto	October 30, 2016	February 9, 2018	August 4, 2018
Accumulating more energies from the cards he had gathered, Leo begins the process to fuse Zuzu, Celina, Rin, and Lulu together into Ray. Angered by Leo's actions, Yuya starts to become more like Zarc and brings out Odd-Eyes Raging Dragon. Before Yuya can defeat Leo, Yusho steps in and uses a bugged trap card to restrain Yuya and terminate the duel. Yusho sets off to stop Yugo and Yuri from further advancing Zarc's revival.
130	31	"Duel Interrupted" / The Greedy Venomous Dragon; Transliteration: "Yokubukaki Mōdokuryū" (Japanese: 欲深き猛毒龍)	Junichi Takahashi Animation director: Toshie Fujiwara, Kazuyuki Ikai	Atsushi Maekawa	Tsukasa Sunaga	November 6, 2016	February 16, 2018	August 11, 2018
Kite and Aster come across Yusho and learn what is happening to Yuya and Yuto. They step in to stop Yugo and Yuri, who are in the middle of their duel. As Yugo brings out Crystal Wing Synchro Dragon, Aster summons out Destiny Hero - Dusktopia to remind Yugo that he should be fighting to save Rin. While Yugo comes back to his senses, Yuri summons out Greedy Venom Fusion Dragon, whose abilities knock Aster and Kite out of the duel. Aster uses Dusktopia's special ability to save Yugo from defeat, which leaves Yugo to duel Yuri alone.
131	32	"Sibling Standoff" / The Light Shining in Eternal Darkness; Transliteration: "Tokoyami ni Sasu Hikari" (Japanese: 常闇に射す光)	Kimiharu Muto Animation director: Yuya Kawamura	Atsushi Maekawa	Masahiro Takada	November 13, 2016	February 23, 2018	August 18, 2018
Seeing a vision of Ray urging him to revive her so she can stop Zarc, Riley stands against Declan to prevent him from stopping Ray's revival. Declan quickly summons his Triple D monsters and uses a trap card to seal off Riley's tactics. However, Riley manages to overcome Declan's trap and summons Triple C Sonic Halberd of Battle to turn the tide in his favor. Despite Yugo's best efforts, Yuri manages to defeat him using the combination of Starving Venom Fusion Dragon and his Predaplants' special abilities.
132	33	"Sleight of Hands" / The Peerless Entertainer; Transliteration: "Kidai no Entāteinā" (Japanese: 稀代のエンターテイナー)	Kang-Min Lee Animation director: Lee Sung-jin, Kim Hye-jeong	Tsutomu Kamishiro	Noche Yagi	November 20, 2016	March 2, 2018	August 25, 2018
Declan manages to withstand Riley's attack and summons Triple D Knowledge King Tomb Conquistador to win the duel. Meanwhile, Yuri manages to absorb Yugo into himself and sets his sights on absorbing Yuya as well after learning of their connection. Determined to stop Yuri from reviving Zarc, Yusho confronts Yuri in a duel and brings out his ace monster, Performapal Sky Magician. Using his Dueltaining style, Yusho manages to send Yuri's Super Polymerization card he had set back to his deck.
133	34	"A Father's Finale" / A Dazzling Entertainment Show; Transliteration: "Kagayakashiki Entame Shō" (Japanese: 輝かしきエンタメショー)	Yasumi Mikamoto Animation director: Mizuki Satou, Issei Hasegawa, Sayuri Ehara	Tsutomu Kamishiro	Shōji Nishida	November 27, 2016	March 9, 2018	September 1, 2018
As Yusho pushes Yuri into a corner, Yuya regain his senses thanks to Yusho's Dueltainment Spectacular. Just when it seems it will be Yusho's victory, Yuri turns the table in his favor by revealing that his trump card is not Super Polymerization that Yusho had thought. Yuri's true trump card is Ultra Polymerization that allows him to summon Starving Venom Fusion Dragon and Yugo's Clear Wing Synchro Dragon. The summoning of the two dragons caused Zarc inside Yuya and Yuto to react again. Using the dragons' special abilities in conjunction with a vicious double spell card combo, Yuri reduces Yusho's life points to zero and seals Yusho in a card. Completely shocked at his father's defeat, Yuya gives in to his anger and confronts Yuri.
134	35	"Relentless" / Allure of Darkness; Transliteration: "Yami no Yūwaku" (Japanese: 闇の誘惑)	Yoshitaka Koyama Animation director: Toshihiko Masuda	Ryo Tamura	Masahiro Takada	December 11, 2016	March 11, 2018 (Note: The English dub of Yu-Gi-Oh! Arc-V episodes 134–148 first premiered in Australia on 9Go!.)	September 8, 2018
To take back his father who is sealed inside a card, Yuya accepts Yuri's challenge to a duel. Both Yuya and Yuto have difficulty in the duel as not only do they have to face Yuri's onslaught, they also must hold off against Zarc whose influence becomes harder to resist once Yuri summons Starving Venom Fusion Dragon and Clear Wing Synchro Dragon, while Yuya summons Odd-Eyes Pendulum Dragon. Deciding to take a risk to defeat Yuri, Yuto convinces Yuya to summon Dark Rebellion Xyz Dragon, which consequently causes Yuto to finally succumb to Zarc's control and leaves Yuya to fight Yuri alone. Unfortunately, Yuri reveals his trap card that allows him to take control of Yuto's dragon and corners Yuya further. Meanwhile, Leo has successfully activated Arc-V and starts the union of the four dimensions.
135	36	"Time to Reunite!" / The Trembling Dimensions; Transliteration: "Yureugoku Jigen" (Japanese: 揺れ動く次元)	Naoki Kotani Animation director: Hidekazu Ebina, Yûko Ebara	Tsutomu Kamishiro	Naoki Kotani	December 18, 2016	March 17, 2018	September 15, 2018
As the union of the four dimensions begin, Yuya continues to struggle against Yuri who continuously gains an advantage in Action Cards. The continuous interference forces Yuya to send Smile World into the graveyard to avoid the finishing blow, which greatly horrifies him since the card symbolizes his bond with his father. It was not until Declan, Riley, Sora, and Aster expresses their faith in him that Yuya regains his determination. Focusing only to win the duel, Yuya was able to take back Yuto's Dark Rebellion Xyz Dragon and take control of Yugo's Clear Wing Synchro Dragon. Yuya defeats Yuri's Starving Venom Fusion Dragon with Odd-Eyes Pendulum Dragon. After the duel, Zarc reveals that he has fully taken control of Yuya's body and soul. Zarc summons Astrograph Sorcerer and fuses with his reincarnations, which revives himself as the Supreme King Z-ARC.
136	37	"A Most Brutal Duel" / Reign of the Supreme Dragon King; Transliteration: "Haōryū Kunrin" (Japanese: 覇王龍君臨)	Yasuyuki Fuse Animation director: Lee Sung-jin, Kim Hye-jeong	Atsushi Maekawa	Yasuyuki Fuse	December 25, 2016	March 18, 2018	September 22, 2018
The revived Z-ARC begins his attack on the Fusion Dimension. While Declan and Riley go to confront Leo after Riley heard Ray's plea to be revived, Aster and Sora challenge Zarc to a duel. Believing that Yuya still exists despite Zarc saying otherwise, Aster and Sora unleash their attacks while calling out for Yuya to return. Despite their best efforts, their words do not reach Yuya nor can they land a scratch on Zarc who quickly overwhelms them by performing an Integration Summon. Zarc fuses himself with the Four Heavenly Dragons to summon Supreme King Z-ARC and easily defeats Aster and Sora. Afterwards, Shay and Kite take over the duel, who are determined to carry out Aster and Sora's feelings to save Yuya.
137	38	"A Dark Summoning" / The Rebellious Supreme King's Dragon Servant; Transliteration: "Hangyaku no Haōkenryū" (Japanese: 反逆の覇王眷龍)	Keiichirou Mochizuki Animation director: Toshi Shishikura	Atsushi Maekawa	Shōji Nishida	January 8, 2017	March 24, 2018	September 29, 2018
Shay and Kite begin their duel against Zarc to bring back Yuya and Yuto. Zarc is able to perform an Xyz Summon during Shay's turn and summons Supreme King Dragon Dark Rebellion. Furthermore, his power ensures his monster will not be affected by any Fusion, Synchro, and Xyz effects. While looking for Leo, Declan and Riley see the souls of the people from New Domino City and Heartland City due to the dimensional integration. In Heartland City, Allen and Saya got absorbed into a wormhole that sent them to Shay and Kite's location. Shay and Kite are able to power up their monsters' attacks higher than Dark Rebellion just as it used up its Overlay Units. However, Zarc sent Dark Rebellion back to his Extra Deck to bring back the monsters he used to summon it and reduces Shay and Kite's monsters' attack points to zero. When they attempted to use the Action Cards, Z-ARC's power destroyed the Action Cards they got as any card they add to their hands outside Draw Phase will be destroyed. As Gong and Jack join the duel, Zarc defeats Shay and Kite, who passed the task to save Yuya to Gong and Jack.
138	39	"Master of Disaster" / The Shadow-Winged Dragon; Transliteration: "Anyoku no Ryū" (Japanese: 暗翼の龍)	Ryūta Yamamoto Animation director: Noh Gil-bo	Tsutomu Kamishiro	Ryūta Yamamoto	January 15, 2017	March 31, 2018	October 6, 2018
Gong decides to focus on protecting Jack's Scarlight Red Dragon Archfiend to open a path for Jack to attack. Zarc summons Supreme King Dragon Clear Wing and activates an equip spell card that allows it to attack and inflict damage on all of Jack and Gong's monsters. Due to Gong's monsters' abilities, Jack survived the attacks, while Gong received all the damage that eventually defeated him. Due to dimensional integration, New Domino City got transported into the Fusion Dimension. Crow is revived and joins the duel with Sylvio. Despite able to finally destroy Supreme King Dragon Clear Wing, Zarc remains unscathed due to his Supreme Gates' Pendulum abilities and defeats Jack. Gong tells Sylvio that Zarc flinched when he called him a Dueltainer, which he believes to be the proof that Yuya still exists. Meanwhile, Ray warns Riley that Leo plans to split the dimensions once more using the four Natural Energy cards that she used before to defeat Zarc.
139	40	"Clash Talk" / The Eyes Tainted by Darkness; Transliteration: "Yami ni Somaru Manako" (Japanese: 闇に染まる眼)	Kang-Min Lee Animation director: Lee Sung-jin, Kim Hye-jeong, Lee Seok-yoon	Tsutomu Kamishiro	Tsukasa Sunaga	January 22, 2017	April 1, 2018	October 13, 2018
Riley convinces Declan to stop Leo from sacrificing himself and instead go to stop Zarc. While he attacks, Crow notices how much Zarc does not want to lose and points this fact to Z-ARC, who starts to lose his composure as Crow is finally able to inflict some damage onto Zarc. When Sylvio performs a Pendulum Summon, Zarc summons Supreme King Dragon Odd-Eyes. Sylvio manages to force Zarc into a defensive position, but he fails to destroy the Supreme King Dragon Odd-Eyes because Zarc is using the monsters he has destroyed to protect it. With the combination of his trap card and Odd-Eyes' effect, Zarc defeats Crow and Sylvio. As the dimensional integration nears its completion, Leo intrudes in the duel, which is followed by Declan. Unfortunately, before Leo can use the four Natural Energy cards necessary to defeat Zarc, Zarc uses a trap card to destroy it together with Leo. In the main core of Arc-V, Riley finally meets Ray face-to-face.
140	41	"A Ray of Hope" / Pendulum of the Soul; Transliteration: "Tamashii no Pendyuramu" (Japanese: 魂のペンデュラム)	Kimiharu Muto Animation director: Yuya Kawamura	Tsutomu Kamishiro	Katsumi Ono	January 29, 2017	April 7, 2018	October 20, 2018
Riley allows Ray to borrow his body as a vessel so she can fight Zarc as Declan manages to deal considerable damage in his duel against Zarc. Though Declan insists that Yuya still exists because Zarc can use Pendulum Summoning, Zarc reveals himself to be its true creator the moment he was splintered by Ray. Zarc summons all of his Supreme King Dragons and swiftly defeats Declan as Ray joins the duel through Riley's body. Ray proceeds to retrieve the four Natural Energy cards from Leo's graveyard to negate Z-ARC's Fusion, Sychro, and Xyz attributes to significantly weaken him and destroy his Supreme Dragon form. Despite Z-ARC's insistence that Yuya is no more, Ray reveals that Pendulum Summon was created from both Zarc's vengeful desires and the power of the four Natural Energy cards themselves. Zuzu briefly manifests separately to reach Yuya within his mind and remind him of his desire and promise to her. With Yuya's counterparts supporting him, Yuya musters the strength to regain control over himself to place Zarc at a greater disadvantage for Ray to finish the duel. As Arc-V begins to splinter once more, Riley uses this moment to regain control of his body so he can use the four Natural Energy cards' power to extract Zarc from Yuya and seal Zarc's spirit into himself.
141	42	"Swinging Back Into Action" / Junior Youth Championship; Transliteration: "Juniayūsu Senshuken" (Japanese: ジュニアユース選手権)	Yasumi Mikamoto Animation director: Mizuki Satou, Issei Hasegawa, Sayuri Ehara	Atsushi Maekawa	Masahiro Takada	February 5, 2017	April 8, 2018	October 27, 2018
The world is once more split into four dimensions. The Standard Dimension reboots into the Pendulum Dimension, where everyone can now use Pendulum Summoning. Having the vague feeling that something is missing, Yuya enjoys a peaceful day until he is invited by Declan alongside Gong and Sylvio to duel Moon Shadow in the Junior Arc League Championship. During the Battle Royal, Moon Shadow reminded everyone about the Arc League Championship and Lancers selection, which turns out to be Declan's plan to restore everyone's memories of their adventures across the universe for the sake of the infant that Riley had become.
142	43	"Deja Duel" / Overflowing Memories; Transliteration: "Afureru Kioku" (Japanese: あふれる記憶)	Yoshitaka Koyama Animation director: Wakana Yamashina, Maiko Abe	Atsushi Maekawa	Noche Yagi	February 12, 2017	April 14, 2018	November 3, 2018
The battle royal turns into a tag duel between Yuya and Gong against Sylvio and Moon Shadow. During the duel, Yuya continuously lost in thought as he regains his memories of his interdimensional adventures. Skip regains his memories of Zuzu after entering her room. He announces her absence to everyone, which results in everyone to remember everything about Zuzu and the other dimensions. As Gong defeats Sylvio and Moon Shadow single-handed, a shocked Yuya regains his memories of the dimensions up to being subverted by Zarc.
143	44	"Amateur Hour" / Soul of the Supreme King; Transliteration: "Haō no Tamashii" (Japanese: 覇王の魂)	Yasuyuki Fuse Animation director: Lee Sung-jin, Kim Hye-jeong	Tsutomu Kamishiro	Yasuyuki Fuse	February 19, 2017	April 15, 2018	November 10, 2018
Declan reveals to Yuya that Riley became an infant due to the power of the four Natural Energy cards and absorbing Zarc's evil essence to keep him from splintering into the four dimensions again. Declan adds that Zarc is gradually taking over Riley's body, and it would only be a matter of time before he resumes his attack on the world. He explains that Yuya's skills as a Dueltainer might enable Riley to smile to stop Zarc for good. Yuya is perturbed by how he is supposed to carry out Declan's plan along with his impression that Ray and her incarnations may still be within Arc-V. Gong encourages Yuya by casting aside his Heavy Strong Style to attack Yuya with Action Cards. The duel turns into a race for Action Cards and repeated counterattacks, Yuya deals piercing damage, while Gong destroys Yuya's Odd-Eyes Pendulum Dragon. When both of their life points are low, Yuya manages to get an Action Card and defeats Gong. Declan takes Yuya to a functioning fragment of Arc-V and tells him that he must travel to the other dimensions and defeat the remaining Lancers to be approved for Senior class before saving Riley. Yuya travels to the Xyz Dimension, where he finds Dennis instead of Shay as his next opponent.
144	45	"Showtime Showdown" / The Cursed Gear Mask; Transliteration: "Norowareshi Gia Masuku" (Japanese: 呪われし機械仮面)	Masahiro Takada Animation director: Yûko Ebara, Akemi Yokota	Ryo Tamura	Masahiro Takada	February 26, 2017	April 21, 2018	November 17, 2018
Allen and Saya reveal to Yuya that Shay went to the Fusion Dimension to search for Lulu. Dennis refuses to allow Yuya to leave until he defeats him in a duel. As the duel commences, Dennis summons his Fusion monsters while threatening the Heartland citizens that he will turn them into cards again if they leave. Aster explains that the citizens of Heartland are severely traumatized by Duel Academy's invasion to the point that they rejected dueling itself. Dennis presents himself as a villain as he and Aster hope Yuya might help restore the peoples' love for dueling. Realizing Dennis' goal, the two start their Dueltainment as Dennis disposes his bad guy act. Using the combination of his permanent spell cards and Odd-Eyes Pendulum Dragon, Yuya defeats Dennis and successfully restores the citizens' love for dueling. Entrusting Dennis to teach the children of Heartland City Dueltaining, Yuya leaves for the Fusion Dimension to duel Shay.
145	46	"Closure By Cards" / Endless Rebellion; Transliteration: "Owarinaki Hangyaku" (Japanese: 終わりなき反逆)	Ryūta Yamamoto Animation director: Noh Gil-bo	Atsushi Maekawa	Noche Yagi	March 5, 2017	April 22, 2018	December 1, 2018
Arriving in the Fusion Dimension, Yuya finds Alexis trying to calm down Shay while keeping him away from Leo who is studying Ray's condition. When Shay refuses to accept Yuya telling him that Lulu is Ray's incarnation, Alexis and Sora decide to let Shay confront a remorseful Leo, who reveals that Lulu and her counterparts are no more as they have been merged back into their original form. He mentions the same thing occurred with Yuto, Yugo, and Yuri following Zarc's reconstitution, whose original body is now Yuya's. Distraught over losing his sister and his best friend, Shay partially blames Yuya for their apparent demise and accepts his challenge to a duel. Shay and Yuya quickly exchange blows with their new monsters, Raidraptor - Final Fortress Falcon and Odd-Eyes Lancer Dragon, respectively. Yuya manages to win by using a Odd-Eyes Lancer Dragon's damage halving ability in conjunction with a trap card to inflict damage on both himself and Shay. Despite being defeated, Shay reveals that he briefly sensed Yuto within Yuya, which gave him hope that Lulu may still exist within Ray. Jack suddenly appears and tells Yuya he will not be able save anyone in his current state.
146	47	"One Way Street to Defeat" / Dimension Highway; Transliteration: "Dimenshon Haiwei" (Japanese: ディメンション・ハイウェイ)	Kang-Min Lee Animation director: Lee Sung-jin, Kim Hye-jeong	Tsutomu Kamishiro	Ryūta Yamamoto	March 12, 2017	April 28, 2018	December 8, 2018
Jack reveals to everyone that Yuya is afraid to summon the other three dragons he received from his counterparts. Yuya admits it out of concern for Riley's well-being while expressing his intent to save the baby without the dragons' power. Declan reveals that Yuya's last two matches had no impact on Riley. He activates the Dimension Highway duel course installed in the Arc-V remains so everyone can watch the Turbo Duel between Yuya and Jack. Despite placing himself at a grave disadvantage, Yuya still refused to use the dragons as they might hasten Zarc's return with grave consequences for Ray and her incarnations. Yuto, Yugo, and Yuri finally make their presence known to Yuya. They urge him to hear their dragons' true feelings and help him remember Zarc's ability to communicate with Duel Monster Spirits. Yuya finally summons the four dragons and learns the dragons' desire to be merged is not of Zarc's will but from their own fear of Ray. Yuya calms the four dragons with the intent to show them that they are strong as they are without the need to become Supreme King Z-ARC.
147	48	"One Last Duel" / The Unleashed Dragons; Transliteration: "Tokihanatareta Doragon" (Japanese: 解き放たれたドラゴン)	Kimiharu Muto Animation director: Yuya Kawamura	Tsutomu Kamishiro	Katsumi Ono	March 19, 2017	April 29, 2018	December 15, 2018
Yuya uses the four dragons to start his counterattack against Jack. Responding to Yuya's feelings, the four dragons aid Yuya in defeating Jack. Even after defeating Jack, who tells him that he is still lacking something, Yuya learns from Declan that Z-ARC's soul still remains inside Riley and had started to stir. After Yuya is promoted to Senior Class by Declan, he is allowed to take the Professional Duelist test. Yuya requests to take the Professional Duelist test right away with Declan as his opponent. Yuya once again summons the four dragons on his first turn to fight against Declan's trio of D/D/D Doom King Armageddons. He coordinates the four dragons to retrieve Action Cards to survive Declan's attacks. The happiness Yuya felt from understanding the dragons causes him to experience one of Zarc's memories. From seeing Zarc as one of the first Dueltainers who wanted to entertain for sake of making others smile, Yuya realizes that Zarc was not truly evil at heart and his true wish is to give people happiness. Regardless, Yuya finds Declan summoning his three D/D/D Superdoom King Armageddon monsters to counter the four dragons.
148	49	"That's a Wrap!" / The Miracle Drawn by the Pendulum; Transliteration: "Pendyuramu ga Egaku Kiseki" (Japanese: ペンデュラムが描く奇跡)	Masahiro Takada Animation director: Yûko Ebara, Akemi Yokota	Tsutomu Kamishiro	Katsumi Ono	March 26, 2017	May 5, 2018	December 15, 2018
Declan destroyed the four dragons with his Superdoom King's special abilities. With Yuto, Yugo, and Yuri's support, Yuya performs Fusion, Synchro, and Xyz summons to summon Odd-Eyes Venom Dragon, Odd-Eyes Wing Dragon, and Odd-Eyes Rebellion Dragon in that order. He manages to deal considerable damage to Declan, but he failed to destroy his monsters. Yuya uses the Pendulum ability of Performapal Five-Rainbow Magician to make both of their monsters' attack points go zero and only by placing five Action Cards on the field face down, the monsters' attack points would be doubled. Yuya and Declan begin racing who can place five Action Cards face down first by picking Action Cards. Yuya succeeded in place the five Action Cards ahead, but Declan also activates his D/D Savant Einstein's special ability to place his last Action Card face down and doubled his monsters' attack points that overpowers Yuya's. Already anticipating this, Yuya uses his monster's Pendulum ability to increase Odd-Eyes' attack points for each Pendulum Monster on his field. With Odd-Eyes' effect doubling the damage, Yuya defeats Declan. Yuya's Dueltaining pacifies Zarc's soul and allows Riley to smile. Ray reacts to the Dueltainment and transports Yuya's friends across dimensions to the Pendulum Dimension, where she is finally revived as Zuzu, with her other reincarnations residing within her, and reunites with Yuya. In addition, the four dimensions are reunited into one dimension once more; symbolically by Yuya's Dueltaining making everyone smile. Yusho challenges Yuya to a duel because Yuya has officially become a professional duelist. As Yuya accepts his father's challenge, Yuya declares he will continue bringing smiles with his dueling and surpass his father as a Dueltainer.
