= Yu-Gi-Oh! VRAINS season 1 =

Yu-Gi-Oh! VRAINS
- Season 1
- No. of episodes: 46 (44 Dubbed)

Release
- Original network: TV Tokyo
- Original release: May 10, 2017 – April 4, 2018

Season chronology
- ← Previous; Yu-Gi-Oh! Arc-V; Season 3 Next → Season 2

Yu-Gi-Oh! VRAINS is the fifth main spin-off anime series in the Yu-Gi-Oh! franchise and the ninth anime series overall. It is produced by Gallop and broadcast by TV Tokyo. The series is directed by Masahiro Hosoda. The series follows Yusaku Fujiki. It takes place in a high school environment in Den City. The series features Charisma Duelists who use VR and are similar to YouTubers. The show's theme is "Let's take one step forward and try it!" This season focuses on Yusaku's battles against the Knights of Hanoi to uncover the truth behind the "Lost Incident". This season uses three pieces of theme music. From episodes 1–46, the first opening theme is "With The Wind" (With(ウィズ) The(ザ) Wind(ウィンド), Wizu Za Windo) by Hiroaki "Tommy" Tominaga. From episodes 1–24, the first ending theme is "Believe In Magic" (Believe(ビリーブ) In(イン) Magic(マジック), Birību In Majikku) by Royga. From episodes 25–46, the second ending theme is "Writing Life" by Goodbye Holiday.

The English dub of the season aired on Teletoon in Canada from September 2018 to February 2019. In the United States the season aired on Pluto TV from November 7, 2020, to May 8, 2021

== Episode list ==
No.	English dub title / Japanese translated title	Written by	Original release date	English air date	American air date
1	"Link into the VRAINS" / My Name Is Playmaker; Transliteration: "Ore no Na wa Pureimēkā" (Japanese: 俺の名はPlaymaker)	Shin Yoshida	May 10, 2017	March 11, 2018 (U.S. theatres); September 1, 2018 (television)	November 7, 2020
Den City is where the newest network technology known as LINK VRAINS was developed. It is a cyberspace managed by SOL Technologies. Yusaku Fujiki is a cool student with excellent observation abilities. In order to defeat a group that plans to ruin the LINK VRAINS, the Knights of Hanoi, he transforms into his avatar known as Playmaker and duels them. One day, Yusaku obtains information that both SOL Technologies and the Knights of Hanoi are desperately searching for a mysterious life form known as Ignis. With the help of a hacker that shares Yusaku's goals named Cal Kolter, Yusaku manages to capture Ignis and store it inside his duel disk to be used as leverage against the Knights of Hanoi.
2	"Seize The Wind!" / Seize the Wind! Storm Access; Transliteration: "Kaze o Tsukame! Sutōmu Akusesu" (Japanese: 風を掴め！Storm Access)	Shin Yoshida	May 17, 2017	September 2, 2018	November 14, 2020
Yusaku manages to capture Ignis as he chases after the Knights of Hanoi. In order to defeat them, he logs into LINK VRAINS as Playmaker. He starts a duel and holds Ignis hostage, but Ignis predicts that Playmaker cannot win with his deck due to Knights of Hanoi's Cracking Dragon. One of the Knights of Hanoi faces Playmaker in a "speed duel" for possession of Ignis. At a disadvantage due to the Knights of Hanoi's Cracking Dragon, Playmaker obtains a new Link Monster, Decode Talker, by using his skill, Storm Access, that is granted by Ignis. He uses it to win the duel.
3	"Contact" / First Contact; Transliteration: "Fāsuto Kontakuto" (Japanese: ファースト・コンタクト)	Shin Yoshida	May 24, 2017	September 8, 2018	November 21, 2020
After his victory over one of the Knights of Hanoi, Playmaker becomes a hot topic among the city and a target of both the Knights of Hanoi and SOL Technologies. The head of security at SOL Technologies, Akira Zaizen, asks Emma Bessho to dig up information about Playmaker. He also reaches out to the number one ranked celebrity duelist, George Gore, to duel Playmaker and take Ignis from him. Gore refuses his request. Meanwhile, Yusaku and Kolter decide to name the Ignis, "Ai", and they try to decipher Ai's programs. While doing so, they learn about Varis, who is the leader of the Knights of Hanoi.
4	"Pain and Gain" / Charisma Duelist Go Onizuka; Transliteration: "Karisuma Dyuerisuto: Gō Onizuka" (Japanese: カリスマデュエリスト Go鬼塚)	Junki Takegami	May 31, 2017	September 9, 2018	November 28, 2020
Wanting to win back not only his popularity but also the smiles of the children at the orphanage where he grew up, George Gore decides to take up Akira's offer of dueling Playmaker. In LINK VRAINS, Gore disguises himself as one of the Knights of Hanoi to lure him out. When Yusaku logs in as Playmaker and takes the bait, he is trapped into a speed duel with Gore. As part of his beat down dueling style, Gore purposely takes a large amount of damage. He Link Summons his ace monster, Gouki the Great Ogre, and prepares to finish Playmaker in one turn.
5	"Down for the Count" / The Three Count Rings; Transliteration: "Meidō no Surī Kaunto" (Japanese: 鳴動のスリーカウント)	Junki Takegami	June 7, 2017	September 15, 2018	December 5, 2020
Despite taking a large amount of damage and Kolter creating an escape route for Playmaker, he decides to continue the duel. After consecutive Link Summons, Playmaker brings out Decode Talker and has it face George Gore's Great Ogre in a clash between aces. Gore used up all of his monsters that caused him unable to activate Great Ogre's effect. This allowed Playmaker to deliver the finishing blow. Although Playmaker wins the duel, Gore is once again revered as a champion to the children of the orphanage.
6	"True Blue" / Idol!! Blue Angel; Transliteration: "Aidoru!! Burū Enjeru" (Japanese: アイドル！！ブルーエンジェル)	Atsushi Maekawa	June 14, 2017	September 16, 2018	December 12, 2020
Believing that SOL Technologies has leads to his lost memories and Kolter's brother, Yusaku tries to approach Skye Zaizen, who is Akira's younger sister-in-law. Unbeknownst to him, the Zaizen siblings are distant from each other as Akira disapproves of Skye engaging in speed duels. To prove herself to Akira, Skye logs into LINK VRAINS as her avatar, the idol celebrity duelist Blue Angel, and publicly challenges Playmaker. However, she is approached by Varis' right-hand man, Specter, who gives her a card that will unlock her deepest desires. The next day, Ai tricks both Yusaku and Skye into dueling each other after sensing the presence of a Knight of Hanoi's card in Skye's deck.
7	"Fallen Angel" / Hanoi's Angel; Transliteration: "Hanoi no Tenshi" (Japanese: ハノイの天使)	Atsushi Maekawa	June 21, 2017	September 22, 2018	December 12, 2020
The speed duel between Playmaker and Blue Angel begins. With her Trickstar deck, Blue Angel slowly whittles away Playmaker's life points. When Blue Angel is forced to use the card that Specter gave her, it causes her to go berserk. To prevent her from taking any more mental damage, Playmaker wins the duel with his newly acquired Link Monster known as Encode Talker.
8	"A Storm is Coming" / Controller of the Wind; Transliteration: "Kaze o Ayatsurishi Mono" (Japanese: 風を操りし者)	Shin Yoshida	July 5, 2017	September 23, 2018	December 19, 2020
As a result from using the Knights of Hanoi card, Skye becomes infected by a virus and falls into a coma. According to Ai, the Knights of Hanoi should have a antivirus program that can save her. A fake Blue Angel appears in LINK VRAINS and challenges Playmaker. When Yusaku logs in and confronts her, he gets caught in a trap. After the fake Blue Angel reveals herself as Ghost Gal, Emma Bessho's avatar, it is revealed that the trap was planned by Akira Zaizen, who suspects Playmaker is the perpetrator behind Skye's incident. Varis appears before them and demonstrates his power to control data storms. After telling Akira that the Knights of Hanoi is responsible for Skye's coma, Varis gives him an ultimatum. Akira can either retrieve the Ignis from Playmaker but lose the chance to save Skye, or let Playmaker duel him and get the antivirus program if Playmaker wins. Akira chooses the latter option and lets Playmaker go.
9	"Malicious Mayhem" / Enemy I was Seeking; Transliteration: "Oimotometekita Teki" (Japanese: 追い求めてきた敵)	Shin Yoshida	July 12, 2017	September 29, 2018	December 19, 2020
The speed duel between Playmaker and Varis begins. Varis summons Cracking Dragon on the first turn, but Playmaker beats it with Decode Talker. However, Varis shows that he also has Playmaker's skill, Storm Access, and uses it to gain a new Link Monster named Topologic Bomber Dragon. With it, Varis destroys Decode Talker and is on the verge of defeating Playmaker.
10	"Eye of the Storm" / Impact! Cyberse Vanishes; Transliteration: "Shōgeki! Saibāsu Shōshitsu" (Japanese: 衝撃！サイバース消失)	Shin Yoshida	July 19, 2017	September 30, 2018	January 16, 2021
Playmaker manages to avoid defeat using his trap card. To overpower Topologic Bomber Dragon, Playmaker and Ai resort to using Storm Access from a bigger data storm. Before Playmaker can summon his new Link Monster, Varis activates a trap card that combines with his dragon's effect to end the speed duel with a draw. Varis pulls Playmaker into the center of the data storm, where they continue their fight in a master duel so they can use their skills to the fullest. However, Varis corners Playmaker with the effect of his field spell card, Fire Prison, that treats his Cyberse monsters as nonexistent. This causes Ai to disappear as well.
11	"Neutralized" / Roar of the Magazine Borreload; Transliteration: "Todoroku Dansō Varerurōdo" (Japanese: 轟く弾倉 ヴァレルロード)	Shin Yoshida	July 26, 2017	October 6, 2018	January 16, 2021
Varis tells Playmaker that Ai is an AI program with free will that created Cyberse. It is the Knights of Hanoi's mission to destroy Ai and Cyberse. Varis Link Summons his ace monster, Borreload Dragon, and deals heavy damage to Playmaker. Nonetheless, Playmaker believes his Cyberse monsters are still present. Playmaker Link Summons the monster he obtained in the previous duel: Firewall Dragon. In doing so, the Fire Prison is destroyed. Ai returns to Playmaker.
12	"Link the Circuit" / Impregnable Defending Dragon Firewall; Transliteration: "Teppeki no Shugoryū Faiawōru" (Japanese: 鉄壁の守護竜ファイアウォール)	Shin Yoshida	August 2, 2017	October 7, 2018	January 16, 2021
Despite Playmaker's strategies to destroy Borreload Dragon, Varis counters each of them. Just as the situation seems hopeless, Playmaker states his reasons for winning this duel and reveals his involvement in a certain incident 10 years ago that Varis knows about. Playmaker manages to attack with his powered-up Firewall Dragon to defeat Varis. Ai takes this chance to eat a part of his data. Although Varis escapes, he gives Playmaker the antivirus program as promised. Playmaker uses the antivirus program on Skye, which allows her to log out and awaken from her coma. Later, Yusaku and Kolter learn that the data Ai had taken from Varis contained the rest of his full body.
13	"Playback" / Battle Record; Transliteration: "Gekitō no Kiroku" (Japanese: 激闘の記録)	Shin Yoshida	August 9, 2017	October 13, 2018	N/A
Ghost Gal holds an interview with two reporters recalling Playmaker's battles against the Knights of Hanoi. The reporters intend to release this information as news, but Yusaku deletes it before they could do so. The first of many recap / clipshow episodes.
14	"An Invitation" / Ghost Girl's Invitation; Transliteration: "Gōsuto Gāru no Sasoi" (Japanese: ゴーストガールの誘い)	Junki Takegami	August 16, 2017	October 14, 2018	January 23, 2021
Ghost Gal challenges Playmaker to a speed duel. If Ghost Gal wins then she will get Ai. If Playmaker wins then she will give him a backdoor program to SOL Tech's data bank to look for information about the incident ten years ago. With her Altergeist deck, Ghost Gal prepares to defeat Playmaker in one turn.
15	"Camouflaged Chaos" / Altergeist that Hides in the Darkness; Transliteration: "Yami ni Shinobu Orutāgaisuto" (Japanese: 闇に忍ぶオルターガイスト)	Junki Takegami	August 23, 2017	October 20, 2018	January 23, 2020
After stopping Ghost Gal's one turn kill, Playmaker continues the back and forth duel. Although Ghost Gal tries to stop Playmaker from using his Storm Access skill, he still manages to do so. While in a Data Storm, Ghost Gal falls off her duel board, but Playmaker saves her. He Link Summons his newly-obtained Excode Talker and defeats her with it. As promised, Ghost Gal gives the backdoor program to Playmaker.
16	"Hack Attack" / Infiltrate SOL's Cyber Fortress; Transliteration: "Sen'nyū Soru Den'nō Yōsai" (Japanese: 潜入SOL電脳要塞)	Atsushi Maekawa	August 30, 2017	October 21, 2018	January 30, 2021
Using the backdoor program, Playmaker hacks into SOL Tech's mother computer to get into the data bank. Although he avoids the computer's security traps, he gets caught off-guard when a data storm emerges. SOL Tech's new security manager, Kitamura, becomes alerted of Playmaker's presence and sends two of his Prototype AI duelists, A and B, to face him. Playmaker separates the two and engages Prototype A in a speed duel. With its Tentacluster deck, Prototype A discards every card in Playmaker's hand on the first turn. When Prototype B catches up with the two and tries to take Playmaker's duel disk, Blue Angel suddenly appears and stops it. Meanwhile, Ghost Gal and Akira begin their infiltration into SOL Tech's data bank.
17	"Blue's Back!" / Flawless A.I. Duelist; Transliteration: "Kanzen Muketsu no Ēai Dyuerisuto" (Japanese: 完全無欠のAIデュエリスト)	Atsushi Maekawa	September 6, 2017	October 27, 2018	January 30, 2021
Blue Angel conducts a speed duel with Prototype B. Both continuously deal effect damage to each other, but Blue Angel ultimately wins. Meanwhile, Playmaker uses his discarded cards' effects from the graveyard to mount a comeback. After using Storm Access, he Link Summons his new Link Monster, Vector Square Archfiend, and defeats Prototype A with it. When Playmaker reaches the data bank, Akira awaits him.
18	"Dueling for Answers" / Wound Into His Heart; Transliteration: "Mune ni Kizumareta Kizu" (Japanese: 胸に刻まれた傷)	Shin Yoshida	September 13, 2017	October 28, 2018	February 6, 2021
Already seeing the information relating to the incident from ten years ago, Akira tries to stop Playmaker from learning the truth through a master duel.
19	"The Lost Incident" / Incident Buried in Darkness; Transliteration: "Yami ni Hōmurareshi Jiken" (Japanese: 闇に葬られし事件)	Shin Yoshida	September 20, 2017	November 3, 2018	February 6, 2021
As the duel continues, Akira starts talking about the Lost Incident from ten years ago in which six children, including Playmaker, were kidnapped. Playmaker goes on to say how he was imprisoned and forced to duel in simulations every day. He was punished for losing. In spite of the harsh conditions, there was a mysterious voice that helped him keep his will to live. It was not until six months later that he and the other children were rescued. Despite going through therapy, Playmaker was still deeply scarred by the incident. He decided to exact revenge and find the truth behind it all. Playmaker reveals that the Lost Incident is also known as the Knights of Hanoi Project, which implies that the Knights of Hanoi were involved. Additionally, Akira states that the name of the mastermind behind the Knights of Hanoi Project is in SOL Tech's data bank.
20	"A Piece of the Puzzle" / Unyielding Justice; Transliteration: "Yuzurenai Seigi" (Japanese: ゆずれない正義)	Shin Yoshida	September 27, 2017	November 4, 2018	February 13, 2021
Despite Akira's pleas, Playmaker keeps on with his resolve to enact revenge on those responsible for the Knights of Hanoi Project with his own hands. The duel finally concludes with Playmaker's win. Yusaku returns with the data stolen from SOL Technologies. Yusaku analyzes it with Kolter's help. They discover the name of the mastermind of the Knights of Hanoi Project, Dr. Kiyoshi Kogami, who was a SOL Tech researcher that officially died seven years ago. Yusaku and Kolter do not know that Kogami is still alive. Kogami is working with the Knights of Hanoi in the next stage of his plan to destroy LINK VRAINS for good.
21	"Story Time" / Embers of a New Battle; Transliteration: "Aratana Tatakai no Hidane" (Japanese: 新たな闘いの火種)	Shin Yoshida	October 4, 2017	November 10, 2018	N/A
At Yusaku's apartment, Ai tells Yusaku's robot housekeeper, Roboppy, about the recent events. Meanwhile, Yusaku and Kolter conclude that their only lead to the truth behind the Lost Incident is Varis. The second recap / clipshow episode of the series.
22	"The Deleted" / Blackened Sun; Transliteration: "Shikkoku ni Somaru Nichirin" (Japanese: 漆黒に染まる日輪)	Shōji Yonemura	October 11, 2017	November 11, 2018	February 13, 2021
Yusaku learns about "The Deleted", which refers to a person who would get forcefully logged into LINK VRAINS but be unable to log out. Reminiscent of what happened to Skye, this would leave the victim's real-world body in a comatose state. After looking up information on the victims with Kolter, Yusaku deduces that whoever is responsible is targeting Playmaker. Yusaku tries to approach the next likely victim, McKendrick Kilabocker, but he is too late. He sees McKendrick in LINK VRAINS get infected with a virus and turned into Deleted by Dr. Genome, who is a member of the Knights of Hanoi. The Gore appears and confronts Genome, who proposes for Gore to join the Knights of Hanoi's hunt for Playmaker and receive the antivirus program in return, but he refuses. After Genome leaves, Gore takes McKendrick to the hospital, where he talks about his past with McKendrick and also meets Yusaku. Later, three Knights of Hanoi attack people in LINK VRAINS and turn them into Deleted. Just as Yusaku decides to log in to stop them, a fake Playmaker appears and defeats the three Knights of Hanoi. When Genome shows up, the fake is revealed to be Gore, who challenges Genome to a speed duel. If the Gore wins then Genome will give him the Deleted antivirus program. However, if Genome wins then Gore will reveal Playmaker's true identity.
23	"A Grim Tale" / Genome's Giant; Transliteration: "Genomu no Kyojin" (Japanese: ゲノムの巨人)	Shōji Yonemura	October 18, 2017	November 17, 2018	February 20, 2021
The speed duel between the Gore and Genome begins. After his loss to Playmaker, Gore reveals his adaptation to fighting like a heel. Despite the Gore's new style, Genome's Helixx deck pushes him into a corner, which prompts Yusaku to step in.
24	"To Gore Or Not To Gore" / Dark Mask's Burden of Fate; Transliteration: "Dāku Masuku ga Seou Shukumei" (Japanese: ダークマスクが背負う宿命)	Shōji Yonemura, Atsushi Maekawa	October 25, 2017	November 18, 2018	February 20, 2021
Yusaku logs in as Playmaker and taunts the Gore in an attempt to fire him up. This inspires Gore to discard his heel persona and become a hero again. He Link Summons Gouki the Master Ogre and defeats Genome with it. Gore gets the antivirus removal program for McKendrick. Afterwards, Playmaker and Gore team up and defend LINK VRAINS from the Knights of Hanoi while trying to find out who made the Deleted virus. Later, a large-scale war erupts between the Knights of Hanoi and an army of AI duelists created by SOL Tech's Kitamura. Although it seems like the AI duelists were winning, two Knights of Hanoi wipe them all out. Meanwhile, Skye is conflicted on whether she should join the fight against the Knights of Hanoi or stay out of LINK VRAINS like Akira wants her to do.
25	"Suture the Circuit" / Virus Deck Operation; Transliteration: "Wirusu Dekki Operēshon" (Japanese: ウィルスデッキ・オペレーション)	Atsushi Maekawa	November 1, 2017	November 24, 2018	February 27, 2021
Knowing that Skye is lost on what to do, Emma appears before her. She tells Skye that she should stop being Blue Angel and do whatever makes her happy in a passive-aggressive manner. This infuriates Skye to the point that she logs into LINK VRAINS and challenges whoever she comes across to a duel. She ends up facing a prominent Knight of Hanoi and the creator of the Deleted virus, Baira, in a speed duel. Blue Angel gains an early lead, but she soon gets pressured by Baira's Virus deck. In the midst of all this, Yusaku notices a suspicious person while looking through video footage of the Deleted victims.
26	"Diagnosis: Deletion" / Three Draws Leading to Hope; Transliteration: "Kibō o Michibiku Surī Dorō" (Japanese: 希望を導くスリー・ドロー)	Atsushi Maekawa	November 8, 2017	November 25, 2018	February 27, 2021
Yusaku looks up information on that suspicious person and learns that it is Dr. Clarissa Turner, which is Baira's true identity. Meanwhile, Baira continues to put pressure on Blue Angel. Despite the odds, Blue Angel Link Summons Trickstar Bella Madonna, turns Baira's virus effects against her, and wins the duel. Blue Angel's strong belief in herself changes Baira's heart into using the Deleted virus removal program on all the victims, which cures them all. In the real world, Yusaku and Kolter prepare to confront Dr. Turner as she logs out, but they soon learn that Varis has already purged her.
27	"The Brave Battler" / Shima Naoki the Fighter; Transliteration: "Tatakau Otoko, Shima Naoki" (Japanese: 闘う男、島直樹闘う男、島直樹)	Mitsutaka Hirota	November 15, 2017	December 1, 2018	March 6, 2021
Yusaku's classmate, Shima Naoki, wants to join in the fight against the Knights of Hanoi, but he is too scared to actually do so. Mysteriously, Shima receives the Cyberse Wizard card used by Playmaker. Along with it comes a message telling him to "be one with the Cyberse", which he assumes is from Playmaker. Believing he was chosen by Playmaker, Shima logs into LINK VRAINS for the first time. He is astounded by the virtual reality experience. However, Shima quickly finds himself in a master duel against a Knight of Hanoi. Calling himself "Lonely Brave" (and later "Brave Max"), Shima manages to win using Cyberse Wizard. The next day, a Knight of Hanoi, Faust, kidnaps Shima and uses him as bait to draw out Playmaker.
28	"Bugging Out" / Final Commander of the Three Knights; Transliteration: "Sankishi, Saigo no Shō" (Japanese: 三騎士、最後の将三騎士、最後の将)	Mitsutaka Hirota	November 22, 2017	December 2, 2018	March 6, 2021
Playmaker arrives to save Brave Max and accuses Faust as the one who stole Cyberse Wizard's card data to set up Brave Max to lure him out. However, Faust is oblivious to Playmaker's accusation, and the two engage in a speed duel. Faust seals Playmaker's means to Link Summon with his Motor Worm deck. However, Playmaker counters Faust's combo and uses Storm Access to gain a new Link Monster, Powercode Talker. Before Playmaker lands the final blow, Faust tries to tell him the truth about Ai, but he fails to do so. In the real world, Yusaku finds and saves Shima, but he could not find Faust. Yusaku wonders if Ai was the one who sent Cyberse Wizard's card data to Shima. At Dr. Clarissa Turner's room, Varis takes a hidden camera that recorded Yusaku, Ai, and Kolter in her room after Baira was defeated in LINK VRAINS. Varis learns Yusaku is Playmaker.
29	"Kolter's Khronicles" / Kusanagi Report; Transliteration: "Kusanagi Repōto" (Japanese: クサナギレポートクサナギレポート)	Atsushi Maekawa	November 29, 2017	December 8, 2018	March 13, 2021
In case something terrible happens to him, Kolter writes a report detailing his and Yusaku's fight against the Knights of Hanoi. Elsewhere, Varis prepares the Tower of Hanoi. The third recap / clipshow episode of the series.
30	"Under VRAINS" / Doorway to the Abyss; Transliteration: "Naraku e no Tobira" (Japanese: 奈落への扉奈落への扉)	Junki Takegami	December 6, 2017	December 9, 2018	March 13, 2021
Peace has seemingly returned to LINK VRAINS, but Yusaku's Link Sense makes him feel that something is wrong. He logs in to find the problem and runs into Ghost Gal. They enter LINK VRAINS' sewer and eventually split up. While Playmaker gets chased by a giant cyber monster, Ghost Gal finds a huge core in the data reprocessing plant. Varis appears and forces Ghost Gal into a speed duel.
31	"Showdown in the Sewers" / The Final Trigger; Transliteration: "Shūmatsu no Torigā" (Japanese: 終末のトリガー)	Junki Takegami	December 13, 2017	December 15, 2018	March 20, 2021
Varis Link Summons Topologic Bomber Dragon on his first turn, but Ghost Gal stops its attack and rids the field of it. Ghost Gal prepares to finish the duel, but Varis activates a trap to destroy all of her monsters. Varis activates Storm Access and gets a new Link Monster, Topologic Trisbaena, and uses it to defeat Ghost Gal. With the last of her strength, Ghost Gal gives important data to Playmaker. Ghost Gal gets turned into data and absorbed into the core, which turns into the Tower of Hanoi. Varis tells Playmaker that he must defeat him if he wants to stop the Tower of Hanoi.
32	"The Tower of Hanoi" / Tower of Hanoi; Transliteration: "Hanoi no Tō" (Japanese: ハノイの塔ハノイの塔)	Shōji Yonemura	December 20, 2017	December 16, 2018	March 20, 2021
With the construction of the Tower of Hanoi, the Knights of Hanoi have taken over LINK VRAINS. After analyzing the data left by Ghost Gal, Yusaku and Kolter learn that the Tower of Hanoi will be complete within six hours. Once there are six rings around the Tower of Hanoi, it will erase all computer data in SOL Technologies' system, which will cause widespread havoc and panic in the real world. In LINK VRAINS, knowing that SOL Tech will punish him for his failure, Kitamura reaches out to Varis and tries to team up with him. However, Varis has Specter defeat Kitamura in a duel and turn him into data for the Tower of Hanoi. Seeing this, Yusaku, George, and Skye log in and meet each other. After Playmaker tells Gore and Blue Angel about the situation, the trio splits up to find and beat Varis. Blue Angel comes across Specter and engages him in a master duel.
33	"Once Upon a Time" / Angel With Blue Tears; Transliteration: "Aoi Namida no Tenshi" (Japanese: 青い涙の天使青い涙の天使)	Shōji Yonemura	December 27, 2017	December 22, 2018	March 27, 2021
Blue Angel tries to beat Specter with her deadly Trickstar combo, but he sees through her plan and counters it. As they duel, Specter talks about how Blue Angel relates herself to a character from a book that is also called "Blue Angel". Similar to Skye in real life, the titular Blue Angel in the story is a lonely girl who gradually makes friends. Despite Specter playing mind games and taking control of her Trickstar Holly Angel, Blue Angel thinks of a way to win this master duel.
34	"Roots of Evil" / The Sacred Tree; Transliteration: "Seinaru Tenju" (Japanese: 聖なる天樹聖なる天樹)	Shōji Yonemura	January 10, 2018	December 23, 2018	March 27, 2021
After Specter briefly describes how he was alone and lost in a canyon as a kid, Blue Angel aims not only to win but also to save his soul. Despite Blue Angel's best efforts, Specter taunts Blue Angel in not being able to save him and defeats her.
35	"The Hollow" / Other Lost Incident; Transliteration: "Mō Hitotsu no Rosuto Jiken" (Japanese: もう一つのロスト事件もう一つのロスト事件)	Shin Yoshida	January 17, 2018	December 29, 2018	April 3, 2021
After Specter leaves the unconscious Blue Angel, Akira logs in to save her. However, he gets trapped in a thorn cage by Dr. Kogami, who reveals that SOL Tech tried to kill him with a computer virus. It was to not only cover up the Lost Incident but also to gain control of the Ignis that Dr. Kogami created. While Dr. Kogami's body is in a comatose state, his son, Varis, recreated his consciousness within LINK VRAINS. After telling Akira that the Ignis is a menace that must be destroyed, Dr. Kogami leaves him to watch Blue Angel be turned into data for the Tower of Hanoi. Elsewhere, Playmaker confronts Specter in a master duel. Specter reveals that he was one of the six kidnapped children from the Lost Incident. Unlike Playmaker, who was traumatized by the incident, Specter enjoyed his time in captivity. Since he was a lonely orphan who never felt wanted, Specter believed he was needed for the first time in his life through the Lost Incident. Specter would eventually meet Varis and dedicate his life to him.
36	"A Bridge Too Far" / Useless Justice; Transliteration: "Kudaranai Seigi" (Japanese: くだらない正義くだらない正義)	Mitsutaka Hirota	January 24, 2018	December 30, 2018	April 3, 2021
The master duel between Playmaker and Specter continues. Just as Playmaker manages to counter Specter's Sunavalon strategies, he shows him an image of Akira in the thorn cage. If Specter takes any damage then the thorns will grow. If Akira touches the thorns then he will get infected with a computer virus. With Akira being held hostage, Playmaker is forced on the defensive.
37	"Out on a Limb" / My Mother Tree; Transliteration: "Waga Hahanaru Ju" (Japanese: 我が母なる樹我が母なる樹)	Mitsutaka Hirota	January 31, 2018	January 5, 2019	April 10, 2021
Playmaker taunts Specter and tricks him into attacking, which also allows Playmaker to destroy his ace monster. However, Specter retaliates by summoning the stronger Sunavalon. With Akira still being held hostage, Playmaker is unable to attack. Kolter tries to log out Akira with his program, but it still paled in comparison to the virus. Not wanting Skye's sacrifice to go in vain and becoming a burden, Akira sacrifices himself by letting the virus infect him but not before encouraging Playmaker to follow through his conviction. With Akira gone, Playmaker no longer hesitates and uses his Excode Talker to finish off Specter. However, on his way to the other side, the bridge that the two were dueling on collapses.
38	"Looking Back" / Hanoi's Recollection; Transliteration: "Hanoi no Tsuisō" (Japanese: ハノイの追想)	Junki Takegami	February 7, 2018	January 6, 2019	April 10, 2021
After Specter's defeat, Varis recounts what had happened that begins with his attempt to destroy the Ignis five years ago up to the current events. It is revealed that Varis has found out Yusaku's identity as Playmaker, but he is hiding this from his father for unknown reasons. The fourth recap / clipshow episode of the series.
39	"Ring the Bell" / Bullet Buried in Darkness; Transliteration: "Yami ni Hōmuru Dangan" (Japanese: 闇に葬る弾丸)	Atsushi Maekawa	February 14, 2018	January 12, 2019	April 17, 2021
Playmaker gets saved from the bridge collapsing by a random data storm and continues his trek towards the Tower of Hanoi. Playmaker sees the Gore facing Varis in a master duel. When Gore tries to attack with four Gouki Link Monsters, Varis counters by activating the Mirror Force trap card that he used against Ghost Gal to destroy all of them and leaves Gore's field barren.
40	"Gore at War" / Thirst for Victory; Transliteration: "Shōri e no Katsubō" (Japanese: 勝利への渇望勝利への渇望)	Atsushi Maekawa	February 21, 2018	January 13, 2019	April 17, 2021
Despite all of Gore's monsters that got destroyed by Mirror Force, the Gore is still determined to defeat Varis. Gore Link summons Gouki Jet Ogre to force Varis' monsters into attack position and revives his monsters to summon Gouki the Great Ogre that is able to reduce most of Varis' life points. However, Varis Link summons his new dragon, Borrelsword Dragon. Using Metalrokket Dragon's effect, Borrelsword Dragon is able to attack twice and destroys Gore's Gouki the Great Ogre. The Gore is defeated and entrusts the rest to Playmaker as he becomes deleted.
41	"Truth and Consequences" / Deceitful Truth; Transliteration: "Azamukareta Jijitsu" (Japanese: 欺かれた事実欺かれた事実)	Junki Takegami	February 28, 2018	January 19, 2019	April 24, 2021
Playmaker and Varis commence the speed duel around the Tower of Hanoi. During the duel, Varis reveals that Ai has been lying to Playmaker all this time about being amnesiac as the data the Knights of Hanoi have recovered does not contain Ai's memories like Ai has claimed. He also reveals that the Ignis AIs are modeled after the six children who were kidnapped. Ai is modeled after Playmaker. Ai tries to reason with Playmaker, but Playmaker does not care as he just wants to achieve his revenge. Despite having anticipated Varis' Mirror Force by placing his monsters in defense position, Varis is able to force them back into attack position and uses Mirror Force to destroy them.
42	"Storm Access" / Stardust Road's Guidance; Transliteration: "Sutādasuto Rōdo no Michibiki" (Japanese: スターダストロードの導き)	Junki Takegami	March 7, 2018	January 20, 2019	April 24, 2021
Playmaker is cornered by Varis and barely survives his attack. To make it worse, the debris from the Tower of Hanoi also nearly hit him several times. Knowing he needs to use Storm Access to turn the tide, Playmaker attempts to enter the data storm, but it only injures him until Ai finally interferes to help by using himself to steer the board. Ai creates a barrier to protect Playmaker within the data storm. This allows Playmaker to use his skill to gain a new monster, Transcode Talker, that is able to corner Varis in turn. Varis attempts to use his skill as well and fails until Dr. Kogami sacrifices himself to create a path so that Varis can use his skill safely. This allows Varis to summon Topologic Gumblar Dragon. Realizing his father is dying, Varis forces the duel to end in a draw, which blows himself and Playmaker away.
43	"The Reveal" / Birth of the Ignis; Transliteration: "Igunisu no Tanjō" (Japanese: イグニスの誕生イグニスの誕生)	Shin Yoshida	March 14, 2018	January 26, 2019	May 1, 2021
The backlash from Varis' last attack forced Yusaku to log out. Having figured out Varis' true identity, Yusaku and Kolter confront Varis' real life identity, Roken Kogami, at his house. Roken reveals his father has passed away to save him. He explains that his father created the Ignis in an attempt to create humanity's successor, which started the Lost Incident. The Ignis created the Cyberse World and Cyberse monsters. However, after many tests through virtual simulations, he deems the Ignis would eventually become humanity's enemies and made it his goal to erase them. Finally recognizing Roken as the one who saved him when he was imprisoned 10 years ago, Yusaku tries to convince Roken to find another path. Roken insists on continuing the plan due to his distrust in AIs. Without any choice, Yusaku and Roken return to Link VRAINS, which begins their final duel.
44	"Illusion of Hope" / Prisoner of Destiny; Transliteration: "Unmei no Shūjin" (Japanese: 運命の囚人運命の囚人)	Shin Yoshida, Masaaki Tachihara	March 21, 2018	January 27, 2019	May 1, 2021
Varis activates his permanent trap named Link Turret that places Rokket Counter in anticipation that Playmaker has found a way to counter his Mirror Force strategy. Playmaker summons Transcode Talker, Powercode Talker, and Excode Talker to defeat Varis in a one-turn-kill. Unfortunately, this backfires when Varis activates Link Turret's effect to summon Borreload Dragon. Varis uses the combination of its effect together with Topologic Bomber Dragon and his other Rokket monsters to take control of Playmaker's Transcode Talker. Varis uses Transcode Talker to destroy Powercode Talker.
45	"Standing Tall" / Duel in the Extreme Domain; Transliteration: "Kyokugen Ryōiki no Dyueru" (Japanese: 極限領域のデュエル極限領域のデュエル)	Shin Yoshida, Masaaki Tachihara	March 28, 2018	February 2, 2019	May 8, 2021
Varis continues to corner Playmaker by summoning Borreload Dragon and Borrelsword Dragon. He removes Mirror Force and reveals his new ace card, Topologic Gumblar Dragon, that he summoned in the second extra monster zone by mutually linking the two extra monster zones. Using its effect, Revolver intends to inflict 3000 points of damage to Playmaker as long as he has cards in his hand. Playmaker barely survived using his permanent trap to halve the damage and prevents both of them from attacking until four turns have passed. Despite heavily injured with only 50 life points remaining, Ai's encouragement reignites Playmaker's spirit to continue and win the duel.
46	"Link to the Future" / The Circuit That Draws the Future; Transliteration: "Mirai o Egakidasu Sākitto" (Japanese: 未来を描き出すサーキット)	Shin Yoshida, Masaaki Tachihara	April 4, 2018	February 3, 2019	May 8, 2021
As the Tower of Hanoi is on the verge of completion, Playmaker and Ai counter Varis' near-perfect tactic by copying the effect of Mirror Force. Already anticipating this, Varis used his extra linked Topologic Gumblar Dragon that stopped his dragons from being destroyed. Using various combinations of his spell and trap cards, Playmaker brought out Transcode Talker and Powercode Talker. Finally, using Encode Talker and Swap Cleric, Playmaker Link Summoned Firewall Dragon. With three of his monsters co-linked, Playmaker expanded the extra link. Playmaker drew his final card, Zero Extra Link, which boosted the attack of Transcode Talker equal to the number of co-linked monsters times 800. Varis attempted to stop Playmaker by preventing his co-linked monsters from attacking. However, Playmaker used his Link Monsters to summon Decode Talker, who was unaffected by Varis' trap card. Due to Zero Extra Link, the attack increase of Transcode Talker was passed onto Decode Talker. This allows Playmaker to finally defeat Varis. With Varis' defeat, the Tower of Hanoi is destroyed and restores everyone who got absorbed into the tower. In real life, Roken leaves his house, but Yusaku is aware that he will eventually return to finish what he started as long as Ignis is still a danger to the world. As the Knights of Hanoi are no more, Yusaku frees Ai from his lock, and the two part ways.
