= Yu-Gi-Oh! Arc-V season 2 =

Yu-Gi-Oh! Arc-V
- Season 2
- Yuya Sakaki(left) with Jean-Michel Roget (Right)
- No. of episodes: 50

Release
- Original network: TV Tokyo
- Original release: April 5, 2015 – April 3, 2016

Season chronology
- ← Previous; Season 1 Next → Season 3

Yu-Gi-Oh! Arc-V is the fourth spin-off anime in the Yu-Gi-Oh! franchise and the eighth anime series overall. It is produced by Nihon Ad Systems and broadcast by TV Tokyo. It is directed by Katsumi Ono and produced by Studio Gallop. Its plot focuses on Yuya Sakaki. Yuya is a boy seeking to become the greatest entertainer in Action Duels who brings forth a new summoning method to Duel Monsters known as Pendulum Summoning. This season covers Yuya and his friends battling in the Synchro Dimension.

Four themes songs are used for this season: two openings and two endings. From episodes 50-75, the third opening theme is "Hanate" (ハナテ; lit. "Unleash") by Gekidan Niagara, while the third ending theme is "Arc of Smile!" by Boys And Men. From episodes 76-98, the fourth opening theme is "Kirifuda" (切り札; lit. "Trump Card") by Cinema Staff, while the fourth ending theme is "Speaking" by Mrs. GREEN APPLE. For the English dub version, the opening theme is "Can You Feel the Power".

The English dub premiered episodes in Canada and Australia on Teletoon and 9Go! respectively. In the United States, Nicktoons skipped the season entirely.

== Episode list ==
No. overall	No. in season	English dub title / Japanese translated title	Directed by	Written by	Storyboarded by	Original release date	English air date (Note: Section reflects the first-time airing of the English dub in either Canada or Australia.)
50	1	"Dueling Declan" / Lancers, The Chosen Warriors; Transliteration: "Ransāzu Erabareta Senshi" (Japanese: ランサーズ選ばれた戦士)	Kumiko Habara Animation director: Momoko Makiuchi	Tsutomu Kamishiro	Yukio Nishimoto	April 5, 2015	July 22, 2016 (Note: The English dub of Yu-Gi-Oh! Arc-V episodes 50–61 first premiered in Canada on Teletoon.)
Yuya is angered by hearing that the Battle Royal was just a testing ground to determine duelists worthy to become members of the Lancers. He fears that Zuzu had been caught just like the others. In his anger, Yuya challenges Declan to a duel. As Declan brings out his D/D/D Monsters, Celina talks to Shay, who confirms that everything Zuzu had told her about Duel Academy's attack on the Xyz Dimension is true. Yuya brings out Rune-Eyes Pendulum Dragon and Beast-Eyes Pendulum Dragon. Declan manages to withstand his attack and states that he must become stronger if he wants to save Zuzu.
51	2	"Kings vs. Dragons" / Raise the Banner of Revolution - Odd-Eyes Rebellion Dragon; Transliteration: "Hanki o Agero, Oddo-Aizu Riberion Doragon" (Japanese: 反旗を揚げろ オッドアイズ・リベリオン・ドラゴン)	Shinya Une Animation director: Shinpei Koikawa, Kiyotaka Iida	Tsutomu Kamishiro	Kenji Setou	April 12, 2015	July 29, 2016
Declan is aware that Zuzu had teleported away with Yugo, but he keeps quiet about it as he brings out his Pendulum Fusion Monster, D/D/D Wave Oblivion King Caesar Ragnarok. Yuya fights back with Dark Rebellion Xyz Dragon. Declan responds with his own Pendulum Xyz Monster, D/D/D Dou Dawn King Kali Yuga. Determined to win at all costs, Yuya brings out Odd-Eyes Rebellion Dragon. Unfortunately, Declan uses his monster's special abilities and traps to win the duel.
52	3	"Parental Guidance: Part 1" / The Legendary Grandmaster Revives!! Transliteration: "Yomigaeru Densetsu Sōchō!!" (Japanese: 蘇る伝説総長！！)	Ryūta Yamamoto Animation director: Michio Satou, Kazuyuki Ikai	Tsutomu Kamishiro	Tsukasa Sunaga	April 19, 2015	August 5, 2016
Following the closing of the Battle Royal, Henrietta reveals to the audience the truth about what is happening. She announces the Lancers are heroes that will protect Paradise City and encourages others to join them. After Yuya informs Skip and Yoko about what happened to Zuzu, Yoko notices Yuya's wavering behavior. Yoko challenges Yuya to a duel. Yoko reveals she was once the leader of a woman's dueling gang. When a rival gang took one of her friends hostage, it was Yusho who showed her the importance of Dueltainment. Yoko hopes to teach this lesson to Yuya in her duel.
53	4	"Parental Guidance: Part 2" / "Smile World" - A Duel Filled With Smiles; Transliteration: "Egao no Dyueru "Sumairu Wārudo"" (Japanese: 笑顔のデュエル 「スマイル・ワールド」)	Keiichirou Mochizuki Animation director: Toshi Shishikura	Tsutomu Kamishiro	Tsukasa Sunaga	April 26, 2015	August 12, 2016
Following his mother's advice, Yuya regains his entertainment spirit and wins against Yoko. She gives him the 'Smile World' spell card that bonds her and Yusho. The next day, Declan gathers together the Lancers, which now include Riley. Declan announces they will be going to recruit allies in the Synchro Dimension, where it is revealed Zuzu has been taken to the Synchro Dimension. Given new trans-dimensional Duel Disks, the Lancers set off for the Synchro Dimension.
54	5	"City 'Scape" / The Synchro Dimension "Neo Domino City"; Transliteration: "Shinkuro Jigen "Neo Domino Shiti"" (Japanese: シンクロ次元 「ネオ童実野シティ」)	Masahiro Takada Animation director: Hidekazu Ebina	Tsutomu Kamishiro	Masahiro Takada	May 3, 2015	August 19, 2016
Following their sudden teleportation, Zuzu and Yugo end up in the Synchro Dimension at Yugo's hometown of New Domino City. Yugo tells Zuzu about how Yuri kidnapped his childhood friend, Rin. Clear Wing Synchro Dragon sent him to the Xyz Dimension, where he mistook Yuto for Rin's kidnapper. Zuzu clears up the confusion who explains to Yugo about the various versions of herself and Yuya from different dimensions as well as Duel Academy's ambitions. As the two are soon forced to escape from Security, Yugo explains how 99% of the population known as Commons live in the slums under fear from the privileged 1% known as the Topsiders. Yugo hopes to one day go up against Jack Atlas. Jack Atlas is a duelist from Commons who rose to become a champion. An officer from Sector Security known as a Duel Chaser forces Yugo into a Turbo Duel. A Turbo Duel is a high speed duel taking place on their Duel Runners.
55	6	"Tops Speed" / Public Safety Coercion - The Duel Chasers; Transliteration: "Chian no Kyōsei Dyueru Cheisāzu" (Japanese: 治安の強制 デュエルチェイサーズ)	Lee Kap-min Animation director: Lee Sung-jin	Mitsutaka Hirota	Tetsuaki Matsuda	May 10, 2015	August 26, 2016
As the Turbo Duel begins, the news reporter Melissa Trail reports the Duel Chaser brings out his Synchro Monster Goyo Chaser. Yugo responds with his Hi-Speedroid Chanbara. The Duel Chaser soon brings out his ace monster, Goyo Predator, and takes control of Yugo's monster to deal him heavy damage. Yugo uses his trap to bring out Clear Wing Synchro Dragon and wins the duel. They successfully escape from Security's grasp. As Yuya, Celina, Sylvio, and Riley arrive in New Domino City's slums, they are confronted by Security who mistook Yuya and Celina as Yugo and Zuzu. Celina and Sylvio step in to duel in an Action Duel against them.
56	7	"Synchro Sector" / Security's Perfect Encirclement!! Transliteration: "Sekyuriti Kanzen Hōimō!!" (Japanese: セキュリティ完全包囲網！！)	Fumio Maezono Animation director: Toshihiko Masuda	Yasunori Kasuga	Tsukasa Sunaga	May 17, 2015	September 2, 2016
After Sylvio is defeated in one turn, Yuya decides to use his Dueltainment to fight against his opponent while protecting Riley. As Celina defeats her opponent, they are surrounded by more Security officers. Yuya brings out his Pendulum Summoning to provide an opportunity for Celina to escape with Riley, but she refuses to do so. Yuya, Celina, Sylvio, and Riley are rescued by a group of Turbo Duelists led by Crow Hogan.
57	8	"Super Duelists" / "The Black Whirlwind - Crow Hogan"; Transliteration: "Kuroi Senpū Kurou Hōgan" (Japanese: 黒い旋風 クロウ・ホーガン)	Kimiharu Muto Animation director: Yuya Kawamura	Ryo Tamura	Naoki Kotani	May 24, 2015	September 9, 2016
Crow takes Yuya and the others to his home to let them lie low. Crow informs Yuya, Celina, Sylvio, and Riley about how the Topsiders reign over the Commons. They soon learn that Zuzu and Yugo have been spotted nearby and decide to go in search for them. Meanwhile, Dennis arrived with Gong. Dennis decides to use entertainment to earn some money from the citizens and attract the attention of the media with a duel. Following the duel, Dennis and Gong are approached by a promoter named Lucas Swank, who sees potential in their dueling abilities.
58	9	"Scream for the Green" / Invitation to the Dark Duel; Transliteration: "Yami Dyueru e no Shōtai" (Japanese: 闇デュエルへの招待)	Norihiko Nagahama Animation director: Eri Osada, Kim Bu-Yeong	Tsutomu Kamishiro	Norihiko Nagahama	May 31, 2015	September 16, 2016
Lucas Swank brings Gong and Dennis to an underground Turbo Duel Arena, where Shay is already participating in the search for strong duelists to join the Lancers. As Yuya hears from Crow about how Topsiders and Sector Security used Turbo Duel to subjugate the Commons who invented it, Celina and Sylvio grow tired of waiting and decide to go off in search of Zuzu and Declan. Back at the underground Turbo Duel Arena, Shay needs one more consecutive win to enter the Friendship Cup, where he could potentially fight against Jack Atlas. Shay duels against Dennis in a Turbo Duel. As both duelists bring each other's life points down to 100, Dennis' Pendulum Summon attracts attention from Sector Security.
59	10	"Dueling's Most Wanted" / Underground Riding Duel!! Transliteration: "Chika Raidingu Dyueru!!" (Japanese: 地下ライディング・デュエル！！)	Yasuyuki Fuse Animation director: Choe Byeong-hui, Lee Sung-jin	Mitsutaka Hirota	Tsukasa Sunaga	June 7, 2015	September 23, 2016
Dennis brings out his Xyz Monster Performage Shadow Maker. Shay takes control of it to evolve it into Raidraptor - Revolution Falcon. Dennis manages to summon another Performage Shadow Maker. Before the duel can conclude, Sector Security shuts down the power in the ring and arrests everyone. Back at Crow's hideout, Yuya and Crow get into a petty argument with each other over how best to make Riley smile. They decide to settle it with a duel. Just as the duel gets started, everyone is ambushed by Sector Security and captured. However, Moon Shadow rescues Riley.
60	11	"Showdown in the Slammer" / No Cards, No Pardon; Transliteration: "Jigoku no Sata mo Kādo Shidai" (Japanese: 地獄の沙汰もカード次第)	Keiichirou Mochizuki Animation director: Toshi Shishikura	Mitsutaka Hirota	Shunsuke Machitani	June 14, 2015	September 30, 2016
Yuya and the other captured duelists are taken to a detention facility. Celina is taken elsewhere, while the others are put in a cell. They are reunited with Gong's group and learn about the harshness of prison life. Inmates use duel cards as currency to get preferential treatment. The prison's boss, Chojiro Tokumatsu, starts demanding Yuya and his friends' cards in exchange for giving them a luxury life in the facility. Yuya strongly objects to his demand. The clashing of their beliefs urges Chojiro to challenge Yuya to a duel. Chojiro brings out his Synchro Monster, Flower Cardian Lightshower, which deals damage to Yuya anytime he draws and activates a trap that blocks off Yuya's ability to Pendulum Summon.
61	12	"Hero's Fall" / The Man Who Threw Away Drawing; Transliteration: "Dorō o Suteta Otoko" (Japanese: ドローを捨てた男)	Takanori Yano Animation director: Kazuyuki Ikai, Naoki Aisaka, Satoru Shiraishi	Mitsutaka Hirota	Tsukasa Sunaga	June 21, 2015	October 7, 2016
As Yuya is pushed into a corner by Chojiro's combo, Crow reveals that Chojiro was once a beloved duelist who taught people to enjoy dueling until he was humiliated by Topsiders' duelists and got arrested for cheating. Determined to prove the fun of dueling, Yuya manages to create a combo of his own to protect himself from Flower Cardian Lighshower's effects. Encouraged by Yuya, Chojiro reignites his entertainment spirit and fights in his old way. Yuya responds by winning the duel with his Pendulum Summoning.
62	13	"The Great Escape" / Great Entertainment Duel Tournament!! Transliteration: "Dai Entamedyueru Taikai!!" (Japanese: 大エンタメデュエル大会!!)	Masahiro Takada Animation director: Hidekazu Ebina	Ryo Tamura	Masahiro Takada	June 28, 2015	October 12, 2016 (Note: The English dub of Yu-Gi-Oh! Arc-V episodes 62–99 first premiered in Australia on 9Go!.)
As Chojiro makes plans for the Great Entertainment Duel Tournament, Crow starts acting cold towards Yuya, who hears about Zuzu being targeted by Sector Security. Meanwhile, Yugo decides to enter both himself and Zuzu into the Friendship Cup. Chojiro's tournament kicks off with a three-way Action Duel between himself, Sylvio, and Yuya. Crow and his friends use the distraction to form their own escape plan. When Yuya struggles to get into the spirit of things, Gong cheers him up and gets him into the duel. This inevitably exposes Crow's escape attempt. As an all out jail break takes place, Yuya and the others escape with help from Chojiro's lackeys.
63	14	"Fight for Freedom" / King of Captors - Goyo King; Transliteration: "Hokaku-sha no Ō Goyō Kingu" (Japanese: 捕獲者の王「ゴョ ウ・キング」)	Yoshitaka Koyama Animation director: Toshihiko Masuda	Tsutomu Kamishiro	Naoki Kotani	July 5, 2015	October 13, 2016
Yuya, Sylvio, and Chojiro arrive at the Facility's roof, where they are confronted by the Stomptroopers, who force them into a Battle Royal. As Security summons their ace monster, Goyo King, Gong and Shay arrive on the scene to defeat them. Reuniting with Crow and the others, Yuya and the others fall into a trap laid out by chief of Sector Security, Jean-Michel Roget. Before Roget can take custody of them, powers from higher up request that they be taken to a trial. Declan, Riley, and Moon Shadow explain the situation to Roget and the High Council. Asked to prove that what they are saying is the truth, Declan requests that everyone be entered into the Friendship Cup, which Yuya learns Zuzu will be participating in. Roget agrees on the condition that Yuya face off against Jack Atlas in an exhibition match.
64	15	"Match with the Master" / Duel King - Jack Atlas; Transliteration: "Dyueru Kingu "Jakku Atorasu"" (Japanese: デュエルキング「ジャック·アトラス」)	Kang-Min Lee Animation director: Lee Sung-jin, Choe Byeong-hui	Tsutomu Kamishiro	Tsukasa Sunaga	July 12, 2015	October 14, 2016
At the opening ceremony of the Friendship Cup, Zuzu spectates with Yugo. Zuzu is surprised to see Yuya participating. Yuya soon begins his Action Turbo Duel against Jack, who declares he will win in three turns. Jack brings out his first Synchro Monster, Red Wyvern, while Yuya brings out Rune Eyes Pendulum Dragon and Yuto's Dark Rebellion Xyz Dragon. Jack manages to survive Yuya's attack thanks to an Action Card. Jack brings out his ace monster, Scarlight Red Dragon Archfiend, and uses its power to defeat Yuya.
65	16	"Traits of a Traitor" / The Shattered Entertainment; Transliteration: "Uchikudakareta Entame" (Japanese: 打ち砕かれたエンタメ)	Kimiharu Muto Animation director: Yuya Kawamura	Tsutomu Kamishiro	Kazuya Iwata	July 19, 2015	October 17, 2016
Following Yuya's defeat, Zuzu attempts to come to his aid. Zuzu is stopped when she and Yugo are taken into custody by the High Council's guards, who prevent Roget's Sector Security from capturing them. The next morning, Yuya awakens in a penthouse, where all the participants are locked up. Yuya senses a reaction from Odd Eyes Pendulum Dragon and Yuto's Dark Rebellion Xyz Dragon that Yugo's Clear Wing Synchro Dragon is nearby. As Yuya laments how Jack looked down upon his Dueltainment, he receives a card from one of the attendants, Sam. Sam believes Jack turned his back on the Commons after becoming the Master of Faster and insulted him by likening him to the weak monster card. With the tournament underway, Gong is set to duel against Crow in the opening match.
66	17	"Crow's Crew" / Opening Duel!! Crow vs. Gongenzaka; Transliteration: "Kaimakusen!! Kurou Bāsasu Gongenzaka" (Japanese: 開幕戦！！クロウVS権現坂)	Yukio Takahashi Animation director: Eri Osada, Takashi Ueno	Yoshifumi Fukushima	Yukio Takahashi	July 26, 2015	October 18, 2016
As the duel begins, Crow becomes worried when he spots the children he looks after being chased around the stadium. This prompts Crow to try to end the duel as quickly as he can. Crow brings out his Assault Blackwing - Raikiri the Rain Shower, but Gong withstands his attack using his Heavystrong Style. Gong brings out Superheavy Samurai Beast Kyubi. Spotting the kids in the crowd again, Crow regains his determination and summons his ace monster, Assault Blackwing - Kusanagi the Gathering Storm. Crow wins the duel.
67	18	"Riley's Reveal" / The Light and Shadows of Neo Domino City; Transliteration: "Neo Domino Shiti no Hikari to Kage" (Japanese: ネオ童実野シティの光と影)	Naoki Kotani Animation director: Ikkou Kobayashi, Chûichi Iguchi	Tsutomu Kamishiro	Naoki Kotani	August 2, 2015	October 19, 2016
As Yuya becomes concerned about what happens to Gong following his defeat, Chojiro tells him about a rumor that those who lose in the Friendship Cup are sent to an underground garbage disposal facility to do forced labor cleaning up the garbage the Topsiders produce. Meanwhile, Riley is chosen to duel against Crow's friend, Shinji Weber. Riley becomes afraid and runs off to Yuya. When Declan follows after him, Yuya questions him over why he keeps putting Riley in dangerous situations against his will. Declan claims that he coerced Riley into joining the Lancers as he is necessary to fight against Duel Academy, but Yuya refuses to accept that. When asked directly about why he does not want to duel, Riley answers that he does not want to duel Shinji after he showed him kindness. Seeing this as a sign of Riley's personal growth, Declan arranges for Moon Shadow to duel in his place. As Riley returns to his side, Declan recalls how Henrietta found Riley in a war-torn country. Riley was stripped of his own sense of self as a defense mechanism.
68	19	"Common Cause" / All-Out Rebellion- Bee Force; Transliteration: "Bī Fōsu Issei Hōki" (Japanese: B・F(ビー・フォース)一斉蜂起)	Keiichirou Mochizuki Animation director: Toshi Shishikura	Ryo Tamura	Tsukasa Sunaga	August 9, 2015	October 20, 2016
Moon Shadow and Shinji's duel begins. Moon Shadow uses Action Cards and his ninja monsters to deal a lot of damage, while Shinji fights back with his Bee Force monsters. Meanwhile, Riley fears that Declan is favoring Moon Shadow over him. Riley worries about what would happen should Moon Shadow win. As Moon Shadow further strengthens his defense with ninja monsters, Shinji harbors strong hatred for the Topsiders due to their subjugation of the Commons. Shinji rallies the strength of his fellow Commons and brings out his ace monster, Battle Wasp - Ballista the Armageddon, to win the duel. Declan reveals this is part of his plan.
69	20	"A Concerted Effort" / The Sprinting Divas; Transliteration: "Shissō-suru Dība" (Japanese: 疾走するディーバ)	Yasuyuki Fuse Animation director: Choe Byeong-hui, Lee Sung-jin	Mitsutaka Hirota	Tetsuaki Matsuda	August 16, 2015	October 21, 2016
The next match pits Zuzu up against Chojiro. Yuya does not want to see Zuzu or Chojiro sent to the underground refinery. Chojiro quickly brings out his Flower Cardian Lightshower, but Zuzu manages to fight back with her Action Cards. Wanting to give Yuya her support, Zuzu brings out her own Dueltaining spirit. Zuzu reminds Yuya of all those who support him. Chojiro brings out Flower Cardian Lightflare to negate Zuzu's spells and special abilities. Zuzu manages to bring out Bloom Diva the Melodious Choir and uses her own effects to win the duel, though it also involves Chojiro to work in the refinery.
70	21	"The Gift of Grit" / An Out-Of-Reach Shout; Transliteration: "Todokanu Sakebi" (Japanese: 届かぬ叫び)	Ippei Yokota Animation director: Tomoaki Kado, Eri Kojima	Tsutomu Kamishiro	Tsukasa Sunaga	August 23, 2015	October 24, 2016
The fourth and final match of the day pits Celina against New Domino City resident Tony, who she quickly wins against. As each of the duelists reflect on the day's events, Declan is given an audience with Jack, who expresses an interest in seeing Riley's eyes. Jack further explains about his childhood. He states how his life in the slums changed after receiving a card that was discarded by the Topsiders. This drove him to become stronger. Meanwhile, Duel Chaser Officer 227 receives a card from Roget to use in his duel against Yuya. Duel Chaser Officer 227 is the guard Yugo previously defeated.
71	22	"Duel Consequences" / The Sword of White Silver; Transliteration: "Shirogane no Tsurugi" (Japanese: 白銀の剣)	Naoki Murata Animation director: Kazuyuki Ikai, Satoru Shiraishi	Mitsutaka Hirota	Shōji Nishida	August 30, 2015	October 25, 2016
Before his duel with Duel Chaser Officer 227, Yuya tries to tell the others what happens to the losers. Yuya finds out that no one in the audience cares. As Yuya summons his Odd-Eyes, Officer 227 summons a Fusion Monster he received from Roget, Goyo Emperor, to take control of Yuya's monsters. However, Yuya brings out a new monster, Odd-Eyes Saber Dragon, to recover his monsters and wins the duel. Yuya comes to regret his victory at the cost of sending Officer 227 to the underground.
72	23	"Turbotainers" / Slaying the Dragon!! Yugo vs Sawatari; Transliteration: "Doragon Seibatsu!! Yūgo Bāsasu Sawatari" (Japanese: ドラゴン征伐！！ ユーゴvs沢渡)	Ryūta Yamamoto Animation director: Hidekazu Ebina	Yoshifumi Fukushima	Tsukasa Sunaga	September 6, 2015	October 26, 2016
The next match pits Yugo against Sylvio. As Yugo brings out Clear Wing Synchro Dragon, Yuya senses a reaction from Odd-Eyes Pendulum Dragon. Yuya finds himself mentally connected to Yugo through their respective dragons. Sylvio brings out the power of his monsters to push Yugo into a corner. Yugo manages to win the duel even though he was strengthened by his unknown connection to Yuya.
73	24	"Turning Point" / The Crawling Losers; Transliteration: "Chi o Hau Haibokusha-tachi" (Japanese: 地を這う敗北者たち)	Yoshitaka Koyama Animation director: Toshihiko Masuda	Tsutomu Kamishiro	Ryūta Yamamoto	September 13, 2015	October 27, 2016
Having lost his duel against Yugo, Sylvio is taken to New Domino City's underground garbage disposal facility, where Lucas Swank appears to be running things. Lucas explains to Gong and Chojiro how he supplied Roget with Sergey, who is a powerful duelist in the Friendship Cup. Sergey is said to have died once. This further reveals that Jean-Michel Roget is rumored to come from another dimension. After Moon Shadow relays this to Declan, who deduces that Roget is from the Fusion Dimension, Riley apologizes for his selfish wishes. Riley states his determination to fight for Yuya. After Sergey lays waste to Damon in the seventh match, Moon Shadow relays Riley's words to Yuya. This encourages Yuya to keep winning in order to face Jack once more. Yuya in turn has Moon Shadow deliver a message to Zuzu. Yuya assures Zuzu that he will win and bring her home safely. Note: This episode is the 777th in Nihon Ad Systems' Yu-Gi-Oh! anime franchise (and does not include Toei Animation's 1998 adaptation).
74	25	"A Traitor Unmasked" / Mask Of The Clown; Transliteration: "Dōkeshi no Kamen" (Japanese: 道化師の仮面)	Kang-Min Lee Animation director: Lee Sung-jin, Lee Seok-yoon	Ryo Tamura	Tsukasa Sunaga	September 20, 2015	October 28, 2016
The final match of the first round pits Shay against Dennis. Shay is determined to learn of Dennis' true intentions. Dennis summons out his Trapeze Magician and three Shadow Makers, while Shay brings out his Revolution Falcon. After Shay eventually manages to destroy Trapeze Magician, he exposes Dennis as a member of Duel Academy. Dennis summons his Fusion monster, Chaos Ancient Gear Giant, which is a behemoth 4500 attack point monster that brings up Shay's bad memories from the destruction of Heartland City.
75	26	"Shay's Revenge" / Curse of the Resistors; Transliteration: "Hangyakusha no Jubaku" (Japanese: 反逆者の呪縛)	Kimiharu Muto Animation director: Yuya Kawamura	Ryo Tamura	Tsukasa Sunaga	September 27, 2015	October 31, 2016
As Shay barely withstands Chaos Ancient Gear Giant's attacks, Dennis reveals how he helped Yuri capture Lulu. Angered by Dennis' treachery, Shay summons Raidraptor - Satellite Cannon Falcon. Shay uses its special ability to weaken Chaos Ancient Gear Giant before unleashing Vengeful Vengeance to defeat Dennis and win the duel. As the High Council prevents Declan from leaving their sight, Yuya comes to understand Yuto's rage. Yuya takes on Yuto's feelings and resolves to put a stop to the interdimensional war.
76	27	"Plans of Attack" / King's Gambit; Transliteration: "Kinguzu Gyanbitto" (Japanese: キングズ・ギャンビット)	Naoki Kotani Animation director: Chûichi Iguchi	Tsutomu Kamishiro	Naoki Kotani	October 4, 2015	November 1, 2016
Yuya, Roget, and the High Council all recount from their perspective the events that occurred following the Lancers' arrival in New Domino City. Meanwhile, as Dennis evades capture, Roget activates his plan, Operation: King's Gambit. Roget uses microchips to take control of all the Sector Security officers and hold the High Council along with Declan captive. Roget announces his plans to make New Domino City his own personal kingdom. Elsewhere, Dennis is recovered by Sora. Sora sends Dennis back to the Fusion Dimension and takes over his mission. At Duel Academy, Leo prepares to send Barrett, Yuri, and the Obelisk Force to recover Zuzu and Celina. Unaware of any of this, Yuya and Zuzu prepare for the second round of the Friendship Cup, where Zuzu is set to face off against Sergey Volkov.
77	28	"A Cons Game" / The Beauty of Destruction; Transliteration: "Hakai no Bigaku" (Japanese: 破壊の美学)	Keiichirou Mochizuki Animation director: Toshi Shishikura	Mitsutaka Hirota	Masahiro Takada	October 11, 2015	November 2, 2016
Zuzu begins her match against Sergey, which takes place on the duel lanes of New Domino City due to the stadium being destroyed due to Shay and Dennis' match. As Sergey utilizes a strange masochistic play style, Zuzu Fusion Summons Bloom Prima the Melodious Choir. Zuzu brings Sergey's life points down to 200. However, just as Zuzu tries to tell the citizens about the interdimensional war, Sergey shows his sadistic true nature and Fusion summons Thorn Over Server - Van Darli Zuma. Sergey uses its special abilities and his Duel Runner to defeat Zuzu. Sergey ruthlessly knocks Zuzu into a building, much to Yuya's horror.
78	29	"Rebel Road" / Storm of Revolution; Transliteration: "Kakumei no Arashi" (Japanese: 革命の嵐)	Ippei Yokota Animation director: Tomoaki Kado, Eri Kojima, Kazuki Baba	Yoshifumi Fukushima	Shōji Nishida	October 18, 2015	November 3, 2016
The next match pits Yuya up against Shinji. Yuya feels no comfort upon hearing that no one will come to the aid of Zuzu due to the way New Domino City treats the losers. As the match begins, Shinji shows his determination to prove the strength of the Commons. Yuya seems more focused on ending the duel as quickly as he can to save Zuzu. Just as Yuya is cornered by Shinji's Synchro Monster, Battle Wasp - Azusa the Ghost Bow, Sora appears before him and shows Zuzu's helmet that indicates that she is fine and encourages him to duel seriously.
79	30	"Road to Rebellion" / The Enlightened Paladin; Transliteration: "Kakusei-suru Madō Kenshi" (Japanese: 覚醒する魔導剣士)	Yasuyuki Fuse Animation director: Lee Sung-jin, Lee Seok-yun	Yoshifumi Fukushima	Naoki Kotani	October 25, 2015	November 4, 2016
Further stirring up the anger of the Commons, Shinji brings out his ace monster, Battle Wasp - Hama the Conquering Bow. Yuya draws the card he received from Sam, which is Tuning Magician. Yuya decided to put Tuning Magician in his deck to prove there is no such a thing as a useless card. Tuning Magician seemingly puts him at a disadvantage with its effect of hurting Yuya and healing Shinji. However, Yuya manages to use Tuning Magician to Synchro summon Enlightenment Paladin. Yuya uses its special abilities and the efforts of Tuning Magician to defeat Shinji.
80	31	"Where the Truth Lies" / Reunion that Transcends Dimensions; Transliteration: "Jigen o Koeta Saikai" (Japanese: 次元を越えた再会)	Jìng xuě yuèyè Animation director: Teruhiko Yamazaki, Hwang Youngsik	Tsutomu Kamishiro	Masahiro Takada	November 1, 2015	November 7, 2016
Following his duel, Yuya is already facing criticism from the Commons. Yuya is met with more hatred when Roget implies he is in cahoots with the Topsiders. Heading into New Domino City, Yuya reunites with Sora, who assures him that Zuzu is in a safe place. Following his duel with Yuya, Sora explains how he went to the Synchro Dimension to retrieve Celina in order to protect Zuzu. Sora still sees Zuzu as a friend. As Yuya remains defiant about relinquishing Celina, he believes it will do nothing to stop Leo's ambitions. Yuya is captured by Sector Security. Yuya urges Sora to escape and keep Zuzu safe. Zuzu wakes up in the care of Crow's children, Frank, Amanda, and Tarren, who bring her along with them to watch Crow's duel against Shay.
81	32	"Battle Birds" / Our Respective Battlefields; Transliteration: "Sorezore no Senjō" (Japanese: それぞれの戦場)	Ryūta Yamamoto Animation director: Hidekazu Ebina	Ryo Tamura	Ryūta Yamamoto	November 8, 2015	November 8, 2016
Crow and Shay are filled with their own determinations as they begin their duel. Shay quickly brings out Raidraptor - Rise Falcon, and Crow summons Assault Blackwing - Raikiri the Rain Shower. Meanwhile, Yuya is brought before Roget, who tries to sway Yuya to join his cause and convince him that Sora will just betray him. While Sora tries to evade Sector Security, Zuzu was found by Frank, Amanda, and Tarren. They take Zuzu to watch the duel between Shay and Crow. Shay brings out Raidraptor - Blaze Falcon to destroy Crow's monster.
82	33	"Warriors of the Air" / The Ultimate Falcon VS The Black-Feathered Thunder; Transliteration: "Kyūkyoku no Hayabusa Bāsasu Kurohane no Ikazuchi" (Japanese: 究極の隼VS黒羽の雷)	Yoshitaka Koyama Animation director: Toshihiko Masuda	Ryo Tamura	Shōji Nishida	November 15, 2015	November 9, 2016
As Crow and Shay's duel escalates, Shay suddenly seems to want Crow to put a stop to the duel. However, Crow refuses to listen until Shay reveals that one of Crow's kids, Tarren, had fallen on top of Crow's monster. Shay manages to rescue Tanner as he falls off and returns him safely to the other kids. Finding common ground in their desire to help others, Shay and Crow become friends and decide to give their duel everything they have. Crow brings out his ultimate monster, Assault Blackwing - Onimaru the Divine Thunder to destroy Shay's Raid Raptor - Ultimate Falcon and wins the duel. Meanwhile, Roget send Sector Security to capture Zuzu and locks up Yuya, who decides to keep believing in his friends.
83	34	"A Matter of Trust" / The Bond Between Teacher and Disciple; Transliteration: "Shitei no Kizuna" (Japanese: 師弟の絆)	Junichi Takahashi Animation director: Satoru Shiraishi, Kazuyuki Ikai	Tsutomu Kamishiro	Naoki Kotani	November 22, 2015	November 10, 2016
Zuzu and the kids are surrounded by Sector Security when Sora arrives on the scene. Sora helps Zuzu defeat them and escape. Hearing about Yuya's capture, Zuzu becomes determined to rescue him. Sora tells Zuzu that it is too risky since she is being targeted by both Sector Security and Duel Academy. Moon Shadow appears to take revenge on Sora for what happened to his brother, Sun Shadow, but Zuzu convinces Moon Shadow and Sora not to fight each other. Zuzu reminds Sora of his promise to Yuya to protect her. Following her request, Sora asks Moon Shadow to take Zuzu and the kids to safety. Sora thinks of a way to rescue Yuya. As Roget prepares to use his cerebral restrictors on Yuya and Sergey, the duel between Yugo and Celina commences.
84	35	"A Plan and a Promise: Part 1" / Dice Roll of Destiny; Transliteration: "Unmei no Daisurōru" (Japanese: 運命のダイスロール)	Kang-Min Lee Animation director: Lee Sung-jin, Lee Seok-yoon	Mitsutaka Hirota	Masahiro Takada	November 29, 2015	November 11, 2016
Yugo faces off against Celina. Celina is met with unwanted affection from Yugo due to her resemblance to Rin. Celina is irritated by Yugo's buffoonery. Celina pulls ahead with her Lunalight Cat Dancer's double attacking strategy. Yugo eventually snaps out of his daze and starts playing seriously. Roget wants Celina to win for his own ambitions. Roget starts manipulating the course in her favor. Roget almost causes Yugo to crash. Celina brings out Lunalight Panther Dancer. Roget further alters the course to prevent Yugo from obtaining an Action Card. Yugo remembers Rin's words and performs a risky dice roll trap card to Synchro Summon Clear Wing Synchro Dragon. Yuya links his mind with Yugo again.
85	36	"A Plan and a Promise: Part 2" / Crystal Wings; Transliteration: "Suishō no Tsubasa" (Japanese: 水晶の翼)	Keiichirou Mochizuki Animation director: Toshi Shishikura	Mitsutaka Hirota	Tsukasa Sunaga	December 13, 2015	November 14, 2016
Yugo's mind is once again linked with Yuya. Yugo manages to bring out the power of his Clear Wing Synchro Dragon. Celina ignores a chance to grab an Action Card offered by Roget's course change. Celina chooses to duel her own way. Feeling excitement from the audience, Celina summons her ultimate Fusion monster, Lunalight Leo Dancer, whose high attack power and special ability nearly wipes out Yugo's life points. Yugo and Yuya respond by Synchro Summoning a new monster, Crystal Wing Synchro Dragon. Yugo wins the duel. After Celina gives her thanks for showing her the fun of dueling, Yugo notices Yuri watching from above the stadium.
86	37	"Against All Odds" / Unyielding Resolve; Transliteration: "Hirumanu Ketsui" (Japanese: 怯まぬ決意)	Masahiro Takada Animation director: Yuya Kawamura	Tsutomu Kamishiro	Katsumi Ono	December 20, 2015	November 15, 2016
While Yugo attempts to pursue Yuri, Roget sends Sector Security to capture Celina before she can reach the underground. However, Riley appears on the scene to face the officers in a duel. Riley was given the chance to escape by Declan. Using his Triple C monsters and the gritty confidence passed down to him by Jack, Riley defeats each of the Sector Security officers. Declan manages to defeat all of the officers guarding the High Council. Angered by their defiance, Roget sends Sergey, who is now back under his control to attack the High Council. Roget pushes forward the semifinal match between Yuya and Crow to distract the public.
87	38	"The Many Dimensions Of Yuya" / The Memories of the Beast; Transliteration: "Yajū no Kioku" (Japanese: 野獣の記憶)	Ippei Yokota Animation director: Tomoaki Kado, Eri Kojima, Kazuki Baba	Tsutomu Kamishiro	Shōji Nishida	December 27, 2015	November 16, 2016
Crow no longer feels animosity towards Yuya following his duel with Shay. Yuya informs Crow about Roget's ambitions. They stage a plan for Yuya to rescue his captured comrades. Crow creates an opportunity for Yuya to reach the High Council building. Unfortunately, Roget activates the cerebral restrictors implanted in Yuya's helmet to send electrical shocks to Yuya's brain. With Yuya's mind linked with Yugo, Yuto, and Yuri, he suddenly becomes hostile against Crow. Yuya Pendulum Summons Odd-Eyes Pendulum Dragon and Xyz Summons Yuto's Dark Rebellion Xyz Dragon.
88	39	"Wake Up Call" / One Strike of Lightning! Transliteration: "Raimei no Ichigeki!" (Japanese: 雷鳴の一撃!)	Yoshihide Yuuzumi Animation director: Mizuki Satou, Teruhiko Yamazaki, Hwang Young-Sik	Tsutomu Kamishiro	Naoki Kotani	January 10, 2016	November 17, 2016
Yuya continues to be controlled by Roget's influence. Yuya brings out Odd-Eyes Rebellion Dragon, which causes a thunderstorm that sends the cerebral restrictors implanted in Yuya's helmet out of control and may endanger his life. As Crow barely manages to survive Yuya's attack, Obelisk Force arrives in New Domino City. This prompts Roget to push forward his attack on the High Council. Noticing the incoming forces, Sora gives a message to Crow, who brings out Assault Blackwing - Chidori the Rain Sprinkling to destroy Odd-Eyes Rebellion Dragon and short out the cerebral restrictors implanted in Yuya's helmet. Yuya returns to his senses even though Crow loses the duel in the process. Before Crow is dragged away, he relays Sora's message about Obelisk Force to Yuya. Yuya sets off to search for Sora and Celina.
89	40	"Hunted And Hounded" / Invasion! Obelisk Force; Transliteration: "Kyōshū! Oberisuku Fōsu" (Japanese: 強襲！オベリスクフォース)	Ryūta Yamamoto Animation director: Hidekazu Ebina, Kenichi Hara	Mitsutaka Hirota	Ryūta Yamamoto	January 17, 2016	November 18, 2016
Obelisk Force search New Domino City for Zuzu and Celina. Yugo confronts Yuri, but he loses track of him again after he failed to answer Zuzu's location to him. With Obelisk Force closing in, Riley stays behind to protect Celina, while Moon Shadow heads toward the underground to warn the others. Moon Shadow encounters some Obelisk Force soldiers along the way. Just as Moon Shadow is driven into a corner, Sora steps in to help him win the duel. Just as Riley starts to become overwhelmed by the seemingly unending Obelisk Force soldiers coming towards him and Celina, Yuya arrives on the scene.
90	41	"Down With the Underground" / The Beacon of Revolution; Transliteration: "Kakumei no Noroshi" (Japanese: 革命の狼煙)	Yasuyuki Fuse Animation director: Lee Sung-jin, Lee Seok-yun	Ryo Tamura	Masahiro Takada	January 24, 2016	November 21, 2016
As Yuya helps Riley fight off Obelisk Force, he is confronted by Barrett. Meanwhile, Moon Shadow helps break the underground duelists free. This inspires Shinji to ignite a jail break. While Shay, Moon Shadow, and Sylvio head towards the exit, Zuzu tries to make her own way to the surface to help Yuya, who is struggling against Barrett.
91	42	"Chain Game" / Converging Fates; Transliteration: "Meguriau Unmei" (Japanese: めぐりあう運命)	Yoshitaka Koyama Animation director: Toshihiko Masuda	Tsutomu Kamishiro	Yasuyuki Fuse	January 31, 2016	November 22, 2016
While Yuya is driven further into a corner by Barrett's seemingly unstoppable double Trap combination, Riley is hampered by memories of his traumatic past. Just as Sora arrives to help Yuya and Riley, both Yuri and Yugo arrive as well. Yuri and Yugo end up dueling each other. As the Lancers and escapees go on their respective missions, Zuzu follows her glowing bracelet in order to find Yuya. When Yugo and Yuri summon their respective dragons, Clear Wing Synchro Dragon and Starving Venom Fusion Dragon, they resonate with Yuya's Odd Eyes Pendulum Dragon and Yuto's Dark Rebellion Xyz Dragon that causes abnormalities to the four of them.
92	43	"Tragic Reunion"; Transliteration: "Hiun no Saikai" (Japanese: 悲運の再会)	Junichi Takahashi Animation director: Satoru Shiraishi, Kazuyuki Ikai	Tsutomu Kamishiro	Tsukasa Sunaga	February 7, 2016	November 23, 2016
A strange occurrence rises up within Yuya as he synchronizes with Yuto, Yugo, and Yuri until Zuzu arrives on the scene. This causes Yugo and Yuri to be transported by her bracelet. Determined to protect both Zuzu and Celina, Yuya returns to his senses and continues his duel against Barrett. They got interrupted when Sergey arrives to capture Zuzu and uses his new Earthbound Prisoner monsters to defeat Barrett. Barrett uses the last of his strength to send Celina and himself to Duel Academy. Despite Yuya's efforts, Sergey defeats him and captures Zuzu.
93	44	"Road Rage: Part 1" / The Destructive Duel Machine; Transliteration: "Hametsu no Dyueru Mashin" (Japanese: 破滅のデュエルマシン)	Keiichirou Mochizuki Animation director: Toshi Shishikura	Mitsutaka Hirota	Shōji Nishida	February 14, 2016	November 24, 2016
Shinji leads the Commons in a revolt against the Topsiders. Yuya informs the others about Roget's plans. Sora and Moon Shadow set off to rescue Zuzu. With Yugo missing, Roget arranges for Jack Atlas to face off against Sergey in the second semifinal match of the Friendship Cup. Roget hopes to send New Domino City into despair by having Sergey defeat Jack. Prior to the match, Jack tells Sam the true meaning of why he gave him Tuning Magician. Jack says every card and person has its own worth. The duel between Sergey and Jack begins. Jack brings out Scarlight Red Dragon Archfiend. Sergey brings out his Earthbound Prisoners. As Sergey activates a Field Spell that allows him to deal damage by collecting Action Cards, both he and his Duel Runner undergo a massive transformation to gain the advantage.
94	45	"Road Rage: Part 2" / The Right Arm that Carved Souls; Transliteration: "Tamashii o Kizanda Migiude" (Japanese: 魂を刻んだ右腕)	Kimiharu Muto Animation director: Yuya Kawamura	Mitsutaka Hirota	Katsumi Ono	February 21, 2016	November 25, 2016
Sergey continues to collect Action Cards to deal damage to Jack. Sergey summons more Earthbound Prisoner monsters and pushes Jack to decide whether or not to destroy Scarlight Red Dragon Archfiend. However, Jack stands firm behind his dragon and manages to overtake Sergey who experiences an error. Sergey begins to ignore the Action Cards in favor of a head on duel. As Sergey breaks free from Roget's control, Jack saves him from falling off the track. Jack defeats Sergey and wins the duel. Sergey is satisfied with his duel and allows himself to fall off the track.
95	46	"Martial Law" / The Duel You Believe In; Transliteration: "Onore no Shinjiru Dyueru" (Japanese: 己の信じるデュエル)	Kang-Min Lee Animation director: Lee Sung-jin, Lee Seok-yoon	Tsutomu Kamishiro	Naoki Kotani	February 28, 2016	November 28, 2016
With his plan in shambles, Roget declares martial law and sets all the Sector Security officers under his control to take down the rioting Commons. However, Zuzu interrupts Roget's public broadcast to inform everyone in New Domino City about both Roget's ambitions and Duel Academy's impending attack. Meanwhile, Sam relays Jack's message to Yuya, which says Yuya should duel in the way he truly believes in. As Crow tries to reason with Shinji to stop rioting, Declan and the other Lancers manage to break past Sector Security. All the Lancers help Yuya reach the Duel Palace, where Yuya plans to face Jack in a duel of smiles and entertainment.
96	47	"The Imitation" / Borrowed Words; Transliteration: "Karimono no Kotoba" (Japanese: 借り物の言葉)	Ippei Yokota Animation director: Tomoaki Kado, Kazuki Baba	Tsutomu Kamishiro	Masahiro Takada	March 13, 2016	November 29, 2016
Roget sends all the Sector Security officers to try to stop the duel between Yuya and Jack, but they are all taken out by the Lancers. As Sora and Moon Shadow sneak into Sector Security HQ to rescue Zuzu, Yuya and Jack begin their duel. Yuya brings Smile World into play. Yuya is stopped by Jack, who brings out Scarlight Red Dragon Archfiend. Jack tells Yuya to duel his own way instead of using what he inherited from his father. Yuya and Jack are ambushed by Duel Chasers, but Jack stops them in one fell swoop with Ruthless Inferno.
97	48	"Making it Mine" / The Sublime Super Paladin; Transliteration: "Kedakaki Chō Madō Kenshi" (Japanese: 気高き超魔導剣士)	Yoshihide Yuuzumi Animation director: Teruhiko Yamazaki, Mizuki Satou	Tsutomu Kamishiro	Ryūta Yamamoto	March 20, 2016	November 30, 2016
Yuya manages to survive Jack's attack and brings out Enlightenment Paladin. Sora and Moon Shadow infiltrate Sector Security HQ and destroy the control system. They free the Duel Chasers from Roget's control. Remembering that he alone was the one who founded Pendulum Summoning, Yuya is able to perform a Synchro Summon without a Tuner monster and summon the Synchro-Pendulum Monster, Nirvana High Paladin. Jack responds by using two Tuner monsters to Double Tune Scarlight Red Dragon Archfiend and summon Tyrant Red Dragon Archfiend. Yuya realizes his way of dueling came from everyone he has faced off against and brings out his army of Performapals along with Timebreaker Magician, which is led by Odd-Eyes Pendulum Dragon.
98	49	"Friendship Finale" / Towards the Only Path; Transliteration: "Hitotsu no Michi e" (Japanese: ひとつの道へ)	Naoki Kotani Animation director: Hidekazu Ebina, Kenichi Hara	Tsutomu Kamishiro	Katsumi Ono	March 27, 2016	December 1, 2016
With all of New Domino City uniting together in support of the duel, Yuya uses the Pendulum Ability of Nirvana High Paladin and the combined strength of all of his monsters to defeat Jack. Yuya earns the title of King of Dueltaining. Afterwards, the High Council apologizes for their previous policies and vows to unite the Topsiders and Commons in harmony. Roget attempts to escape with Zuzu to Duel Academy, but he is stopped in his tracks by Declan, who challenges Roget to a duel.
99	50	"A Vicious Cycle" / The Eternal Duel; Transliteration: "Eien no Dyueru" (Japanese: 永遠のデュエル)	Yoshitaka Koyama Animation director: Wakana Yamashina, Maiko Abe	Tsutomu Kamishiro	Masahiro Takada	April 3, 2016 (Note: Episodes 99 and 100 aired together as a 1-hour television special.)	December 2, 2016
Declan defeats Roget in the duel. Another Roget takes his place thanks to the Intrusion rule. This traps Declan in a seemingly endless duel. However, Declan puts together his own combo that traps Roget in his own eternal loop that defeats his doubles the moment they enter the duel. After failing to turn the other Lancers against Declan, Roget tries to escape with Zuzu, but he is stopped by Jack and Crow. Before Yuya and Zuzu can celebrate their reunion, Roget sets off a machine that accidentally sucks him into a wormhole. When all seems fine, a second wormhole sucks in Zuzu, Yuya, Gong, Sylvio, and Shay. When they woke up again, Yuya, Gong, Sylvio, and Shay found themselves in the ruined Heartland City of the Xyz Dimension.
