= Band-Maiko (album) =

2019 EP by Band-Maiko

- Band-Maiko album cover of regular edition

EP by Band-Maid (as Band-Maiko)
- Released: April 3, 2019
- Recorded: 2018–2019
- Length: 27:29
- Language: Japanese
- Label: Revolver
- Producers: Band-Maid; Masayoshi Yamamoto

Band-Maid (as Band-Maiko) chronology
World Domination (2018)	Band-Maiko (2019)	Conqueror (2019)

Music videos
- "Secret Maiko Lips" on YouTube
- "Gion-cho" on YouTube

Band-Maiko is the first extended play by Japanese rock group Band-Maid (as Band-Maiko). It was released on April 3, 2019, by Revolver Records. In the EP, their maiko costumes and the music with Kyoto dialect lyrics and wagakki became a very popular topic of discussion. It debuted at number 15 on the Oricon Albums Chart, selling 4,440 copies in its first week.

== Background and release ==
"Secret Maiko Lips" was previously released on April Fools' Day 2018. It was meant to be a one off release, but after the positive reception they decided to release an extended play. The limited edition features the music video and making of video for "Gion-cho".

== Composition ==
"Secret Maiko Lips" was originally released as "Secret My Lips" on their album Just Bring It. "Tora and Tora" was originally released as "One and Only" on their album World Domination. The title was taken from the maiko game "Tora-Tora", a type of rock paper scissors game, as well as having part of the lyrics refer to it.

"Yolosiosu" was originally released as "YOLO" on their album Just Bring It. It features the voices of children. "Ansan" was originally released as "Anemone" on their album World Domination. The intro has a quote taken from the Man'yōshū. The male vocals were contributed by their manager.

"Akasimahen" was originally released as "Awkward" on their album Just Bring It. The original version of "Screaming" was released on their single "Start Over". "Gion-cho" is the album's sole original composition. Lead guitarist Kanami Tōno intended to submit a demo for the song at the end of 2018, but it was not until January that she submitted it.

== Accolades ==
Unijolt listed it as the fifth best single/EP of 2019.

== Track listing ==
All lyrics written by Hatoko (Miku Kobato), all music written and arranged by Band-Maid.

No.	Title	Length
1.	"Secret Maiko Lips"	4:24
2.	"Tora and Tora (虎and虎)"	3:26
3.	"Yolosiosu"	4:21
4.	"Ansan"	4:28
5.	"Akasimahen"	3:19
6.	"Screaming (すくりーみんぐ)"	3:54
7.	"Gion-cho (祇園町)"	3:35
Total length:		27:29

=== DVD (Limited Edition) ===
No.	Title	Length
1.	"Gion-cho (祇園町) Video"
2.	"Gion-cho (祇園町) Making of the video"

== Personnel ==
- Fujiki (Saiki Atsumi) – lead vocals
- Hatoko (Miku Kobato) – rhythm guitar, vocals
- Kanoemi (Kanami Tōno) – lead guitar
- Umemisa (Misa) – bass
- Akatsuki (Akane Hirose) – drums

== Charts ==
Chart (2019)	Peak position
Japan Top Albums (Billboard)	11
Japanese Albums (Oricon)	15
