= List of Yu-Gi-Oh! VRAINS episodes =

Yu-Gi-Oh! VRAINS is the fifth spin-off anime series in the Yu-Gi-Oh! franchise and the sixth anime series overall. It is produced by Gallop and broadcast by TV Tokyo. The series is directed by Masahiro Hosoda. The series follows Yusaku Fujiki. It takes place in a high school environment in Den City. The series features Charisma Duelists who use VR and are similar to real life celebrities. The show's theme is "Let's take one step forward and try it!"

The series uses 8 pieces of theme music, including three opening themes and five ending themes. From episodes 1–46, the first opening theme is "With The Wind" (With(ウィズ) The(ザ) Wind(ウィンド), Wizu Za Windo) by Hiroaki "Tommy" Tominaga. From episodes 47–102, the second opening theme is "Go Forward" by Kimeru (go(ゴー) forward(フォーワード), Gō Fōwādo). From episodes 103–120, the third opening theme is "Calling" (コーリング, Kōringu) by Kimeru. From episodes 1–24, the first ending theme is "Believe In Magic" (Believe(ビリーブ) In(イン) Magic(マジック), Birību In Majikku) by Royga. From episodes 25–46, the second ending theme is "Writing Life" by Goodbye Holiday. From episodes 47–70, the third ending theme is "BOY" by uchuu. From episodes 71–95, the fourth ending theme is "Glory" (グローリー, Gurōrī) by Band-Maid. From episodes 96–119, the fifth ending theme is "Are You Ready?" (Are(アー) you(ユー) ready(レディ)？, Ā Yū Redi?) by Bis.

In Canada, the English dub of the series began airing on Teletoon on September 1, 2018. It later began airing in Australia on 9Go! on April 6, 2019. In the United States, the dubbed episodes started streaming on Pluto TV on a channel dedicated to the Yu-Gi-Oh! franchise. Like previous dubs, the English adaptation incorporates its own theme music.

== Series overview ==
Season	Episodes	Originally released	
Season	Episodes	First released	Last released
1	46	May 10, 2017	April 4, 2018
2	57	April 11, 2018	May 15, 2019
3	17	May 22, 2019	September 25, 2019

== Episode list ==
=== Season 1 (2017–18) ===
No.	English dub title / Japanese translated title	Written by	Original release date	English air date	American air date
1	"Link into the VRAINS" / My Name Is Playmaker; Transliteration: "Ore no Na wa Pureimēkā" (Japanese: 俺の名はPlaymaker)	Shin Yoshida	May 10, 2017	March 11, 2018 (U.S. theatres); September 1, 2018 (television)	November 7, 2020
2	"Seize The Wind!" / Seize the Wind! Storm Access; Transliteration: "Kaze o Tsukame! Sutōmu Akusesu" (Japanese: 風を掴め！Storm Access)	Shin Yoshida	May 17, 2017	September 2, 2018	November 14, 2020
3	"Contact" / First Contact; Transliteration: "Fāsuto Kontakuto" (Japanese: ファースト・コンタクト)	Shin Yoshida	May 24, 2017	September 8, 2018	November 21, 2020
4	"Pain and Gain" / Charisma Duelist Go Onizuka; Transliteration: "Karisuma Dyuerisuto: Gō Onizuka" (Japanese: カリスマデュエリスト Go鬼塚)	Junki Takegami	May 31, 2017	September 9, 2018	November 28, 2020
5	"Down for the Count" / The Three Count Rings; Transliteration: "Meidō no Surī Kaunto" (Japanese: 鳴動のスリーカウント)	Junki Takegami	June 7, 2017	September 15, 2018	December 5, 2020
6	"True Blue" / Idol!! Blue Angel; Transliteration: "Aidoru!! Burū Enjeru" (Japanese: アイドル！！ブルーエンジェル)	Atsushi Maekawa	June 14, 2017	September 16, 2018	December 12, 2020
7	"Fallen Angel" / Hanoi's Angel; Transliteration: "Hanoi no Tenshi" (Japanese: ハノイの天使)	Atsushi Maekawa	June 21, 2017	September 22, 2018	December 12, 2020
8	"A Storm is Coming" / Controller of the Wind; Transliteration: "Kaze o Ayatsurishi Mono" (Japanese: 風を操りし者)	Shin Yoshida	July 5, 2017	September 23, 2018	December 19, 2020
9	"Malicious Mayhem" / Enemy I was Seeking; Transliteration: "Oimotometekita Teki" (Japanese: 追い求めてきた敵)	Shin Yoshida	July 12, 2017	September 29, 2018	December 19, 2020
10	"Eye of the Storm" / Impact! Cyberse Vanishes; Transliteration: "Shōgeki! Saibāsu Shōshitsu" (Japanese: 衝撃！サイバース消失)	Shin Yoshida	July 19, 2017	September 30, 2018	January 16, 2021
11	"Neutralized" / Roar of the Magazine Borreload; Transliteration: "Todoroku Dansō Varerurōdo" (Japanese: 轟く弾倉 ヴァレルロード)	Shin Yoshida	July 26, 2017	October 6, 2018	January 16, 2021
12	"Link the Circuit" / Impregnable Defending Dragon Firewall; Transliteration: "Teppeki no Shugoryū Faiawōru" (Japanese: 鉄壁の守護竜ファイアウォール)	Shin Yoshida	August 2, 2017	October 7, 2018	January 16, 2021
13	"Playback" / Battle Record; Transliteration: "Gekitō no Kiroku" (Japanese: 激闘の記録)	Shin Yoshida	August 9, 2017	October 13, 2018	N/A
14	"An Invitation" / Ghost Girl's Invitation; Transliteration: "Gōsuto Gāru no Sasoi" (Japanese: ゴーストガールの誘い)	Junki Takegami	August 16, 2017	October 14, 2018	January 23, 2021
15	"Camouflaged Chaos" / Altergeist that Hides in the Darkness; Transliteration: "Yami ni Shinobu Orutāgaisuto" (Japanese: 闇に忍ぶオルターガイスト)	Junki Takegami	August 23, 2017	October 20, 2018	January 23, 2020
16	"Hack Attack" / Infiltrate SOL's Cyber Fortress; Transliteration: "Sen'nyū Soru Den'nō Yōsai" (Japanese: 潜入SOL電脳要塞)	Atsushi Maekawa	August 30, 2017	October 21, 2018	January 30, 2021
17	"Blue's Back!" / Flawless A.I. Duelist; Transliteration: "Kanzen Muketsu no Ēai Dyuerisuto" (Japanese: 完全無欠のAIデュエリスト)	Atsushi Maekawa	September 6, 2017	October 27, 2018	January 30, 2021
18	"Dueling for Answers" / Wound Into His Heart; Transliteration: "Mune ni Kizumareta Kizu" (Japanese: 胸に刻まれた傷)	Shin Yoshida	September 13, 2017	October 28, 2018	February 6, 2021
19	"The Lost Incident" / Incident Buried in Darkness; Transliteration: "Yami ni Hōmurareshi Jiken" (Japanese: 闇に葬られし事件)	Shin Yoshida	September 20, 2017	November 3, 2018	February 6, 2021
20	"A Piece of the Puzzle" / Unyielding Justice; Transliteration: "Yuzurenai Seigi" (Japanese: ゆずれない正義)	Shin Yoshida	September 27, 2017	November 4, 2018	February 13, 2021
21	"Story Time" / Embers of a New Battle; Transliteration: "Aratana Tatakai no Hidane" (Japanese: 新たな闘いの火種)	Shin Yoshida	October 4, 2017	November 10, 2018	N/A
22	"The Deleted" / Blackened Sun; Transliteration: "Shikkoku ni Somaru Nichirin" (Japanese: 漆黒に染まる日輪)	Shōji Yonemura	October 11, 2017	November 11, 2018	February 13, 2021
23	"A Grim Tale" / Genome's Giant; Transliteration: "Genomu no Kyojin" (Japanese: ゲノムの巨人)	Shōji Yonemura	October 18, 2017	November 17, 2018	February 20, 2021
24	"To Gore Or Not To Gore" / Dark Mask's Burden of Fate; Transliteration: "Dāku Masuku ga Seou Shukumei" (Japanese: ダークマスクが背負う宿命)	Shōji Yonemura, Atsushi Maekawa	October 25, 2017	November 18, 2018	February 20, 2021
25	"Suture the Circuit" / Virus Deck Operation; Transliteration: "Wirusu Dekki Operēshon" (Japanese: ウィルスデッキ・オペレーション)	Atsushi Maekawa	November 1, 2017	November 24, 2018	February 27, 2021
26	"Diagnosis: Deletion" / Three Draws Leading to Hope; Transliteration: "Kibō o Michibiku Surī Dorō" (Japanese: 希望を導くスリー・ドロー)	Atsushi Maekawa	November 8, 2017	November 25, 2018	February 27, 2021
27	"The Brave Battler" / Shima Naoki the Fighter; Transliteration: "Tatakau Otoko, Shima Naoki" (Japanese: 闘う男、島直樹闘う男、島直樹)	Mitsutaka Hirota	November 15, 2017	December 1, 2018	March 6, 2021
28	"Bugging Out" / Final Commander of the Three Knights; Transliteration: "Sankishi, Saigo no Shō" (Japanese: 三騎士、最後の将三騎士、最後の将)	Mitsutaka Hirota	November 22, 2017	December 2, 2018	March 6, 2021
29	"Kolter's Khronicles" / Kusanagi Report; Transliteration: "Kusanagi Repōto" (Japanese: クサナギレポートクサナギレポート)	Atsushi Maekawa	November 29, 2017	December 8, 2018	March 13, 2021
30	"Under VRAINS" / Doorway to the Abyss; Transliteration: "Naraku e no Tobira" (Japanese: 奈落への扉奈落への扉)	Junki Takegami	December 6, 2017	December 9, 2018	March 13, 2021
31	"Showdown in the Sewers" / The Final Trigger; Transliteration: "Shūmatsu no Torigā" (Japanese: 終末のトリガー)	Junki Takegami	December 13, 2017	December 15, 2018	March 20, 2021
32	"The Tower of Hanoi" / Tower of Hanoi; Transliteration: "Hanoi no Tō" (Japanese: ハノイの塔ハノイの塔)	Shōji Yonemura	December 20, 2017	December 16, 2018	March 20, 2021
33	"Once Upon a Time" / Angel With Blue Tears; Transliteration: "Aoi Namida no Tenshi" (Japanese: 青い涙の天使青い涙の天使)	Shōji Yonemura	December 27, 2017	December 22, 2018	March 27, 2021
34	"Roots of Evil" / The Sacred Tree; Transliteration: "Seinaru Tenju" (Japanese: 聖なる天樹聖なる天樹)	Shōji Yonemura	January 10, 2018	December 23, 2018	March 27, 2021
35	"The Hollow" / Other Lost Incident; Transliteration: "Mō Hitotsu no Rosuto Jiken" (Japanese: もう一つのロスト事件もう一つのロスト事件)	Shin Yoshida	January 17, 2018	December 29, 2018	April 3, 2021
36	"A Bridge Too Far" / Useless Justice; Transliteration: "Kudaranai Seigi" (Japanese: くだらない正義くだらない正義)	Mitsutaka Hirota	January 24, 2018	December 30, 2018	April 3, 2021
37	"Out on a Limb" / My Mother Tree; Transliteration: "Waga Hahanaru Ju" (Japanese: 我が母なる樹我が母なる樹)	Mitsutaka Hirota	January 31, 2018	January 5, 2019	April 10, 2021
38	"Looking Back" / Hanoi's Recollection; Transliteration: "Hanoi no Tsuisō" (Japanese: ハノイの追想)	Junki Takegami	February 7, 2018	January 6, 2019	April 10, 2021
39	"Ring the Bell" / Bullet Buried in Darkness; Transliteration: "Yami ni Hōmuru Dangan" (Japanese: 闇に葬る弾丸)	Atsushi Maekawa	February 14, 2018	January 12, 2019	April 17, 2021
40	"Gore at War" / Thirst for Victory; Transliteration: "Shōri e no Katsubō" (Japanese: 勝利への渇望勝利への渇望)	Atsushi Maekawa	February 21, 2018	January 13, 2019	April 17, 2021
41	"Truth and Consequences" / Deceitful Truth; Transliteration: "Azamukareta Jijitsu" (Japanese: 欺かれた事実欺かれた事実)	Junki Takegami	February 28, 2018	January 19, 2019	April 24, 2021
42	"Storm Access" / Stardust Road's Guidance; Transliteration: "Sutādasuto Rōdo no Michibiki" (Japanese: スターダストロードの導き)	Junki Takegami	March 7, 2018	January 20, 2019	April 24, 2021
43	"The Reveal" / Birth of the Ignis; Transliteration: "Igunisu no Tanjō" (Japanese: イグニスの誕生イグニスの誕生)	Shin Yoshida	March 14, 2018	January 26, 2019	May 1, 2021
44	"Illusion of Hope" / Prisoner of Destiny; Transliteration: "Unmei no Shūjin" (Japanese: 運命の囚人運命の囚人)	Shin Yoshida, Masaaki Tachihara	March 21, 2018	January 27, 2019	May 1, 2021
45	"Standing Tall" / Duel in the Extreme Domain; Transliteration: "Kyokugen Ryōiki no Dyueru" (Japanese: 極限領域のデュエル極限領域のデュエル)	Shin Yoshida, Masaaki Tachihara	March 28, 2018	February 2, 2019	May 8, 2021
46	"Link to the Future" / The Circuit That Draws the Future; Transliteration: "Mirai o Egakidasu Sākitto" (Japanese: 未来を描き出すサーキット)	Shin Yoshida, Masaaki Tachihara	April 4, 2018	February 3, 2019	May 8, 2021

=== Season 2 (2018–19) ===
No. overall	No. in season	English dub title / Japanese translated title	Written by	Original release date	English air date
47	1	"Link VRAINS 2.0" / Playmaker Returns; Transliteration: "Kaette-kita Pureimēkā" (Japanese: 帰ってきたPlaymaker)	Shin Yoshida	April 11, 2018	September 8, 2019
48	2	"Shed Some Light" / Judgment Arrow; Transliteration: "Sabaki no Ya" (Japanese: 裁きの矢)	Masaaki Tachihara	April 18, 2018	September 15, 2019
49	3	"Bring the Heat" / Duelist Clad in Flames; Transliteration: "Honō o Matoishi Dyuerisuto" (Japanese: 炎をまといし決闘者)	Masaaki Tachihara	April 25, 2018	September 22, 2019
50	4	"A Common Cause" / Transfer Student Takeru Homura; Transliteration: "Tenkōsei, Homura Takeru" (Japanese: 転校生、穂村尊)	Shin Yoshida	May 2, 2018	September 29, 2019
51	5	"Bounty Hunting" / Man Who Gave Up Charisma; Transliteration: "Karisuma o Suteta Otoko" (Japanese: カリスマを捨てた男)	Atsushi Maekawa	May 9, 2018	October 6, 2019
52	6	"Tapping Out" / Hero In Name Only; Transliteration: "Na Bakari no Eiyū" (Japanese: 名ばかりの英雄)	Atsushi Maekawa	May 16, 2018	October 13, 2019
53	7	"The Shepherd" / Bounty Hunter Blood Shepherd; Transliteration: "Baunti Hantā Buraddo Shepādo" (Japanese: 賞金稼ぎブラッドシェパード)	Mitsutaka Hirota	May 23, 2018	October 20, 2019
54	8	"Game of Drones" / Terrifying Battledrone; Transliteration: "Senritsu no Batoru Dorōn" (Japanese: 戦慄のバトルドローン)	Mitsutaka Hirota	May 30, 2018	October 27, 2019
55	9	"A Windy Welcome" / To the Unknown World; Transliteration: "Michi-naru Sekai e" (Japanese: 未知なる世界へ)	Shin Yoshida	June 6, 2018	November 3, 2019
56	10	"Blue Gal Battles!" / Blue Girl's First Battle! Transliteration: "Uijin! Burū Gāru" (Japanese: 初陣！ブルーガール)	Junki Takegami	June 13, 2018	November 10, 2019
57	11	"Bohman Returns!" / Final Battle Above the Clouds; Transliteration: "Unjō no Kessen" (Japanese: 雲上の決戦)	Masaaki Tachihara	June 20, 2018	November 17, 2019
58	12	"Memory Games" / Soul of Replica; Transliteration: "Repurika no Tamashī" (Japanese: レプリカの魂)	Masaaki Tachihara	July 4, 2018	November 24, 2019
59	13	"Return of the Hanoi" / Hanoi Returns; Transliteration: "Hanoi Saishidō" (Japanese: ハノイ再始動)	Shin Yoshida	July 11, 2018	December 1, 2019
60	14	"Sidekick Showdown" / Brave Max the Loser; Transliteration: "Haiboku no Bureivu Makkusu" (Japanese: 敗北のブレイヴ・マックス)	Mitsutaka Hirota	July 18, 2018	December 8, 2019
61	15	"Darkness Dawns" / Despair from Darkness; Transliteration: "Yami yori Ideshi Zetsubō" (Japanese: 闇より出でし絶望)	Mitsutaka Hirota	July 25, 2018	December 15, 2019
62	16	"Fearing the Worst" / The Ominous Ghost; Transliteration: "Imawashiki Bōrei" (Japanese: 忌まわしき亡霊)	Atsushi Maekawa	August 1, 2018	December 22, 2019
63	17	"Scare Tactics" / Reincarnating Flame; Transliteration: "Tensei-suru Honō" (Japanese: 転生する炎)	Atsushi Maekawa	August 8, 2018	December 29, 2019
64	18	"The Beginning" / Turning Point; Transliteration: "Tāning Pointo" (Japanese: ターニング・ポイント)	Junki Takegami	August 15, 2018	January 5, 2020
65	19	"Pieces of the Puzzle" / Playmaker's Breath; Transliteration: "Pureimēkā no Ibuki" (Japanese: Playmakerの息吹)	Masahiro Hikokubo	August 22, 2018	January 12, 2020
66	20	"Contact" / Earth Ignis "Earth"; Transliteration: "Chi no Igunisu - Āsu" (Japanese: 地のイグニス「アース」)	Atsushi Maekawa	August 29, 2018	January 19, 2020
67	21	"Choosing Sides" / AI's Longing; Transliteration: "Ēai ni Yadoru Bojō" (Japanese: AIに宿る慕情)	Atsushi Maekawa	September 5, 2018	January 26, 2020
68	22	"The Doorway" / Secret Meeting; Transliteration: "Mikkai" (Japanese: 密会)	Shin Yoshida	September 12, 2018	February 2, 2020
69	23	"Coexistence" / Mission That Must Be Accomplished; Transliteration: "Hatasu-beki Shimei" (Japanese: 果たすべき使命)	Mitsutaka Hirota	September 19, 2018	February 9, 2020
70	24	"A Storm Brews" / Tuning Bullet; Transliteration: "Chōritsu-suru Dangan" (Japanese: 調律する弾丸)	Mitsutaka Hirota	September 26, 2018	February 16, 2020
71	25	"A Logical Decision" / Declaration of War; Transliteration: "Sensen Fukoku" (Japanese: 宣戦布告)	Shin Yoshida	October 3, 2018	April 5, 2020
72	26	"Strategy Shift" / Clear Perfection; Transliteration: "Kumori-naki Kyokuchi" (Japanese: 曇りなき極致)	Shin Yoshida	October 10, 2018	April 12, 2020
73	27	"Weathering the Storm" / Light Blade that Slices Despair; Transliteration: "Zetsubō o Tatsu Kōjin" (Japanese: 絶望を絶つ光刃)	Shin Yoshida	October 17, 2018	April 19, 2020
74	28	"Brain Hack" / Captured Ignis; Transliteration: "Toraware no Igunisu" (Japanese: 囚われのイグニス)	Masaaki Tachihara	October 24, 2018	April 26, 2020
75	29	"Earthfall" / The Demon Possessing His Heart; Transliteration: "Kokoro ni Toritsuku Oni" (Japanese: 心に取と付く鬼)	Masaaki Tachihara	October 31, 2018	May 3, 2020
76	30	"Awakened Memories" / Memories Brought Back; Transliteration: "Yobi-okosareru Kioku" (Japanese: 呼び起される記憶)	Atsushi Maekawa	November 7, 2018	May 10, 2020
77	31	"A Family Reunion" / Siblings in Conflict; Transliteration: "Ai'irenai Keimai" (Japanese: 相容れない兄妹)	Atsushi Maekawa	November 14, 2018	May 17, 2020
78	32	"From One Hunter To Another" / Rebellious Bounty Hunter; Transliteration: "Hankotsu no Bauntī Hantā" (Japanese: 反骨のバウンティハンター)	Junki Takegami	November 21, 2018	May 24, 2020
79	33	"The Hunt Is On" / Speed of Light - Lightning; Transliteration: "Kōsoku no Raitoningu" (Japanese: 光速のライトニング)	Junki Takegami	November 28, 2018	May 31, 2020
80	34	"Lightning Strikes" / Bounty Hunter's Duty; Transliteration: "Bauntī Hantā no Tsutome" (Japanese: 賞金稼ぎの務め)	Junki Takegami	December 5, 2018	June 7, 2020
81	35	"Heart of Darkness" / Arrived at the Summit; Transliteration: "Tadori-tsuita Itadaki" (Japanese: たどり着いた頂)	Mitsutaka Hirota	December 12, 2018	June 14, 2020
82	36	"Gored" / What's Beyond Instincts; Transliteration: "Honnō no Saki ni Aru Mono" (Japanese: 本能の先にあるもの)	Mitsutaka Hirota	December 19, 2018	June 21, 2020
83	37	"Reaching Out" / Irregular Meeting; Transliteration: "Iregyurā Mītingu" (Japanese: イレギュラー・ミーティング)	Shin Yoshida, Masaaki Tachihara	December 26, 2018	September 6, 2020
84	38	"Payback" / Past That Cannot Be Quieted; Transliteration: "Shizumaranai Kako" (Japanese: 静まらない過去)	Shin Yoshida	January 9, 2019	September 13, 2020
85	39	"My Brother's Keeper" / True Tears; Transliteration: "Itsuwari-naki Namida" (Japanese: 偽りなき涙)	Masaaki Tachihara	January 16, 2019	September 20, 2020
86	40	"The Weakest Link" / Wisdom of the Deprived; Transliteration: "Motazaru-mono no Chie" (Japanese: 持たざる者の知恵)	Shin Yoshida	January 23, 2019	September 27, 2020
87	41	"The Ultimate Connection" / Chain Destruction; Transliteration: "Rensa Hakai" (Japanese: 連鎖破壊)	Shin Yoshida	January 30, 2019	October 4, 2020
88	42	"A Breezy Battle" / Windy the Revenger; Transliteration: "Ribenjā Uindi" (Japanese: リベンジャー・ウインディ)	Mitsutaka Hirota	February 6, 2019	October 11, 2020
89	43	"Fan the Flames" / The Uniting Two Flames; Transliteration: "Kasanaru Futatsu no Hi" (Japanese: 重なる二つの火)	Mitsutaka Hirota	February 13, 2019	October 18, 2020
90	44	"For A Friend" / Creator of the Next Generation; Transliteration: "Jisedai no Sōzōshu" (Japanese: 次世代の創造主)	Atsushi Maekawa	February 20, 2019	October 25, 2020
91	45	"From The Heart" / Proud Maiden; Transliteration: "Hokori-takaki Otome" (Japanese: 誇り高き乙女)	Atsushi Maekawa	February 27, 2019	November 1, 2020
92	46	"Friend And Foe" / Big Test; Transliteration: "Ōinaru Shiren" (Japanese: 大いなる試練)	Junki Takegami	March 6, 2019	November 8, 2020
93	47	"Fighting Promise" / Promise to Each Other; Transliteration: "Kawashita Yakusoku" (Japanese: 交わした約束)	Junki Takegami	March 13, 2019	November 15, 2020
94	48	"No Matter What It Takes" / Raging Soul; Transliteration: "Takeru Tamashī" (Japanese: 猛る魂)	Atsushi Maekawa	March 20, 2019	November 22, 2020
95	49	"From the Ashes" / Radiance of the Phoenix; Transliteration: "Fushichō no Kagayaki" (Japanese: 不死鳥の輝き)	Atsushi Maekawa	March 27, 2019	November 29, 2020
96	50	"I Know Your Secret" / Lightning's Crime; Transliteration: "Raitoningu no Tsumi" (Japanese: ライトニングの罪)	Shin Yoshida	April 3, 2019	December 6, 2020
97	51	"Outsmart, Outwit, Outthink!" / Ignis Unification Plan; Transliteration: "Igunisu Tōgō Keikaku" (Japanese: イグニス統合計画)	Shin Yoshida	April 10, 2019	December 13, 2020
98	52	"Lightning Storm" / The AI Crosses the Line; Transliteration: "Issen o Koeta Ēai" (Japanese: 一線を越えたAI)	Shin Yoshida	April 17, 2019	December 20, 2020
99	53	"Bohman's End Game" / Door to the New World; Transliteration: "Shinsekai no Tobira" (Japanese: 新世界の扉)	Mitsutaka Hirota	April 24, 2019	December 27, 2020
100	54	"I Know Everything" / Twisted Utopia; Transliteration: "Nejireta Risōkyō" (Japanese: ねじれた理想郷)	Mitsutaka Hirota	May 1, 2019	January 3, 2021
101	55	"Ai of the Beholder" / Unwavering Instinct; Transliteration: "Mayoi-naki Honnō" (Japanese: 迷いなき本能)	Mitsutaka Hirota	May 8, 2019	January 10, 2021
102	56	"The Final Turn" / Entrusted Wishes; Transliteration: "Yudanerareta Negai" (Japanese: 委ねられた願い)	Shin Yoshida	May 15, 2019	January 17, 2021
103	57	"Reflections" / "Journey to the End"; Transliteration: "Owari e no Tabidachi" (Japanese: 終わりへの旅立ち)	Masaaki Tachihara	May 22, 2019	January 24, 2021

=== Season 3 (2019) ===
No. overall	No. in season	English dub title / Japanese translated title	Written by	Original release date	English air date
104	1	"Your Reign is Over" / "Declaring A Crime"; Transliteration: "Hanko Seimei" (Japanese: 犯行声明)	Shin Yoshida	May 29, 2019	January 31, 2021 (Note: The English dub of Yu-Gi-Oh! VRAINS episodes 104–108 first premiered in Canada on Teletoon.)
105	2	"Unlikely Alliance" / "Intercept"; Transliteration: "Geigeki" (Japanese: 迎撃)	Shin Yoshida	June 5, 2019	February 7, 2021
106	3	"Roboppi Mops Up" / "Good Luck, Roboppy!!"; Transliteration: "Ganbare!! Roboppi" (Japanese: がんばれ！！ロボッピ)	Masaaki Tachihara	June 12, 2019	February 14, 2021
107	4	"Cleaning House" / "Slay the Demon"; Transliteration: "Oni o Utsu" (Japanese: 鬼を討つ)	Masaaki Tachihara	June 19, 2019	February 21, 2021
108	5	"Smash and Mash" / "Indomitable Spirit"; Transliteration: "Futōfukutsu no Seishin" (Japanese: 不撓不屈の精神)	Shin Yoshida, Masaaki Tachihara	July 3, 2019	February 28, 2021
109	6	"AI vs. AI" / "The Ignis Hunter"; Transliteration: "Igunisu o Karu Mono" (Japanese: イグニスを狩るもの)	Shin Yoshida	July 10, 2019	August 27, 2021 (Note: The English dub of Yu-Gi-Oh! VRAINS episodes 109–120 first premiered in Australia on 9Go!.)
110	7	"Siblings and Circuits" / "Ai's Sad Frustration"; Transliteration: "Ai no Iradachi" (Japanese: 哀の苛立ち)	Atsushi Maekawa	July 17, 2019	August 30, 2021
111	8	"Stronger Together" / "Wanting to Fight Each Other"; Transliteration: "Semegiau Ishi" (Japanese: せめぎ合う意思)	Atsushi Maekawa	July 24, 2019	August 31, 2021
112	9	"All Hail Roboppi!" / "SOL's Decline"; Transliteration: "Soru sha no Chōraku" (Japanese: SOL社の凋落)	Shin Yoshida, Junki Takegami	July 31, 2019	September 1, 2021
113	10	"Roboppi's World" / "King of Appliances"; Transliteration: "Kaden no Ōsama" (Japanese: 家電の王様)	Junki Takegami	August 7, 2019	September 2, 2021
114	11	"The Chosen One" / "Dreaming Roboppy"; Transliteration: "Yumemiru Roboppi" (Japanese: 夢見るロボッピ)	Junki Takegami	August 14, 2019	September 3, 2021
115	12	"Unfinished Business" / "Where It All Began"; Transliteration: "Hajimari no Basho" (Japanese: 始まりの場所)	Mitsutaka Hirota	August 21, 2019	September 6, 2021
116	13	"Stuck in the Past" / "Complete Combustion"; Transliteration: "Kanzen Nenshō" (Japanese: 完全燃焼)	Mitsutaka Hirota	August 28, 2019	September 7, 2021
117	14	"Forced Hand" / "Parallel Paths"; Transliteration: "Majiwaranai Michi" (Japanese: 交わらない道)	Shin Yoshida	September 4, 2019	September 8, 2021
118	15	"Alone Together" / "Reckless Proposal"; Transliteration: "Mubō na Teian" (Japanese: 無謀な提案)	Shin Yoshida	September 11, 2019	September 9, 2021
119	16	"A Losing Battle" / "A Broken Ego"; Transliteration: "Kowareyuku Jiga" (Japanese: 壊れゆく自我)	Shin Yoshida	September 18, 2019	September 10, 2021
120	17	"Journey's End" / "Connected World"; Transliteration: "Tsunagaru Sekai" (Japanese: 繋がる世界)	Shin Yoshida	September 25, 2019	September 13, 2021
