= Bubble (Band-Maid song) =

Single by Band-Maid

from the album Conqueror
- B-side: "Smile"
- Released: January 16, 2019
- Length: 6:42
- Label: Crown Stones
- Songwriters: Miku Kobato; Band-Maid

Band-Maid singles chronology
"Glory" (2019)	"Bubble" (2019)	"Different" (2020)

Music video
- Band-Maid "Bubble" on YouTube

"Bubble" is the fifth single by Japanese rock band Band-Maid, released in Japan on January 16, 2019, by Crown Stones. The song was used as the theme song for the Japanese drama show Perfect Crime. It was released on the same day as "Glory".

== Composition and lyrics ==
The lyrics for "Bubble" were inspired by the manga Perfect Crime. Rhythm guitarist/vocalist Miku Kobato wrote the lyrics to be "good enough so that those who read the original would appreciate it". They were originally going to use one of their unreleased songs for the show, but lead guitarist Kanami Tōno "realized that the demo I just happened to be working on at the time was a better fit for the drama."

The lyrics for "Smile" were written as a thank you to their fans. The music was written by their long time collaborator, Kentaro Akutsu, because some of his compositions are considered popular by fans and they thought that their fans would enjoy another composition by him.

== Critical reception ==
JaME said that the title track "...mixes slow parts with sudden adrenaline outbursts" and that "We bet you will return to this song over and over again for fuelling[sic] up." And said that "Smile"'s use of "...acoustic guitar and Saiki's warm vocal" "...creates a soft, cosy atmosphere, which wraps you up like a comfortable blanket, while the other instruments serve as support." Marc Bowie of J-Generation called the title track "...a typically melodic pounder" and that it "...features a crunching riff".

== Music video ==
The music video for "Bubble" was released on January 15, 2019. The music video is a tribute to the Queen biographical film Bohemian Rhapsody.

== Live performances ==
Live versions of "Bubble" were later released on their video albums Band-Maid World Domination Tour [Shinka] at Line Cube Shibuya (Shibuya Public Hall) and Band-Maid Online Okyu-Ji (Feb. 11, 2021).

== Track listing ==
CD

All lyrics are written by Miku Kobato.

No.	Title	Music	Length
1.	"Bubble"	Band-Maid	3:45
2.	"Smile"	Kentaro Akutsu	3:57

== Credits and personnel ==
Band-Maid members

- Miku Kobato – vocals, guitar
- Saiki Atsumi – vocals
- Kanami Tōno – guitar
- Misa – bass
- Akane Hirose – drums

Recording and management

- Sound Produced by Band-Maid, Tienowa (track 1), Kentaro Akutsu (track 2)
- Recorded at Nasoundra Palace Studio
- Recording engineer: Masyoshi Yamamoto
- Mixed at Mix Forest
- Mix engineer: Masahiko Fukui
- Mastered by Masahiko Fukui
- Art Direction: Satoshi Kohno
- Account Executive: Motoki Hirota
- Design by Akira Yamaguchi, Kazu Yamamoto, Misaki Fujioka

== Charts ==
Chart (2019)	Peak position
Japan (Oricon)	14
Japan Top Singles Sales (Billboard)	13

== Release history ==
Region	Date	Format	Label	Catalog	Note
Japan	January 16, 2019	CD	Crown Tokuma	CRCP-10420	(Note: The acoustic version of "Anemone" was handed out as a limited bonus CD with certain in-store/online purchases. In addition, the "Glory" single, which was released on the same day, was likewise accompanied by the "Puzzle" acoustic version CD, and with the purchase of both singles at the same time, the "Onset" CD was also handed out as an additional bonus.)
Japan	January 16, 2019	Digital download	Crown Tokuma		
Worldwide	January 16, 2019	Digital download	Crown Tokuma		
