= Start Over (Band-Maid song) =

Single by Band-Maid
- B-side: "Screaming"
- Released: July 25, 2018
- Label: Crown Stones
- Songwriters: Miku Kobato; Band-Maid

Band-Maid singles chronology
"Daydreaming/Choose Me" (2017)	"Start Over" (2018)	"Glory" (2019)

Music video
- Band-Maid "Start Over" on YouTube

"Start Over" is the fourth single by Japanese rock band Band-Maid, released in Japan on July 25, 2018, by Crown Stones.

== Composition and lyrics ==
"Start Over" was written in a more pop oriented style, as opposed to their usual hard rock. Lead guitarist Kanami Tōno, plays the piano in the song. It was lead vocalist Saiki Atsumi's idea to include piano, as well as to not have a guitar solo. The lyrics were written to be easy to sing in karaoke, as many of their fans expressed difficulty in singing their songs. There were originally more English lyrics, but Atsumi told rhythm guitarist/vocalist Miku Kobato, to cut down on them. For the lyrics, Kobato had in mind a theme of contradictory love and that she didn't want to make the lyrics too dark or too cute. Kobato included the lyrics "I don't give a fuck" at the end of the song because she didn't want the song to end poppy.

For "Screaming", they wanted to make a song that was more like Band-Maid's previous songs. It was originally going to be included on their album Conqueror, but ultimately, a new song, "Dilemma", was chosen instead. The tempo is 215. It originally had a slower tempo. In 2019, as Band-Maiko, they released an alternate version with traditional Japanese instruments and lyrics rewritten in the Kyoto dialect.

== Background and release ==
The single was released in three versions: a limited edition which contains the CD, a Blu-ray of a concert recorded at Zepp Tokyo on April 13, 2018, a postcard and an additional CD containing "Secret Maiko Lips", a second limited edition which contains the CD and a DVD of the aforementioned concert, and a standard edition which only contains the CD.

== Critical reception ==
Marc Bowie of J-Generation said that the title track is "catchy as hell, the song blends jazzy piano, palm-muted guitar and sinuous bass work with a crunchy chorus." Trent Cannon of Rice Digital said that the title track "...is a great track that is a little bit slower, featuring a bit of piano to lighten the mood."

== Music video ==
The music video for "Start Over" was released on July 3, 2018. French model Mitsugi appeared in the music video.

== Live performances ==
Live versions of "Screaming" were later released on their video albums Band-Maid World Domination Tour [Shinka] at Line Cube Shibuya (Shibuya Public Hall) and Band-Maid Online Okyu-Ji (Feb. 11, 2021).

== Track listing ==
CD

All lyrics are written by Miku Kobato; all music is composed by Band-Maid.

No.	Title	Length
1.	"Start Over"	3:15
2.	"Screaming"	3:47

Bonus CD
No.	Title	Lyrics	Music	Length
1.	"Secret Maiko Lips" (as Band-Maiko)	Kobato	Band-Maid	4:24

DVD/Blu-ray

All lyrics are written by Miku Kobato, except where indicated; all music is composed by Band-Maid, except where indicated.

No.	Title	Lyrics	Music	Length
1.	"Domination"
2.	"Play"
3.	"Spirit!!"
4.	"The Non-Fiction Days"	Kanata Nakamura	Toshinari Ohnishi
5.	"Moratorium" (モラトリアム)
6.	"Alive-or-Dead"
7.	"Cross"	Nora; Kobato	Nora
8.	"Turn Me On"		Kentaro Akutsu; Band-Maid
9.	"Don't You Tell Me"	Kobato; Saiki Atsumi
10.	"Daydreaming"	Kobato; Atsumi
11.	"One and Only"
12.	"Puzzle" (Acoustic)
13.	"Anemone" (Acoustic)
14.	"Dice"
15.	"Secret My Lips"
16.	"Clang"
17.	"Fate"		Akutsu; Band-Maid
18.	"Onset"	Instrumental
19.	"Carry On Living"
20.	"Alone"	Kobato; Atsumi
21.	"Rock in Me"
22.	"I Can't Live Without You"
23.	"You."
24.	"Freedom"		Ichiro Iguchi
25.	"Real Existence"	Miwa Sagaki	Koji Goto (ck 510)
26.	"Choose Me"

== Credits and personnel ==
Band-Maid members

- Misa – bass
- Miku Kobato – vocals, guitar
- Saiki Atsumi – vocals
- Akane Hirose – drums
- Kanami Tōno – guitar

Recording and management

- Recorded at Nasoundra Palace Studio
- Recording engineer: Masyoshi Yamamoto
- Mixed at Mix Forest
- Mix engineer: Masahiko Fukui
- Mastered by Masahiko Fukui
- Art Direction: Satoshi Kohno
- Photography: Kaori Uemura

== Charts ==
Chart (2018)	Peak position
Japan (Oricon)	16
Japan (Billboard)	65
Japan Top Singles Sales (Billboard)	16

== Release history ==
Region	Date	Format	Label	Edition(s)
Japan	July 25, 2018	CD; digital download	Crown Tokuma	Standard edition
Japan	July 25, 2018	2xCD with Blu-ray	Crown Tokuma	Limited edition
Japan	July 25, 2018	CD with DVD	Crown Tokuma	Limited edition
Worldwide	July 25, 2018	Digital download	Crown Tokuma	Standard edition
