= Yu-Gi-Oh! VRAINS season 2 =

Yu-Gi-Oh! VRAINS
- Season 2
- No. of episodes: 57

Release
- Original network: TV Tokyo
- Original release: April 11, 2018 – May 15, 2019

Season chronology
- ← Previous; Season 1 Next → Season 3

Yu-Gi-Oh! VRAINS is the fifth main spin-off anime series in the Yu-Gi-Oh! franchise and the ninth anime series overall. It is produced by Gallop and broadcast by TV Tokyo. The series is directed by Masahiro Hosoda. The series follows Yusaku Fujiki. It takes place in a high school environment in Den City. The series features Charisma Duelists who use VR and are similar to YouTubers. The show's theme is "Let's take one step forward and try it!" This season follows Yusaku and his allies who become involved in the war between the Ignis and humanity, spearheaded by the Light Ignis Lightning and the advanced A.I "Bohman". This season uses five theme songs. From episodes 47–102, the first opening theme is "Go Forward" by Kimeru. From episodes 47–70, the first ending theme is "BOY" by uchuu. From episodes 71–95, the second ending theme is "Glory" (グローリー, Gurōrī) by Band-Maid. From episodes 96–103, the third ending theme is "Are You Ready?" (Are(アー) you(ユー) ready(レディ)？, Ā Yū Redi?) by Bis. From episode 103, the opening theme is "Calling" (コーリング, Kōringu) by Kimeru.

The English dub of the season aired in Canada on Teletoon from September 2019 to January 2021.

== Episode list ==
No. overall	No. in season	English dub title / Japanese translated title	Written by	Original release date	English air date
47	1	"Link VRAINS 2.0" / Playmaker Returns; Transliteration: "Kaette-kita Pureimēkā" (Japanese: 帰ってきたPlaymaker)	Shin Yoshida	April 11, 2018	September 8, 2019
Three months after the final battle against the Knights of Hanoi, Ai finally returns to Cyberse World. Ai finds it has already been destroyed. The other Ignis are gone. Ai finds Linkuriboh remains there. SOL Technologies has completely rebooted LINK VRAINS into New LINK VRAINS. Despite having saved LINK VRAINS, SOL Technologies put a bounty on Playmaker, as they believe he is still holding Ai. A higher-up of SOL Technologies known as Queen forcibly orders Akira to work with a Bounty Hunter team that consists of the Gore, his two partners, and a Bounty Hunter called the Shepherd to hunt down Playmaker to retrieve the Ignis. At a hospital, Jin is attacked by an unknown assailant, who stole his consciousness. Kolter asks for Yusaku's help to chase the culprit. This leads Playmaker to return to LINK VRAINS. While chasing the assailant, Ai and Linkuriboh return to Playmaker's duel disk and assist him in dueling the mysterious duelist, by giving him new cards.
48	2	"Shed Some Light" / Judgment Arrow; Transliteration: "Sabaki no Ya" (Japanese: 裁きの矢)	Masaaki Tachihara	April 18, 2018	September 15, 2019
Using his new Ritual Monster that he received from Ai, Playmaker counters the mysterious duelist's attack and reveals his opponent's real avatar, Bohman. Bohman tries to stop Playmaker's advances by only allowing Playmaker to attack with one monster, through the effect of his monster. However, Playmaker uses Storm Access to gain a new monster, Shootingcode Talker, whose effect allows it to attack three times in a row. Playmaker defeats Bohman. Ai attempted to eat his data, but Bohman's younger brother, Haru, has implanted an anti-Ignis program, which stops Ai from gaining Bohman's data. As he is escaping with Bohman, Harlin summons two duelists named Bit and Boot to delay Playmaker and retrieve Ai. Before the duel could commence between them, a duelist named Soulburner appears with the fire Ignis, Flame. Soulburner and Flame challenge Bit and Boot, while Playmaker continues his chase for Harlin and Bohman.
49	3	"Bring the Heat" / Duelist Clad in Flames; Transliteration: "Honō o Matoishi Dyuerisuto" (Japanese: 炎をまといし決闘者)	Masaaki Tachihara	April 25, 2018	September 22, 2019
Soulburner and Flame commence the duel against Bit and Boot who merged their avatars together. Using their D-Scale monsters' effect combo together with Link Spell similar to Bohman's, they are able to deal considerable damage to Soulburner. Soulburner counters by destroying their Link Spell, Judgement Arrow, with his ace monster, Salamangreat Heatleo's effect. However, as Bit and Boot were two avatars merged into one, they are able to use the same Skill twice to return Judgment Arrow and locked Soulburner's card effects. Cornered, Soulburner uses his Skill, Burning Draw, to draw Salamangreat Sanctuary. Soulburner uses it to perform a Reincarnation Link Summon, which summons a new Heatleo using the first Heatleo. Soulburner uses its effect to defeat Bit and Boot. Meanwhile, despite Playmaker's best effort, Harlin and Bohman successfully escaped by entering the restricted area.
50	4	"A Common Cause" / Transfer Student Takeru Homura; Transliteration: "Tenkōsei, Homura Takeru" (Japanese: 転校生、穂村尊)	Shin Yoshida	May 2, 2018	September 29, 2019
Harlin and Bohman give Jin's data to a mysterious figure who is also their leader. Bohman demands him to return his and Haru's memories, but the man erased Bohman's memories of the agreement. At school, Soulburner's real life, Theodore Hamilton, and Flame, approaches Yusaku and Ai. Theodore reveals himself to be a victim of the Lost Incident and knew of Yusaku's identity with Flame's help. Flame reveals that after Ai was gone, he and the other Ignis were discussing whether to trust humans with their technologies so they can coexist or not. Before they can reach a conclusion, a new enemy who used the same Link Spell as the one who stole Jin's consciousness appeared and destroyed the Cyberse World, which forced all the other Ignis to split up. As they are sharing a common enemy, Yusaku, Ai, and Kolter agree to work with Theodore and Flame. Under Akira's instruction, Emma sends a tip off to Kolter on how to enter the restricted area of LINK VRAINS, where Bohman and Harlin have disappeared to. Following the lead, Playmaker and Soulburner infiltrated the restricted area, but the Gore and his teammates appear and pursue them.
51	5	"Bounty Hunting" / Man Who Gave Up Charisma; Transliteration: "Karisuma o Suteta Otoko" (Japanese: カリスマを捨てた男)	Atsushi Maekawa	May 9, 2018	October 6, 2019
The Gore and his team pursue Playmaker and Soulburner, but both of them are able to evade Gore's teammates by taking advantage of the trap that Akira launched. Interested in dueling against the Gore, Soulburner offers to take on Gore, while Playmaker and Ai go ahead of them. Flame is unable to predict Gore's strategy as he has changed his deck from Gouki to Dinowrestler deck. It is revealed that Gore threw away his reputation as a Celebrity Duelist and became a bounty hunter for SOL Technologies due to his frustration of being overshadowed by Playmaker, whose fame rose after defeating the Knights of Hanoi. The Gore is determined to defeat Playmaker to regain his pride, fame, and be number one title again. This disappoints Soulburner, who reveals that he admires the old Gore that gave him courage to move on by defeating the people responsible for the Lost Incident. Determined to bring back the old Gore, Soulburner begins his counterattack.
52	6	"Tapping Out" / Hero In Name Only; Transliteration: "Na Bakari no Eiyū" (Japanese: 名ばかりの英雄)	Atsushi Maekawa	May 16, 2018	October 13, 2019
Soulburner recounts his past when he was rescued after the Lost Incident. He learned from his grandparents that his parents looked for him every day, while he was missing. An accident occurred that took their lives away. Soulburner performs Reincarnation Link Summon to summon another copy of Heatleo and uses its effect to defeat Gore, but Gore manages to use his monster's effect to prevent Heatleo from attacking. The Gore counters using the combination of his monster and spell cards effects, but Soulburner manages to survive using his own Field Spell's effect to increase his life points. Soulburner uses Burning Draw to draw a Ritual Spell card that allows him to Ritual Summon Salamangreat Emerald Eagle and defeats Gore. Playmaker is close to reach the gate to where the enemies have disappeared to, but he is intercepted by the Shepherd.
53	7	"The Shepherd" / Bounty Hunter Blood Shepherd; Transliteration: "Baunti Hantā Buraddo Shepādo" (Japanese: 賞金稼ぎブラッドシェパード)	Mitsutaka Hirota	May 23, 2018	October 20, 2019
Playmaker is intercepted and forced to duel by the Shepherd on his way to the gate. As Playmaker brings out Shootingcode Talker to finish off his opponent quickly, however Shepherd baits him into a trap that seals away his Link monster. Shepherd brings out his ace monster, Battledrone General, and he prepares for his offense against Playmaker.
54	8	"Game of Drones" / Terrifying Battledrone; Transliteration: "Senritsu no Batoru Dorōn" (Japanese: 戦慄のバトルドローン)	Mitsutaka Hirota	May 30, 2018	October 27, 2019
The Shepherd begins his onslaught by using his Battledrone combo to deal damage to Playmaker while sealing away Storm Access. As Playmaker brings out his Ritual Monster, Cyberse Magician, but Shepherd counters it and pushes Playmaker into a corner. Refusing to give up as Ai proclaims his bond with Playmaker, the Shepherd has a flashback where it is revealed that an accident involving a driver less car derailed his entire life and created an everlasting hatred of AI in him. Playmaker uses Storm Access to obtain Clock Spartoi and fusion summons Cyberse Clock Dragon. Playmaker defeats the Shepherd.
55	9	"A Windy Welcome" / To the Unknown World; Transliteration: "Michi-naru Sekai e" (Japanese: 未知なる世界へ)	Shin Yoshida	June 6, 2018	November 3, 2019
Playmaker and Soulburner travel through the gate and enter an unknown world surrounded by powerful winds. Meanwhile, Ghost Gal and Blue Angel, who now uses a stealth avatar called Blue Gal, travel through the restricted area into the world of wind upon being instructed by Akira to find the remaining Ignis and discover their intentions. As the two search the world, they find the unconscious research team sent by SOL Technologies and use their emergency escape programs to help them log out. Playmaker and Soulburner manage to get past the winds and meet the wind Ignis, Windy, who distrusts humans and built a world of wind to regroup with the Ignis. Windy agrees to help on the condition of stopping Ghost Gal and Blue Gal. Unwilling to compromise with them, Blue Gal and Soulburner prepare to duel, while Playmaker goes after Bohman.
56	10	"Blue Gal Battles!" / Blue Girl's First Battle! Transliteration: "Uijin! Burū Gāru" (Japanese: 初陣！ブルーガール)	Junki Takegami	June 13, 2018	November 10, 2019
Blue Gal and Soulburner commence their duel. Following her defeat by Specter, Blue Gal has upgraded her Trickstar deck and begins pressuring Soulburner with continuous effect damage. Blue Gal seals away Soulburner's Burning Draw skill. Soulburner brings out Salamangreat Healeo and prepares to counterattack, while Blue Girl prevents Heatleo's ability and drives Soulburner into a corner. Blue Gal uses her new skill, Trickstar Gig, to bring out the fusion monster Trickstar Band Sweet Guitar and prepares to finish Soulburner off, who counters by fusion summoning Salamangreat Violet Chimera to finish her off. As Blue Gal ponders the bond between Soulburner and Flame, she logs out. Flame provides Ghost Gal with an escape program and allows her to withdraw as well. Meanwhile, Playmaker reaches the edge of the wind world and prepares to face off against Bohman once again.
57	11	"Bohman Returns!" / Final Battle Above the Clouds; Transliteration: "Unjō no Kessen" (Japanese: 雲上の決戦)	Masaaki Tachihara	June 20, 2018	November 17, 2019
A mysterious figure gives Bohman new memories as he wakes up and declares he will defeat Playmaker. Playmaker confronts Harlin and the new Bohman. Playmaker demands the return of Jin Kolter's consciousness if he wins. Bohman replies something else is in store for Playmaker should he lose. The two commence a Master Duel with Bohman bringing out a new monster, Twin Hydradrive Knight, while Playmaker brings out Update Jammer and Linkuriboh to deal damage to Bohman. As Playmaker counters Bohman's Property Spray, Bohman leads him into a trap with Hydradrive Cycle and pushes him into a corner. Bohman reveals his backstory of being a Lost Incident victim and claims he is the real Yusaku, while Playmaker is a clone. Bohman declares he will regain his body should he win.
58	12	"Memory Games" / Soul of Replica; Transliteration: "Repurika no Tamashī" (Japanese: レプリカの魂)	Masaaki Tachihara	July 4, 2018	November 24, 2019
As Ai ponders Bohman's claim of being the real Yusaku, Playmaker continues the duel. Playmaker proclaims that the winner will decide who is in the right. Playmaker brings out Detonate Deleter to destroy Twin Hydradrive Knight and deals significant damage. Playmaker soon realizes that someone has implanted Bohman with false memories, where it is revealed in a flashback that a young Yusaku ran into a young Revolver, who contributed to his capture for the Hanoi Project. Bohman unexpectedly uses Storm Access in a Master Duel to bring out Trident Hydradrive Lord and pushes Playmaker into a corner. Playmaker soon brings out Cyberse Clock Dragon and uses its special ability to defeat Bohman. As Harlin declares his brother will return, Playmaker regroups with Soulburner. Playmaker wonders who was controlling Bohman as he soon logs out.
59	13	"Return of the Hanoi" / Hanoi Returns; Transliteration: "Hanoi Saishidō" (Japanese: ハノイ再始動)	Shin Yoshida	July 11, 2018	December 1, 2019
Baira, the Deleted Virus creator and member of the Knights of Hanoi, is locked up in a high tech security prison under tight surveillance following the Tower of Hanoi. Meanwhile, Varis, Specter, Faust, and Dr. Genome reflect on the recent events following their defeat such as Cyberse World's destruction, the emergence of Soulburner and Flame, the mystery duelist Bohman, and the new gate that emerged in LINK VRAINS. Varis remarks that the Ignis created the gate with the intention of regrouping with one another and to be wary of Playmaker's recent mastery of Ritual and Fusion Summoning. Varis proposes to observe the Ignis and the new enemy for the time being. The Knights of Hanoi proceed to bail out Baira and proclaim their return. As Yusaku and Ai ponder the disappearance of Windy's gate, they receive news from Kolter of Baira's escape. Now facing a battle on three fronts: SOL Technologies, Knights of Hanoi, and Bohman, Yusaku notes that the new battle will be a tough one.
60	14	"Sidekick Showdown" / Brave Max the Loser; Transliteration: "Haiboku no Bureivu Makkusu" (Japanese: 敗北のブレイヴ・マックス)	Mitsutaka Hirota	July 18, 2018	December 8, 2019
Yusaku discusses with Kolter, Theodore, Ai, and Flame the aftermath of his recent duel regarding how Bohman had the same memories as him. Yusaku concludes that the unknown enemy knows all about his past. Meanwhile, Emma and Skye contemplate Playmaker's identity and decide to go after his "best friend", Shima, to find answers. Blue Angel lures Brave Max by deciding to hold an event, while Ghost Gal challenges him to a duel. The two girls realize he is a dummy and that it was all a waste of time. Kolter, Theodore, and Yusaku soon get news of a new gate in LINK VRAINS, which is in the top level. They decide to investigate and fall pray to a trap set by the Shepherd. Soulburner and Flame are captured as the former begins to recall memories of his past.
61	15	"Darkness Dawns" / Despair from Darkness; Transliteration: "Yami yori Ideshi Zetsubō" (Japanese: 闇より出でし絶望)	Mitsutaka Hirota	July 25, 2018	December 15, 2019
Emma discusses with Skye the appearance of a fake gate in LINK VRAINS designed to trap Playmaker and deduces that Shepherd is behind it. As Playmaker is left to contend with bounty hunters Kenmochi and Yoroizaka, the Shepherd begins searching through Soulburner's memories. Following his rescue from the Hanoi Project and learning that his parents died searching for him, Theodore becomes depressed and closed off over the years, while his grandfather encourages him to move forward and away from his past. Theodore soon encounters the fire Ignis Flame, who tells him about the Lost Incident and Playmaker, who is also a fellow victim that decided to face his destiny head on by defeating the Knights of Hanoi. Flame encourages Theodore to do the same. Meanwhile, Kiku is held hostage by a gang, which forces Takeru to duel the leader's younger brother, Ryujiro Mizunuma. Ryujiro pushes Takeru into a corner by constantly resurrecting his monsters and brings out Despair from the Dark, which is a monster that represents all of Takeru's trauma from the Lost Incident.
62	16	"Fearing the Worst" / The Ominous Ghost; Transliteration: "Imawashiki Bōrei" (Japanese: 忌まわしき亡霊)	Atsushi Maekawa	August 1, 2018	December 22, 2019
Refusing to abandon Soulburner, Playmaker fights off against Kenmochi and Yoroizaka. To lessen the threat, Ai forces Yoroizaka to log out by using the Data Storm, which allows Playmaker to fight and defeat Kenmochi first before Yoroizaka logs in again. Inside the gate, Soulburner wakes up and begins a duel against the Shepherd, where his AI explains every single effect of his cards. Soulburner seemingly manages to do well against the Shepherd until the bounty hunter reveals he has programmed his AI into lying about his card effects to trick Soulburner. Having scanned through Soulburner's memories, Shepherd takes advantage of Soulburner's trauma by summoning Despair from the Dark and adds two more copies of it, which greatly scares Soulburner.
63	17	"Scare Tactics" / Reincarnating Flame; Transliteration: "Tensei-suru Honō" (Japanese: 転生する炎)	Atsushi Maekawa	August 8, 2018	December 29, 2019
The Shepherd begins his onslaught using his three copies of Despair from the Dark, but Soulburner uses the effect of Salamangreat Parro to survive with 200 Life Points. Rather than succumbing to trauma, Soulburner uses Reincarnation Link Summon to bring out another Heatleo and combines it with Rising Fire to get rid of Despair from the Dark and reduce Blood Shepherd to 1200 Life Points. Soulburner and Flame reveal that they pretended to be in trouble and that the former overcame his trauma long ago, where the ending of the Soulburner versus Ryojiro duel is revealed. As Soulburner prepares to attack Shepherd, the latter is about to activate his face down card. Emma helps Kolter save Soulburner with the rescue program, which ends the duel before it could conclude. As Playmaker defeats Yoroizaka and logs out with Soulburner, the Shepherd confronts Ghost Gal for interfering despite his warning.
64	18	"The Beginning" / Turning Point; Transliteration: "Tāning Pointo" (Japanese: ターニング・ポイント)	Junki Takegami	August 15, 2018	January 5, 2020
Theodore and Yusaku are heading to Kolter's place, but Naoki shows up and starts talking to Yusaku. Theodore goes to see Kolter himself, while Ai crashes into him with his drone and reveals this feature to Theodore and Flame. As Theodore expresses his fascination with the work Yusaku and Kolter have done together, Ai and Flame eagerly ask Kolter to tell them how they met. Kolter reveals how the trauma Jin suffered due to the Hanoi Project caused him to become a professional hacker to uncover the truth regarding the incident. Kolter confronts the Knights of Hanoi as Unnamed. Unnamed runs into Yusaku, who went by the name Unknown, who advised him not to put himself in danger. Nonetheless, Kolter continues confronting the Knights of Hanoi only to be saved by Yusaku, who showcases his dueling prowess by defeating one of the Knights of Hanoi. Kolter saves Yusaku and advises him to stop by Café Nom. After meeting in person and expressing his desire to save his brother and to help Yusaku with his hacking prowess, Yusaku agrees to work together and reveals his identity to him.
65	19	"Pieces of the Puzzle" / Playmaker's Breath; Transliteration: "Pureimēkā no Ibuki" (Japanese: Playmakerの息吹)	Masahiro Hikokubo	August 22, 2018	January 12, 2020
The flashback regarding Yusaku and Kolter's backstory continues. Having heard rumors of a mysterious dungeon in LINK VRAINS that houses a Cyberse deck, Yusaku and Kolter decide to go after it. Inside the dungeon, they are forced to pass a duel quiz to obtain the deck, where they see a Knight of Hanoi lose helplessly to the guardian. Yusaku duels and successfully clears the challenge by utilizing all the cards available to him and through effect damage. All hope seems lost when no deck is found. However, Yusaku and Kolter search the real world. Yusaku reveals that the duel quiz is simply a map to the deck's location in Den City. Both manage to find the deck. They proclaim that it is the strongest weapon against the Knights of Hanoi and a symbol of their bond. Ai, Flame, and Takeru are intrigued by the story, but they wonder how exactly Yusaku became Playmaker. The flashback ends with Yusaku confronting a Knight of Hanoi. Yusaku calls himself Playmaker, where he is the emissary of revenge against the Knights of Hanoi.
66	20	"Contact" / Earth Ignis "Earth"; Transliteration: "Chi no Igunisu - Āsu" (Japanese: 地のイグニス「アース」)	Atsushi Maekawa	August 29, 2018	January 19, 2020
Ai browses through a LINK VRAINS message board about Playmaker and finds a hidden message from the EARTH Ignis requesting to meet Yusaku. Yusaku and Ai go into LINK VRAINS, where they meet the EARTH Ignis, Earth, who takes them to a separate world. Earth expresses his desire to duel Playmaker in order to discern humanity's true intentions, where it is revealed in a flashback that the WATER Ignis, Aqua, told him that the Ignis will soon be divided in their stance on humanity and must one day decide whether to coexist or forever be at odds with humans. The duel begins with Playmaker discerning that Earth's Lost Incident partner must be Specter due to the parallels between the two, while Earth remains adamant in rebuking humans for their role in Cyberse World's destruction. Earth summons G Golem Crystal Heart, which is a card that represents his bond with Aqua.
67	21	"Choosing Sides" / AI's Longing; Transliteration: "Ēai ni Yadoru Bojō" (Japanese: AIに宿る慕情)	Atsushi Maekawa	September 5, 2018	January 26, 2020
The duel between Earth and Playmaker continues. Earth uses G Golem Crystal Heart to revive and strengthen Invalid Dolmen, which deals significant damage to Playmaker. Playmaker brings out Cyberse Clock Dragon to counterattack, which manages to deal Earth damage. Earth continues his combo and destroys Clock Dragon. Ai remembers his interactions with Earth and Aqua and notes that Earth's deck reflects his feelings for Aqua. Earth asks Playmaker why he is with Ai. Playmaker responds that both have mutual enemies to face and fight side by side out of their own free will. Playmaker indirectly acknowledges that he and Ai are partners. Playmaker makes his comeback by summoning Clock Lizard, Cyberse Clock Dragon using 4 monsters, and uses Clock Lizard's effect to reduce all of Invalid Dolmen's attack points to zero. Playmaker finally defeats Earth. Earth reveals he actually knows nothing about Bohman and leaves. As Ai is frustrated about getting nowhere from the duel with Earth, Playmaker ponders Earth's words of Cyberse World falling apart. Playmaker feels something bad is going to happen soon.
68	22	"The Doorway" / Secret Meeting; Transliteration: "Mikkai" (Japanese: 密会)	Shin Yoshida	September 12, 2018	February 2, 2020
Ai suddenly disappears from Yusaku's duel disk and ends up in a place that looks like Cyberse World. Yusaku and Roboppy meet up with Kolter and Takeru to investigate and learn that Ai was lured to a website made from an Ignis algorithm. Yusaku decides to go to LINK VRAINS alone. He does not trust Windy since Bohman was found at the edge of the wind world, which also disappeared after Bohman lost. Ai finds Windy's palace, where he encounters Windy as well as the Light Ignis known as Lightning. Windy and Lightning discuss how they want to rebuild Cyberse World and how both of them strongly distrust humans. Dr. Kogami created the Ignis so they could guide humans and lengthen their lives as humanity's successors. However, Windy and Lightning want the Ignis to reign supreme and put humans under their control as their vessels. As Ai ponders Windy and Lightning's words, Playmaker shows up. Ai decides to help Playmaker find a way for humans and Ignis to coexist. Since they heard their schemes, Windy and Lightning trap Playmaker and Ai. As Windy is about to reprogram Ai, Varis shows up. Varis proclaims he will destroy the Ignis.
69	23	"Coexistence" / Mission That Must Be Accomplished; Transliteration: "Hatasu-beki Shimei" (Japanese: 果たすべき使命)	Mitsutaka Hirota	September 19, 2018	February 9, 2020
In order to eliminate all the Ignis, Varis launches an attack against Windy and all the other Ignis. Playmaker tries to talk some sense into Varis, but to no avail. Varis begins his duel against Windy.
70	24	"A Storm Brews" / Tuning Bullet; Transliteration: "Chōritsu-suru Dangan" (Japanese: 調律する弾丸)	Mitsutaka Hirota	September 26, 2018	February 16, 2020
The duel between Varis and Windy continues. Varis emphasizes that the Ignis do not care about coexisting with humans and actually encourage hostility. Varis reveals that Windy caused a car accident, which his human partner was in. Windy admits that he did so because he believes he does not need a human partner and says humans are just expendable to him and Lightning. Varis turns the duel around by summoning Speedburst Dragon and uses it to deal Windy the damage he was just dealt and destroys Stormridership Rockbuster. To counterattack, Windy uses Storm Access in a Master Duel, which makes Playmaker and Ai realize that Windy is involved with Bohman and knows Jin's whereabouts. Windy summons Stormridership Bahamut Bomber and drives Varis into a corner. Meanwhile, Specter escorts Soulburner and Flame to everyone, where the latter two free Playmaker and Ai. Varis defeats Windy by Synchro summoning Borreload Savage Dragon and proceeds to erase Windy, but he is stopped by Lightning. Deeming humanity dangerous for the Ignis' existence, Lightning reveals that he is allied with Bohman and Haru, and Jin is his human partner.
71	25	"A Logical Decision" / Declaration of War; Transliteration: "Sensen Fukoku" (Japanese: 宣戦布告)	Shin Yoshida	October 3, 2018	April 5, 2020
Lightning explains that the Ignis and their originators cannot help but affect each other, which will bring uncertainty. Lightning has Jin trapped within his own consciousness to place him under his complete control. Lightning further admits that he is the one who destroyed the Cyberse World in order to get rid of the Ignis who chose coexistence with humans, who are Flame and Aqua. Having determined humanity as enemies, Lightning declares war on humanity and the Ignis who chose coexistence. As Windy is heavily damaged by the virus, Lightning and his group retreats with Playmaker and Soulburner chasing after them. Varis leaks the location to SOL Technologies, where they send the bounty hunters to intercept the Ignis. To stop their pursuers, Lightning separates Playmaker and Soulburner. While Playmaker faces Bohman once more, Soulburner chases after Jin and Lightning. Bohman reveals that he is an AI created by Lightning to become the leader, who will unite the Ignis and take them to the next step of evolution.
72	26	"Strategy Shift" / Clear Perfection; Transliteration: "Kumori-naki Kyokuchi" (Japanese: 曇りなき極致)	Shin Yoshida	October 10, 2018	April 12, 2020
73	27	"Weathering the Storm" / Light Blade that Slices Despair; Transliteration: "Zetsubō o Tatsu Kōjin" (Japanese: 絶望を絶つ光刃)	Shin Yoshida	October 17, 2018	April 19, 2020
74	28	"Brain Hack" / Captured Ignis; Transliteration: "Toraware no Igunisu" (Japanese: 囚われのイグニス)	Masaaki Tachihara	October 24, 2018	April 26, 2020
75	29	"Earthfall" / The Demon Possessing His Heart; Transliteration: "Kokoro ni Toritsuku Oni" (Japanese: 心に取と付く鬼)	Masaaki Tachihara	October 31, 2018	May 3, 2020
76	30	"Awakened Memories" / Memories Brought Back; Transliteration: "Yobi-okosareru Kioku" (Japanese: 呼び起される記憶)	Atsushi Maekawa	November 7, 2018	May 10, 2020
77	31	"A Family Reunion" / Siblings in Conflict; Transliteration: "Ai'irenai Keimai" (Japanese: 相容れない兄妹)	Atsushi Maekawa	November 14, 2018	May 17, 2020
78	32	"From One Hunter To Another" / Rebellious Bounty Hunter; Transliteration: "Hankotsu no Bauntī Hantā" (Japanese: 反骨のバウンティハンター)	Junki Takegami	November 21, 2018	May 24, 2020
79	33	"The Hunt Is On" / Speed of Light - Lightning; Transliteration: "Kōsoku no Raitoningu" (Japanese: 光速のライトニング)	Junki Takegami	November 28, 2018	May 31, 2020
80	34	"Lightning Strikes" / Bounty Hunter's Duty; Transliteration: "Bauntī Hantā no Tsutome" (Japanese: 賞金稼ぎの務め)	Junki Takegami	December 5, 2018	June 7, 2020
81	35	"Heart of Darkness" / Arrived at the Summit; Transliteration: "Tadori-tsuita Itadaki" (Japanese: たどり着いた頂)	Mitsutaka Hirota	December 12, 2018	June 14, 2020
82	36	"Gored" / What's Beyond Instincts; Transliteration: "Honnō no Saki ni Aru Mono" (Japanese: 本能の先にあるもの)	Mitsutaka Hirota	December 19, 2018	June 21, 2020
83	37	"Reaching Out" / Irregular Meeting; Transliteration: "Iregyurā Mītingu" (Japanese: イレギュラー・ミーティング)	Shin Yoshida, Masaaki Tachihara	December 26, 2018	September 6, 2020
84	38	"Payback" / Past That Cannot Be Quieted; Transliteration: "Shizumaranai Kako" (Japanese: 静まらない過去)	Shin Yoshida	January 9, 2019	September 13, 2020
85	39	"My Brother's Keeper" / True Tears; Transliteration: "Itsuwari-naki Namida" (Japanese: 偽りなき涙)	Masaaki Tachihara	January 16, 2019	September 20, 2020
86	40	"The Weakest Link" / Wisdom of the Deprived; Transliteration: "Motazaru-mono no Chie" (Japanese: 持たざる者の知恵)	Shin Yoshida	January 23, 2019	September 27, 2020
87	41	"The Ultimate Connection" / Chain Destruction; Transliteration: "Rensa Hakai" (Japanese: 連鎖破壊)	Shin Yoshida	January 30, 2019	October 4, 2020
88	42	"A Breezy Battle" / Windy the Revenger; Transliteration: "Ribenjā Uindi" (Japanese: リベンジャー・ウインディ)	Mitsutaka Hirota	February 6, 2019	October 11, 2020
89	43	"Fan the Flames" / The Uniting Two Flames; Transliteration: "Kasanaru Futatsu no Hi" (Japanese: 重なる二つの火)	Mitsutaka Hirota	February 13, 2019	October 18, 2020
90	44	"For A Friend" / Creator of the Next Generation; Transliteration: "Jisedai no Sōzōshu" (Japanese: 次世代の創造主)	Atsushi Maekawa	February 20, 2019	October 25, 2020
91	45	"From The Heart" / Proud Maiden; Transliteration: "Hokori-takaki Otome" (Japanese: 誇り高き乙女)	Atsushi Maekawa	February 27, 2019	November 1, 2020
92	46	"Friend And Foe" / Big Test; Transliteration: "Ōinaru Shiren" (Japanese: 大いなる試練)	Junki Takegami	March 6, 2019	November 8, 2020
93	47	"Fighting Promise" / Promise to Each Other; Transliteration: "Kawashita Yakusoku" (Japanese: 交わした約束)	Junki Takegami	March 13, 2019	November 15, 2020
94	48	"No Matter What It Takes" / Raging Soul; Transliteration: "Takeru Tamashī" (Japanese: 猛る魂)	Atsushi Maekawa	March 20, 2019	November 22, 2020
95	49	"From the Ashes" / Radiance of the Phoenix; Transliteration: "Fushichō no Kagayaki" (Japanese: 不死鳥の輝き)	Atsushi Maekawa	March 27, 2019	November 29, 2020
96	50	"I Know Your Secret" / Lightning's Crime; Transliteration: "Raitoningu no Tsumi" (Japanese: ライトニングの罪)	Shin Yoshida	April 3, 2019	December 6, 2020
97	51	"Outsmart, Outwit, Outthink!" / Ignis Unification Plan; Transliteration: "Igunisu Tōgō Keikaku" (Japanese: イグニス統合計画)	Shin Yoshida	April 10, 2019	December 13, 2020
98	52	"Lightning Storm" / The AI Crosses the Line; Transliteration: "Issen o Koeta Ēai" (Japanese: 一線を越えたAI)	Shin Yoshida	April 17, 2019	December 20, 2020
99	53	"Bohman's End Game" / Door to the New World; Transliteration: "Shinsekai no Tobira" (Japanese: 新世界の扉)	Mitsutaka Hirota	April 24, 2019	December 27, 2020
100	54	"I Know Everything" / Twisted Utopia; Transliteration: "Nejireta Risōkyō" (Japanese: ねじれた理想郷)	Mitsutaka Hirota	May 1, 2019	January 3, 2021
101	55	"Ai of the Beholder" / Unwavering Instinct; Transliteration: "Mayoi-naki Honnō" (Japanese: 迷いなき本能)	Mitsutaka Hirota	May 8, 2019	January 10, 2021
102	56	"The Final Turn" / Entrusted Wishes; Transliteration: "Yudanerareta Negai" (Japanese: 委ねられた願い)	Shin Yoshida	May 15, 2019	January 17, 2021
103	57	"Reflections" / "Journey to the End"; Transliteration: "Owari e no Tabidachi" (Japanese: 終わりへの旅立ち)	Masaaki Tachihara	May 22, 2019	January 24, 2021
After being defeated by Playmaker, Bohman returns the conscioisnesses of those that were defeated. However, the Ignises, including Ai, are still missing. Yusaku and Theodore discuss this and reflect on the events that occurred since the launch of Link VRAINS 2.0. In Link VRAINS, a man and a boy look over five graves with each headstone showing the symbol of the five Ignises that were absorbed by Bohman.
