= Daydreaming/Choose Me =

Single by Band-Maid

from the album World Domination
- B-side: "Play"
- Released: July 19, 2017
- Genre: Rock
- Label: Crown Stones
- Songwriters: Miku Kobato; Band-Maid
- Producer: Tienowa

Band-Maid singles chronology
"YOLO" (2016)	"Daydreaming/Choose Me" (2017)	"Start Over" (2018)

Music videos
- Band-Maid "Daydreaming" on YouTube
- Band-Maid "Choose Me" on YouTube

"Daydreaming/Choose Me" is the third single by Japanese rock band Band-Maid, released in Japan on July 19, 2017, by Crown Stones. Band-Maid made a cameo appearance in the 2021 Netflix film Kate, playing "Choose Me". "Choose Me" was used in the third episode Better Goff Dead of the 2022 TV series Peacemaker.

== Composition and lyrics ==
Lead guitarist Kanami Tōno composed "Daydreaming" after lead vocalist Saiki Atsumi requested a ballad. She was told to incorporate elements of tropical house and EDM and make it more like Band-Maid. Tōno wrote it on piano. It took about a month to arrange the music. Atsumi told rhythm guitarist/vocalist Miku Kobato, she wanted a song where the audience could take a break and she could sing calmly. Atsumi told Tōno she wanted a rock version of a Hikaru Utada song and she asked her not to include too many English words.

"Choose Me" was written simultaneously with "Daydreaming". When Kobato asked Atsumi what kind of image she wanted for the chorus, after listening to the demo Tōno sent her, she said the appropriate words in the tentative lyrics sounded like "love is". Kobato was surprised, because previously, Atsumi did not want to sing about love.

"Play" was originally an instrumental. Tōno was asked to make a song that would be popular at festivals. Kobato made the lyrics with a strong sense of a scene where everyone is having a good time.

== Background and release ==
The single was released in two versions: a standard edition, and a limited edition, which contains the CD and a DVD. Both editions of the single feature the b-side "Play". "Daydreaming" and "Play" were later released on their fifth studio album World Domination.

== Critical reception ==
Patrick St. Michel of Special Broadcasting Service called "Daydreaming" "...borderline cinematic" and that "...the song delivers". He called "Choose Me" "...pure frantic rush; the group barrels ahead, punctuated by the speedy vocals, which add a sense of urgency to the music."

== Music video ==
The music video for "Daydreaming" was released on May 26, 2017, while the music video for "Choose Me" was released on June 26, 2017. The music video for "Daydreaming", was shot in Taiwan. The music video for "Choose Me" shows Band-Maid playing in an empty room.

== Live performances ==
The footage for the DVD in the limited edition was filmed at Akasaka Blitz in Tokyo on January 9, 2017. Live versions of "Choose Me" and "Play" were later released on their video albums Start Over, Band-Maid World Domination Tour [Shinka] at Line Cube Shibuya (Shibuya Public Hall) and Band-Maid Online Okyu-Ji (Feb. 11, 2021), while live versions of "Daydreaming" were released on the former two video albums.

In June 2018, Band-Maid played "Choose Me" in TV Azteca's morning show Venga la alegría in Mexico.

== Track listing ==
CD

All music is composed by Band-Maid.

No.	Title	Lyrics	Length
1.	"Daydreaming"	Miku Kobato; Saiki Atsumi	3:57
2.	"Choose Me"	Kobato	3:41
3.	"Play"	Kobato	3:19

DVD (Limited edition)

No.	Title	Lyrics	Music	Length
1.	"Real Existence"	Miwa Sasaki	Koji Goto (ck 510)
2.	"Before Yesterday"	Nakamura	Hitoshi Okamoto
3.	"Take Me Higher!!"	Kobato; Atsumi	Band-Maid
4.	"The Non-Fiction Days"	Kanata Nakamura	Toshinari Ohnishi
5.	"Don't You Tell Me"	Kobato; Atsumi	Band-Maid
6.	"Alone"	Kobato; Atsumi	Band-Maid
7.	"YOLO"	Kobato	Band-Maid

== Credits and personnel ==
Band-Maid members

- Misa – bass
- Miku Kobato – vocals, guitar
- Saiki Atsumi – vocals
- Akane Hirose – drums
- Kanami Tōno – guitar

Recording and management

- Recorded at Nasoundra Palace Studio
- Recording engineer: Masyoshi Yamamoto
- Mixed at Mix Forest
- Mix Engineer: Masahiko Fukui
- Mastered by Masahiko Fukui
- Art Direction: Hikaru Kawahara
- Photograph: Takayuki Okada

== Charts ==
Chart (2017)	Peak position
Japan (Oricon)	20
Japan Top Singles Sales (Billboard)	18

== Release history ==
Region	Date	Format	Label	Edition(s)
Japan	July 19, 2017	CD; digital download	Crown Tokuma	Standard edition
Japan	July 19, 2017	CD with DVD	Crown Tokuma	Limited edition
Worldwide	July 19, 2017	Digital download	Crown Tokuma	Standard edition
