= Conqueror (Band-Maid album) =

- "Normal" cover featuring guitarist/singer Miku Kobato

Studio album by Band-Maid
- Released: December 4, 2019
- Recorded: 2018–2019
- Genres: Hard rock; heavy metal
- Length: 55:27
- Languages: Japanese; English
- Labels: Revolver (Japan); JPU (International)
- Producer: Band-Maid

Band-Maid chronology
Band-Maiko (2019)	Conqueror (2019)	Unseen World (2021)

Singles from Conqueror
- 1. "Glory" Released: January 16, 2019; 2. "Bubble" Released: January 16, 2019

Alternative cover
- "Type B" cover featuring singer Saiki Atsumi

Music videos
- "Glory" on YouTube
- "Endless Story" on YouTube
- "Bubble" on YouTube
- "The Dragon Cries" on YouTube
- "Blooming" on YouTube
- "Reincarnation" on YouTube

Conqueror is the sixth studio album by the Japanese all-female rock band Band-Maid. It was released digitally on December 4, 2019, with physical formats released one week later. It debuted at number nine on the Oricon Albums Chart and debuted at number one on the Oricon weekly Rock Album ranking. The album was preceded by the singles "Glory" and "Bubble", both released in January 2019. The international version from JPU Records includes English lyric translations and Romaji lyric transliterations.

"Glory" was used as the second ending theme for the second season of the anime series Yu-Gi-Oh! VRAINS. "Bubble" was used as the theme song for the Japanese drama series Perfect Crime. The song "Blooming" was used in the Netflix action thriller film Kate.

== Background and recording ==
Production for the album started around August 2018. The album includes a lot of mid-tempo songs, because they felt that their fans were exhausted from their live shows and that they needed to rest. The working title was Future Conqueror.

== Composition and lyrics ==
The drums for "Page" are a mix of live and electronic sounds. Lead guitarist Kanami Tōno wrote it with the image of a song that would be played at weddings. The lyrics are about cosmetics. "Glory" was inspired by the anime Yu-Gi-Oh! VRAINS and describes a world where AI and humans coexist. Rhythm guitarist/vocalist Miku Kobato stated that the English lyrics in the song were made intentionally easy to sing, as they found that many kids watched the show.

"Endless Story" was the first song written for the album. It was written with the image of being played at Yokohama Arena. "At the Drop of a Hat" was written the day the Reiwa era was announced. The original title was "Reiwa". The drums are a mix of live and electronic sounds Tōno wrote the music for "Azure" after she learned of the passing of manga artist Momoko Sakura.

"Dilemma" was the last song written for the album, as they felt they needed one more intense song. The B-side "Screaming" was originally going to be included on the album, but they opted to record a new song instead. It was written and recorded two weeks prior to the release of the album.

"Bubble" was inspired by the manga Perfect Crime. Kobato wrote the lyrics to be "good enough so that those who read the original would appreciate it". They were originally going to use one of their unreleased songs for the show, but Tōno "realized that the demo I just happened to be working on at the time was a better fit for the drama."

During the recording of the album, Band-Maid was contacted by producer Tony Visconti, who had learned about the band from songwriter Tom Kenney. Visconti invited band members Saiki Atsumi and Kobato to travel to a studio in New York City, where he produced the vocal tracks for the song "The Dragon Cries". Tōno sent Visconti a demo of the song's musical backing, expecting him to want to rework it, but he declared that it needed no alterations.

"Flying High" was mixed to sound similar to "The Dragon Cries". All of the members wrote a part of the chorus of "Blooming". Bassist Misa wrote the intro. "Rinne" was originally going to be included on their previous album, World Domination, but they decided it was not quite right. They stated it initially sounded closer to "Blooming", that it was not as dark and that the BPM was 190.

== Critical reception ==
Professional ratings
Review scores
Source	Rating
TuttoRock	7.5/10

Outright Geekery gave the album five out five stars, stating that it is Band-Maid's best album to date, and concluding that "This is an album with versatility, passion, and killer hit after killer hit." JRock News also praised the album, noting growth in the band's lyrics, variety in the songwriting, and a duality between the harder and softer aspects of the band's sound.

=== Accolades ===
Publication	Accolade	Rank
Con Safos Magazine	Best Albums of 2019	25
Unijolt	Top 10 Albums of 2019	9
Wall of Sound	Simon Valentine's Top 5 Albums of 2019	4
YesAsia	Best Japanese Albums of 2019	–

== Commercial performance ==
Conqueror debuted at number nine on the Oricon Albums Chart, selling 11,195 copies in its first week. The album debuted at number 19 on the Billboard Heatseekers chart, selling 560 copies in its first week.

== Track listing ==
All lyrics written by Miku Kobato, except track 11 by Tom Kenney; all music written and arranged by Band-Maid; all music produced by Band-Maid, except track 11 by Tony Visconti.

No.	Title	Length
1.	"Page"	4:17
2.	"Glory"	3:39
3.	"Liberal"	3:14
4.	"Endless Story"	3:44
5.	"Mirage"	3:57
6.	"At the Drop of a Hat"	4:19
7.	"Wonderland"	3:55
8.	"Azure"	2:49
9.	"Dilemma"	3:36
10.	"Bubble"	3:46
11.	"The Dragon Cries"	3:55
12.	"Flying High"	3:42
13.	"Catharsis" (カタルシス)	3:18
14.	"Blooming"	3:49
15.	"Reincarnation" (Rinne, 輪廻)	3:27
Total length:		55:27

=== DVD/Blu-ray (Limited Edition) ===
No.	Title	Length
1.	"Domination" (Instrumental video)
2.	"Dice" (Instrumental video)
3.	"Onset" (Instrumental video)

== Personnel ==
- Saiki Atsumi – lead vocals
- Miku Kobato – rhythm guitar, vocals
- Kanami Tōno – lead guitar
- Misa – bass
- Akane Hirose – drums

== Charts ==
Chart performance for Conqueror
Chart (2019)	Peak position
Japan Top Album Sales (Billboard)	9
Japanese Albums (Oricon)	9
Japanese Rock Albums (Oricon)	1
UK Independent Albums (OCC)	29
UK Independent Breakers Albums (OCC)	4
UK Rock & Metal Albums (OCC)	11
US Heatseekers Albums (Billboard)	19
US Top Hard Rock Albums (Billboard)	25
US World Albums (Billboard)	11
