= Glory (Band-Maid song) =

Single by Band-Maid

from the album Conqueror
- B-side: "Hide-and-Seek"
- Released: January 16, 2019
- Length: 6:16
- Label: Crown Stones
- Songwriters: Miku Kobato; Band-Maid

Band-Maid singles chronology
"Start Over" (2018)	"Glory" (2019)	"Bubble" (2019)

Music video
- Band-Maid "Glory" on YouTube

"Glory" is the fifth single by Japanese rock band Band-Maid, released in Japan on January 16, 2019, by Crown Stones. The song was used as the second ending theme for the second season of the anime Yu-Gi-Oh! VRAINS. It was released on the same day as "Bubble".

== Composition and lyrics ==
The lyrics for "Glory" were inspired by the anime Yu-Gi-Oh! VRAINS and describes a world where AIs and human coexist. Rhythm guitarist/vocalist Miku Kobato stated that the English lyrics in the song were made intentionally easy to sing, as they found that many kids watched the show.

The lyrics for "Hide-and-Seek" revolve around a darker version of hide-and-seek, where the outcome is life or death. It was based on a demo that lead guitarist Kanami Tōno had written and set aside for later use.

== Critical reception ==
JaME said that the title track "... accelerates right from the start with its igniting opening riff, maintaining the speed over the course of the song with excellent drumming and 'bouncing' choruses." And that "Hide and Seek" "... will definitely fire up the crowd during gigs with its speed".

== Music video ==
The music video for "Glory" was released on November 2, 2018.

== Live performances ==
Live versions of "Glory" were later released on their video albums Band-Maid World Domination Tour [Shinka] at Line Cube Shibuya (Shibuya Public Hall) and Band-Maid Online Okyu-Ji (Feb. 11, 2021).

== Track listing ==
CD

All lyrics are written by Miku Kobato; all music is composed by Band-Maid.

No.	Title	Length
1.	"Glory"	3:15
2.	"Hide-and-Seek"	3:01

== Credits and personnel ==
Band-Maid members

- Misa – bass
- Miku Kobato – vocals, guitar
- Saiki Atsumi – vocals
- Akane Hirose – drums
- Kanami Tōno – guitar

Recording and management

- Recorded at Nasoundra Palace Studio
- Recording engineer: Masyoshi Yamamoto
- Mixed at Mix Forest
- Mix engineer: Masahiko Fukui
- Mastered by Masahiko Fukui
- Design by Akira Yamaguchi, Kazu Yamamoto, Misaki Fujioka

== Charts ==
Chart (2019)	Peak position
Japan (Oricon)	12
Japan (Billboard)	70
Japan Top Singles Sales (Billboard)	11

== Release history ==
Region	Date	Format	Label	Edition(s)
Japan	January 16, 2019	CD; digital download	Crown Tokuma	Standard edition
Japan	January 16, 2019	2xCD	Crown Tokuma	Limited edition
Japan	January 16, 2019	CD	Crown Tokuma	Limited edition
Worldwide	January 16, 2019	Standard edition	Crown Tokuma	Digital download
