= YOLO (Band-Maid song) =

- Standard edition cover

Single by Band-Maid

from the album Just Bring It
- B-side: "Unfair Game"; "Matchless Gum"
- Released: November 16, 2016
- Length: 15:32
- Label: Crown Stones
- Songwriters: Miku Kobato; Band-Maid ("YOLO", "Unfair Game"); Miku Kobato; Saiki; Band-Maid ("Matchless Gum")

Band-Maid singles chronology
"Ai to Jōnetsu no Matador" (2014)	"YOLO" (2016)	"Daydreaming/Choose Me" (2017)

Music video
- Band-Maid "YOLO" on YouTube

Alternative cover
- Limited edition cover

"YOLO" is the second single by Japanese rock band Band-Maid. Released in Japan on November 16, 2016, by Crown Stones, it is the band's first single on a major record label. The title track is featured as the theme song of the video game Valiant Knights.

== Composition ==
In 2019, as Band-Maiko, they released an alternate version of "YOLO" (retitled "YOLOSIOSU"), with traditional Japanese instruments and lyrics rewritten in the Kyoto dialect.

== Background and release ==
The single was released in two versions: a standard edition, and a limited edition, which contains the CD and a music sheet for the song "YOLO", enclosed in a sleeve. Both editions of the single feature the b-sides "Unfair Game" and "Matchless Gum", along with an instrumental version of the title track. The artworks were designed with the motif of the headbands that Saiki (Limited Edition) and Miku Kobato (Regular Edition) wear usually on the stage.

== Critical reception ==
Trent Cannon of Rice Digital called the title track "High energy and forceful" and that it "...features an incredible guitar riff that really highlights Tono’s skills as well as the harmonies between Atsumi and Kobato’s voices."

== Music video ==
The music video for the title track was released on October 1, 2016.

== Live performances ==
"YOLO" was debuted at the "Brand New Maid Release Tour Final" show at Tsutaya O-West on October 1, 2016. "Matchless Gum" was debuted at the "Brand New Maid Release Tour Final additional service" at Shimokitazawa Garden on October 23, 2016. "Unfair Game" was debuted at the "YOLO Release Out-store mini-service" at Club Vijon on December 7, 2016.

To promote the release of the single, the band performed "YOLO" on December 3, 2016, at Tower Records, Shibuya as a part of the "Tower Records Maid 'YOLO' Release Memorial ~ Mini Service ~ event". The band also played "YOLO" and "Unfair Game" at the "1st Full Album" Just Bring It "Pre-Release One-man ~ New Year's First Serving Start ~" at Akasaka Blitz in Tokyo. Footage of "YOLO" taken from this concert was released in a bonus DVD for the limited edition of their third single "Daydreaming/Choose Me".

== Track listing ==
All music is composed by Band-Maid.

No.	Title	Lyrics	Length
1.	"YOLO"	Miku Kobato	4:26
2.	"Unfair Game"	Miku Kobato	3:30
3.	"Matchless Gum"	Miku Kobato; Saiki	3:11
4.	"YOLO (Instrumental)"		4:25
Total length:			15:32

== Credits and personnel ==
Band-Maid members

- Misa – bass
- Miku Kobato – vocals, guitar
- Saiki Atsumi – vocals
- Akane Hirose – drums
- Kanami Tōno – guitar

Recording and management

- Recorded at Nasoundra Palace Studio
- Recording Engineer: Masyoshi Yamamoto
- Mixed at Mix Forest
- Mix Engineer: Masahiko Fukui
- Mastered by Shigeo "MT" Miyamoto (form The Master)
- Art Direction: Masashi Nakazato (Number NC)
- Photograph: Riu Nakamura
- Stylist: Mayako Shigeta

Credits adapted from "YOLO" single liner notes.

== Charts ==
Chart (2016)	Peak position
Japan (Oricon)	36
Japan Top Singles Sales (Billboard)	42

== Release history ==
Region	Date	Format	Label	Edition(s)
Japan	November 16, 2016	CD; digital download	Crown Tokuma	Standard edition
Japan	November 16, 2016	CD with music sheet	Crown Tokuma	Limited edition
Worldwide	November 16, 2016	Digital download	Crown Tokuma	Standard edition
