= World Domination (Band-Maid album) =

Studio album by Band-Maid
- Released: February 14, 2018 (Japan)
- Studios: Nasoundra Palace, Tokyo, Japan
- Length: 53:56
- Language: Japanese
- Labels: Crown Stones (Japan); JPU (International)
- Producer: Band-Maid

Band-Maid chronology
Just Bring It (2017)	World Domination (2018)	Band-Maiko (2019)

Singles from World Domination
- 1. "Daydreaming" Released: July 19, 2017

Music videos
- "Domination" on YouTube
- "Daydreaming" on YouTube
- "Dice" on YouTube

World Domination is the fifth studio album by Japanese all-female rock band Band-Maid. It was released on February 14, 2018, and was supported with the World Domination Tour 2018. Music videos were made for the single "Daydreaming", the lead track "Domination" and the last track "Dice". The album debuted at number nine on the Japanese Oricon Albums Chart, selling 8,140 copies in its first week.

The international version of the album from JPU Records includes English lyric translations, Romaji transliterations and bonus track "Honey". The song "Carry On Living" was used on the anime Quiz Tokiko-san.

== Composition and lyrics ==
"I Can't Live Without You." and "Dice" were both considered to be released as the lead song, but ultimately "Domination" was chosen instead. The working title for "Domination" was "World Domination" which was then used as the album title. Lead vocalist Saiki Atsumi, told lead guitarist Kanami Tōno, to write a song based on the image of world domination. Tōno was inspired by Street Fighter II.

"Play" was originally an instrumental. Tōno was asked to make a song that would be popular at festivals. Kobato made the lyrics with a strong sense of a scene where everyone is having a good time. It was previously released on the Daydreaming/Choose Me single.

"One and Only" was the first song written for the album. The lyrics for "Carry On Living" were inspired by the Japanese film March Comes in Like a Lion. The lyrics for "Alive-or-Dead" are about cryptocurrency.

Tōno composed "Daydreaming", after Atsumi requested a ballad. She was told to incorporate elements of tropical house and EDM and make it more like Band-Maid. Tōno wrote it on piano. It took about a month to arrange the music. Atsumi told rhythm guitarist/vocalist Miku Kobato, she wanted a song where the audience could take a break and she could sing calmly. Atsumi told Tōno she wanted a rock version of a Hikaru Utada song and she asked her not to include too many English words.

== Track listing ==
All lyrics are written by Miku Kobato, except where indicated.

No.	Title	Lyrics	Music	Arrangement	Length
1.	"I Can't Live Without You."		Band-Maid	Band-Maid	3:49
2.	"Play"		Band-Maid	Band-Maid	3:19
3.	"One and Only"		Band-Maid	Band-Maid	3:22
4.	"Domination"		Band-Maid	Band-Maid	3:51
5.	"Fate"		Kentaro Akutsu; Band-Maid	Akutsu; Band-Maid	4:31
6.	"Spirit!!"		Band-Maid	Band-Maid	3:41
7.	"Rock in Me"		Tienowa; Band-Maid	Tienowa; Band-Maid	3:21
8.	"Clang"		Band-Maid	Band-Maid	4:10
9.	"Turn Me On"		Akutsu; Band-Maid	Akutsu; Band-Maid	4:15
10.	"Carry On Living"		Band-Maid	Band-Maid	3:32
11.	"Daydreaming"	Miku Kobato; Saiki Atsumi	Band-Maid	Band-Maid	3:57
12.	"Anemone"		Band-Maid	Band-Maid	4:22
13.	"Alive-or-Dead"		Band-Maid	Band-Maid	3:44
14.	"Dice"		Band-Maid	Band-Maid	4:02
Total length:					53:56

Standard edition bonus track
No.	Title	Lyrics	Music	Length
15.	"Honey" (ハニー) (Mucc cover)	Miya	Miya	3:24
Total length:				57:20

=== Limited edition (with Blu-ray or DVD) ===
Limited Edition w/ Blu-ray or DVD featuring the Tour Final recorded live at Studio Coast on November 24, 2017.

No.	Title	Length
1.	"Choose Me"
2.	"Don't You Tell Me"
3.	"モラトリアム"
4.	"Puzzle"
5.	"Cross"
6.	"Matchless Gum"
7.	"Awkward"
8.	"Daydreaming"
9.	"YOLO"
10.	"Alone"
11.	"Real Existence"
12.	"Take Me Higher!"
13.	"Play"
14.	"Secret My Lips"
15.	"The Non-Fiction Days"

== Personnel ==
Band-Maid

- Saiki Atsumi – lead vocals (except track 7)
- Miku Kobato – rhythm guitar, vocals, lead vocals on track 7
- Kanami Tōno – lead guitar
- Misa – bass
- Akane Hirose – drums

Production

- Band-Maid – sound producer
- Tienowa – sound design (except tracks 5 and 9)
- Kentaro Akutsu – sound design and vocal director on tracks 5 and 9
- Ayako Nakanomori – vocal director (except tracks 5 and 9)
- Masahiko Fukui – mixing and Mastering at Mix Forest, Tokyo
- Masayoshi Yamamoto – recording engineer
- Satoshi Kohno – art direction
- Satoshi Kuno – art producer

== Charts ==
Chart (2018)	Peak position
Japan Top Albums (Billboard)	7
Japanese Albums (Oricon)	9

== External listing ==
- World Domination Listing at JPU Records (in English)
