= Just Bring It (album) =

Studio album by Band-Maid
- Released: January 11, 2017 (Japan)
- Recorded: 2016
- Studio: Studio Birdman West; Nasoundra Palace Studio; Sunshine Studio; Scrambles Studio; Studio Fine, Tokyo; Thomas Studio, Kyoto, Japan
- Length: 49:55
- Language: Japanese
- Label: Crown Stones (Japan); JPU (International)
- Producer: Junji Hayashi; Yasutaka Wada; Koji Goto

Band-Maid chronology
Brand New Maid (2016)	Just Bring It (2017)	World Domination (2018)

Singles from Just Bring It
- 1. "YOLO" Released: November 16, 2016

Music videos
- "Don't You Tell Me" on YouTube
- "YOLO" on YouTube
- "Secret My Lips" on YouTube

Just Bring It is the fourth studio album and first full-length album by Japanese band Band-Maid, released on January 11, 2017 in Japan via Crown Stones and February 10, 2017 internationally by JPU Records. The record was preceded by the quintet's first world tour and the single "YOLO", released in November 2016. The album reached number 16 on the Japanese Oricon Albums Chart, selling 4,015 copies in its first week.

The last track "Secret My Lips" was rearranged in the Japanese traditional style with Kyoto dialect lyrics, and the music video was released as "Secret Maiko Lips" for 2018 April Fools' Day.

The international release from JPU Records includes English lyric translations and Romaji lyric transliterations.

== Background ==
After the release of mini-album New Beginning in 2015, the group were signed to major Japanese record label Crown Stones, as well as sealing international distribution through JPU Records for the first time. The group played their first UK show at MCM London Comic Con in May 2016, ahead of the release of Brand New Maid. After completing the recording of their first full-length album, the band embarked on their first world tour, including stops in the UK, before releasing single "YOLO" in November, along with a music video. The second music video, "Don't You Tell Me", was released on 9 January to coincide with the release of the album in Japan.

== Composition and lyrics ==
The lyrics for "Puzzle" are about wanting to be near to your lover even though you shouldn't. Tōno wrote "YOLO" before Band-Maid when she was a singer-songwriter, but arranged it to fit the style of the band. "OOPARTs" was included because they wanted to have a song that was closer to the pop rock that they originally played. Tōno wrote "Take Me Higher!!" to be a classic rock sounding song.

Lead guitarist Kanami Tōno wanted to make "Moratorium" more technical, but rhythm guitarist/vocalist Miku Kobato wanted her to make it more of a song that everyone could sing along to. Tōno wrote the instruments first and added the vocal melody after. Tōno wrote the guitar riff by humming it, but when she attempted to play it she found it difficult so she practiced it a lot. The male staff contributed to the backing vocals.

"Awkward" was the first song written for the album. Tōno and bassist Misa cowrote it. The lyrics depict a woman who has lost her love, but is determined to look forward and move on. "Decided by Myself" was the last song written for the album. Tōno wrote it with the image of an ending theme to an anime. They originally considered using "Secret My Lips" as the opening song, but ultimately, "Don’t You Tell Me" was chosen instead.

== Critical reception ==
Professional ratings
Review scores
Source	Rating
RockSins	9/10
Rock Sound	7/10

Reviews for Just Bring It were favorable. Phillip Whitehead of the webzine RockSins praised the album's diversity and improved musicianship, giving the album 9/10. Rob Sayce of the British magazine Rock Sound praised the album's catchiness and choruses.

== Track listing ==
All credits adapted from the original releases.

No.	Title	Lyrics	Music	Arrangement	Length
1.	"Don't You Tell Me"	Miku Kobato; Saiki Atsumi	Band-Maid	Band-Maid	3:10
2.	"Puzzle"	Kobato	Band-Maid	Band-Maid; Tienowa	4:19
3.	"Moratorium" (モラトリアム)	Kobato	Band-Maid	Band-Maid	4:15
4.	"YOLO"	Kobato	Band-Maid	Band-Maid	4:25
5.	"Cross"	Nora; Kobato	Nora	Miraisonic	3:45
6.	"OOPArts"	Endcape	Nora	Spinstealthspike	4:06
7.	"Take Me Higher!!"	Kobato; Atsumi	Band-Maid	Band-Maid; Tienowa	3:18
8.	"So, What?"	Miwa Sasaki	Koji Goto (ck510)	Goto	3:48
9.	"Time"	Kobato	Hitoshi Okamoto	Okamoto	3:29
10.	"You."	Kobato	Band-Maid	Toshinari Ohnishi	3:43
11.	"Awkward"	Kobato	Band-Maid	Band-Maid	3:32
12.	"Decided by Myself"	Kobato; Atsumi	Band-Maid	Band-Maid	3:54
13.	"Secret My Lips"	Kobato	Band-Maid	Band-Maid	4:11
Total length:					49:55

== Personnel ==
Band-Maid

- Saiki Atsumi – lead vocals (except track 9)
- Miku Kobato – rhythm guitar, vocals, lead vocals on track 9
- Kanami Tōno – lead guitar
- Misa – bass
- Akane Hirose – drums

== Charts ==
Chart (2017)	Peak position
Japan Top Albums (Billboard)	20
Japanese Albums (Oricon)	16
UK Independent Albums (OCC)	49
UK Independent Breakers Albums (OCC)	13
UK Rock & Metal Albums (OCC)	17
