= Yu-Gi-Oh! VRAINS =

Anime series produced by Gallop

- 遊☆戯☆王VRAINS
- Based on: Yu-Gi-Oh! by Kazuki Takahashi and Studio Dice
- Developed by: Shin Yoshida; Masahiro Hikokubo (Duel Composition)
- Directed by: Masahiro Hosoda (#1–13); Katsuya Asano (#14–120)
- Music by: Shinkichi Mitsumune
- Country of origin: Japan
- Original language: Japanese
- No. of episodes: 120 (list of episodes)

Production
- Producers: Kosuke Kazuno (TV Tokyo); Teruaki Jitsumatsu
- Animator: Gallop
- Production companies: TV Tokyo; NAS

Original release
- Network: TXN (TV Tokyo), BS TV Tokyo
- Release: May 10, 2017 – September 25, 2019

Related
- Other series
- List of all Yu-Gi-Oh! series; Yu-Gi-Oh! R
- Other media
- Video games; Trading card game

Yu-Gi-Oh! VRAINS (遊☆戯☆王VRAINS, Yū Gi Ō Vureinzu) is a Japanese anime series produced by TV Tokyo and NAS and animated by Gallop. It is the fifth anime spin-off in the Yu-Gi-Oh! franchise. The series aired in Japan on TV Tokyo from May 10, 2017, to September 25, 2019. It was simulcast outside of Asia by Crunchyroll courtesy of Konami Cross Media NY. It premiered in the United States on November 3, 2020, on Pluto TV. The term 'VRAINS' derives from 'Virtual Reality' (VR), 'Artificial Intelligence' (AI), 'Network System' (NS). The series revolves around the exploits of the protagonist Yusaku within the virtual world named VRAINS. In addition to featuring previous summoning mechanics, VRAINS introduces the new "Link Summon" mechanic.

The series was succeeded by Yu-Gi-Oh! Sevens, which premiered in Japan on April 4, 2020.

== Plot ==
In a place known as Den City, thousands of duelists take part in a virtual reality space known as LINK VRAINS, created by SOL Technologies, where users can create unique avatars and participate in games of Duel Monsters with each other. As a mysterious hacker organization known as the Knights of Hanoi, led by Varis, threatens this world, a high-school student and hacking genius named Yusaku Fujiki battles against them under the guise of Playmaker. Both the Knights and SOL Technologies are also after a peculiar self-aware artificial intelligence program, who holds the key to a secret area inside the network named the Cyberse World, which the Knights of Hanoi seek to destroy. As the series begins, Yusaku sees the chance to capture this AI, which he names Ai, who sets off a digital maelstrom in LINK VRAINS known as the Data Storm. As the appearance of this storm gives birth to Speed Duels, in which duellists surf the wind as they duel, Yusaku battles against Hanoi in order to uncover the truth concerning an incident that happened to him 10 years ago. With the help of two Charisma Duellists, Go Onizuka (Japanese) and Skye Zaizen, who uses the alias Blue Angel (season 1), and Blue Maiden (season 2 onwards) online, Playmaker is able to defeat Varis, saving the entire network and part ways with Ai who decides to return to his own world, the Cyberse World.

Three months after Hanoi's fall, Ai discovers the Cyberse World destroyed and his friends nowhere to be found, prompting him to return to Yusaku. Meanwhile, Yusaku once again fights as Playmaker after the consciousness of the younger brother of his friend, Cal Kolter, is stolen by a mysterious enemy named Bohman. In pursuit of Bohman, Yusaku and Ai are joined by Theodore Hamilton, a victim of the Lost Incident like Yusaku who uses the alias of Soulburner online and Ai's Fire Ignis friend based on Theodore, Flame. Aqua, the Water Ignis, follows soon after by becoming Skye's partner. At the same time, Varis revives Knights of Hanoi to fight against the new enemies. It's revealed that Bohman is a sentient AI created by the Light Ignis, Lightning, who reveals that he's the one who destroyed the Cyberse World and steals Cal's brother's consciousness. Deeming Ignis superior, he decides to destroy humanity. The Wind Ignis, Windy, also assists Lightning after his program was forcefully rewritten. To defeat Lightning's team, Yusaku and his friends join forces with Knights of Hanoi and enter Lightning's stronghold.

Both sides fight until only Playmaker, Ai, and Bohman are left with the latter having absorbed all other Ignis. Before perishing, both Flame and Aqua give Ai the last of their powers, allowing him and Playmaker to defeat Bohman.

After the fight against Bohman, LINK VRAINS is shut down and Ai disappear together with Yusaku's robot, Roboppi. Replacing LINK VRAINS, SOL Technology develops a humanoid robot SOLtis, which Ai and Roboppi uses to infiltrate SOL Technology and attack its high executive, Queen. Knowing he'll be the next target, Skye's older brother, Akira, enlists the help of Playmaker and his friends as well as Knights of Hanoi once more to protect him. Ai and Roboppi manage to defeat everyone except Playmaker, Soulburner, and Varis, who are forced to fight decoys. After defeating Akira and taking over SOL Technology, Ai reopens LINK VRAINS and delivers a message for Playmaker that tells the whereabout of his location. Yusaku confronts Ai alone, leading the two of them to duel. Ai explains that Lightning left behind a simulation that shows the world will be destroyed if Ai is the only Ignis left. Fearing that he'll become like Lightning and Bohman, Ai decides to end his life either by Playmaker's hand if he loses or by scattering his free will into the SOLtis if he wins. Despite Playmaker's attempt to dissuade Ai, he still refuses to back down, forcing Playmaker to defeat him. In his last moment, Ai reveals that within the simulations, Yusaku always ends up dying protecting him, which is a future that he wishes to avoid. Three months after the final battle, everyone moves on with their lives and Yusaku goes on a journey. Somewhere within the network, Ai is revealed to be alive.

== Production ==
Yu-Gi-Oh! VRAINS was first announced on December 16, 2016. It began airing on TV Tokyo in Japan on May 10, 2017. The series is being directed by Masahiro Hosoda at Studio Gallop with screenplay by Shin Yoshida and character design by Ken'ichi Hara. It would be the final anime series in the franchise to be animated by Gallop; Bridge would animate future instalments beginning with Yu-Gi-Oh! Sevens. The series ended on September 25, 2019.

The series is being simulcast with English subtitles outside of Asia by Crunchyroll. This makes it the first series in the Yu-Gi-Oh! franchise to receive an official simulcast alongside its Japanese broadcast.

A localized English adaptation was produced by Konami Cross Media NY. The pilot episode was previewed along with a digitally remastered screening of Yu-Gi-Oh! The Movie: Pyramid of Light on March 11, 2018, and March 12, 2018 in the US, and on June 13, 2018, in the UK. The English dub began airing on Teletoon in Canada on September 1, 2018, and on 9Go! in Australia on April 6, 2019.

In November 2020, Cinedigm announced that the streaming service Pluto TV has secured exclusive rights in multiple territories, including the United States and Latin America, to VRAINS. Pluto TV would launch a channel dedicated to the Yu-Gi-Oh! franchise, featuring episodes from the entire Yu-Gi-Oh! Duel Monsters metaseries, including VRAINS, available in English and dubbed in multiple languages.

== Trading Card Game ==
Yu-Gi-Oh! VRAINS introduces new gameplay elements to the Yu-Gi-Oh! Trading Card Game. With the release of the "Link Strike Starter Deck", it introduced the New Master Rules (also known as Master Rule 4 in some countries) to the competitive field of play. Now, only one monster can be summoned directly from each player's Extra Deck at a time, which is placed in one of the two new zones in the middle of the field called the "Extra Monster Zone". Complementing this new gameplay element are the new Link Monsters, honey-comb blue colored monsters that go into your Extra Deck. They do not have "Levels" or "Ranks", but instead have a "Link Rating", which indicates the number of arrows on the card and the required number of monsters required to summon them. A Link Monster's Link Rating can also be used as a number of materials for a Link Summon depending on their rating, subtracted from the Link Monster the player wishes to summon. Link Monsters have a number of Link Arrows equal to their Link Rating that point either vertically, horizontally, and/or diagonally. These Link Arrows that point to an empty Main Monster Zone allow the player to summon monsters from the Extra Deck, which include face-up Pendulum Monsters. The two Pendulum Zones have been moved to the far ends of the Spell & Trap Zones, though they also double as regular Spell & Trap Zones should the player wish not to use them.

In 2019, a new format exclusive to the TCG was introduced separate from the main game, known as Speed Duels. The rules are similar to the main game and parallel the formatting used in the mobile game Duel Links. A format meant as a beginner's introduction to the basics, both the field and each player's decks have been drastically simplified to reflect that. Decks contain only 20-30 cards, each player gets only three Main Monster zones, and a turn will immediately end following the Battle Phase. Exclusive to Speed Duels, each player is allowed one Skill Card, which a player places face down during the beginning of a duel and can use anytime.

== Reception ==
The series ranked 52 in Tokyo Anime Award Festival in Best 100 TV Anime 2017 category. The series' rank rose up to 8 in the same award in 2020 with 28,369 votes.
