= List of Ojarumaru episodes =

This is a list of episodes based on the Ojarumaru anime series. The series is produced by NHK Enterprises, animated by Studio Gallop, and directed by Akitaro Daichi. It has been airing on NHK Educational TV since October 5, 1998.

The series follows the adventures of a five-year-old Heian era prince named Ojarumaru Sakanoue who accidentally time-warps to modern day Japan and befriends a seven-year-old boy named Kazuma Tamura. After being allowed to live with the Tamura family, Ojarumaru tries to understand modern Japan's culture and makes many new friends, while avoiding the Oni Child Trio's efforts to retrieve a scepter he stole from Great King Enma.

== Episodes ==
=== Series 1 (1998–1999) ===
No.	Title	Original release date
1	"I am Ojarumaru"; Transliteration: "Maro ga Ojarumaru de ojaru" (Japanese: マロがおじゃる丸でおじゃる)	October 5, 1998
1,000 years ago in Fairy World in the Heian era, a bored Ojarumaru Sakanoue gets lured into Enma World and steals Great King Enma's scepter.
2	"The Little Brother Who Came From the Moon"; Transliteration: "Tsuki Kara Otouto Futtekita" (Japanese: 月からおとうとふってきた)	October 6, 1998
Ojarumaru goes through the Full Moon Road to the present day and meets a young boy named Kazuma Tamura and his grandfather Tommy. They escape from the Oni Child Trio, who were ordered by Great King Enma to get back his scepter from Ojarumaru.
3	"Everyone's Just Beginning"; Transliteration: "Minna Hajimete Bakari de ojaru" (Japanese: みんなはじめてばかりでおじゃる)	October 7, 1998
After Ojarumaru spends a night at Kazuma's house, his caretaker, Denbo the Densho-Firefly, comes over. Ojarumaru surprises Kazuma's parents at breakfast with his comments like an aristocrat. The Oni Child Trio, being disguised as deliverers, show up to get back Great King Enma's scepter.
4	"It's Good Going Slow"; Transliteration: "Yukkuri ga Yoi de ojaru" (Japanese: ユックリがよいでおじゃる)	October 8, 1998
Ojarumaru asks Kazuma to show him the town to look for the entrance to the Full Moon Road so he can get home. Riding on Kazuma's back, he asks him to take him to the Moonlight Tower. He gets dizzy when he sees the bus for the first time. When they get off the bus, the Oni Child Trio show up.
5	"Kazuma Likes Rocks Very Much"; Transliteration: "Kazuma wa Tottemo Ishi ga Suki" (Japanese: カズマはとっても石がすき)	October 9, 1998
Since Ojarumaru takes interest in various things in Moonlight Town, Kazuma takes him to his favorite spot where there are many of his favorite rocks. The Oni Child Trio watch Kazuma enthusiastically picking up rocks and they think he's collecting weapons to attack them. They also collect stuff and try to attack them.
6	"Grandpa Tommy's Big Discovery"; Transliteration: "Tomī-jī no Daihakken" (Japanese: トミー爺の大発見)	October 12, 1998
The Oni Child Trio left their battle sticks at Enma World. They go out to find new weapons and eventually find a giant fork, spoon, and knife. Later, they come to a historic site where Ojarumaru and Kazuma help Tommy's excavation. The Oni Child Trio attack, but Kisuke falls in a trap hall. Tommy helps Kisuke out of the hole and finds an oni's horn.
7	"My Cap is a Treasure Chest"; Transliteration: "Maro no Eboshi wa Takarabako" (Japanese: マロのエボシは宝ばこ)	October 13, 1998
The bus stop moves just in front of Kazuma's house. But a bus does not come up after a long wait. Someone moved the bus stop that was supposed to be in the middle of a shopping street. Kazuma puts it back and hurries to school. After school, Kazuma finds that the TV set and the fridge are missing. He notices the wires are going into Ojarumaru's tate-eboshi cap. It has fourth dimensional space inside and can contain anything.
8	"I Hate Baths and Water"; Transliteration: "Furo ya Mizu wa Iya de ojaru" (Japanese: 風呂や水はイヤでおじゃる)	October 14, 1998
Ojarumaru hates water, so he does not like baths either. Ai, Kazuma's mother, pushes him into the small bathroom. Then, the Oni Child Trio sneak there to find the scepter in Ojarumaru's clothes. The scepter is not in the prince's clothes. Then, they get into the bathroom and....!
9	"I'm Homesick"; Transliteration: "Hōmushikku de ojaru" (Japanese: ホームシックでおじゃる)	October 15, 1998
Denbo, the messenger, comes back from the Heian era and gives a report to Ojarumaru. The prince gets homesick. Ai makes pudding to cheer him up. Ojarumaru likes it and takes Kazuma's portion. Kazuma pleads his mother to make pudding again.
10	"My Cap is Mysterious"; Transliteration: "Maro no Eboshi wa Fushigi de ojaru" (Japanese: マロのエボシはふしぎでおじゃる)	October 16, 1998
The Oni Child Trio get into Kazuma's house to retrieve the scepter from Ojarumaru. Kisuke searches inside Ojarumaru's cap and is sucked into it. He finds the scepter there. But he falls in a trap before getting to it. He comes out right in front of the cat!
11	"Kin-chan is a Dinosaur Mania"; Transliteration: "Kin-chan wa Kyōryū Mania" (Japanese: 金ちゃんは恐竜マニア)	October 19, 1998
Kazuma introduces Kin-chan to Ojarumaru. Kin-chan is the son of a big apartment owner and Kazuma's classmate. He invites Ojarumaru and Kazuma to his room. It has many toys and dolls of dinosaurs. Then, the Oni Child Trio appear...
12	"Where's My Place?"; Transliteration: "Maro no Ibasho wa Doko de ojaru?" (Japanese: マロの居場所はどこでおじゃる？)	October 20, 1998
Ojarumaru is resting on his set of three pieces: a pedestal, a Byōbu, and an armrest in the toilet! He is dragged out of it by Kazuma and Makoto immediately. He tries to set his three-piece set, but Kazuma's house is not so spacious. Finally he rests on the top of Kazuma's shelves where his stone collection is displayed. Kazuma gets upset and...!
13	"Crazy for Komachi-chan"; Transliteration: "Komachi-chan ni Merorinko" (Japanese: 小町ちゃんにメロリンコ)	October 21, 1998
Kazuma goes to Komachi's hair salon to have his hair cut. Tagging along with Kazuma, Ojarumaru becomes a good friend with Komachi. Komachi hates any kind of bugs, so Denbo is pushed out of the salon. Then, the Oni Child Trio come up, pretending they are customers. But, something seems wrong to Aobee.
14	"Kazuma, Afraid of Rocks"; Transliteration: "Kazuma, Ishi o Kowagaru" (Japanese: カズマ、石をこわがる)	October 22, 1998
Kazuma takes Ojarumaru to the Mangan Shrine just outside town. He talks to Ojarumaru about the sacred dogs made of stone. Suddenly, the Oni Child Trio appear and try to get the scepter from Ojaurmaru. While he dodges them, the shrine is damaged. Then, the stone dogs turn into real ones. They are the guardian deities of this shrine.
15	"Grandpa Tommy's Oni Child Welcome Party"; Transliteration: "Tomī-jī no Kooni Kangeikai" (Japanese: トミー爺の子鬼かんげい会)	October 23, 1998
Tommy, Kazuma's grandfather, plans to have a welcome party for the Oni Child Trio so that everybody becomes a good friend to each other. Kazuma and Ojarumaru help him prepare the party. Tommy tries to invite the Oni Child Trio with a mechanical doll made of many sweet dumplings.
16	"Iwashimizu-kun is Always Correct"; Transliteration: "Itsumo Tadashii Iwashimizu-kun" (Japanese: いつも正しい石清水くん)	October 26, 1998
Iwashimizu, Kazuma's classmate and a committee member, detests anything wrong and is very strict on the rules and regulations. He calls Komachi's attention not to bring a hand mirror to school. Then, Ojarumaru comes to visit the class. The prince gathers an instant popularity of the class. Iwashimizu start to call Ojarumaru attention on his age (too young to come to school), his attire, his words, his cap etc.
17	"Denbo in Love"; Transliteration: "Denbo, Koi o Suru" (Japanese: 電ボ、恋をする)	October 27, 1998
Ojarumaru and his messenger Denbo cannot find any insects in Moonlight Town. When they give up the "hunt of insects", Denbo hears a weak cry and he finally finds a bug. He has a feeling more than friendship to this bug. But, it is a cockroach!
18	"Common Taste is a Hardship"; Transliteration: "Shomin no Aji wa Nangi de ojaru" (Japanese: 庶民の味はナンギでおじゃる)	October 28, 1998
Ojarumaru and Denbo enjoy the sauteed beans brought from their time of the Heian era. The next morning, Ojarumaru finds similar beans on the table, which turns out to be fermented beans. Ojarumaru has never tried it before, so he has no idea how sticky it is. And Ojarumaru covered with bean's threads, ends up struggling and rolling in the room. He is exhausted and takes a nap. Then, the Oni Child Trio come up to take the scepter.
19	"Here Comes Princess Okame"; Transliteration: "Okame-hime ga Yattekita" (Japanese: オカメ姫がやってきた)	October 29, 1998
In the Heian era, Princess Okame has been training to jump into "the time ring" so that she can go to the present day where Ojarumaru is enjoying extraordinary life. It's a full moon tonight. Princess Okame jumps into the Full Moon Road reflecting on King Enma's Rock of Tears. She flies into the present time through the time tunnel...!
20	"The Hardworking Twin Dogs"; Transliteration: "Hatarakimono no Futago Inu" (Japanese: はたらき者の双子犬)	October 30, 1998
The guardian dogs of the half-ruined Mangan Shrine, Okorinbou and Nikorinbou, come to see Ojarumaru. They need money to restore the shrine, so they want to earn some by baby-sitting Ojarumaru. The dogs make almost touching efforts to please the prince. Suddenly, the Oni Child Trio come up on their way.
21	"Ojaru Goes to the Supermarket"; Transliteration: "Ojaru Sūpāmāketto e Iku" (Japanese: おじゃるスーパーマーケットへ行く)	November 2, 1998
Kazuma and Ai take Ojarumaru to a supermarket. The prince is so excited and touches anything one after another. Kazuma is then told by his mother to get some eggs. At the egg corner, Kazuma is surprised to see a huge egg. It is not a real egg but a fake which one of the Oni Child Trio's changed shape.
22	"You're Strong, Densho-Firefly"; Transliteration: "Tsuyoi zo Densho-Botaru" (Japanese: つよいぞ電書ボタル)	November 3, 1998
The Oni Child Trio catches Denbo in a net and wants to exchange him with the scepter. Ojarumaru reluctantly puts out the scepter to the Oni Child Trio. Suddenly, the scepter emits fire and the prince saves Denbo. Denbo is shocked by his failure and helplessness and decides to go back to the Heian era.
23	"Grandma Marie is the Rival"; Transliteration: "Raibaru wa Marī-baachan" (Japanese: ライバルはマリー婆ちゃん)	November 4, 1998
Kazuma and Tommy invite Ojarumaru to see Marie. The prince thinks she is a young girl but she is an old lady living alone in a huge residence. Marie is an ostentatious person like Ojarumaru, or, maybe worse. The prince and Marie show off to each other on any topics. It is endless race of vanity and Kazuma and Tommy get tired of watching them soon.
24	"Mr. Ken the Part-Timer"; Transliteration: "Furītā Ken-san" (Japanese: フリーターケンさん)	November 5, 1998
A young guy is calling customers with loud voice at a fish shop. He is Ken, a self-professed freeman who has been changing jobs one after another to find the vocation. He gets a part-time job at the fish shop. Kazuma likes Ken, but Ojarumaru spits out his usual thorny jokes to Ken. Then, Ken gets in very low spirits.
25	"I Want to Be a Ballerina"; Transliteration: "Barerīna ni Naritai de ojaru" (Japanese: バレリーナになりたいでおじゃる)	November 6, 1998
Ojarumaru and Kazuma meet Otome-sensei who is the instructor of ballet lessons. She has a lesson room in Marie's residence. Ojarumaru falls in love with her beauty and wants to be a ballerina. Maybe it is too early by at least 10 years. The prince is so tiny and is absolutely impossible to ballet. Suddenly the Oni Child Trio disguised as ballerinas, creep up to the prince.
26	"Kisuke Becomes a Chick"; Transliteration: "Kisuke Piyoko ni Naru" (Japanese: キスケひよこになる)	November 9, 1998
Kisuke makes up a plan to inducing Ojarumaru into a trap. But he fails due to his own mistake. Shocked, Kisuke wanders in town and see a bird shop. When he imitates a chirping chick, the hen thinks he is one of her chicks.
27	"The Dark Sachiyo Usui"; Transliteration: "Kurai no Usui Sachiyo" (Japanese: 暗いのうすいさちよ)	November 10, 1998
While Kazuma and Kin-chan play soccer in the park, Ojarumaru meets a lady named Sachiyo Usui. She is aiming to be a comic book writer. Usui likes the appearance and attire of the prince and asks him to be a model of her work.
28	"Tsukkii is a Mysterious Guy"; Transliteration: "Tsukkī wa Nazo na Yatsu" (Japanese: ツッキーはナゾなやつ)	November 11, 1998
Princess Okame comes up again to the present time through the Full Moon Road. She almost falls in the pond, but fortunately she lands on a green creature. Princess Okame sees that Kin-chan has a doll just like this green creature. It is an old doll named Tsukkii coming down from generation to generation at Kin-chan's family. Princess Okame takes Kin-chan, Kazuma and Ojarumaru to the pond.
29	"Telephones Are a Hardship"; Transliteration: "Denwa wa Nangi de ojaru" (Japanese: 電話はナンギでおじゃる)	November 12, 1998
On a rainy day, Ojarumaru and Denbo stay home alone. The Oni Child Trio burst in to retrieve the scepter. In the middle of the struggle, the telephone rings. It startles not only Ojarumaru but also the Oni Child Trio. They have never seen the telephone before. The Oni Child Trio run away. It is confusing for the prince to listen to Kazuma's voice from the machine.
30	"Denbo and Akemi"; Transliteration: "Denbo to Akemi" (Japanese: 電ボとアケミ)	November 13, 1998
When Denbo visits Marie's mansion, he meets a parrot named Akemi. They become friends to each other and make a promise that they will take a fly in the air together one day. But Marie tells Denbo not to see Akemi any more. Ojarumaru comes to help miserable Denbo.
31	"Run! Master"; Transliteration: "Hashire! Masutā" (Japanese: 走れ！マスター)	November 16, 1998
Tommy takes Ojarumaru to a coffee shop run by Mike, the mayor of Moonlight Town. Suddenly, Mike asks Tommy to take care of the shop and rushes out. He has another face called "Coffee Mask". His secret mission is to keep peace in the town.
32	"The Light of Hope for Sachiyo Usui"; Transliteration: "Usui Sachiyo ni Kibou no Hikari" (Japanese: うすいさちよに希望の光)	November 17, 1998
Ken takes a part time job as a delivery man at a soba restaurant. When he delivers a bowl of soba noodles to Sachiyo Usui's apartment, the young comic book writer falls down. She has been working without taking any food and sleep to make the deadline. Ken offers his help, but Usui almost gives up to finish her work in time.
33	"Komachi-chan Sets Her Own Pace"; Transliteration: "Komachi-chan wa Mai Pēsu" (Japanese: 小町ちゃんはマイペース)	November 18, 1998
Kazuma wants to improve the defensive skills of Komachi and Kin-chan. As usual, Komachi comes up very late. Finally Kazuma starts knocking soccer balls to Komachi and Kin-chan, but they can not receive it at all. No wonder – Komachi holds the hand mirror and Kin-chan has candy. Kazuma snatches them out of their hands. Then, the mirror and candy disappear mysteriously.
34	Transliteration: "Kūru ja no Rei Tessai" (Japanese: クールじゃの冷徹斎)	November 19, 1998
At a crossroad in Moonlight Town, a man in black with black glasses runs a small work stand. He is a fortuneteller called Cold Tessai. Ojarumaru and Kazuma ask him to find out what happened in their previous lives, but he says he does not work free. Then three big bear dolls approach. They are the disguised Oni Child Trio.
35	"Great King Enma is Very Much Annoyed"; Transliteration: "Enma Daiō Dai Yowari" (Japanese: エンマ大王大よわり)	November 20, 1998
There is a big castle of Great King Enma in Enma World. The castle is overflowed with the deceased who have not been given their destinations; the heaven or the preaching chamber. Suddenly, Great King Enma's scepter pops back, but Ojarumaru follows it. The prince tells all the deceased that they can go to whichever places they like. Oops! The whole castle turns into turmoil!
36	"Welcome to the Oni Child House"; Transliteration: "Kooni Hasu e Youkoso" (Japanese: 子鬼ハウスへようこそ)	November 23, 1998
On a sunny day, Ojarumaru, Kazuma, Tommy, Kin-chan, and Komachi are enjoying semi-camping in the yard. The prince tells Tommy about the scepter of Great King Enma. He justifies his conducts 100%. The Oni Child Trio retrieves the scepter after Ojarumaru accidentally tosses it up in the air when it got too hot from the grill. Suddenly, it begins to thunder and a scared Kisuke accidentally lets go of the scepter, which allows Ojarumaru to gain possession of it again. A heavy rain shower begins, which ends the semi-camp, and the Oni Child Trio take shelter under a tree. Later, a small robot with a huge umbrella in its hand comes up in front of them.
37	"The Twin Dogs' Human Walk"; Transliteration: "Futago Inu no Ningen Sanpo" (Japanese: 双子犬の人間散歩)	November 24, 1998
Due to the scarce offerings, Okorinbou and Nikorinbou decide to earn some money by themselves. They offer a "ride" on their backs to Ojarumaru and Marie. Unfortunately, the dogs get lost in Moonlight Town.
38	"I Love Slow Clocks"; Transliteration: "Yukkuri Tokei ga Suki de ojaru" (Japanese: ユックリ時計が好きでおじゃる)	November 25, 1998
Interested in the clock ticking the time precisely, Ojarumaru stores it in his cap and is startled when the alarm goes off. Kazuma explains to the prince how a clock works. The prince is shocked to know that the time gets fast, gets slow, or even stops. In his home in the Heian era, the time always goes by regularly.
39	"Cake is Scary!"; Transliteration: "Kēki Kowai! de ojaru" (Japanese: ケーキこわい！でおじゃる)	November 26, 1998
Kazuma takes Ojarumaru to the confectionery shop. He tells the prince that the sweet cakes are as good as pudding. Unfortunately, the shop is closed. The prince begs Kazuma to get a wedding cake in the store window, but Kazuma says that he can not have it unless someone gets married. Ojarumaru asks Kazuma, Usui or anybody to get married immediately.
40	"Iwa Shimizu-kun's Best Friend"; Transliteration: "Iwa Shimizu-kun no Daishinyū" (Japanese: 石清水君の大親友)	November 27, 1998
Iwashimizu hates to waist time. He is also nervous at any sounds when he studies at home. Embarrassed by the loud laughs of his mother and friends, Iwashimizu goes out to take a walk. When he sees Ojarumaru and Kazuma carrying Kin-chan's gold fish, the Oni Child Trio leap at them. The gold fish falls into the river and Iwashimizu dives in the river to get it back.
41	"Moonlight Herb is Best for Health"; Transliteration: "Kenkou Ichiban Gekkousou" (Japanese: 健康いちばん月光草)	November 30, 1998
Moonlight Herb is a unique plant growing in Moonlight Town only. It fully grows up in one night when it is bathed by the moonlight. The Oni Child Trio are surprised when they see Tommy picking Moonlight Herb. It also grows in Enma World and is the most favorite vegetable of Great King Enma. Kisuke tastes it and discovers that his body is filled with energy. Moonlight Herb is healthy food.
42	"Kimi-chan Finds Happiness"; Transliteration: "Kimi-chan Shiawase ni Naru" (Japanese: 公ちゃん幸せになる)	December 1, 1998
Cold Tessai the fortuneteller hires a partner named Kimi-chan the Hamster. Kimi-chan tells convincing fortunes by spinning a wheel. However, she has her own worry, and nobody else but Ojarumaru knows it.
43	"The Best Present of All"; Transliteration: "Saikou no Otodoke Mono" (Japanese: 最高のお届けもの)	December 2, 1998
When Ojarumaru wakes up, nobody is at home. He sees a beautifully wrapped box in the entrance. The prince finds pudding inside and hide it in his cap. Kazuma finds it and accuses Ojarumaru. The prince gets ashamed and walks away from home.
44	"The Capital is Wherever I Sit"; Transliteration: "Maro ga Suwareba Miyako de ojaru" (Japanese: マロが座れば都でおじゃる)	December 3, 1998
While having pudding in front of the apartment, Ojarumaru sees a snail feeling bad on a leaf. He takes it to the park nearby. The snail's name is Katapi and it has been traveling around the world. The Oni Child Trio jump at the prince again for the scepter. He narrowly escapes thanks to the snail's help.
45	"A Storm of Flowers in Moonlight Town"; Transliteration: "Gekkō Chō ni Hanafubiki" (Japanese: 月光町に花ふぶき)	December 4, 1998
It's Flower Day and all the children give flowers to their parents. Kazuma goes to the flower shop where Ken is working temporarily. Marie appears and asks Ken to pay the rent. Ken moved into an apartment behind Marie's mansion. Marie and Ken starts quarreling on trifles.
46	"Who's the Ambassador of Moonlight Town?"; Transliteration: "Gekkō Chō Taishi wa Dare de ojaru?" (Japanese: 月光町大使はだれでおじゃる？)	December 7, 1998
Mike the Coffee Mask is delivering the leaflets of "Moonshine's Ambassador Contest". Komachi decides to enter the contest with no hesitation. She is confident to win. Ojarumaru transforms himself into a girl with the power of the scepter and enters the contest too. Then, the Oni Child Trio come back to retrieve the scepter.
47	"The Prince on a White Dog"; Transliteration: "Shiroinu Notta Oujisama" (Japanese: 白犬にのった王子様)	December 8, 1998
While riding on Okorinbou, Ojarumaru sees two tiny turtles at the pet shop and feels pity. He begs Okorinbou several times and manages to borrow some money from the offering box. Then the prince saves the turtles out of the pet shop. To his astonishment, they are the same turtles living in the pond in the Heian era!
48	"Ojaru Goes Down in History"; Transliteration: "Ojaru Rekishi ni Nokoru" (Japanese: おじゃる、歴史に残る)	December 9, 1998
Grandpa Tommy takes Ojarumaru and Kazuma to a cave. He wants to find a historical painting on the wall. Komachi pops up and ask Kazuma to check her ballet training. Then, the Oni Child Trio charge on to Ojarumaru. Komachi is awkward; ballet steps knock them down like kung-fu kicks. Suddenly the wall falls down and an old painting comes up.
49	Transliteration: "Narabeba Yoi Koto Aru de ojaru" (Japanese: 並べばよいことあるでおじゃる)	December 10, 1998
Ojarumaru sees people standing in a long line in the shopping street. He is told they give out sweet cake. He gets in line but unfortunately the last cake is given out to a lady just in front of him. Then, Ken invites him to the lottery. Although the prince just got a packet of tissue paper, he jumps in when he sees a line of people for anything.
50	Transliteration: "Denbo Gei o Oboeru" (Japanese: 電ボ芸をおぼえる)	December 11, 1998
Denbo comes back through the Full Moon Road from the Heian era. He sees a sparrow practicing "Walk on the tight rope". The sparrow named Chuntarou, is a member of traveling acrobat party. Denbo is invited to the party and comes up with Ojarumaru. They are attacked by the Oni Child Trio and the stage is destroyed. Tommy repairs the stage, but the leader of the party gets sick of hard work.
51	"Kin-chan Fishes for Friends"; Transliteration: "Kin-chan Tomodachi o Tsuru" (Japanese: 金ちゃん友だちを釣る)	December 14, 1998
Kin-chan comes to the Moonlight Pond. He wants to catch Tsukkii despite Kazuma's warning. However, there is no sign of 'pull' for a long time. Being tired of waiting, Kazuma starts playing soccer with Ojarumaru. Then, Kin-chan yells out. He finally catches Tsukkii.
52	"Ojaru Climbs a Mountain"; Transliteration: "Ojaru Yama o Noboru" (Japanese: おじゃる山にのぼる)	December 15, 1998
Kazuma invites Ojarumaru to climb the steep mountain called "Oni Mountain" in Moonlight Town. The prince gets tired soon and Kazuma has to carry the lazy kid on his back. Meanwhile, the Oni Child Trio take a short cut to ambush the prince and Kazuma. But to do so, they have to challenge rock-climbing.
53	"Hot-Blooded Honda-sensei"; Transliteration: "Nekketsu Honda-sensei" (Japanese: 熱血本田先生)	December 16, 1998
Honda-sensei, the teacher of Kazuma's class, is the devoted teacher with jogging being his daily exercise. Honda-sensei meets Kazuma carrying Ojarumaru. He has been curious about the prince, but "not to interfere one's private life" is his motto. Then, the Oni Child Trio pop up to take back the prince's scepter.
54	"God Appears at Mangan Shrine"; Transliteration: "Mangan Jinja ni Kami-sama Arawaru" (Japanese: 満願神社に神さまあらわる)	December 17, 1998
Ojarumaru wants to know what is inside of the shrine. Okorinbou and Nikorinbou try to stop him. Instead, they are taken in prince's sweet words and follow him inside. The walls and floors are covered with moss, spider webs and mushrooms. They find a large strange-looking mushroom. It is not a mushroom but the God of Poverty who brings nothing but bad luck to anyone.
55	"Marie Mansion's Treasure"; Transliteration: "Marie Yashiki no Takaramono" (Japanese: マリーやしきのたからもの)	December 18, 1998
Ojarumaru and Kazuma helps Tommy to excavate Marie's backyard. Okorinbou, Nikorinbou and the Oni Child Trio are peeping into the yard behind the bushes. The dogs expects treasure and the oni want the scepter. The dogs offer their help to Tommy. They are sniffing around and smell something in the ground. An urn and a small box come out. Then, Marie snatches the box in a flurry.
56	"The Keeping Tamura Family"; Transliteration: "Totteoku Tamura-san Ikka" (Japanese: とっておく田村さん一家)	December 21, 1998
Ojarumaru finds Kazuma's old toy in the closet and puts it in his cap. Kazuma asks the prince to bring it back. But the prince talks him down, saying Kazuma just keeps it without playing it for a long time. To keep anything in the closet is not only Kazuma's habit but his parents have the same habit.
57	"Ojaru Has a Camera"; Transliteration: "Ojaru Kamera o Motsu" (Japanese: おじゃるカメラを持つ)	December 22, 1998
The Oni Child Trio flee away when they see Tommy taking a photo of them. Tommy follows them to the park where Ojarumaru and Kazuma are playing. Kazuma asks Tommy to take a shot, but Ojarumaru is frightened. He thinks he will be sucked into the camera.
58	"Ojaru Goes to Yoshiko Tanaka's Store"; Transliteration: "Ojaru Tanaka Yoshiko no Mise ni Iku" (Japanese: おじゃるタナカヨシコの店に行く)	December 23, 1998
Ojarumaru and Tommy visit Yoshiko Tanaka's variety shop. Yoshiko likes the prince's scepter and wants to exchange her photo. The prince turns down, but Yoshiko insists on. Ojarumaru offers Denbo instead of the scepter.
59	"Great King Enma Shouted from His Gut"; Transliteration: "Hara kara Sakenda Enma Daiou" (Japanese: 腹からさけんだエンマ大王)	December 24, 1998
Denbo has a stomachache. He had too many cold drinks. He can not fly for a long time as he feels pain on his belly in the wind. He takes a rest near the tent of the Oni Child Trio. Then, something zooms at him and sticks on his belly. He thinks it is moxa and lights it for moxabustion. Suddenly, a loud voice bursts out of it. It is not a moxa, but the message sent for the Oni Child Trio from Great King Enma in the Heian era.
60	"Shopping With Ojaru"; Transliteration: "Ojaru Kaimono ni Tsukiau" (Japanese: おじゃる買いものにつきあう)	December 25, 1998
Tommy makes another mechanical doll. He names it "The Shopping Doll" as it goes out shopping while he is busy studying. The doll goes out to buy apples and milk with Ojarumaru. The doll orders "appludding" at the grocery shop The doll confuses the apple and pudding when Ojarumaru asks it to buy pudding.
61	"The Poverty God Who Cried"; Transliteration: "Naita Binbougami" (Japanese: 泣いた貧乏神)	December 28, 1998
The God of Poverty moves into the house of Sachiyo. Ojarumaru finds her getting leaner day by day and asks Okorinbou and Nikorinbou to take the God of Poverty back to the shrine. They finally agree to the prince and try to drag the God of Poverty out of Sachiyo's house. But the god likes her so much and wants to make her more miserable.
62	"Otome-sensei Completely Becomes a Swan"; Transliteration: "Otome-sensei Hakuchou ni Narikiri" (Japanese: 乙女先生 白鳥になりきる)	December 29, 1998
Tommy is surprised to see Otome-sensei squatting in the bird shack. She says she wants to be a swan, so Tommy gives her hand-made wings. She wears the wings, but Ojarumaru thinks of her as an angel, not a swan. Later, she thinks on the bank of pond how she can change herself into a swan. Ken misunderstands that she commits suicide.
63	"I Want a Bike"; Transliteration: "Charin ga Hoshī de ojaru" (Japanese: チャリンがほしいでおじゃる)	December 30, 1998
Ojarumaru wants a saving box when he sees Kazuma putting some coins in his. The prince likes the clinging sound when the coins drop inside. He sees the guardian dogs are collecting contribution on the street. The prince invites Okorinbou to Kazuma's house, so that he can hear the clinging sound if Kazuma's family offers some coins.
64	"The Tortoise, the Hare, and Ojarumaru"; Transliteration: "Usagi to Kame to Ojarumaru" (Japanese: ウサギとカメとおじゃる丸)	January 4, 1999
The turtle sisters, Tome and Kame, say Ojarumaru is slower than a turtle. The prince takes them on for a race: to go to Grandpa Tommy's house and return here. The slowest race in the history begins. Nobody knows when it is over. The Oni Child Trio disguise themselves as rabbits and prepare to ambush the prince at Tommy's house. But, their disguise is easily spotted.
65	Transliteration: "Kazuma Ishi o Tebanasu" (Japanese: カズマ 石を手ばなす)	January 5, 1999
Ojarumaru picks up a stone for Kazuma at a place called "Hideout of Oni" in Moonlight Town. Kazuma likes it and keeps it on his bed at night. Then, he hears someone crying. He is shocked to find out the stone is weeping. Kazuma decides to take it back to the place where it was found.
66	"Ojaru Finding Things"; Transliteration: "Ojaru Hiroi Mono o Suru" (Japanese: おじゃる 拾いものをする)	January 6, 1999
When Ojarumaru visits a police box, he likes a policeman's club. On his way back home, the prince sees Kinchan taking a foreigner to the police box. Kin-chan is so honest to bring anything he finds to the police box. The Oni Child Trio plan to change themselves into something valuable to be brought to the police box where Ojarumaru is resting.
67	"Denbo vs Denki"; Transliteration: "Denbo tai Denki" (Japanese: 電ボ 対 電キ)	January 7, 1999
Ojarumaru discovers that the house is lighted by electricity. He wants to see the electricity, but Kazuma says it is impossible. The prince wants to ask the electricity to light up his parents' mansion in the Heian era. Denbo is afraid he might lose his job, so he decides to be an apprentice of Mr. Electricity.
68	"Ojaru and the Oni Go to an Island"; Transliteration: "Ojaru Oni ga Shima e Iku" (Japanese: おじゃる鬼が島へ行く)	January 8, 1999
Ojarumaru picks up a book in the bookshop. He likes fairy tales and continues to read more books. He does not care about the shopkeeper's grimace. The Oni Child Trio surround the prince and take back the scepter. But they are charmed by the fairy tales and are sucked with the prince into the world of fairy tales.
69	"I am a Second Generation Coffee Mask?"; Transliteration: "Maro wa Nidaime Kōhī Kamen?" (Japanese: マロは二代目コーヒー仮面?)	January 11, 1999
Mike the Coffee Mask can not carry his role as "a mask man" and asks Ojarumaru to succeed it. The prince accepts, but soon Mike finds the prince is not good for this role. Tommy comes up with an idea to help Mike.
70	"Kin Papa Strives for Health"; Transliteration: "Kin Papa Kenkou ni Hagemu" (Japanese: 金パパ健康にはげむ)	January 12, 1999
Kin-chan's father wants to maintain his health for his family. He begins skipping rope, but it is no fun to do it alone. He invites Ojarumaru to join the exercise, but the prince has no interest in moving his muscles. Then the father invites the Oni Child Trio but they run away with fear. The prince cajoles Kin-chan's father to give up the exercise. The father insists to climb several steps at least, but the prince has no intention to waste his energy.
71	"The Hamster Vanishes Twice"; Transliteration: "Hamustā wa 2-dou Kieru" (Japanese: ハムスターは2度消える)	January 13, 1999
Kimi-chan is working at the fortune telling stand of Cold Tessai. Kimi-chan likes Ojarumaru and wants to be his pet. When he moves into Kazuma's house, she is shocked to see the prince idling all day long. Kimi-chan knows the gap and difference of life style between Ojarumaru and hers. She goes back to the Cold Tessai's place.
72	"Flowers For Okorinbou"; Transliteration: "Okorinbou ni Hanataba o" (Japanese: オコリン坊に花束を)	January 14, 1999
A foreign girl named Jessica comes to visit Okorinbou everyday. Okorinbou decides to keep his status as a stone guardian to see her. One day, Ojarumaru sees Jessica and her parents going into a pet shop. Jessica comes out with a puppy in her arms. The puppy is just like Okorinbou. The dog Jessica used to have looked like Okorinbou.
73	"Mama Takes the Day Off"; Transliteration: "Mama Mama o Saboru" (Japanese: ママ ママをさぼる)	January 15, 1999
Ojarumaru admires Ai's skill to peel the skin of apples. Ai is not pleased at all. She looks tired of all the works the mother takes care of in the house. The prince tells her to take a break, but it's not easy for Ai. So Kazuma and his dad, Makoto, take up Ai's works.
74	"Ken Becomes a Thinking Person"; Transliteration: "Ken Kangaeru Hito ni Naru" (Japanese: ケン考える人になる)	January 18, 1999
Ken takes a part time job at Mike's coffee shop. Soon he gets bored of extreme quietness of this shop. He likes working hard and vigorously. When he goes out on an errand, he helps Ojarumaru, Tome and Kame. The turtle sisters give him a treasure box. When Ken opens it, the smoke comes out. Ken is panicked he might get old instantly, however, he does not change. In fact, the smoke has the power to makes the brain more wrinkled so that a person will be "a thinking man". Ken becomes a man of deep thoughts.
75	"Refresh at the Oni Mountain"; Transliteration: "Oni ga Yama de Rifuresshu" (Japanese: オニが山でリフレッシュ)	January 19, 1999
Kazuma and Ojarumaru go up on Oni Mountain with Komachi and Kin-chan for camping. The prince meets a grasshopper named Geese. Geese's dream is to visit a town some day. However, Geese's thought begins changing while he is watching what the kids from town are doing. They are so clumsy to prepare the meal. Some of them are so lazy as to giving no help to the others.
76	"Denbo Masters Mimicry"; Transliteration: "Denbo Monomane o Kiwameru" (Japanese: 電ボモノマネをきわめる)	January 20, 1999
When Kazuma asks if Denbo's mimicry is so good, Ojarumaru replies it is far from the real persons. Denbo is shocked when he listens to his recording on tape. It is really terrible. He has hard training in the prince's cap and his mimicry is improved amazingly. He devotes himself in training too much and loses his own voice.
77	"Ojaru Saves the World"; Transliteration: "Ojaru Chikyuu o Sukuu" (Japanese: おじゃる地球を救う)	January 21, 1999
When Ojarumaru and Kazuma are relaxing on a hill, an alien with strange hair style appears. His name is Hoshino who comes to earth to finish his homework for his summer vacation. The alien wants to take the scepter from the prince, but the prince take it back easily. Then, Hoshino wants to collect a sample inhabitant on earth and grabs the prince with his magic hand. Ojarumaru then grabs the alien with his scepter.
78	"A Town Without Tsukkii"; Transliteration: "Tsukki no Kieta Machi" (Japanese: ツッキーの消えた町)	January 22, 1999
79	"Cow Becomes a Deer"; Transliteration: "Ushi Shika ni Naru" (Japanese: 牛鹿になる)	January 25, 1999
80	"The God of Poverty's Latent Energy"; Transliteration: "Binbōgami no Sokodjikara" (Japanese: 貧乏神の底力)	January 26, 1999
81	Transliteration: "Medetai nō Honda-sensei" (Japanese: めでたいのう本田先生)	January 27, 1999
82	"Which Tea is the Best?"; Transliteration: "Dono Ocha Ichiban?" (Japanese: どのお茶いちばん？)	January 28, 1999
83	"Captain Aobee"; Transliteration: "Kyaputen Aobee" (Japanese: キャプテン·アオベエ)	January 29, 1999
84	Transliteration: "Ojaru Migotona Shaku Sabaki" (Japanese: おじゃるみごとなシャクさばき)	February 1, 1999
85	"Mr. Udon Seller and the Childhood Friend"; Transliteration: "Udonya-san to Osananajimi" (Japanese: うどん屋さんとおさななじみ)	February 2, 1999
86	"Ojaru Becomes the First God"; Transliteration: "Ojaru Tsuitachi Kamisama ni Naru" (Japanese: おじゃる 一日神さまになる)	February 3, 1999
87	Transliteration: "Komachi Papa wa Biyōshi-san" (Japanese: 小町パパは美容師さん)	4 February 1999
88	"Full of Troubles: Mr. Shōshin"; Transliteration: "Nayami ga Ippai Shōshin-san" (Japanese: なやみがいっぱい 小心さん)	5 February 1999
89	Transliteration: "Ojaru to Kin-chan Kurabekko Suru" (Japanese: おじゃると金ちゃん くらべっこする)	8 February 1999
90	"Until We Meet Again"; Transliteration: "Mata au Hi made" (Japanese: また会う日まで)	9 February 1999
In Oni Forest, Ojarumaru and Denbo meet a talking tree named Kinoshita.

=== Series 2 (1999) ===
No.	Title	Original release date
91	"The Scepter is Testy"	April 5, 1999
The scepter is forced to choose between the Oni Child Trio and Ojarumaru. It picks Ojarumaru, but he works it so hard, it leaves home. Kazuma, Ojarumaru and Denbo go look for it.
92	"The Oni Child Apprenticing"	April 6, 1999
The Oni Child Trio become the pupils of a poet, Kobayashi Tea, so they can challenge Ojarumaru with a poem. They challenge Ojarumaru and find out he reads a different kind of poem.
93	"Ojaru Goes to a Haunted House"	April 7, 1999
Ojarumaru, Kazuma, Denbo and Kin-chan go to a haunted house and run into Usui. The Oni Child Trio show up but Usui scares them away.
94	"Denbo and the Ohagi"	April 8, 1999
Denbo falls in love with an ohagi, Ohagi-chan, at a sweet stand. The manager changed its looks and name for a new season. Ken who works there tells Denbo that Ohagi-chan has left, so he won't be hurt.
95	"The Performance Seller is Fun"	April 9, 1999
Ojarumaru finds a performance seller, Oshino, in a street. Ojarumaru gets more popular with a crowd, so Oshino challenges him, but gets beaten.
96	"Go Forward, Mechanical Laundry Doll"	April 12, 1999
Tommy invents the Mechanical Laundry Doll to do the laundry for him, but it gets out of control.
97	"A Love Letter to Akane"	April 13, 1999
The frustrated Great King Enma sends Green Oni to see the Oni Child Trio. Green Oni finds Akane and writes her a love letter, but decides to go back without seeing her. Green Oni goes back without his mission accomplished.
98	"N/A"	April 14, 1999
The Oni Child Trio chase Kazuma, Ojarumaru and Denbo into a cemetery. A tomb talks to Kazuma there.
99	"The Twin Dogs Fight"	April 15, 1999
The twin dogs at Mangan Shrine fight one another over whether to let the God of Poverty go or not to save the shrine. Nikorinbou insists on keeping the god and Okorinbou gives in.
100	"Ojaru Plays With the Poverty God"	April 16, 1999
Ojarumaru is bored and decides to play, using the God of Poverty. He attaches the god to everyone in town and depresses them.
101	"Denbo Grumbles"	April 19, 1999
Denbo eats vegetables pickled in sake lees and gets drunk. He makes honest comments on Ojarumaru and upsets him, but chases away the Oni Child Trio.
102	"The Fake Scepter Appears"	April 20, 1999
Great King Enma sends a fake scepter to replace the scepter in Ojarumaru's possession. The fake scepter tries to take the scepter into going back to the Heian era, but the scepter insists on staying with Ojarumaru.
103	"N/A"	April 21, 1999
Ai and Kazuma go shopping leaving Makoto and Ojarumaru at home. Makoto and Ojarumaru enjoy their absence at first, but they realize they can't do anything without them.
104	"Ojaru Plays Golf"	April 22, 1999
Ojarumaru tries golf with Kin-chan, but he can't hit the ball. He finally uses the scepter and makes a good shot.
105	"Find Cold Tessai"	April 23, 1999
Cold Tessai gets jealous of popular Kimi-chan and disappears. Ojarumaru takes his place, but he doesn't translate Kimi-chan's fortune-telling correctly and loses customers. Kimi-chan goes to find Cold Tessai.
106	"Yoshiko Tanaka's Treasure Mountain"	April 26, 1999
Ojarumaru follows Yoshiko Tanaka to an old house with many unwanted items. He picks up a spoon and Yoshiko tricks him into exchanging it for a broken fan.
107	"The Master is Nervous"	April 27, 1999
Honda-sensei and Usui come over to Mike's café and surprise everyone. Because Tommy's not there, Mike cannot become Coffee Mask and gets nervous.
108	"Oja-Derella"	April 28, 1999
Kazuma and Ojarumaru read a book, Oja-Derella. In the story, Oja-Derella drops her scepter on the way back from the ball at Prince Kazuma's castle. The prince finds the princess and they live happily ever after.
109	"N/A"	April 29, 1999
Yoshiko Tanaka goes to Mangan Shrine for stocking. She finds a chest of drawer used by the God of poverty there. She exchanges it for many items for the God of Poverty, and the god gets to stay at the shrine for a long time.
110	"The Oni Child's Return Home"	April 30, 1999
Great King Enma tries to bring back the Oni Child Trio to give them a break. The Oni Child Trio are afraid and try to make a scepter on Ojarumaru's idea in vain.
111	"Okame Transforms"	May 3, 1999
Princess Okame does a makeover at Komachi's salon to impress Ojarumaru. Ojarumaru doesn't like any of her new hairdos.
112	"N/A"	May 4, 1999
When Otome-sensei is having a problem with getting the heart of a "Chestnut and Nut Cracker," Tommy comes up with a new wind-up doll. The doll helps Otome-sensei dance for her performance.
113	"N/A"	May 5, 1999
Ojarumaru fights with Kazuma, jumps out of the apartment and goes to see Kinchan. He asks Kinchan to be his older brother, but he realizes he should be the older brother. Kazuma ends up getting another younger brother in the end!
114	"Stuffed Town"	May 6, 1999
Tommy gives away his wind-up dolls, and the Oni Child Trio give away their old costumes at a flea market, but they eventually come back for different reasons.
115	"Tommy's Memories"	May 7, 1999
Tommy remembers his wife Sally and his youth with Ojarumaru.
116	"N/A"	May 10, 1999
Ojarumaru learns about mail and wants to get some, so he exchanges a piece with Tommy. He gets frustrated because it takes a long time to get mail from him, but he eventually gets it and he's content.
117	"Smiling Moonlight Town"	May 11, 1999
Usui's poor and depressing portraits of people drive people to smile more.
118	"The Moonlight Town Tiny Things Club"	May 12, 1999
Ojarumaru gets jealous of Kazuma's family being in clubs, so he decides to make one with other small ones.
119	"Flowers and Lines"	May 13, 1999
Kazuma, Ojarumaru and Denbo visit newlyweds Honda-sensei and Asako. Their house is filled with flower-patterned stuff. Ojarumaru finds out none of them like them. They decide to switch to straight lines.
120	"Kin-chan Mama is a Skillful Laundry"	May 14, 1999
Kazuma, Ojarumaru, Denbo and Kin-chan go into Kin-chan's yard and lose their way. So do the Oni Child Trio.
121	"Ojaru Goes to the Sea"	May 17, 1999
Ken drives Ojarumaru, Denbo, Kazuma, Kin-chan and Komachi to the sea and they have a good time on the beach.
122	"Denbo and the Dandelion"	May 18, 1999
Denbo falls in love with a dandelion, but the dandelion goes away as seeds.
123	"Hoshino Again"	May 19, 1999
Hoshino invites Ojarumaru, Kazuma and Denbo to his spaceship. Hoshino's parents want Earth, so they try to ask Ojarumaru for it, but they're too shy to ask.
124	"Save Tsukkii"	May 20, 1999
The long spell of dry weather dries up the Moonlight Pond where Tsukkii lives. Ojarumaru and the others successfully start rain with Ojarumaru's "rain dance".
125	"Enma Becomes Kisuke"	May 21, 1999
Having lost patience, Great King Enma takes Kisuke's body with a magic spell and tries to get the scepter back from Ojarumaru. He finds out the Oni Child Trio are not doing a bad job.
126	"N/A"	May 24, 1999
After Ojarumaru and Denbo see Kazuma's family rush in the morning, they go out looking for relaxation. Okorinbou and Nikorinbou come along looking for "plenty". Poverty-chan's sewing service brings them money. They all get what they wanted back at the shrine.
127	"N/A"	May 25, 1999
Ojarumaru's poems depress Moonlight Town's symbol, a maple tree. The townies decorate the tree to raise its spirit on Tree Day. The town blacks out in the evening, but Denbo brings his family to light up the tree.
128	"The Performance Seller Doll Ukkun"	May 26, 1999
Performance seller, Oshino, comes back to Moonlight Town to revenge on Ojarumaru. He brings a doll for ventriloquism, Ukkun. Ojarumaru believes Ukkun is alive and cries.
129	"Moonlight Soba Creation"	May 27, 1999
Kii-chan tries soba for the first time and loves it, so he comes up with Moonlight Soba with the help of Tommy for the noodle joint he runs with Tatsu-chan.
130	"Ojaru Turns Up to Stick"	May 28, 1999
Makoto gives Ojarumaru a couple of stickers. Ojarumaru loves them and puts them on all over the apartment. Kazuma gets angry and Ojarumaru goes out looking for stickers. Coffee Mask gives him a box full of compresses and Ojarumaru puts them on old people's bodies and they appreciate it.
131	"The Mangan Shrine Sparkles"	May 31, 1999
The God of Fortune comes to the Mangan Shrine and turns the shrine shiny, but she turns out to be lazy and stingy, and has no taste, so Okorinbou kicks her out.
132	"Thank You, Papa"	June 1, 1999
Komachi's father worries over Komachi's future.
133	"N/A"	June 2, 1999
Ai tries to cook the foreign dish she learned in a cooking class for her family, but fails many times and they all get hungry.
134	"Denbo Masters Mimicry 2"	June 3, 1999
Denbo masters mimicry again, but he forgets his own voice again.
135	"Marching! Tiny Things Club"	June 4, 1999
Kin-chan's carp, Paku-chan, swallowed his mother's stuff. The members of Moonlight Town's Tiny Things Club go into Paku-chan's mouth and look for it.
136	"Cold Tessai Confides a Fortune"	June 7, 1999
Kimi-chan's fortune-telling is very accurate and Cold Tessai asks her where his destiny lady is.
137	"Ojaru Lends the Scepter"	June 8, 1999
The Oni Child Trio try to get the scepter back from Ojarumaru in exchange for many gifts from Great King Enma. Okorinbou and Nikorinbou need money to renovate the shrine, so they try to do it feeling guilty.
138	"The Fair-Skinned Mr. Kanbutsu"	June 9, 1999
Ojarumaru and Denbo visit a grocery store and meet the owner, Mr. Kanbutsu. He explains to them how great dried food is.
139	"Ms. Usui and Mr. Kanbutsu"	June 10, 1999
Mr. Kanbutsu and Usui run into each other at Oni Mountain and hit it off.
140	"A Happy Red Thread Telephone"	June 11, 1999
King Enma sends Green Oni to check on the Oni Child Trio once again. Green Oni comes up with a way to communicate with Akane by a thread telephone.
141	"Ojaru Makes Pottery"	October 4, 1999
Tommy takes Ojarumaru, Kazuma and Denbo to Oni Mountain to see his old friend and a genius potter, Tazan. Tazan loves Ojarumaru's work and wants to take him on as his pupil.
142	"The Meal Snack Came Back"	October 5, 1999
Tommy, Kazuma, Ojarumaru and Denbo go on a picnic. They follow the rice balls Denbo dropped into a cave. They run into Tazan and he tells them he ate Denbo's rice balls. Tazan gives them two boxes of goodies.
143	"Ojaru Slips the Mouth"	October 6, 1999
Princess Okame visits Ojarumaru on Doll's Festival. Ojarumaru gives her a cold shoulder at first, but he sees the boys in Kazuma's class get friendly with her, and changes his mind.
144	"Ken Becomes a Popular Person"	October 7, 1999
Ken starts working for Yoshiko Tanaka's store and puts on a hero costume. He gets popular among kids, but as soon as he takes off the costume, he loses his popularity.
145	"Ms. Usui Becomes a Heroine"	October 8, 1999
Ken tells Usui if she's trying to be a comic book artist, she should have enough dream to share with the readers. Usui tries to be a heroine of a girl comic book and imitate Otome-sensei, but realizes she's fine the way she is.
146	"Ojaru Goes to an Island"	October 11, 1999
Ojaumaru's taken away on Tsukkii's back to the middle of a pond with the Oni Child Trio. They try to escape together.
147	"The Testimony Rock of Love"	October 12, 1999
Kin-chan's father picks up a diamond ring for his wife on their wedding anniversary. Kazuma suggests he pick "an ordinary rock" to get across his love to his wife better.
148	"It's Moonlight Town, Nephew"	October 13, 1999
Denbo's nephew, Denbo Gorō, visits Denbo in Moonlight Town. He falls in love with Akemi, but finds out Akemi is Denbo's girlfriend.
149	"The Director and the Ghost"	October 14, 1999
Marie hears weird sound in her house and calls Tommy for help. The Haunted House Director shows up and tells her that her attic is haunted by ghosts. He tells them that he'd make the ghosts leave, but he keeps them in one of the rooms in Marie's backyard in which he starts living as a tenant.
150	"Ojaru Enters the Cap"	October 15, 1999
Ojarumaru goes into the cap and gets big. He realizes it's not as great being big as he thought it was.
151	"Rainy Day Sugoroku"	October 18, 1999
Because it's raining outside, Kazuma, Ojarumaru and Denbo decide to make a game and play Sugoroku. They have a hard time finishing it.
152	"The Mechanical Ojaru Doll"	October 19, 1999
Aobee asks Tommy for help in getting the scepter back from Ojarumaru. Tommy tries to help him with the Mechanical Ojaru Doll.
153	"Figure Collecting"	October 20, 1999
The Haunted House Director likes collecting interesting figure's prints and gets help from Ojarumaru and Denbo to ask the God of Poverty.
154	"Aka Murasaki Comes Over"	October 21, 1999
Ojarumaru's private teacher in the Heian era, Aka Murasaki Shikibu, is coming to see him. Ojaurmaru has to look like he's been studying hard and tries to get help from Kazuma's family.
155	"Okame Saves the World"	October 22, 1999
Princess Okame comes to visit Ojarumaru and runs into Hoshino. Ojarumaru and Princess Okame are invited to Hoshino's house. Hoshino's mother beats Ojarumaru's scepter in arm-wrestling, but Okame beats her and Hoshino's family gives up on taking Earth.
156	"Denbo and the Persimmon"	October 25, 1999
Denbo falls in love with a persimmon which grows more beautiful day by day. One day, the persimmon is dried up.
157	"The Tiny Things Club Newspaper"	October 26, 1999
The Tiny Things Club decide to publish a newspaper to advertise the club.
158	"Ojaru Turns Up to Touch"	October 27, 1999
Ojarumaru gets the urge to touch something that feels good.
159	"N/A"	October 28, 1999
Ojarumaru leans the flavor of dried food from Mr. Kanbutsu.
160	"Aim at the Moonlight Tower"	October 29, 1999
Kazuma, his dad, and Ojarumaru try to get to the Moonlight Tower by the shortcut Kazuma's dad used to take as a child and lose their way.
161	"Kisuke Becomes a Mama"	November 1, 1999
Kisuke warms an egg he found by a pond and the hatched chicks think Kisuke is their mother. Kisuke raises the chicks, but their real mother show up.
162	"The Pudding Way"	November 2, 1999
Ojarumaru teaches Kobayashi Tea the right way of eating pudding.
163	"Sound Play"	November 3, 1999
Ojarumaru gets into playing with sound.
164	"The Youth Mikoshi"	November 4, 1999
The youth in Moonlight Town gather and form a Mikoshi for a festival. They finish it and carry it around the town, but cat gangs attack them.
165	"Tsukkii's Return Home"	November 5, 1999
Kin-chan's dad gives Kin-chan a mecha-dinosaur, and Kin-chan loses Tsukkii at the Moonlight Pond. Kin-chan misses Tsukii so much, he goes back to look for it.
166	"Cold Tessai Dating"	November 8, 1999
Cold Tessai goes out on a date with Usui.
167	"Mama is a Literary Master"	November 9, 1999
Ai learns her old classmate in high school had her book published, and gets motivated to write.
168	"N/A"	November 10, 1999
Kazuma's parents over who Kazuma looks like and try to find out.
169	"Cow Comes"	November 11, 1999
Cow comes to visit Ojarumaru with the help of the witch in the forest. Cow gets to give a gift to Ojarumaru, but it leaves before Ojarumaru gets to feed pudding to it.
170	"N/A"	November 12, 1999
Ojarumaru points out that Kisuke has been treated unfairly in the Oni Child Trio and the oni try to fix things.
171	"The Good Scent Trip"	November 15, 1999
Ojarumaru goes out to the town to smell different scents and ends up at Tommy's house.
172	"Viva! Sumo Wrestling"	November 16, 1999
The kids do a sumo wrestling tournament. Kin-chan and Aobee fight a good final.
173	"The Night of Moonlight Town"	November 17, 1999
Honda-sensei, the Haunted House Director, and Mr. Kawakami make rounds of Moonlight Town at night and find out a moonlight is happening.
174	"Ojaru and the Mechanical Doll"	November 18, 1999
Tommy sends the Mechanical Ojaru Doll to Kazuma's house, and Ojarumaru and the doll make friends with each other.
175	"N/A"	November 19, 1999
Kazuma's family go to a newly-opened hand-rotary sushi bar, and Ojarumaru can't get pudding.
176	"The Twin Dogs' Hobby"	November 22, 1999
Nikorinbou's secret hobby which is to collect tiny things is revealed. Then Nikorinbou finds out Okorinbou's secret hobby.
177	"Iwashimizu-kun Loosens Up"	November 23, 1999
Iwashimizu's favorite pet, Kin-chan No. 28, is not well. He finds out the reason is because he's too strict on people at school, so he tries to loosen up.
178	"Yoshiko Continued Waiting"	November 24, 1999
Yoshiko tells kids her old stories while Ojarumaru suspects she made them all up.
179	"Kame-Tome: The Secret of Energy"	November 25, 1999
Kame and Tome reveal the secret to longevity.
180	"Ojaru Returns to the Heian Era"	November 26, 1999
Kazuma gets a fever and a worried Ojarumaru goes back to the Heian era and looks for a medicinal plant with Cow.

=== Series 3 (2000) ===
No.	Title	Original release date
181	"N/A"	April 3, 2000
While picking at the radio, Ojarumaru accidentally switches it on. He thinks the radio starts talking to him and tries to answer nonsense to it. Then, he shows off difficult words he learned from the radio without knowing their meanings.
182	"Poverty-chan Participates in the Club"	April 4, 2000
Povery-chan is a member of the Tiny Things Club, but nobody sees it to attend the meeting. Other members manage to take the god out, but they are sick and tired of hearing its ongoing complaints.
183	"N/A"	April 5, 2000
Tommy believes there used to be an oni in Moonlight Town. He digs up holes to find the remains. When the Oni Child Trio come up for Ojarumaru's scepter, a hot spring is found and everybody enjoys outside hot spa together.
184	"Rainy Moonlight Town"	April 6, 2000
Ojarumaru brings an umbrella to Kazuma. He goes back home on Kazuma's back, but complains he gets wet as he does not like water. However, soon he finds it is very interesting to listen to the sound of rain and watch a rainbow in the sky.
185	"Momoman"	April 7, 2000
At the bookstore, Ojarumaru is reading books without buying one. The shopkeeper comes to throw him out, but is absorbed in the prince's revised story of a famous Momotarō.
186	"Denbo Hachirō Turns Up"	April 10, 2000
Denbo takes a leave and his grandfather comes up to serve Ojarumaru. The grandfather is 108 years old and instead of taking care of Ojarumaru, he needs Ojarumaru's special assistance to do anything.
187	"Ms. Marie and the Roomer"	April 11, 2000
Marie's borders are all strange people. Every time she goes to collect the rent, she ends up in helping them out of troubles.
188	"Mama's Smile"	April 12, 2000
Kin-chan's dad wishes secretly that Kin-chan says, "I want to be like dad." His wish has not been materialized yet. Then, Kin-chan's mom gets cold and Kin-chan's dad prepares a meal for the family with clumsy hands. Kin-chan wants to be like his dad and tries to help him, only makes things worse!
189	"Kazuma Sends a Rock"	April 13, 2000
A little girl, Yuri, likes stones as Kazuma does. She comes to tell Kazuma that she is moving out of town today. She brings her stones to Kazuma. Touched, Kazuma gives out his precious rock to the girl.
190	"N/A"	April 14, 2000
Ken gets a part-time job at a stone dealer. He proves he has genius skills in stone curving! Fluttered, he curves many stones. His works cause many problems as they look so real.
191	"The Tofu, the Pudding, and Ojarumaru"	April 17, 2000
Ojarumaru helps Ai to make tofu. He finds the bowl of tofu is bigger than a pudding cup. He eats all the tofu and asks Ai to fill the bowl with pudding. But, he has eaten much tofu and he can not taste a spoonful of pudding!
192	"Café Short Rest's Best, Long Day"	April 18, 2000
Strange friends of Ojarumaru come up to Café Short Rest one after another. The master, Mike, wonders what is going on today.
193	"N/A"	April 19, 2000
Cold Tessai gets his own fortune-telling: "If he saves two turtles, he will get wonderful present." Excited, Cold Tessai saves Kame and Tome from the Oni Child Trio. He gets their hot kisses 1101 times, the same number of their ages. Bah...!!
194	"Hoshino Once Again"	April 20, 2000
The Hoshino Family, the alien invaders come back. They force landed in Tommy's garden because of rain. The Oni Child Trio become friends to the Hoshino Family as both groups have the same enemy - Ojarumaru.
195	"The Guardian Dogs Repair the Mangan Shrine"	April 21, 2000
When Okorinbou and Nikorinbou repair the floor broken by Ojarumaru, they find a treasure map. After tremendous efforts, they finally find the treasure box. In the box, there are repair tools and a letter from god: "Repair the shrine with the tools here."
196	"Marie Tells a Lie"	April 24, 2000
Mike of Café Short Rest tells the love story of Tommy and two sisters, Marie and Sally. Marie loved Tommy so much, but she lied to him as she wanted Sally to marry him.
197	"Dangerous Love"	April 25, 2000
Denbo falls in love with Ruriko the chameleon. Ruriko is touched by Denbo's kindness, but it is difficult to overcome temptation to swallow him. So, she decides to leave him.
198	"Ms. Usui in the Cap"	April 26, 2000
Usui slips into Ojarumaru's cap. It is the world of another dimension. She is shocked to meet funny-looking men. And they propose her one after another!
199	"Ojaru Entertains Ukkun"	April 27, 2000
Oshino is selling goods by entertaining people with his speaking ventriloquism doll called Ukkun. Ojarumaru thinks Ukkun is a human and invites him to his home.
200	"Marie and Yoshiko"	April 28, 2000
Marie and Yoshiko are the classmates at their high school. They know many precious items are stored in the cellar of Yoshiko's house. They finds second button of Tommy's jacket there. Marie asked Yoshiko to keep it here for the memory of her love to Tommy.
201	"Inside Marie's Hat"	May 1, 2000
Marie never takes her hat off. Ojarumaru and his friends wonder what is in her hat. They follow her to find a chance to let her take it off.
202	"Go Forward, Easy-going Vehicle"	May 2, 2000
Ojarumaru wants to ride a bicycle, but his legs too short to reach the pedals. Feeling pity, Tommy gives him a tricycle. Ojarumaru is excited, but disappointed a moment later as he thinks it moves automatically.
203	"Asa-chan's Night"	May 3, 2000
Ojarumaru likes the moon at night and Asako loves the sun in the morning. A dispute begins between the prince and Asako. All other friends agree to have the prince's lecture about the moon. It ends finally when the morning sun comes up.
204	"Kisuke Finds"	May 4, 2000
Kisuke finds a baby of an animal. He likes to take care of them and forgets his job to take back the scepter of Great King Enma.
205	"Ojamaro-kun"	May 5, 2000
A mysterious big shot called Mr. Maeda appears in Moonlight Town. His weak point is to call everybody's name inaccurately. Ojarumaru tries hard to make Mr. Maeda to pronounce his name correctly.
206	"N/A"	May 8, 2000
Ojarumaru visits Marie's boarding house. He likes to peep borders' rooms through the key holes of doors. Denbo tries to stop him, but doesn't listen.
207	"Kazuma Raises Children"	May 9, 2000
One of Denbo's family brings a baby to Kazuma's house. Everybody gets nervous to take care of the baby. Only Kazuma is very good at look after it.
208	"The Airy Objects"	May 10, 2000
When Ojarumaru stays at home, three balloons, red, blue and yellow, drift in. He is glad to play with them, one with a laughing face, the second one with a crying face and the last one with an angry face. He talks to the balloons and guides them in the house.
209	"My Day Off"	May 11, 2000
Ojarumaru envies when he sees other people playing around and relaxing on the weekend. Tommy tells him if he works, he will get a nice weekend.
210	"Scoop vs Tsukkii"	May 12, 2000
A cameraman called Mr. Scoop comes to hunt Tsukkii for his big news. Ojarumaru and his friends are afraid Tsukkii might be taken away. So, they plan to cheat the cameraman.
211	"Scoop vs Denbo"	May 15, 2000
Mr. Scoop comes back to catch Denbo this time. Ojarumaru and his friends get together once again to hide Denbo.
212	"Ojaru Unites"	May 16, 2000
Playing run-and-chase, Ojarumaru and the Oni Child Trio jump on Tsukkii. Tsukkii does not move away from the bank of pond. It begins sinking...!
213	"Tazan's One-man Exhibition"	May 17, 2000
A ceramist, Tazan, is very shy. He plans to have an exhibition of his own works, but because of shyness, he sets up the exhibition site deep in the mountain. Ojarumaru and his friends have hard time finding it.
214	"Pressing Moonlight Mushroom"	May 18, 2000
Usui picks up a Moonlight mushroom with Mr. Kanbutsu. She dries it out and presses on the color paper. Mr. Kanbutsu is touched by her artistic sense and tells her to paste more and more...
215	"Okame Day"	May 19, 2000
Princess Okame sets up "the day to give hand-made snack to the person you love." She makes Ojarumaru's favorite snack, roasted beans, and brings them to Moonlight Town. Her idea called "Okame Day" spreads out over the whole town.
216	"Okame Tastes Candy"	May 22, 2000
Princess Okame makes pudding for Ojarumaru's dessert. She tries and tries but the prince does not say good. When Kin-chan consoles her with half-melted candy, she gets a good idea.
217	"Rainy Day Dengon"	May 23, 2000
On a rainy day, Ojarumaru and his friends start playing Dengon. The Oni Child Trio challenge the prince and his team.
218	"Denbo and the Kuri"	May 24, 2000
Denbo falls in love with Kurumi the chestnut. He takes Kurumi out of the burr where chestnuts brothers are always quarreling.
219	"Iwashimizu Doing Apprenticeship"	May 25, 2000
Iwashimizu becomes an apprentice of Coffee Mask. He wants to be a true hero, but he learns only the subdued and restrained way of behaviors.
220	"Enma Becomes Akane"	May 26, 2000
Great King Enma switches his body with Akane's in order to take his scepter back. But, the timing is not good. Green Oni who is in love with Akane comes up to confess his love to Akane!
221	"Laughing God of Poverty"	May 29, 2000
Poverty-chan gets sick and lies in bed. Meanwhile the Mangan Shrine becomes clean and shining. Okorinbou and Nikorinbou are looking for a god who can cure Poverty-chan.
222	"The Twin Dogs Breakup"	May 30, 2000
Okorinbou is invited by a rich man to live in a big mansion. He breaks up with Nikorinbou and moves to the rich man's house.
223	"The Backpack, Breaks"	May 31, 2000
Kazuma's backpack is the driving seat of Ojarumaru. Kazuma carries the prince sitting on it always. Then, the backpack is broken, and Kazuma and Kin-chan rack their brain to find out the best way to carry the prince.
224	"Oshino vs Hoshino"	June 1, 2000
Hoshino meets Oshino the salesman. Hoshino has no emotion and shows no interest to the thing Oshino wants to sell. Oshino desperately explains how marvelous it is.
225	"Face Contest"	June 2, 2000
Ojarumaru and Kin-chan play "Outstare the Opponent". The game gets escalated and their faces becomes too deformed to go back to normal!
226	"Stuffed Life"	October 2, 2000
The Oni Child Trio's tent is full of their costumes for disguise. They give the old costumes out for recycling. Suddenly, Moonlight Town looks like the site of a big costume party!
227	"The Lost Scepter"	October 3, 2000
The scepter worries about Great King Enma, who can not give verdicts to the deceased. It decides to go back to Great King Enma. It feels happy to assist Great King Enma at the beginning, but it is at a loss when Ojarumaru cuts in with nonsense.
228	"The Heian Era Hawaiian Land"	October 4, 2000
Denbo goes to a hot spa resort on holidays. He tells Ojarumaru how wonderful the resort was. The prince gets sulky to hear it. Denbo goes away to the resort again and the prince feels lonely.
229	"Scoop vs the Oni Child"	October 5, 2000
Mr. Scoop the cameraman comes back. He fixes his eyes on the Oni Child Trio. Ojarumaru and his friends have hard time to hide the three oni kids, Kisuke, Akane and Aobee from Scoop.
230	"N/A"	October 6, 2000
Tommy weighs the Oni Child Trio with the scales used for vegetables. Ojarumaru asks Tommy to weigh him in the same scales, in competition with the Oni Child Trio.
231	"N/A"	October 9, 2000
Tommy makes too many windup mechanical dolls. So, he makes anew mechanical doll to take care of other dolls. But, this dolls works too quick and snappy in winding up the springs of other dolls. Tommy gets much busier than before!
232	"Viva! Pebble"	October 10, 2000
Komachi's new hobby is collecting pretty stones. All of a sudden it becomes a boom in Moonlight Town. Only Kazuma is not excited as he has been collecting stones for a long time.
233	"Scoop vs the Scepter"	October 11, 2000
The new target of Mr. Scoop is the scepter of Great King Enma. Everybody is involved in hiding it from Scoop.
234	"Scoop vs the Twin Dogs"	October 12, 2000
Now Mr. Scoop turns his eyes on the twin guardian dogs of Mangan Shrine. Everybody, gather round! Ojarumaru and his friend helps each other to save Okorinbou and Nikorinbou.
235	"The Tiny Holes"	October 13, 2000
Nikorinbou wants to join the Tiny Things Club and breaks up Okorinbou. Ojarumaru asks Nikorinbou to get through small holes one after another.
236	"The Tiny Things Club Secret Base"	October 16, 2000
The Tiny Things Club needs a secret place where members can speak out complaints and frustration freely. They check out various places recommended by members, but one is too small. The other place is too high on the tree for Ojarumaru, the chairman, to climb up.
237	"Looking For Kimi-chan's Stars"	October 17, 2000
Kimi-chan the fortuneteller loses her power to prove her words right. The stars on her back disappear! The members of the Tiny Club go out to find the stars.
238	"The Moonlight Town Song"	October 18, 2000
The competition to choose the town song of Moonlight Town is held. Folks sings their songs on the stage. Ojarumaru overhears Kisuke singing a song and imitates it on the stage.
239	"Ojaru's Tears"	October 19, 2000
Cold Tessai foresees Ojarumaru crying by his fortune telling. He wants to protect the prince and follows wherever the prince goes.
240	"N/A"	October 20, 2000
Ojarumaru learns that Kazuma received a testimonial. He plans that the Tiny Things Club gives the testimonial to people who are helpful to the club. But, nobody takes it willingly....
241	"There's Not Enough Praise"	October 23, 2000
Ojarumaru sees Kazuma is receiving compliments. He wants to get compliments and forces Denbo and all his friends to give flutters to him.
242	"N/A"	October 24, 2000
Honda-sensei the teacher is a serious guy. He decides to build up strong body to protect Asako in need of time. Unfortunately, he trains too much and his body becomes too solid to move! He can not move at all!
243	"Oja Snow Princess and the 6 Tiny Kimono People"	October 25, 2000
A little snow princess played by Ojarumaru is shocked to receive the God of Poverty from the evil queen played by Great King Enma. Denbo passes by and tries to help the princess from poverty...
244	"Kazuma Stone"	October 26, 2000
Kazuma enters into Ojarumaru's cap. He turns into a small stone and wanders in the strange world.
245	"Mama Becomes an Actress"	October 27, 2000
Ai wants to be an actress and begins practicing a role of evil woman while she is doing house works. Ojarumaru and Ai's family are scared of her malicious attitude.
246	"The Poem Reading Battle"	October 30, 2000
Kisuke's poem is praised by the famous poet. Ojarumaru makes one poem after another but cannot beat Kisuke's poem.
247	"Akane to London"	October 31, 2000
Ballet dancer, Otome-sensi, says that Akane has good talent in ballet dancing. Akane is worried about her mission to take back the scepter. She is getting better and is invited to practice in London.
248	"The God of Poverty Drank Coffee"	November 1, 2000
Ojarumaru tells Poverty-chan how tasty the coffee is. Poverty-chan makes up its mind to try coffee at Café Short Rest.
249	"Viva! Shiritori"	November 2, 2000
Komachi is absorbed in playing shiritori. It becomes instant boom in Moonlight Town as usual. She always starts the bell on anything.
250	"N/A"	November 3, 2000
Ojarumaru finds a Heian Bird in the rooftop garden of Mr. Sakata's mansion. It is believed the bird had become extinct a long time ago. The Heian Bird was very adventurous it is elegantly slow and quiet now.
251	"Ojaru Reads Minds"	November 6, 2000
Denbo is captured by the Oni Child Trio! The Oni Child Trio proposes Ojarumaru to exchange Denbo with the scepter. But, the prince does not appear. Denbo is afraid that the prince might forget to help him.
252	"Denbo Grumbles Again"	November 7, 2000
Denbo gets drunk after eating a brandy cake. He starts complains about Ojarumaru in front of his own master!
253	"Ojaru Forgets About His Parents"	November 8, 2000
Kazuma draws his parents at school. Ojarumaru wants to draw his parents, too. He is shocked as he does not remember his parents' faces!
254	"Akane Betrays?"	November 9, 2000
Akane wants to cook delicious food for Aobee and Kisuke. She is secretly learning how to cook from Kazuma's mother, Ai. Then, Aobee and Kisuke misunderstand her for betrayal.
255	"Denbo Detective"	November 10, 2000
Denbo sees Kazuma's dad, Makoto, going away from home and follows him to find where he is heading. He looks suspicious. Soon, Denbo becomes a detective full of doubts and suspicion.
256	"N/A"	November 13, 2000
On a rainy day, Ojarumaru and his friends get bored and start Gesture Game. Then, the Oni Child Trio come up and the game is totally messed up.
257	"Ojaru and the Snowman"	November 14, 2000
Friends of Moonlight Town enjoys snowball battle. Ojarumaru befriends a snowman who joins his team.
258	"The Ants and Oja-Bear"	November 15, 2000
Is it a good dream or a nightmare? It depends who has it. Oja-Bear plays around all through the summer and eats up all the food of Denbo family and banbi-ants.
259	"Warashi-chan's House"	November 16, 2000
Yoshiko takes Ojarumaru and his friends to an empty house. They play with a little girl who appears from nowhere. But, should no one live in this house?
260	"The God of Poverty's Class Reunion"	November 17, 2000
Poverty-chan becomes the organizer of a class reunion of its fellow gods. Poverty-chan wants to show off as a dignified god and asks Okorinbou and Nikorinbou to pretend to be its servant dogs.
261	"Scoop vs Ojaru"	November 20, 2000
Finally, Mr. Scoop focuses his eyes on Ojarumaru. The prince is a great target of a big news! All the friends works hard to hide the prince out of the cameraman's search.
262	"N/A"	November 21, 2000
Usui is dating with Cold Tessai at Café Short Break. Mr. Kanbutsu and Ken come to have coffee, too. Usui feels all the men are hostile to each other because of her charm.
263	"N/A"	November 22, 2000
The free prayer book is installed at the Mangan Shrine. People can write anything they wish in this book. Thanks to this idea, Mangan Shrine becomes popular. In the same time the God of poverty disappears and Okorinbou thinks it is the reason of today's success.
264	"The Laid-back Way"	November 23, 2000
Ken, the free-lance worker, quits the job again. He is impressed the take-it-easy style of Ojarumaru and wants to learn the true style of relaxation from the prince.
265	"Ojaru is Late"	November 24, 2000
Ojarumaru is always late for the meetings at the Tiny Things Club. He tries make awkward excuses. Other members get angry and...
266	"Denbo and the Swallowtail Butterfly"	November 27, 2000
Denbo meets a girl worm of a butterfly. He is touched by her naivete and falls in love with her. Soon, the worm changes into a beautiful butterfly and her personality also changes into selfishness.
267	"Cow Doing an Arranged Marriage"	November 28, 2000
Cow meets Cowko for an arranged marriage. Cow is happy to accept it, but Ojarumaru finds out this is Princess Okame's plan. She expects the prince think of her more seriously. Ojarumaru gets upset and opposes this arranged marriage.
268	"Tsukkii's Smile Disappeared"	November 29, 2000
Tsukkii makes grimace and he loses one horn. Ojarumaru and his friends want him to get back a good smile. So, they dig up what happened.
269	"Street Corner"	November 30, 2000
A red dress is displayed in a show window at a corner of street. Komachi and the people of Moonlight Town are attracted to it without knowing why. It there a spell or a good charm on it?
270	"Half of This Happiness"	December 1, 2000
Ojarumaru and Kazuma have a quarrel over the orange. Ojarumaru walks out of Kazuma's house and goes to Tommy's. He wants to live with Tommy...

=== Series 4 (2001) ===
No.	Title	Original release date
271	"New Ojarumaru"	April 2, 2001
Ojarumaru goes back to the Heian era to attend the coming of age ceremony. What kind of ceremony is it?
272	"Okame Comes to Grasp"	April 3, 2001
Princess Okame finally decides to live in Moonlight Town. She is going to try to catch Ojarumaru's heart. Moreover, she lives with her rival, Komachi, because she wants to learn Komachi's secret.
273	"Ojaru Lives With the Oni Child"	April 4, 2001
Ojarumaru quarrels with Kazuma. He lost a place to stay, so he comes to the Oni Child Trio's tent.
274	"Rainy Day Usui"	April 5, 2001
On the dark rainy day, weather depressed Ojarumaru and kids, but Usui is different. She draws a cartoon very rapidly, then she thinks the cartoon is her masterpiece. But....
275	"Ojaru Exceeds the Budget"	April 6, 2001
Kazuma's backpack, which is Ojarumaru's favorite, is broken. Kazuma gets a brand new backpack, but Ojarumaru asks Kazuma to use the old one. Kazuma still uses the old one, but it is getting a hole in the bottom of the backpack...
276	"Rainy Day Old Maid"	April 9, 2001
On the rainy day, Ojarumaru, Kazuma, Usui and Cold Tessai play the Old Maid in Usui's room. They play the game with tense.
277	"The Club Swells"	April 10, 2001
The members of the Tiny Things Club gather as usual but they run out of topics to complain. The Tiny Things Club doesn't grow livelier. Besides, Katapi left for his business. The members start tailing Katapi.
278	"The Motivation Board"	April 11, 2001
Nikorinbou collapsed because she worked so hard. Okorinbou nurses Nikorinbou. Poverty-chan brings the motivation board, which absorbed somebody's motivation before. Poverty-chan gives it to Nikorinbou, then she recovers herself.
279	"Enma Gathers the Scepter"	April 12, 2001
Great King Enma couldn't get his scepter back from Ojarumaru, so he recruits a new scepter from the public. He receives many scepters. Moreover, Ojarumaru comes to see them.
280	"Okame Biyori"	April 13, 2001
Princess Okame starts helping at the Komachi Hair Salon. Her massage becomes very popular in Moonlight Town. Having a hair cut day is called an ideal day.
281	"Ojaru Revives Mike"	April 16, 2001
Mike owns a cafe, but all of sudden, he forgot how to make his special blended coffee. Ojarumaru admonishes Mike who struggles with his problem.
282	"N/A"	April 17, 2001
Yoshiko Tanaka's shops experienced many mysteries. Warashi caused the mysteries. She moved Tanaka's shop from the old mansion. Ojarumaru tries to arbitrate their quarrel....but....
283	"Denbo Detective Follows Cold Tessai"	April 18, 2001
Denbo heard that Cold Tessai said he wanted to have a girlfriend in this season. So Denbo wants to tail Cold Tessai to check his behavior.
284	"1 Good Friend!"	April 19, 2001
Finding one gray hair, Kin-chan's dad is in confusion. Kin-chan's dad tries to makeup youthful looking somehow. Kin-chan and his mom are anxious about Kin-chan's dad's behavior.
285	"Ken Competes for a Part-Time Job"	April 20, 2001
Ken and Minoru are competing for getting a part time job at the table warehouse. Only one of them can work there. Minoru loves tableware but he always misses while working.
286	"Tanaka Becomes Neat"	April 23, 2001
Yoshiko Tanaka wants to get Ojarumaru's cap. She tries to show a warrior's helmet, which is made of newspaper, and it looks great to Ojarumaru. Then she succeeds to exchange the warrior's helmet to Ojarumaru's cap. But the cap absorbs Yoshiko Tanaka and everything at her shop.
287	"Kisuke Covers Up a Mistake"	April 24, 2001
Kisuke tears the tent by his horns. He tries to fix it up secretly, but he tears it even more. So he starts looking for somebody who can fix it up.
288	"Tommy and Children"	April 25, 2001
Tommy is lonesome today because Kazuma, Ojarumaru and the Oni Child Trio can't be his company. But after he makes a windup doll, everyone comes to see him...
289	"Omomomaru"	April 26, 2001
Once upon a time, the lazy boy whose cheeks look like peach was named Omomomaru. He and his family found red, blue, and yellow peaches. When they cut the peaches, hard worker oni come out.
290	"Kisuke's Horn"	April 27, 2001
Kisuke's horn is getting wobbly. Kisuke leaves the tent and is worried he might be a chick and not like an oni...
291	"Tommy and Makoto"	April 30, 2001
Makoto visits Tommy's house to borrow some tools. Even Makoto and Tommy are a parent and a child, but they don't resemble each other at all.
292	"A Rock Love Letter"	May 1, 2001
After Yuri who loves collecting rocks transferred, she sent a package to Kazuma. She put a rock in the package and Kazuma realizes how she thinks about him. So he replies to her by a rock.
293	"Ojatsurumaru's Repayment"	May 2, 2001
Once upon a time, Kazubee who sells puddings to live was a boy. One snowy day, when he feels lonesome, Ojatsurumaru collapses by the roadside.
294	"Akemi Disappeared"	May 3, 2001
Marie and a parrot, Akemi, are best friends. One night, Akemi was aware that Marie was disturbed by nightmare. Akemi decides to ask for help and get out of the cage.
295	"The Oni Child Nursing"	May 4, 2001
Tommy catches a cold. Tommy tells the Oni Child Trio if he drinks the soup, which is made of Moonlight Grass, he recovers himself. The oni thinks they cook the soup for him because Tommy always takes care of them.
296	"The Tamura Family in the Critical Moment"	May 7, 2001
The Tamura family cleans their closet. Many old things are found from the closet, but they can't throw them away because they think they may need those old things later.
297	"The Men Couple"	May 8, 2001
When Kazuma's dad and Ojarumaru woke up, Kazuma's mom and Kazuma were not there. Dad and Ojarumaru were alone. Both of them feel uncomfortable atmosphere. Both of them wonder how soon Kazuma and mom are coming home.
298	"Papa and to the Moonlight Tower 2"	May 9, 2001
Kazuma, Ojarumaru, Kazuma's dad, Kin-chan and, Kin-chan's dad are going to the Moonlight Tower. The road, which both daddies are used to pass, reminds daddies of their childhood days.
299	"Ojaru Becomes Busy"	May 10, 2001
Ojarumaru tries to stay away from Princess Okame who often visits him. He makes up a plan and says he is busy to refuge Okame's offer.
300	"Miyoko Rock"	May 11, 2001
Kazuma is enthusiastic to polish small rocks. Ojarumaru asks him whether he names the rocks or not. Ojarumaru also mentions if those rocks are important for Kazuma, he should name the rocks. Then Kazuma tries to name one after another.
301	"Ms. Usui Becomes a Popular Person"	May 14, 2001
Usui is offered her comic will be running in a magazine, "The Very Scary Comics". It causes her to be anxious because she wants to be a cartoonist for comics for a girl. However, she experiences in the cap if she becomes a popular cartoonist and very rich....
302	"Ukkun, the True Identity is Exposed!?"	May 15, 2001
Princess Okame was refused to have a date with Ojarumaru because he was supposed to meet with Ukkun. But Ojarumaru is getting to know Ukkun is a doll.
303	"Dull Denbo"	May 16, 2001
A female Densho-Firefly, Hifumi, comes to the Moonlight Town. Hifumi lives in a neighborhood with Denbo. Secretly, Hifumi falls in love with Denbo.
304	"Otome and the Old Men"	May 17, 2001
Four old men look like a stage assistant dressed in black. Once a year, Otome-sensei plans to have a ballet recital and she calls for them.
305	"The Hoshino Family Drank Coffee"	May 18, 2001
On his way to Café Short Rest, Ojarumaru stops by the Hoshino family's house. Then he invites the Hoshino family to have a cup of coffee at Short Rest. But it is the first time for them to try café and coffee, so they are very excited.
306	"Usui: The Speech Crash Course"	May 21, 2001
Usui consults with Ojarumaru how to speak with Mr. Kanbutsu who invites her to dinner.
307	"Papa Returns to His Parents' Home"	May 22, 2001
10 years after married, Kazuma's dad confessed he is the man who add source into curry rice. Kazuma's mom tells him he is weird then they start having a quarrel. Finally, Kazuma's dad leaves their house.
308	"N/A"	May 23, 2001
Cold Tessai met his parents' home's maid coincidentally. After he left his home, his mother becomes sick. Then he goes home to see his mother. It has been 10 years after Cold Tessai ran away from home.
309	"The Poverty-chan Festival"	May 24, 2001
Okorinbou and Nikorinbou are distressed because they can't collect monetary offering. Ojarumaru suggested to them to have a festival for Poverty-chan.
310	"Fan Club, Fan Club"	May 25, 2001
Nikorinbou works hard for the Tiny Things Club. She tries to collect the monetary offering for the Mangan Shrine and also for the Tiny Things Club. Then she collapses.
311	"Small Ojarumaru"	May 28, 2001
Ojarumaru finds Denbo eating pudding. Ojarumaru thinks if he becomes small like Denbo, he can eat much amount of pudding. So, he wishes he could be smaller and smaller and then he enters in the cap.
312	"Beautiful Trash"	May 29, 2001
Coffee Mask cleans Moonlight Town. He starts sweeping fallen leaves at the Mangan Shrine. But Poverty-chan asks him to leave it.
313	"The Small and Yet Admirable Ojarumaru"	May 30, 2001
Kazuma told Ojarumaru that Ojarumaru is a great because he doesn't say he wants to meet his parents even he is young. Ojarumaru wants everyone to admire him.
314	"Run, Kazuma"	May 31, 2001
Kazuma is enthusiastic to practice running for the marathon. Ojarumaru asks him whether he likes Ojarumaru or the marathon. Then Ojarumaru has the sulk and follows Kazuma while he is practicing.
315	"Ojaru Gives Parents to Ukkun"	June 1, 2001
Ojarumaru tells Oshino that he wants to meet Ukkun's mother. Oshino stays up late and makes Ukkun's mother and practices her voice. But the next day, Ojarumaru tells him that he wants to meet Ukkun's father.
316	"Kimi-chan: Introduction to the Trio"	October 1, 2001
Kimi-chan wants to become a pupil of the Oni Child Trio, but she thinks everything can't go the way she wants it. Ojarumaru interprets for Kimi-chan.
317	"N/A"	October 2, 2001
Kazuma and Yuri write letters each other, but Ojarumaru found out they didn't talk about him at all in their letters. After he knows it, he has the sulk. So Ojarumaru decides to write a letter for Yuri.
318	"Ojaru Returns the Scepter"	October 3, 2001
The Oni Child Trio fails the United in front of Ojarumaru. They try to unite several times because Ojarumaru tells them it didn't look as usual. Eventually, when they succeed to unite, Ojarumaru prepares a reward for them...
319	"Denboko"	October 4, 2001
A female Densho-Firefly, Denboko, looks like Denbo. She makes Ojarumaru confused.
320	"The 3 Piece Set Running"	October 5, 2001
Ojarumaru's three important pieces for relaxing have broken down. He brings them to Tommy to fix them up but....
321	"N/A"	October 8, 2001
Princess Okame and Denboko carry a trick out to catch Ojarumaru's heart.
322	"Nikobou Builds a Doghouse"	October 9, 2001
Nikorinbou longs for having a doghouse. She starts making her own doghouse. Okorinbou opposes to Nikorinbou and he insists she doesn't have pride as a guardian dog.
323	"Enma Becomes Aobee"	October 10, 2001
The awful wife of Great King Enma asked him to take care of the death people. He decides to get his scepter back from Ojarumaru. He comes to the Moonlight Town and switches himself with Aobee.
324	"The Alone But Not Lonely Director"	October 11, 2001
The Haunted House Director says he never feels lonesome, even though he is at the house alone because there are so many invisible friends...
325	"Kame-Tome Scouting"	October 12, 2001
Yoshiko Tanaka recruits the Kame and Tome sisters. She tells them to be displayed for her shop as an antique...
326	"There's Not Enough Conversation"	October 15, 2001
Kazuma can't be Ojarumaru's company because he has to do his homework. So Ojarumaru gets bored and he bothers Makoto and Ai.
327	"King Ojaru's Sadness"	October 16, 2001
Ojarumaru sees a hat of a cook and he wants to have a cap with more height. He wishes for a cap that could be higher and then he enters into it.
328	"Kimi-chan's Tail is Extending"	October 17, 2001
Kimi-chan is worried about her tail being very short. She can't tell fortunes after she starts thinking about it.
329	"The Cartoon-character Costume Way"	October 18, 2001
Ojarumaru saw Ken, who dresses up in a costume. But Ojarumaru points out Ken isn't suitable for this job. Ojarumaru orders the Oni Child Trio to train Ken.
330	"N/A"	October 19, 2001
Denbo falls in love with a little fish in a fish tank. But the fish tank is...
331	"Viva! The Moonlight Town Girls Club"	October 22, 2001
Everyone says the Tiny Things Club doesn't get in swing... On the other hand, the Girl's Club is organized. The Girl's Club is getting in swing and a Tiny Things Club member thinks...
332	"Ojarumaru Waits for Papa"	October 23, 2001
Ojarumaru envies Kazuma is always admired because he helps with housework. Ojarumaru tries to help, but he can't do it well.
333	"The Exchange Diary of Love"	October 24, 2001
Princess Okame wants to be more close to Ojarumaru. She gives Ojarumaru a personal diary, but...he doesn't want to write in it. So he replaces another person to write in the diary....
334	"Walking Denbo"	October 25, 2001
All of a sudden, Denbo can't spread his wings. He tries to take care of Ojarumaru by walking.
335	"Mr. Shōshin Came Back"	October 26, 2001
A policeman, Mr. Shōshin, who doubts persons easily, comes back to Moonlight Town. He is worried about the people in Moonlight Town because the residences always tell a lie. But...
336	"Viva! Feeding"	October 29, 2001
Komachi feeds fish in the pond of the park. It becomes a boom in Moonlight Town.
337	"Camping at the Kin-chan House"	October 30, 2001
Kin-chan and his friends decide to camp at Kin-chan's backyard, but his dad and mom are worried.
338	"Oko-Niko Grows a Flower"	October 31, 2001
Okorinbou and Nikorinbou found a bud of a flower at the Mangan Shrine. They think this is a herald of a good thing. So they start taking care of it.
339	"Peach Ball Fighter, Momotamā"	November 1, 2001
Momotamā, who was born from a peach, becomes a peach ball player. Then he confronts a crisis for grandma and grandpa.
340	"Denbo Detective Chases Otome"	November 2, 2001
Denbo Detective follows Otome-sensei. Otome-sensei enters a noodle restaurant...
341	"Ocharumaru"	November 5, 2001
Ojarumaru makes a slip of tongue. The Oni Child Trio and others tease him so much. Ojarumaru cries and everyone apologizes to him but...
342	"The Chonmage of Love"	November 6, 2001
Hoshino's father is thinking what he presents to Hoshino's mother as an anniversary gift. Hoshino's mother also thinks..
343	"Ojaru Disappeared"	November 7, 2001
After Ojarumaru quarreled with Kazuma, he hides himself in the backyard of Kin-chan. Denbo and Kazuma follow him but...
344	"Kin-chan Recites a Song"	November 8, 2001
Ojarumaru teaches song lyrics. Kin-chan sings much kind of lyrics about Tsukkii.
345	"Denboko Scolds"	November 9, 2001
Denboko scolds everybody.
346	"Ojaru Grips"	November 12, 2001
Ojarumaru feels Kin-chan's gripping power and Kazuma's gripping power are different when they shake a hand. Then Ojarumaru starts shaking hands of anybody.
347	"Denbo Gets Stuck"	November 13, 2001
Denbo is stuck between the walls. He tries to get a help but....
348	"N/A"	November 14, 2001
The Haunted House Director decides to hire a part time job worker, Akiko. Then he experiences nervousness for the first time.
349	"Ms. Usui's Teabags"	November 15, 2001
Coffee Mask and Japanese Tea Mask come to let Usui taste a cup of light tea.
350	"Kame-Tome Get Jealous"	November 16, 2001
Tommy, who wears a colorful sweater, hangs out with young girls. Kame and Tome get jealous with them.
351	"Okame Calls Cow"	November 19, 2001
Princess Okame uses Cow to see Ojarumaru, but he doesn't believe it and keeps running away.
352	"The Mechanical Doll House"	November 20, 2001
Tommy collects mechanical dolls. He makes a house, which holds the dolls, but the house is also mechanism.
353	"General Winter Came"	November 21, 2001
One snowy day, General Winter comes to the Mangan Shrine. He told the guardian dogs if they are nice to him, there must be anything good going. But General Winter is very selfish.
354	"Warashi-chan and Poverty-chan"	November 22, 2001
Poverty-chan and Warashi don't have common conversations. But Poverty-chan may fall in love with Warashi.
355	"Ojaru-sama"	November 23, 2001
Ojarumaru becomes a celebrity after he got the scepter from Great King Enma. Then he is going away on a trip with Kazuma and Denbee.
356	"N/A"	November 26, 2001
Iwashimizu is struggling to find what his strong point is. Even he can't do anything; there must be something, which glitters.
357	"Papa's Business Trip"	November 27, 2001
Dad is going on a business trip for the first time. He is worried about his absence.
358	"Denbo: The Theater of Love"	November 28, 2001
Denbo and Taruko falls in love, but their parents oppose their relationship and Ojarumaru interrupts with his teasing remarks.
359	"Another Street Corner"	November 29, 2001
This is a story of Komachi who falls in love with a puppy and Mr. Kawakami falls in love with a great cloth.
360	"Denbo-sama"	November 30, 2001
Denbo gets angry with Ojarumaru because he ate Denbo's snacks. Then Denbo lets Ojarumaru make a promise to exchange the position.

=== Series 5 (2002) ===
No.	Title	Original release date
361	"N/A"	April 1, 2002
362	"Black Tea Mask"	April 2, 2002
363	"N/A"	April 3, 2002
364	"N/A"	April 4, 2002
365	"Oko-Niko Become Fortunetellers"	April 5, 2002
366	"Aka Murasaki Again"	April 8, 2002
367	"A Way to Get Back the Scepter"	April 9, 2002
368	"N/A"	April 10, 2002
369	"N/A"	April 11, 2002
370	"Viva! Unhappiness"	April 12, 2002
371	"Ojaru Disguises"	April 15, 2002
Princess Okame chases after Ojarumaru all throughout Moonlight Town. He tries to disguise himself (mainly through the Oni Child Trio's costumes), but Okame doesn't get fooled by the disguises.
372	"Hifumi-chan Again"	April 16, 2002
373	"N/A"	April 17, 2002
374	"Ukkun is a Girl?!"	April 18, 2002
375	"Tsukkii Grafitied"	April 19, 2002
376	"N/A"	April 22, 2002
Okorinbou makes an agreement with Jessica's look-alike dog, Angry Boy, to let him be with Jessica while Angry Boy goes to the Mangan Shrine. While Okorinbou enjoys being with Jessica, Angry Boy eventually realizes that being a guardian dog isn't for him.
377	"Enma Becomes Denbo"	April 23, 2002
378	"Falling Out! The Tiny Things Club"	April 24, 2002
379	"Ojaru Quits Ojaru"	April 25, 2002
380	"Ai-chan, a Dream of ESP Livelihood"	April 26, 2002
381	"Grandma Marie Wants to Mark-Up the Rent"	April 29, 2002
382	"The Drawer isn't Opening"	April 30, 2002
383	"N/A"	May 1, 2002
384	"Ken and Usui Staring at Each Other"	May 2, 2002
385	"N/A"	May 3, 2002
386	"Denbo Crying for Onigiri"	May 6, 2002
387	"N/A"	May 7, 2002
388	"N/A"	May 8, 2002
389	"N/A"	May 9, 2002
390	"Asa-chan: The Morning of a Snowy Day"	May 10, 2002
391	"N/A"	May 13, 2002
392	"N/A"	May 14, 2002
393	"Bossy Kazuma"	May 15, 2002
394	"The Day of the Moonlight Town Disguise Contest"	May 16, 2002
395	"Kazuma Dislikes"	May 17, 2002
396	"Ojaru Likes the Oni Child Trio"	May 20, 2002
397	"N/A"	May 21, 2002
398	"Akane and Ai-chan"	May 22, 2002
399	"N/A"	May 23, 2002
400	"Rainy Day Puzzle"	May 24, 2002
401	"Hoshino Wants"	May 27, 2002
402	"Poverty-chan's Bath Day"	May 28, 2002
403	"Maeda Again"	May 29, 2002
404	"N/A"	May 30, 2002
405	"Ojaru is Eager"	May 31, 2002
406	"Ojaru-Word"	October 7, 2002
407	"Ken Doesn't Want to Fall"	October 8, 2002
408	"N/A"	October 9, 2002
409	"Maririn the Typhoon"	October 10, 2002
410	"Denbo Catches a Cold"	October 11, 2002
411	"The Ojaru Observation"	October 14, 2002
412	"N/A"	October 15, 2002
413	"Kisuke Mask"	October 16, 2002
414	"The Tiny Things Club Golf Tournament"	October 17, 2002
415	"Nedzu Again?"	October 18, 2002
416	"Kame-Tome Fight"	October 21, 2002
417	"Ojaru House"	October 22, 2002
418	"The Moonlight Town Round-table Discussion"	October 23, 2002
419	"Farewell, Warashi"	October 24, 2002
420	"Kazuma and Aobee"	October 25, 2002
421	"Katapi and Francois"	October 28, 2002
422	"Kazuma's Behind Face"	October 29, 2002
423	"Kanae"	October 30, 2002
424	"N/A"	October 31, 2002
425	"Nedzu Once Again?"	November 1, 2002
426	"Usui's Friend"	November 4, 2002
427	"The Coming Night of the Dancing Star"	November 5, 2002
428	"Makoto Goes to the Super"	November 6, 2002
429	"A Gift from a Obake"	November 7, 2002
430	"N/A"	November 8, 2002
431	"Mr. Shōshin's Major Incident"	November 11, 2002
432	"Denbo Misunderstanding"	November 12, 2002
433	"Giving Up Oko-Niko"	November 13, 2002
434	"N/A"	November 14, 2002
435	"N/A"	November 15, 2002
436	"Amaenbo Tommy"	November 18, 2002
437	"Yoshiko Tanaka's Dried Persimmons"	November 19, 2002
438	"Oja-Mansion and Townspeople"	November 20, 2002
439	"N/A"	November 21, 2002
440	"N/A"	November 22, 2002
441	"Ojaru Slackens Even More"	November 25, 2002
442	"Nedzu Runs"	November 26, 2002
443	"N/A"	November 27, 2002
444	"The Mechanical Music Doll"	November 28, 2002
445	"Kanae's Wish"	November 29, 2002
446	"Replaced"	December 2, 2002
In order to kill time, Ojarumaru entered the cap. Everyone has been replaced by someone else in the cap.
447	"N/A"	3 December 2002
448	"Poverty-chan's Song"	4 December 2002
449	"Kanae and Hoshino"	5 December 2002
450	"N/A"	6 December 2002

=== Series 6 (2003) ===
No.	Title	Original release date
451	"It's Moonlight Town, Mother"	April 7, 2003
452	"Okame Fed Up"	April 8, 2003
453	"The Oni Child Trains"	April 9, 2003
454	"Nedzu Runs at Full Speed"	April 10, 2003
455	"Kazuma Wants That Rock"	April 11, 2003
456	"N/A"	April 14, 2003
457	"Denboko Gets Caught"	April 15, 2003
458	"Usui: News From Hometown"	April 16, 2003
459	"When Did You Take the Family Photos?"	April 17, 2003
460	"The Mechanical Commentary Doll"	April 18, 2003
461	"Papas"	April 21, 2003
462	"The Treasure Chest isn't Opening"	April 22, 2003
463	"Denbo and Rika"	April 23, 2003
464	"Halted Honda-sensei"	April 24, 2003
465	"The 101 Denbos"	April 25, 2003
466	"N/A"	April 28, 2003
467	"N/A"	April 29, 2003
468	"Ojarumaru Masters Kindness"	April 30, 2003
469	"Gyoza Party"	May 1, 2003
470	"N/A"	May 2, 2003
471	"Moonlight Town Whimsical Walk"	May 5, 2003
472	"Uncle's Repayment"	May 6, 3003
473	"N/A"	May 7, 2003
474	"Mr. Kawakami's Laid-back Day"	May 8, 2003
475	"Usui Breaks a Pen"	May 9, 2003
476	"Kazuma Becomes a Bad Child"	May 12, 2003
477	"Usui's Album"	May 13, 2003
478	"The Moonlight Hot Spring"	May 14, 2003
479	"The Oni Child Trio Decides at 9:05"	May 15, 2003
480	"N/A"	May 16, 2003
481	"Fuwarinbou"	May 19, 2003
482	"N/A"	May 20, 2003
483	"Denbo's Different Life"	May 21, 2003
484	"Enma Becomes Denboko"	May 22, 2003
485	"The Oni Child's Move"	May 23, 2003
486	"N/A"	May 26, 2003
487	"The Old Man and the Turtles"	May 27, 2003
488	"Enma Test"	May 28, 2003
489	"Denbo's Long Night"	May 29, 2003
490	"N/A"	May 30, 2003
491	"The White Tuxedo"	June 2, 2003
492	"Akane Grows Fat"	June 3, 2003
493	"Ai-chan: Taste of Mom's Cooking"	June 4, 2003
494	"N/A"	June 5, 2003
495	"Kazuma, Chikuwa, and Ojarumaru"	June 6, 2003
496	"Swelling"	October 6, 2003
497	"Cafe Marie"	October 7, 2003
498	"N/A"	October 8, 2003
499	"The Mysterious Gift"	October 9, 2003
500	"Diva Marie"	October 10, 2003
501	"Various Praises"	October 14, 2003
502	"Mosquito"	October 15, 2003
503	"Rainy Day Karuta"	October 16, 2003
504	"Kanae, Tamae"	October 17, 2003
505	"Kanae and Poverty-chan"	October 20, 2003
506	"Mr. Director and Tsukkii"	October 21, 2003
507	"English"	October 22, 2003
508	"Wiping the Window"	October 23, 2003
509	"N/A"	October 24, 2003
510	"The Oni Child Wears Makoto's Clothes"	October 25, 2003
511	"Flying Soap Bubbles"	October 28, 2003
512	"Iwashimizu-kun Feels Dizzy"	October 29, 2003
513	"Green Oni in the Cap"	October 30, 2003
514	"Oja Riding Hood"	October 31, 2003
515	"Tsukkii in a Log Cabin"	November 3, 2003
516	"Hoshino vs Yoshiko"	November 4, 2003
517	"The Tamura Family Prepares For a Journey"	November 5, 2003
518	"Welcome Home"	November 6, 2003
519	"During the Night and the Morning"	November 7, 2003
520	"Fake Pudding"	November 10, 2003
521	"N/A"	November 11, 2003
522	"Poverty Tent"	November 12, 2003
523	"The Tamura Family Can't Remember"	November 13, 2003
524	"Ojaruko-chan"	November 14, 2003
525	"Denbo Becomes Strict"	November 17, 2003
526	"Palm Reader Day"	November 18, 2003
527	"Kisuke's Love"	November 19, 2003
528	"Fake Ojaru"	November 20, 2003
529	"The Moonlight Town Tiny, Tiny Things Club"	November 21, 2003
530	"Ojarumaru and the Grasshopper"	November 24, 2003
531	"Haiku Classroom, Japanese Tea Classroom"	November 25, 2003
532	"N/A"	November 26, 2003
533	"Stuck Again"	November 27, 2003
534	"N/A"	November 28, 2003
535	"The Moonlight Town Quiz Tournament"	December 1, 2003
536	"The Great Effort Caterpillar"	December 2, 2003
537	"Whose Wish?"	December 3, 2003
538	"Enma and the Scepter"	December 4, 2003
539	"Catch Ball"	December 5, 2003
540	"The Other Side of the Puddle"	December 8, 2003

=== Series 7 (2004) ===
No.	Title	Original release date
541	"Enma, Becomes the Scepter"	April 5, 2004
542	"The Tiny, Tiny Things Club Race"	April 6, 2004
543	"Denbo's Room"	April 7, 2004
544	"N/A"	April 8, 2004
545	"Usui Receives a Yonkoma"	April 9, 2004
546	"Stopping at Each Floor"	April 12, 2004
547	"Tanaka Stays in Bed"	April 13, 2004
548	"N/A"	April 14, 2004
549	"Hoshino, Doing a Lottery"	April 15, 2004
550	"Usui: The Yonkoma Meeting"	April 16, 2004
551	"Dig Here, Tsukkii"	April 19, 2004
552	"The Okobou Nikobou Weather Forecast"	April 20, 2004
553	"The Oni Child Feast"	April 21, 2004
554	"Sleep-talking"	April 22, 2004
555	"Usui: The Yonkoma Debuts"	April 23, 2004
556	"Ojaru's Ticket"	April 26, 2004
557	"N/A"	April 27, 2004
558	"N/A"	April 28, 2004
559	"Kame-Tome, Talk About Men"	April 29, 2004
560	"Ms. Marie's Butler"	April 30, 2004
561	"The Great Skipping Strategy"	May 3, 2004
562	"Enma-Papa Comes"	May 4, 2004
563	"Honda-sensei Keeps on Running"	May 5, 2004
564	"Hide-and-seek"	May 6, 2004
565	"Mecha Denbo Takeoff"	May 7, 2004
566	"The Mustache and Otome"	May 10, 2004
567	"Akane, Leaves the House"	May 11, 2004
568	"Denbo Sticks onto Kin-chan's Candy"	May 12, 2004
569	"Snowstorm Tea Journey"	May 13, 2004
570	"Aobee Transforms"	May 14, 2004
571	"Ojaru Steps on Gum"	May 17, 2004
572	"Straying the Map"	May 18, 2004
573	"Ken and Gen"	May 19, 2004
574	"The Oni Child and the Horizontal Bar"	May 20, 2004
575	"Infiltrate! The Girls Club"	May 21, 2004
576	"Ken Catches a Ghost"	May 24, 2004
577	"N/A"	May 25, 2004
578	"Farewell, Okame"	May 26, 2004
579	"The Old Men's Capsule"	May 27, 2004
580	"Mama Becomes Denbo"	May 28, 2004
581	"The Lost Property"	May 31, 2004
582	"Mr. Shōshin's News From Moonlight Town"	June 1, 2004
583	"Oja Riding Hood 2"	June 2, 2004
584	"The 108th Year Proposal"	June 3, 2004
585	"N/A"	June 4, 2004
586	"Tomorrow's Iwashimizu-kun"	October 4, 2004
587	"The Tiny Things Election"	October 5, 2004
588	"Mr. Kawakami's Happy 3 Days"	October 6, 2004
589	"Great King Enma's Birthday"	October 7, 2004
590	"Fly, Cold Tessai"	October 8, 2004
591	"N/A"	October 11, 2004
592	"Cold Tessai's Long Hair"	October 12, 2004
593	"False Soup"	October 13, 2004
594	"The Tiny, Tiny Things Club Fan Club"	October 14, 2004
595	"Usui-sensei"	October 15, 2004
596	"Mr. Kanbutsu Depressed"	October 18, 2004
597	"Tea and the Mechanical Doll"	October 19, 2004
598	"The Twin Dogs Bark at the Moon"	October 20, 2004
599	"The Drawing Song"	October 21, 2004
600	"N/A"	October 22, 2004
601	"Claudia"	October 26, 2004
602	"N/A"	October 27, 2004
603	"N/A"	October 28, 2004
604	"The God of Fortune's Worry"	October 29, 2004
605	"Ai-chan is 18 Years Old"	November 1, 2004
606	"The Mobile Phones of Love"	November 2, 2004
607	"Ojaru Rolls Up His Sleeves"	November 3, 2004
608	"N/A"	November 4, 2004
609	"Run, Oni Child"	November 5, 2004
610	"Ai-chan's Yellow Dress"	November 8, 2004
611	"Treasure Hunting Game"	November 9, 2004
612	"The Audition of Marie Mansion"	November 10, 2004
613	"The Tamura Family Can't Leave From the Kotatsu"	November 11, 2004
614	"Hoshino, Gets Stuck"	November 12, 2004
615	"Tamae and Poverty-chan"	November 15, 2004
616	"Cow Doing an Arranged Marriage Again"	November 16, 2004
617	"Penguin"	November 17, 2004
618	"To the Moonlight Tower Again"	November 18, 2004
619	"Asa-chan's Bride Teaching"	November 19, 2004
620	"Ojaru, Becomes Lost"	November 22, 2004
621	"Ukkun, Okkun"	November 23, 2004
622	"Ojaru Sleeps on a Bed"	November 24, 2004
623	"Ken's Store"	November 25, 2004
624	"Father, Mother......?"	November 26, 2004
625	"Rainy Day Making a Story"	November 29, 2004
626	"Momoman 2"	November 30, 2004
627	"The Mechanical Elder Brother Doll"	December 1, 2004
628	"The Conductor"	December 2, 2004
629	"N/A"	December 3, 2004
630	"N/A"	December 6, 2004

=== Series 8 (2005) ===
No.	Title	Original release date
631	"N/A"	April 4, 2005
632	"N/A"	April 5, 2005
633	"Penguin, Penguin"	April 6, 2005
634	"Okame Photo"	April 7, 2005
635	"Enma's Cradle"	April 8, 2005
636	"Poverty-chan's Tooth Brushing Day"	April 11, 2005
637	"N/A"	April 12, 2005
638	"To Deliver a Bento"	April 13, 2005
639	"N/A"	April 14, 2005
640	"Tree Tsukkī"	April 15, 2005
641	"The Person Like an Oni"	April 18, 2005
642	"Formation〜 Boy's Club"	April 19, 2005
643	"N/A"	April 20, 2005
644	"N/A"	April 21, 2005
645	"Coffee Mask and Mike"	April 22, 2005
646	"Kappa"	April 25, 2005
647	"The Tamura Family's Air Conditioner is Broken"	April 26, 2005
648	"Kame in Tome with Tome in Kame"	April 27, 2005
649	"Mazuka"	April 28, 2005
650	"The Oni Child Anniversary"	April 29, 2005
651	"Ai-chan's Project P"	May 2, 2005
652	"Tommy Museum"	May 3, 2005
653	"Ojaru Hand"	May 4, 2005
654	"N/A"	May 5, 2005
655	"Ai-chan, Savings Plan"	May 6, 2005
656	"Tamae's Strength"	May 9, 2005
657	"N/A"	May 10, 2005
658	"N/A"	May 11, 2005
659	"Crisis Management"	May 12, 2005
660	"The Long Chair"	May 13, 2005
661	"Ojaru Swims"	May 16, 2005
662	"Spirit of the Spring"	May 17, 2005
663	"The Wonderful Goat"	May 18, 2005
664	"I'm Not Pleased"	May 19, 2005
665	"N/A"	May 20, 2005
666	"Whose Dream?"	May 23, 2005
667	"N/A"	May 24, 2005
668	"Aim at the Idol"	May 25, 2005
669	"Oko-Niko Invites"	May 26, 2005
670	"Denbo and Neon"	May 27, 2005
671	"Katapi Returns to His Hometown"	May 30, 2005
672	"N/A"	May 31, 2005
673	"N/A"	June 1, 2005
674	"Moyako"	June 2, 2005
675	"Marie Basket"	June 3, 2005
676	"The Song of Tsukkii"	October 3, 2005
677	"Ken in the Cap"	October 4, 2005
678	"N/A"	October 5, 2005
679	"N/A"	October 6, 2005
680	"Huge"	October 7, 2005
681	"Hoshino, Smiles"	October 10, 2005
682	"Chikuwa 2"	October 11, 2005
683	"N/A"	October 12, 2005
684	"Fairy Girl"	October 13, 2005
685	"Curtain"	October 14, 2005
686	"Blue, Red, Yellow, Ken"	October 17, 2005
687	"Enma Gets Lured"	October 18, 2005
688	"Usui Black Tea Mask"	October 19, 2005
689	"Mobile Phone Denbo"	October 20, 2005
690	"N/A"	October 21, 2005
691	"The Three Piece Set, Increases"	October 24, 2005
692	"N/A"	October 25, 2005
693	"Hoshino, Gets Stuck Again"	October 26, 2005
694	"The Waiting Way"	October 27, 2005
695	"The Scepter, Becomes Delicious"	October 28, 2005
696	"Volley, Ballet"	October 31, 2005
697	"Paradise"	November 1, 2005
698	"N/A"	November 2, 2005
699	"Kazuma's Birthday"	November 3, 2005
700	"Tomayo"	November 4, 2005
701	"Penguin, Penguin, Penguin"	November 7, 2005
702	"Mr. Ken Finds His New Self"	November 8, 2005
703	"The Forest and Ojarumaru"	November 9, 2005
704	"N/A"	November 10, 2005
705	"N/A"	November 11, 2005
706	"Deliver Pudding"	November 14, 2005
707	"My Pork"	November 15, 2005
708	"Yesterday's Ojarumaru"	November 16, 2005
709	"N/A"	November 17, 2005
710	"Mr. Director's Secret Flower Garden"	November 18, 2005
711	"Returning Home"	November 21, 2005
712	"Otome, Doing an Arranged Marriage"	November 22, 2005
713	"There's No Lid"	November 23, 2005
714	"Chikuwa 3"	November 24, 2005
715	"N/A"	November 25, 2005
716	"The Tiny Things Club Presentation"	November 28, 2005
717	"Otome Twirling"	November 29, 2005
718	"The Stairway"	November 30, 2005
719	"Usui's World"	December 1, 2005
720	"Oja-Dance"	December 2, 2005

=== Series 9 (2006) ===
No.	Title	Original release date

=== Series 10 (2007) ===
No.	Title	Original release date

=== Series 11 (2008) ===
No.	Title	Original release date

=== Series 12 (2009–2010) ===
No.	Title	Original release date

=== Series 13 (2010) ===
No.	Title	Original release date

=== Series 14 (2011) ===
No.	Title	Original release date

=== Series 15 (2012) ===
No.	Title	Original release date

=== Series 16 (2013) ===
No.	Title	Original release date
1349	Transliteration: "Ī Kao Shitai Ojarumaru" (Japanese: いい顔したいおじゃる丸)	April 1, 2013
1350	"Similar People Companion"; Transliteration: "Nitamono Dōshi" (Japanese: にたものどうし)	April 2, 2013
1351	Transliteration: "Shitte Shimatta Aobee" (Japanese: 知ってしまったアオベエ)	April 3, 2013
1352	Transliteration: "Denbo Kogi Makuru" (Japanese: 電ボ こぎまくる)	April 4, 2013
1353	"Okame the Lovable Shichihenge"; Transliteration: "Okame Nadeshiko Shichihenge" (Japanese: オカメなでしこ七変化)	April 5, 2013
1354	"My Wise Saying"; Transliteration: "Maro no Meigen" (Japanese: マロの名言)	April 8, 2013
1355	Transliteration: "Shaku Potto Naru" (Japanese: シャク ポッとなる)	April 9, 2013
1356	"The Various Photographs"; Transliteration: "Shashin Iroiro" (Japanese: 写真いろいろ)	April 10, 2013
1357	"Poverty-chan Quits the Tiny Club"; Transliteration: "Bin-chan Chicchai Mono Kurabu Yamerutteyo" (Japanese: 貧ちゃん ちっちゃいものクラブやめるってよ)	April 11, 2013
1358	"The Oni Child and the Schedule"; Transliteration: "Kooni to Yotei-hyō" (Japanese: 子鬼と予定表)	April 12, 2013
1359	"Cold Tessai's Chair"; Transliteration: "Rei Tessai no Isu" (Japanese: 冷徹斎のイス)	April 15, 2013
1360	"Akane Jūmonji"; Transliteration: "Jūmonji Akane" (Japanese: 十文字アカネ)	April 16, 2013
1361	Transliteration: "Na· a· ni?" (Japanese: な・あ・に？)	April 17, 2013
1362	Transliteration: "Kasakasa Butabuta" (Japanese: かさかさぶたぶた)	April 18, 2013
1363	"Who's... This Old Man?"; Transliteration: "Sono Ojisan··· Dare de Ojaru?" (Japanese: そのおじさん・・・だれでおじゃる？)	April 19, 2013
1364	"Okame and the Strength Inspiration of Love"; Transliteration: "Okame Ai no Chikara Kobu" (Japanese: オカメ 愛の力こぶ)	April 22, 2013
1365	"Father Comes"; Transliteration: "Chichiue Kuru" (Japanese: 父上 来る)	April 23, 2013
1366	"Usui Becomes a Flash Girl"; Transliteration: "Usui Furaggāru ni Naru" (Japanese: うすい フラッガールになる)	April 24, 2013
1367	Transliteration: "Kūru jano Okobou" (Japanese: クールじゃの オコ坊)	April 25, 2013
1368	Transliteration: "Tsuki Tsukimatō" (Japanese: 月つきまとう)	April 26, 2013
1369	"Aobee Becomes Ojaru's Fellow"; Transliteration: "Aobee Ojaru no Nakama ni Naru" (Japanese: アオベエ おじゃるの仲間になる)	April 29, 2013
1370	"Usui Designing"; Transliteration: "Usui Dezain Suru" (Japanese: うすい デザインする)	April 30, 2013
1371	"The Scepter's Dream"; Transliteration: "Shaku no Yume" (Japanese: シャクの夢)	May 1, 2013
1372	"Ojaru Draws a Rock"; Transliteration: "Ojaru Ishi o Egaku" (Japanese: おじゃる 石をえがく)	May 2, 2013
1373	Transliteration: "Ojaru Hayaku Oki Sugiru" (Japanese: おじゃる 早く起きすぎる)	May 3, 2013
1374	"Kin-chan's Blue Bird"; Transliteration: "Kin-chan no Aoi Tori" (Japanese: 金ちゃんの青い鳥)	May 6, 2013
1375	Transliteration: "Sono Kamen Dare jano?" (Japanese: その仮面 だれじゃの?)	May 7, 2013
1376	"Ojarumaru Plays the Cello"; Transliteration: "Sero o Hajiku Ojarumaru" (Japanese: セロを弾く おじゃる丸)	May 8, 2013
1377	Transliteration: "Modorenai Maiku" (Japanese: もどれないマイク)	May 9, 2013
1378	"Oja Merman"; Transliteration: "Oja Ningyo" (Japanese: おじゃ人魚)	May 10, 2013
1379	Transliteration: "Hanko Atsume wa Tsurai de Ojaru" (Japanese: ハンコあつめは辛いでおじゃる)	May 13, 2013
1380	"The Mangan Shrine Becomes Busy"; Transliteration: "Mangan Jinja Nigiyaka ni Naru" (Japanese: 満願神社 にぎやかになる)	May 14, 2013
1381	"Kin-chan No. 28 in the Cap"; Transliteration: "Eboshi no Naka no Kin-chan 28-Gō" (Japanese: エボシの中の金ちゃん28号)	May 15, 2013
1382	"Cold Tessai Becomes a Part-Timer"; Transliteration: "Rei Tessai Furītā ni Naru" (Japanese: 冷徹斎 フリーターになる)	May 16, 2013
1383	"Kazuma Pudding"; Transliteration: "Kazuma Purin" (Japanese: カズマプリン)	May 17, 2013
1384	Transliteration: "Usui Yome nai Hatsu" (Japanese: うすい よめないハッ)	May 20, 2013
1385	Transliteration: "Mayoi Neko Oja Ran" (Japanese: まよいねこ おじゃらん)	May 21, 2013
1386	"Tamae Strategy"; Transliteration: "Tamae Sakusen" (Japanese: たまえ作戦)	May 22, 2013
1387	"Either Sweet or Salty Watermelons"; Transliteration: "Suika Amai ka Shoppai ka" (Japanese: すいか あまいか しょっぱいか)	May 23, 2013
1388	"Continuing"; Transliteration: "Tsudzuku de Ojaru" (Japanese: つづくでおじゃる)	May 24, 2013
1389	"The Pudding is in There Now"; Transliteration: "Ima Soko ni aru Purin" (Japanese: 今そこにあるプリン)	October 7, 2013
1390	"Poverty-chan's Birthday"; Transliteration: "Bin-chan no Tanjōbi" (Japanese: 貧ちゃんの誕生日)	October 8, 2013
1391	Transliteration: "Kin Shidai" (Japanese: 金しだい)	October 9, 2013
1392	"The Shadow"; Transliteration: "Kage yo" (Japanese: かげよ)	October 10, 2013
1393	"Scoop vs Hoshino vs Moroboshi"; Transliteration: "Sukūpu tai Hoshino tai Moroboshi" (Japanese: スクープ対星野対諸星)	October 11, 2013
1394	Transliteration: "Denai de Ojaru" (Japanese: 出ないでおじゃる)	October 14, 2013
1395	Transliteration: "Ame Ame Fure Fure" (Japanese: あめあめふれふれ)	October 15, 2013
1396	"Enma is Well Liked"; Transliteration: "Enma Moteru" (Japanese: エンマ モテる)	October 16, 2013
1397	Transliteration: "Sono Saki ga Shiritai Ojarumaru" (Japanese: その先が知りたいおじゃる丸)	October 17, 2013
1398	"Ojaru Becomes a Cow"; Transliteration: "Ojaru Ushi ni Naru" (Japanese: おじゃる 牛になる)	October 18, 2013
1399	Transliteration: "Kicchiri Kacchiri Ī Tamae" (Japanese: キッチリカッチリ言いたまえ)	October 21, 2013
1400	"Mr. Kawakami Opens a Curry Shop"; Transliteration: "Kawakami-san Karē-ya Hajimeru" (Japanese: 川上さん カレー屋はじめる)	October 22, 2013
1401	"Nana"; Transliteration: "Nana" (Japanese: ナナ)	October 23, 2013
1402	"Warashi and the Hoshino Family"; Transliteration: "Warashi to Hoshino Ikka" (Japanese: ワラシと星野一家)	October 24, 2013
1403	"The Hard Pudding"; Transliteration: "Kachinkochin Purin" (Japanese: かちんこちんぷりん)	October 25, 2013
1404	Transliteration: "Furomae Romae" (Japanese: フロマエロマエ)	October 28, 2013
1405	"Attending the Enma Classroom"; Transliteration: "Enma Okyōshitsu ni Kayou" (Japanese: エンマ お教室に通う)	October 29, 2013
1406	"Father's Cap"; Transliteration: "Chichiue no Eboshi" (Japanese: 父上のエボシ)	October 30, 2013
1407	Transliteration: "Koibumi no Kimi" (Japanese: 恋文の君)	October 31, 2013
1408	"Aka Murasaki Shikibu Diary"; Transliteration: "Aka Murasaki Shikibu Nikki" (Japanese: 赤紫式部日記)	November 1, 2013
1409	Transliteration: "Bimyo" (Japanese: びみょー)	November 4, 2013
1410	"Usui's Fan"; Transliteration: "Usui no Fan" (Japanese: うすいのファン)	November 5, 2013
1411	"The Garbage and the Insect"; Transliteration: "Gomi to Mushikera" (Japanese: ゴミと虫けら)	November 6, 2013
1412	"The Naked Ojaru-sama"; Transliteration: "Hadaka no Ojaru-sama" (Japanese: 裸のおじゃる様)	November 7, 2013
1413	"Kisuke's Tusk"; Transliteration: "Kisuke no Kiba" (Japanese: キスケのきば)	November 8, 2013
1414	"Yoshiko Tanaka's Kamishibai"; Transliteration: "Tanaka Yoshiko no Kamishibai" (Japanese: タナカヨシコの紙芝居)	November 11, 2013
1415	"Getting Stuck Flying in the Sky"; Transliteration: "Soratobu Hamaru" (Japanese: 空飛ぶハマる)	November 12, 2013
1416	"Cocoa of the Night"; Transliteration: "Yoru no Kokoa" (Japanese: 夜のココア)	November 13, 2013
1417	"The Tiny Onsen Club"; Transliteration: "Chicchai Onsen Kurabu" (Japanese: ちっちゃい温泉クラブ)	November 14, 2013
1418	"The Moonlight Town Session"; Transliteration: "Gekkō Machi Sesshon" (Japanese: 月光町セッション)	November 15, 2013

=== Series 17 (2014) ===
No.	Title	Original release date
1419	"Kazuma Laid-back"	April 1, 2014
1420	"Under One Roof"	April 2, 2014
1421	"N/A"	April 3, 2014
1422	"Ojarumaru Wants a Return Gift"	April 4, 2014
1423	"N/A"	May 19, 2014
1424	"N/A"	April 7, 2014
1425	"Aobee Can't Think of a Strategy"	April 8, 2014
1426	"Puddings, Puddings, Puddings,"	April 9, 2014
1427	"Ojarumaru Became an Oni Child"	April 10, 2014
1428	"Makoto's Miso Soup"	April 11, 2014
1429	"The Oni Child Grasps"	April 14, 2014
1430	"Oko-Niko Makes a Club"	April 15, 2014
1431	"Dance, Old Men"	April 16, 2014
1432	"Dating"	April 17, 2014
1433	"N/A"	April 18, 2014
1434	"Turtle and Crane"	April 21, 2014
1435	"Black and White Cold Tessai"	April 22, 2014
1436	"The Oni Child Recruiting a Maid"	April 23, 2014
1437	"Tanaka Sells a Handle"	April 24, 2014
1438	"The Flea Market"	April 25, 2014
1439	"Ojaru Builds a Strategy"	April 28, 2014
1440	"Viva, Bite"	April 29, 2014
1441	"Denbo Can't Fly"	April 30, 2014
1442	"N/A"	May 1, 2014
1443	"Bath Mask Appears"	May 2, 2014
1444	"N/A"	May 5, 2014
1445	"Kame-Tome Fly in the Sky"	May 6, 2014
1446	"Kobayashi Tea's Love Poem"	May 7, 2014
1447	"Hifumi Marriage?"	May 8, 2014
1448	"Poverty Poverty-chan"	May 9, 2014
1449	"N/A"	May 12, 2014
1450	"Viva, Brilliant-Slowly"	May 13, 2014
1451	"N/A"	May 14, 2014
1452	"The Oni Child Album"	May 15, 2014
1453	"N/A"	May 16, 2014
1454	"The Great Adventure in the Laid-back Midsummer: Ojarumaru Disappeared Part 1"	July 21, 2014
1455	"The Great Adventure in the Laid-back Midsummer: Ojarumaru Disappeared Part 2"	July 22, 2014
1456	"The Great Adventure in the Laid-back Midsummer: Ojarumaru Disappeared Part 3"	July 23, 2014
1457	"The Great Adventure in the Laid-back Midsummer: Ojarumaru Disappeared Part 4"	July 24, 2014
1458	"The Great Adventure in the Laid-back Midsummer: Ojarumaru Disappeared Part 5"	July 25, 2014
1459	"Cow and the Melons"	September 29, 2014
1460	"N/A"	September 30, 2014
1461	"Rhythm Gradually"	October 1, 2014
1462	"Ojack and the Pudding Stalk"	October 2, 2014
1463	"Romantic Sachiyo"	October 3, 2014
1464	"N/A"	October 6, 2014
1465	"N/A"	October 7, 2014
1466	"Tsukkii Dreams"	October 8, 2014
1467	"Akane Becomes a House"	October 9, 2014
1468	"Hoshino Goes to the Sentō"	October 10, 2014
1469	"Kazuma Likes Dogs?"	October 13, 2014
1470	"New"	October 14, 2014
1471	"N/A"	October 15, 2014
1472	"Tazan Makes a Masterpiece"	October 16, 2014
1473	"N/A"	October 17, 2014
1474	"Hoshino VS Tsukkii"	October 20, 2014
1475	"The Pebble Color Pencil"	October 21, 2014
1476	"Japanese Tea VS Coffee"	October 22, 2014
1477	"The Cap Sparkles Moonlight Town"	October 23, 2014
1478	"Onigiri Dance"	October 24, 2014
1479	"Chihayaburu"	October 27, 2014
1480	"The Tiny Hyakunin Isshu"	October 28, 2014
1481	"The Night of the Summer is..."	October 29, 2014
1482	"N/A"	October 30, 2014
1483	"Semimaron"	October 31, 2014
1484	"N/A"	November 3, 2014
1485	"Kazuma Can't Distinguish"	November 4, 2014
1486	"Mr. Ken Guides Maeda"	November 5, 2014
1487	"The Talkative Tools"	November 6, 2014
1488	"Tea's Classroom"	November 7, 2014

=== Series 18 (2015) ===
No.	Title	Original release date
1489	"My Pebble"	April 1, 2015
1490	"The Lost Properties"	April 2, 2015
1491	"Ojaru Watch"	April 3, 2015
1492	"There's Not Enough Peaches"	April 8, 2015
1493	"Oja Retsu"	April 9, 2015
1494	"Pudding Seed"	April 10, 2015
1495	"One Thousand Years of Love"	April 15, 2015
1496	"Kazuma Looks After the Scepter"	April 16, 2015
1497	"The Tiresome Duckling"	April 17, 2015
1498	"Pe"	April 22, 2015
1499	"The Old Men's Secret"	April 23, 2015
1500	"Where's the Scepter?"	April 24, 2015
1501	"Gagaga"	April 29, 2015
1502	"Marie's Party"	April 30, 2015
1503	"Kisuke Becomes an Adult"	May 1, 2015
1504	"Flightless Denbo"	May 6, 2015
1505	"N/A"	May 7, 2015
1506	"N/A"	May 8, 2015
1507	"N/A"	May 13, 2015
1508	"Puun"	May 14, 2015
1509	"Cold Tessai is Always Being Different"	May 15, 2015
1510	"The Lovely Obake-sama"	May 20, 2015
1511	"Kame Makes Cranes"	May 21, 2015
1512	"Reward Pudding"	May 22, 2015
1513	"Love and the Pebble"	May 27, 2015
1514	"Perfect Denbo"	May 28, 2015
1515	"Moroboshi Appears Once Again"	May 29, 2015
1516	"Pudding VS Ojaru"	June 3, 2015
1517	"Turtle's Yarn"	June 4, 2015
1518	"The Tamae Fortune-telling"	June 5, 2015
1519	"N/A"	June 10, 2015
1520	"Which Ball?"	June 11, 2015
1521	"N/A"	June 12, 2015
1522	"N/A"	October 7, 2015
1523	"N/A"	October 8, 2015
1524	"Dark Oni and the 13 Scary Circle of Friends"	October 9, 2015
1525	"The Tiny Flea Market"	October 14, 2015
1526	"Ojaru the Wolf Boy"	October 15, 2015
1527	"N/A"	October 16, 2015
1528	"Rainy Day Shiritori"	October 21, 2015
1529	"Enma: The Livelihood of Ai"	October 22, 2015
1530	"Ojarumaru's Secret"	October 23, 2015
1531	"N/A"	October 28, 2015
1532	"N/A"	October 29, 2015
1533	"Please Forgive Me"	October 30, 2015
1534	"N/A"	November 4, 2015
1535	"Okame to the Arranged Marriage"	November 5, 2015
1536	"Relaxing Early"	November 6, 2015
1537	"I'm Waiting for Your Yellow Handkerchief"	November 11, 2015
1538	"The Broken Byōbu"	November 12, 2015
1539	"The Tiny Sumo"	November 13, 2015
1540	"Stuck in the Moonlight Town Police Box"	November 18, 2015
1541	"Ojarumaru Doesn't Want to Be Sucked"	November 19, 2015
1542	"Cold Tessai Doesn't Understand"	November 20, 2015
1543	"Moonlight Town News"	November 25, 2015
1544	"I'm Everywhere"	November 26, 2015
1545	"Denbo Receives a Test"	November 27, 2015
1546	"N/A"	December 2, 2015
1547	"The Moonlight Flower"	December 3, 2015
1548	"I'm Weary"	December 4, 2015
1549	"Scepteer～"	December 9, 2015
1550	"Frozen Moonlight Pond"	December 10, 2015
1551	"N/A"	December 11, 2015

== Specials ==
No.	Title	Original release date
1	"Ojarumaru: A Happy Blue Back"; Transliteration: "Ojarumaru Shiawase no Aoi Senaka" (Japanese: おじゃる丸 しあわせの青いせなか)	January 1, 2000
Ojarumaru loves the comfy touch of Kazuma's back. He wants to have carefree chats with Kazuma, but is flatly ignored by his sleepy friend. Getting sulky, Ojarumaru goes out for a trip to search for someone who might have a comfortable back to lean on. Later on, Kazuma and Denbo find out Ojarumaru has left the house and search all over Moonlight Town for him.
2	"Ojarumaru: Peril at the Full Moon Road ~A Rare Adventure of Our Prince~"; Transliteration: "Ojarumaru Mangetsu Rōdo Kikiippatsu 〜 Tama ni wa Maro mo Daibōken 〜" (Japanese: おじゃる丸 満月ロード危機一髪～タマにはマロも大冒険～)	May 3, 2007
Ojarumaru on Kazuma's back as usual is busy with run-and-chase with the Oni Child Trio all over Moonlight Town to the Heian era. Then, they are surprised that the Full Moon Road connecting Moonlight Town and the Heian era is shrinking. The water level of the Moonlight Pond is getting down. Suddenly a girl with big smile appears. The girl, Tsukimi, tells them that the Moonlight Hole at the entrance of Enma World and the Moonlight Pond are drying up and the Full Moon Road will disappear soon. The only way to prevent this disaster is to find and collect divine 10 spheres coming down from the Heian era before the nest full moon comes. The full moon is tomorrow! They have only 2 days to save the Full Moon Road. There's no time for run-and-chase. Ojarumaru, Kazuma, Denbo, Akane, Kisuke and Aobee start looking for the spheres together. Will they find 10 spheres in time? Can they restore the Full Moon Road? Thus a hilarious adventure with full of mishaps and touching friendship begins!
3	"Ojarumaru Special: My Galaxy is Calling ~The 2 Wishing Stars~"; Transliteration: "Ojarumaru Supesharu Ginga ga Maro o Yonde Iru 〜 Futari no Negai Hoshi 〜" (Japanese: おじゃる丸スペシャル 銀河がマロを呼んでいる～ふたりのねがい星～)	March 20, 2012
Ojarumaru and Kazuma receive a gift from Kanae, the falling star from outer space. It is the ticket of the Galaxy Express. They are told that they will arrive at the Wish Star at the end of the galaxy railroad. Ojarumaru is excited that his longtime wish to have 10 sweet puddings every day might come true! On a clear night with full of twinkling thousands stars, Ojarumaru and Kazuma hop in the Galaxy Express. What is waiting for them on the way? What is the Wish Star at the terminal? This is the fantastic adventures travelling through the stars in Milky Way!
4	"Ojarumaru Special: Hinata in the Forgotten Forest"; Transliteration: "Ojarumaru Wasureta Mori no Hinata" (Japanese: おじゃる丸スペシャル わすれた森のヒナタ)	August 14, 2015

== Home media ==
=== VHS ===
Nippon Crown (Japan, Region 2 VHS)
Volume		Episodes	Release date	Ref.
第1シリーズ	Volume 1	1–6	December 16, 1998	
第1シリーズ	Volume 2	7–12	December 16, 1998	
第1シリーズ	Volume 3	13–18	December 16, 1998	
第1シリーズ	Volume 4	19–24	December 16, 1998	
第1シリーズ	Volume 5	25–30	December 16, 1998	
第1シリーズ	Volume 6	31–36	February 24, 1999	
第1シリーズ	Volume 7	37–42	February 24, 1999	
第1シリーズ	Volume 8	43–48	February 24, 1999	
第1シリーズ	Volume 9	49–54	February 24, 1999	
第1シリーズ	Volume 10	55–60	February 24, 1999	
第1シリーズ	Volume 11	61–66	April 21, 1999	
第1シリーズ	Volume 12	67–72	April 21, 1999	
第1シリーズ	Volume 13	73–78	April 21, 1999	
第1シリーズ	Volume 14	79–84	April 21, 1999	
第1シリーズ	Volume 15	85–90	April 21, 1999	
第2シリーズ	Volume 1	91–96	July 23, 1999	
第2シリーズ	Volume 2	97–102	July 23, 1999	
第2シリーズ	Volume 3	103–108	July 23, 1999	
第2シリーズ	Volume 4	109–114	July 23, 1999	
第2シリーズ	Volume 5	115–120	July 23, 1999	
第2シリーズ	Volume 6	121–126	October 21, 1999	
第2シリーズ	Volume 7	127–132	October 21, 1999	
第2シリーズ	Volume 8	133–138	October 21, 1999	
第2シリーズ	Volume 9	139–144	October 21, 1999	
第2シリーズ	Volume 10	145–150	October 21, 1999	
第2シリーズ	Volume 11	151–156	December 1, 1999	
第2シリーズ	Volume 12	157–162	December 1, 1999	
第2シリーズ	Volume 13	163–168	December 1, 1999	
第2シリーズ	Volume 14	169–174	December 1, 1999	
第2シリーズ	Volume 15	175–180	December 1, 1999	
第3シリーズ	Volume 1	181–186	June 21, 2000	
第3シリーズ	Volume 2	187–192	June 21, 2000	
第3シリーズ	Volume 3	193–198	June 21, 2000	
第3シリーズ	Volume 4	199–204	August 23, 2000	
第3シリーズ	Volume 5	205–210	August 23, 2000	
第3シリーズ	Volume 6	211–216	August 23, 2000	
第3シリーズ	Volume 7	217–222	October 25, 2000	
第3シリーズ	Volume 8	223–228	October 25, 2000	
第3シリーズ	Volume 9	229–234	October 25, 2000	
第3シリーズ	Volume 10	235–240	December 16, 2000	
第3シリーズ	Volume 11	241–246	December 16, 2000	
第3シリーズ	Volume 12	247–252	December 16, 2000	
第3シリーズ	Volume 13	253–258	February 21, 2001	
第3シリーズ	Volume 14	259–264	February 21, 2001	
第3シリーズ	Volume 15	265–270	February 21, 2001	
第4シリーズ	Volume 1	271–276	August 3, 2001	
第4シリーズ	Volume 2	277–282	August 3, 2001	
第4シリーズ	Volume 3	283–288	August 3, 2001	
第4シリーズ	Volume 4	289–294	October 5, 2001	
第4シリーズ	Volume 5	295–300	October 5, 2001	
第4シリーズ	Volume 6	301–306	October 5, 2001	
第4シリーズ	Volume 7	307–312	December 7, 2001	
第4シリーズ	Volume 8	313–318	December 7, 2001	
第4シリーズ	Volume 9	319–324	December 7, 2001	
第4シリーズ	Volume 10	325–330	February 8, 2002	
第4シリーズ	Volume 11	331–336	February 8, 2002	
第4シリーズ	Volume 12	337–342	February 8, 2002	
第4シリーズ	Volume 13	343–348	April 5, 2002	
第4シリーズ	Volume 14	349–354	April 5, 2002	
第4シリーズ	Volume 15	355–360	April 5, 2002	
第5シリーズ	Volume 1	361–366	October 25, 2002	
第5シリーズ	Volume 2	367–372	October 25, 2002	
第5シリーズ	Volume 3	373–378	October 25, 2002	
第5シリーズ	Volume 4	379–384	December 27, 2002	
第5シリーズ	Volume 5	385–390	December 27, 2002	
第5シリーズ	Volume 6	391–396	December 27, 2002	
第5シリーズ	Volume 7	397–402	February 21, 2003	
第5シリーズ	Volume 8	403–408	February 21, 2003	
第5シリーズ	Volume 9	409–414	February 21, 2003	
第5シリーズ	Volume 10	415–420	July 25, 2003	
第5シリーズ	Volume 11	421–426	July 25, 2003	
第5シリーズ	Volume 12	427–432	July 25, 2003	
第5シリーズ	Volume 13	433–438	August 22, 2003	
第5シリーズ	Volume 14	439–444	August 22, 2003	
第5シリーズ	Volume 15	445–450	August 22, 2003	
しあわせの青いせなか		SP1	July 26, 2000	

NHK Software (Japan, Region 2 VHS)
Volume		Episodes	Release date	Ref.
第6シリーズ	おじゃるとゆかいななかまたち	465, 478, 481, 504, 507, 508, 527, 533	August 27, 2004	
第6シリーズ	おじゃる丸の毎日	467, 473, 486, 495, 514, 522, 529, 537	August 27, 2004	

=== DVD ===
Nippon Crown (Japan, Region 2 DVD)
Volume		Episodes	Release date	Ref.
第1シリーズ	Volume 1	1–5, 8, 9, 14, 18, 24	September 21, 2002	
第1シリーズ	Volume 2	32, 38, 39, 43, 68, 71, 77, 79, 80, 90	September 21, 2002	
第2シリーズ	Volume 1	92, 99, 104, 106–109, 116, 120, 121	November 21, 2002	
第2シリーズ	Volume 2	123, 128, 146, 149, 151, 156, 161, 162, 168, 169	November 21, 2002	
第3シリーズ	Volume 1	181, 185, 186, 201, 214, 215, 217, 221, 224	January 22, 2003	
第3シリーズ	Volume 2	225, 230, 238, 240, 242, 246, 251, 253, 264, 270	January 22, 2003	
第4シリーズ	Volume 1	273–276, 290, 296, 303, 305, 319	April 2, 2003	
第4シリーズ	Volume 2	322, 326, 328, 329, 337, 339, 347, 351, 354, 357	April 2, 2003	
第5シリーズ	Volume 1	363, 365, 372, 375, 379, 382, 390, 399, 400, 402	August 21, 2003	
第5シリーズ	Volume 2	406, 409, 413, 422, 423, 435, 446, 447, 449, 450	August 21, 2003	

NHK Enterprises (Japan, Region 2 DVD)
Volume		Episodes	Release date	Ref.
第6シリーズ	おじゃるとゆかいななかまたち	465, 478, 481, 504, 507, 508, 527, 533	July 23, 2004	
第6シリーズ	おじゃる丸の毎日	467, 473, 486, 495, 514, 522, 529, 537	July 23, 2004	
マロも大すき月光町		546, 565, 571, 613, 614, 617, 630, 654, 670, 693, 698, 720	January 25, 2008	
マロのゆかいな世界		721, 738, 743, 748, 812, 818, 823, 836, 873, 896, 899, 900	January 25, 2008	
満月ロード危機一髪~タマにはマロも大冒険		SP2	January 25, 2008	
スペシャル 銀河がマロを呼んでいる ～ふたりのねがい星～		SP3	June 22, 2012	
スペシャル わすれた森のヒナタ		SP4, 1, 2, 90	November 27, 2015	

Nippon Columbia (Japan, Region 2 DVD)
Volume	Episodes	Release date	Ref.
まったり真夏の大ぼうけん 消えたおじゃる丸&ベストセレクション	1081, 1171, 1283, 1353, 1369, 1454–1458	November 19, 2014	
百人一首でおじゃる丸&ベストセレクション	1176, 1186, 1348, 1394, 1418, 1479–1483	November 19, 2014	
