= Survival (manhwa) =

South Korean manhwa series

살아남기 RR: Saranamgi MR: Saranamgi
- Genre: Survival
- Author: Hyun Dong Han; Jung Wook Kim
- Webtoon service: MiraeN (Korean); Asahi Shimbun (Japanese); No Starch Press (English)
- Original run: 2008 – present
- Volumes: 85
- Original net animation
- Directed by: Yoko Furuya
- Music by: Tasuku Odaka
- Studio: Toei Animation
- Released: March 28, 2019
- Runtime: 1 minute
- Anime film

Surviving Science! Survival in Body
- Directed by: Mitsuru Nasukawa
- Written by: Isao Murayama
- Music by: Kei Yoshikawa
- Studio: Toei Animation; Gallop
- Released: July 31, 2020
- Anime film

Shinkai no Survival!
- Directed by: Satoru Iriyoshi
- Written by: Isao Murayama
- Studio: Toei Animation; Gallop
- Released: August 13, 2021
- Anime television series

Surviving Science!
- Directed by: Masahiro Hosoda
- Written by: Isao Murayama
- Music by: Kei Yoshikawa
- Studio: Gallop
- Original network: NHK Educational TV
- Original run: October 6, 2024 – March 14, 2026
- Episodes: 19

Survival (Korean: 살아남기; RR: Saranamgi, Japanese: 科学漫画サバイバル, romanized: Kagaku Manga Survival) is a South Korean manhwa series by Hyun Dong Han and Jung Wook Kim. The Korean comic book series has been translated and have sold more than 28 million copies worldwide. The series also received several anime adaptations.

== Characters ==
Geo (ジオ)
Voiced by: Satsumi Matsuda
Pipi (ピピ)
Voiced by: Megumi Han
Kei (ケイ)
Voiced by: Akira Ishida

== Media ==
=== Anime ===
An original net animation produced by Toei Animation was released online on March 28, 2019. Two anime films by Toei Animation and Gallop titled respectively Jintai no Survival! and Shinkai no Survival! were released between July 31, 2020, and August 13, 2021.

An anime television series adaptation was announced on February 16, 2024. The series is produced by NHK, NHK Enterprises and Toei Animation, animated by Gallop, and directed by Masahiro Hosoda, with Isao Murayama writing scripts, Gil Bo Noh designing the characters, and Kei Yoshikawa composing the music. It aired from October 6, 2024 to March 16, 2025 on NHK Educational TV. A second season aired from October 4, 2025 to March 14, 2026 on the same television network.

Jme TV is currently streaming the anime series alongside the first film in North America.
