= Gallop (studio) =

Japanese animation studio

Gallop Co., Ltd.

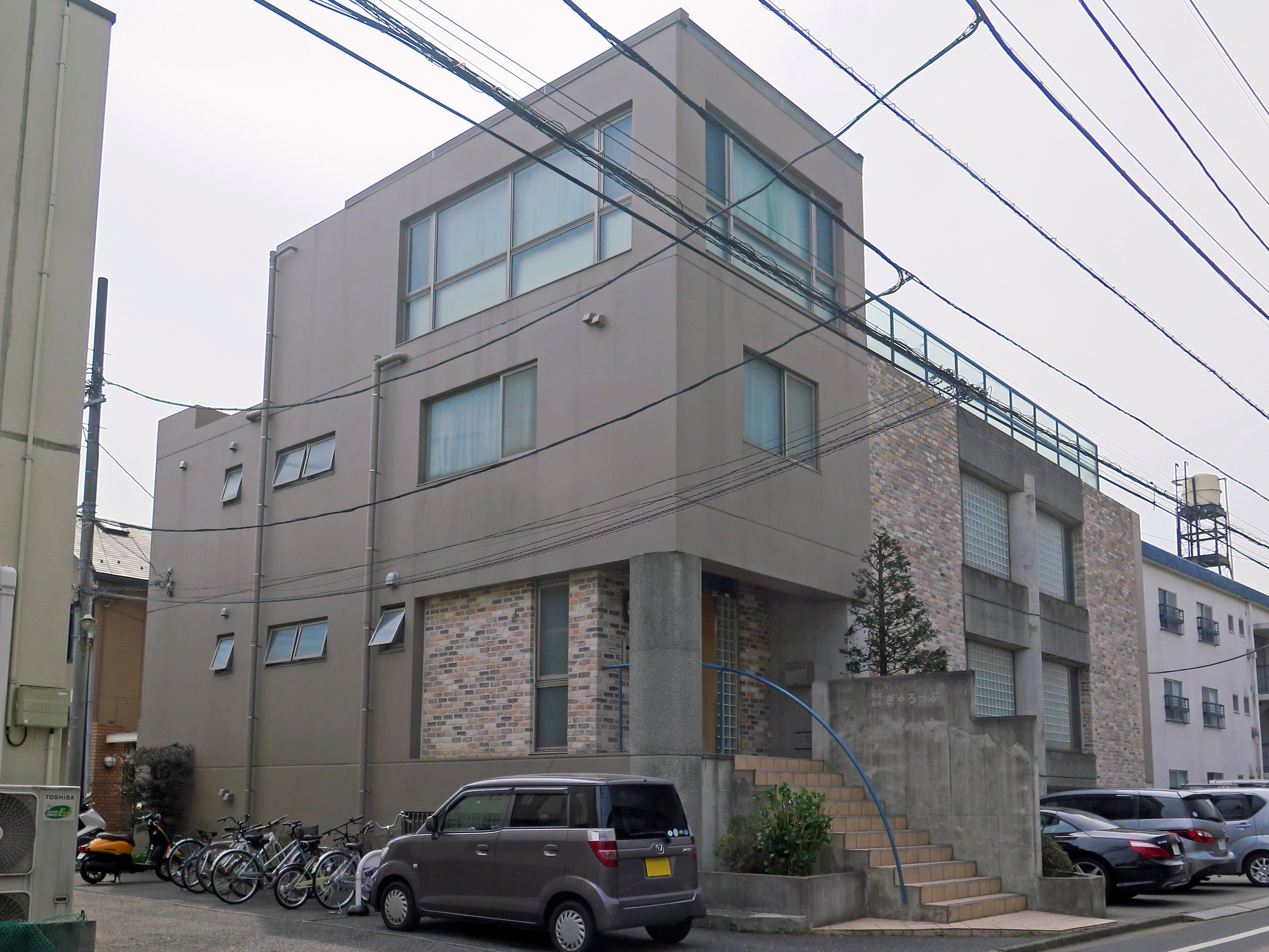
- Gallop Co., Ltd. headquarters in Nerima, Tokyo, Japan
- Native name: 株式会社ぎゃろっぷ
- Romanized name: Kabushiki Kaisha Gyaroppu
- Type: Kabushiki gaisha
- Industry: Anime production and planning
- Predecessor: Studio Gallop Y.K. (1978–2001)
- Founded: December 13, 1978; 47 years ago
- Headquarters: 3-20-36 Sekimachikita; Nerima, Tokyo, Japan 177-0051
- Area served: Japan
- Key people: Akio Wakana (representative director)
- Subsidiaries: Dong Woo Animation
- Website: www.anime-gallop.co.jp

Gallop Co., Ltd. (株式会社ぎゃろっぷ, Kabushiki Kaisha Gyaroppu), sometimes credited as Studio Gallop (スタジオぎゃろっぷ, Sutajio Gyaroppu), is a Japanese animation studio founded on December 13, 1978, by former Mushi Pro members.

== Works ==
=== TV series ===
==== 1980s ====
- Touch (1985–1987) (production assistance; animated by Group TAC)
- High School! Kimengumi (1985–1987) (production assistance; animated by Studio Comet)
- The Three Musketeers Anime (1987–1989) (animation cooperation with Sei Young Animation)
- Kiteretsu Daihyakka (1988–1996)
- Gaki Deka (1989–1990)
- Miracle Giants Dome-kun (1989–1990)

==== 1990s ====
- Tanken Goblin Tou (1990–1991)
- RPG Densetsu Hepoi (1990–1991)
- Genji Tsūshin Agedama (1991–1992)
- Chikyū SOS Soreike Kororin (1992–1993)
- Hime-chan's Ribbon (1992–1993)
- Akazukin Chacha (1994–1995)
- Nurse Angel Ririka SOS (1995–1996)
- Rurouni Kenshin (1996–1997) (first 66 episodes; later animated by Studio Deen)
- Kodocha (1996–1998)
- Kochira Katsushika-ku Kameari Kōen-mae Hashutsujo (regular broadcast: 1996–2004; special broadcast: 2005–2008; last special episode: 2016)
- Anime television de Hakken! Tamagotchi (1997–1998)
- Initial D: First Stage (1998) (animation cooperation with Studio Comet)
- Ojarumaru (1998–present)

==== 2000s ====
- Transformers: Car Robots (2000)
- Yu-Gi-Oh! Duel Monsters (2000–2004)
- Forza Hidemaru (2002)
- Legendz Yomigaeru Ryūō Densetsu (2004–2005)
- Morizo to Kikkoro (2004–2005)
- Yu-Gi-Oh! GX (2004–2008)
- Animal Yokocho (2005–2006)
- Eyeshield 21 (2005–2008)
- Hataraki Man (2006)
- Yu-Gi-Oh! 5D's (2008–2011)
- Mainichi Kaasan (2009–2011, first 96 episodes; later animated by TYO Animations)

==== 2010s ====
- Yu-Gi-Oh! Zexal (2011–2014)
- Yu-Gi-Oh! Arc-V (2014–2017)
- Yu-Gi-Oh! VRAINS (2017–2019)
- Bakutsuri Bar Hunter (2018–2019) (animation cooperation with Toei Animation)

==== 2020s ====
- Fushigi Dagashiya Zenitendō (2022–2025) (animation cooperation with Toei Animation; episode 53 onwards)
- Me & Roboco (2022–2023)
- Kagaku Manga Survival (2024)
- Shin Kochira Katsushika-ku Kameari Kōen Mae Hashutsujo (2027)

=== Original video animations ===
- Prefectural Earth Defense Force (1986)
- Mugen Shinshi Bōken Katsugeki-hen (1987)
- Maps: Densetsu no Samayoeru Seijintachi (1987)
- TWD Express: Rolling Takeoff (1987)
- To-y (1987)
- One Pound Gospel (1988)
- Fujiko F. Fujio no SF Tanpen Theater (1990–1991) (episodes 1–2, 5–6, 9–10)

=== Films ===
- The Three Musketeers Anime: Aramis' Adventure (1989)
- Rurouni Kenshin: The Motion Picture (1997)
- Kochira Katsushika-ku Kameari Kōen-mae Hashutsujo the Movie (1999)
- Kochira Katsushika-ku Kameari Kōen-mae Hashutsujo the Movie 2: UFO Shūrai! Tornado Daisakusen!! (2003)
- Yu-Gi-Oh! The Movie: Pyramid of Light (2004)
- Kawa no Hikari (2009)
- Yu-Gi-Oh!: Bonds Beyond Time (2010)
- Yu-Gi-Oh!: The Dark Side of Dimensions (2016)
- Survive! Inside the Human Body (2020) (animation cooperation with Toei Animation)
- Shinkai no Survival! (2021) (animation cooperation with Toei Animation)
