= Yu-Gi-Oh! Zexal II =

Japanese anime and manga series

遊☆戯☆王ZEXAL (Yūgiō Zearu)
- Manga
- Written by: Shin Yoshida
- Illustrated by: Naoto Miyashi
- Published by: Shueisha
- English publisher: Viz Media (Canada, US)
- Magazine: V-Jump
- English magazine: Weekly Shonen Jump Alpha
- Volumes: 2
- Anime television series

Yu-Gi-Oh! Zexal II
- Directed by: Satoshi Kuwahara
- Written by: Shin Yoshida
- Studio: Studio Gallop
- Original network: TV Tokyo
- Original run: October 7, 2012 – March 23, 2014

Yu-Gi-Oh! Zexal II (遊☆戯☆王ZEXAL II(セカンド), Yūgiō Zearu Sekando) is an anime and manga series. It is set in the near future as the sequel to Yu-Gi-Oh! Zexal. It is the seventh anime series overall in the Yu-Gi-Oh! franchise, and the fifth one produced by Nihon Ad Systems and broadcast on TV Tokyo. Following the end of the first series, Yuma and his friends now find themselves up against the evil forces of Barian World.

Like the original, this series is directed by Satoshi Kuwahara and animated by Studio Gallop. The anime aired in Japan on TV Tokyo from October 7, 2012, to March 23, 2014, in a different time slot from that of the original series.

The English-language adaptation, produced by Konami, began airing in North America on The CW's Vortexx programming block on August 17, 2013. Due to Vortexx's re-airing of Zexal II episodes, new episodes were moved to Hulu on July 14, 2014, beginning with Episode 114. Since then, most of the episodes aired on Mondays on Hulu. On December 14, 2014, the episodes on Hulu began to be uploaded on Sundays instead of Mondays, with the exception of December 6, 2014, which saw Episode 135 being uploaded on a Saturday, because the following Sunday was National Pearl Harbor Remembrance Day. The regular airing pattern was broken again when the series finale (Episode 146) aired on February 21, 2015, a Saturday, instead of on a Sunday.

Six pieces of theme music are used for the series: three opening and three ending themes. For episodes 74–98, the opening theme is "Unbreakable Heart" (折れないハート, Arenai Hāto) by Hideaki Takatori, while the ending theme is "Artist" (アーティスト, Ātisuto) by Vistlip. For episodes 99–123, the opening theme is "Dualism of Mirrors" (鏡のデュアルイズム, Kagami no Duaruizumu) by Petit Milady (Aoi Yuki and Ayana Taketatsu), while the ending theme is "Go Way Go Way" (ゴーウェイゴーウェイ, Gō Wei Gō Wei) by FoZZtone. For episodes 124–145, the opening theme is "Wonder Wings" (ワンダーウィングス, Wandā Wingusu) by Diamond☆Yukai, while the ending theme is *"Challenge the GAME" (チャレンジザゲーム, Charenji za Gēmu) by REDMAN. However, for Episode 146, the Season 3 Japanese opening theme was not used. For the Konami English dub version, the opening theme is "Halfway to Forever" for all episodes that air in the US.

== Plot ==
Yu-Gi-Oh! Zexal II takes place right after the first series. A messenger from the Barian World (Barian, who controlled Dr. Faker at the end of the first series), is aiming at taking the "Numbers" and Astral for himself. In order to protect Astral, Yuma, Kite and Shark fight the Barian threat together.

== Characters ==
- Yuma Tsukumo
- Astral
- Tori Meadows
- Reginald Kastle (also known as Shark)
- Rio Kastle
- Kite Tenjo
- Rei Shingetsu
- Gilag
- Fuma

== Music ==
Japanese opening theme 1: Unbreakable Heart

- Performer: Takatori Hideaki

Japanese ending theme 1: Artist

- Performer: Vistlip

== Episodes ==
The series consists of three seasons, with numbers following those of the original Zexal series:

- Season 4; episodes 74–98; first aired October 7, 2012 – April 7, 2013
- Season 5; episodes 99–123; first aired April 14 – September 29, 2013
- Season 6; episodes 124–146; first aired October 6, 2013 – March 23, 2014
