= Yu-Gi-Oh! Arc-V season 1 =

Season of television series

Yu-Gi-Oh! Arc-V
- Season 1
- Yuya(Lower right) and his Stargazer Magician(Left) and Timegazer Magician(Upper right).
- No. of episodes: 49

Release
- Original network: TV Tokyo
- Original release: September 22, 2014 – January 30, 2015

Season chronology
- ← Previous; Yu-Gi-Oh! Zexal; Season 6 Next → Season 2

Yu-Gi-Oh! Arc-V is the fourth spin-off anime in the Yu-Gi-Oh! franchise and the eighth anime series overall. It is produced by Nihon Ad Systems and broadcast by TV Tokyo. It is directed by Katsumi Ono and animated by Studio Gallop. Its plot focuses on Yuya Sakaki. Yuya is a boy seeking to become the greatest entertainer in Action Duels who brings forth a new summoning method to Duel Monsters known as Pendulum Summoning. The anime premiered in Japan on April 6, 2014, and released internationally by 4K Media Inc.

There are four music themes used for season 1: two openings and two endings. From episodes 1–30, the first opening theme is "Believe × Believe" by Bullet Train, while the first ending theme is "One Step" by P-Cute. From episodes 31–49, the second opening theme is "Burn!" by Bullet Train, while the second ending theme is "Future Fighter!" by Kenshō Ono and Yoshimasa Hosoya. For the English dub version, the opening theme is "Can You Feel the Power".

The English dub premiered episodes in Canada and Australia on Teletoon and 9Go! respectively. In the United States, Nickelodeon aired the season from September 2015 to July 2016, and Nicktoons aired the season from February 2016 to December 2017.

== Episode list ==
No.	English dub title / Japanese translated title	Directed by	Written by	Storyboarded by	Original release date	English air date (Note: Section reflects the first-time airing of the English dub in either Canada or Australia.)	American air date (Note: Section reflects the airing of the English dub in the United States.)
1	"Swing Into Action: Part 1" / The Trail of Light, Pendulum Summoning! Transliteration: "Hikari no Kiseki, Pendyuramu Shōkan!" (Japanese: 光の軌跡、ペンデュラム召喚！)	Katsumi Ono Animation director: Hidekazu Ebina	Tsutomu Kamishiro	Katsumi Ono	April 6, 2014	July 24, 2015 (Note: The English dub of Yu-Gi-Oh! Arc-V episodes 1–14 first premiered in Canada on Teletoon.)	February 21, 2016
Thanks to the development of the ARC System developed by the Leo Corporation, Duel Monsters are now given physical matter, giving birth to Action Duels. At Paradise City's You Show Duel School, a young duelist named Yuya Sakaki is approached with the opportunity to duel against the current Action Duel champion, The Sledgehammer. This brings back memories of three years ago when Yuya's father, Yusho, mysteriously disappeared before an important match with the Sledgehammer. After deliberation, Yuya shows up to face The Sledgehammer in an Action Duel. Sledgehammer quickly brings out his ace monster, Battleguard King, with Yuya evading his attacks by using Action Cards found across the environment. Yuya summons out Odd-Eyes Dragon to attack Sledgehammer but things turn around with his own Action Card that deals damage to Yuya. Just as Yuya is at his wit's end, he remembers encouraging words from his father as well as the pendulum his father left with him. Just then, his necklace glows and transformed some of his cards into Pendulum Monsters and allows him to perform a new summoning called Pendulum Summon. Yuya summons out several monsters, which includes an enhanced version of Odd-Eyes Dragon known as Odd-Eyes Pendulum Dragon.
2	"Swing Into Action: Part 2" / The Strongest Evolution Of Dueling!! Its Name is Action Duel; Transliteration: "Kettō Saikyō Shinka-kei!! Sono Na wa Akushon Dyueru" (Japanese: 決闘最強進化系！！その名はアクションデュエル)	Kimiharu Muto Animation director: Yuya Kawamura	Tsutomu Kamishiro	Katsumi Ono, Masahiro Takada	April 13, 2014	July 31, 2015	February 21, 2016
Using the effects of both his newly summoned monsters and the Pendulum Monsters he used to summon them, Yuya manages to defeat The Sledgehammer with his Odd-Eyes Pendulum Dragon and win the duel. Yuya's victory brings many potential new students to the You Show Duel School who wants to see the Pendulum Summon in action. Yuya participates in an exhibition Action Duel with his friend Zuzu Boyle. When Yuya attempts to perform a Pendulum Summon, he finds himself unable to summon the monsters he could before. Believing he needs to be in some kind of crisis, Yuya encourages Zuzu to attack him. Yuya once again fails to perform a Pendulum Summon and loses the duel. This leaves the spectators disappointed. After the duel, the spectators learn that Pendulum Summoning requires "Pendulum Cards" that only Yuya has and accuse him of cheating in his match against The Sledgehammer. All of them leave except for one young boy named Tate who stands by to show his support for Yuya and decides to join the school. This encourages Yuya to try to master the Pendulum Summon so he can once again receive the applause from before. Meanwhile, someone at Leo Corporation prepares to make a move on Yuya and his Pendulum Cards.
3	"Trade Bait: Part 1" / Dark Town: The Stolen Pendulum Summon!! Transliteration: "Daakutaun Ubawareta Pendyuramu Shōkan!!" (Japanese: ダークタウン 奪われたペンデュラム召喚！！)	Naoki Kotani Animation director: Momoko Makiuchi	Teru Arai	Kiyoshi Egami	April 20, 2014	August 7, 2015	February 28, 2016
As Yuya spends countless hours trying to perfect Pendulum Summoning, Sylvio Sawatari approaches him and Zuzu. Sylvio offers to take them and their friends, Tate, Frederick, and Allie, to Leo Institute of Dueling's center court to demonstrate the Pendulum Summon. Upon arriving at the center court, Sylvio steals two of Yuya's Pendulum Cards for himself and takes Zuzu and the kids' hostage. This forces Yuya to face him in an Action Duel to save them. As Yuya traverses the Prison Tower of Darkville in search of his friends, who are trapped on top of a large tower in the middle of the bridge. However, he ends up running up against Action Trap cards. Not only Yuya is put at a disadvantage, but Zuzu and the others at risk as the field gets destroyed. Meanwhile, Sylvio manages to get both of Yuya's Pendulum Cards in his hand. With guidance from Leo Corporation's CEO, Sylvio performs his own Pendulum Summon to bring out three Dart Strikers.
4	"Trade Bait: Part 2" / A Ray of Hope! Block Spider; Transliteration: "Hitosuji no Kibō!! Burokku Supaidaa" (Japanese: 一筋の希望！！ブロックスパイダー)	Kazuomi Koga Animation director: Hikaru Kodama, Ichizou Kobayashi, Rie Ogasawara, Rie Furuya	Teru Arai	Kumiko Habara	April 27, 2014	August 14, 2015	March 6, 2016
Reeling from Sylvio's ability to Pendulum Summon and hesitant to go for any more Action Cards, Yuya takes a lot of damage from Sylvio's attacks. Remembering his father's words and picking himself back up, Yuya summons Block Spider, the card Sylvio tossed out after deeming it worthless. Yuya uses a spell card to create a copy of Block Spider to use its ability is to prevent Sylvio from attacking. However, Sylvio uses a spell card, which negates his own Pendulum monsters abilities to destroy Yuya's copy. Yuya powers up Block Spider's defense, but Sylvio increases the attack of his Ultimate Dart Striker. Just as Sylvio attacks, Yuya activates a trap card that not only protects himself, but also lets him regain his Pendulum Monsters. Yuya uses his Pendulum Monsters to rescue Zuzu and the others and Yuya performs a Pendulum Summon. With the help from his Odd-Eyes Pendulum Dragon and Performapal monsters, Yuya wins the duel. As Sylvio tries to send his flunkies to attack Yuya in revenge, the flunkies are stopped by a boy named Sora Perse, who wants to become Yuya's apprentice. Meanwhile, the CEO of the Leo Corporation is interested in Yuya's dueling skills.
5	"Toying Around: Part 1" / Wannabe Apprentice!? A Strange Fanboy, "Sora Shiunin"; Transliteration: "Deshiiri Shigan!? Okashina Okkake "Shiun'in Sora"" (Japanese: 弟子入り志願！？ おかしなおっかけ 『紫雲院素良』)	Shigeki Hatakeyama Animation director: Masayuki Fujita, Shinichi Shigematsu, Kaito Senkouji	Gō Zappa	Yukio Nishimoto	May 11, 2014	August 21, 2015	March 13, 2016
Yuya continues to be hounded by Sora. Sora keeps asking to be Yuya's apprentice so that he can learn how to Pendulum Summon. After pressure from the others, Yuya agrees to duel against Sora on the condition of having Sora drop the subject of apprenticeship if Yuya wins. After evading Sora's attacks with some well-timed Action cards, Yuya performs a Pendulum Summon and gains the upper hand in the duel. However, Sora prepares to get serious and brings out his Fusion monster Frightfur Bear.
6	"Toying Around: Part 2" / The Innocent Toy: Death-Toy Scissor Bear; Transliteration: "Mujyaki na Omocha Desutooi Shizaa Beaa" (Japanese: 無邪気な融合玩具 デストーイ・シザー・ベアー)	Keiichirou Mochizuki Animation director: Toshi Shishikura	Gō Zappa	Noche Yagi	May 18, 2014	August 28, 2015	March 20, 2016
Sora has Frightfur Bear destroy Yuya's monsters and add their attack points to his own monster, before using multiple trap cards to overcome Yuya's Pendulum effects. Yuya becomes shocked when Frightfur Bear destroys Odd-Eyes Pendulum Dragon, however to his surprise, Odd-Eyes Pendulum Dragon returns to his Extra Deck instead of the Graveyard. This allows Yuya to Pendulum Summon it once more and wins the duel. Despite not being able to become Yuya's apprentice, Sora instead decides to become Yuya's friend and joins the You Show Duel School.
7	"Mr. Mystery" / Imperial Wrath of Treason - Dark Rebellion Xyz Dragon; Transliteration: "Hangyaku no Gekirin Dāku Riberion Ekushīzu Doragon" (Japanese: 反逆の逆鱗 ダーク・リベリオン・エクシーズ・ドラゴン)	Ryūta Yamamoto Animation director: Toshihiko Masuda	Mitsutaka Hirota	Katsumi Ono	May 25, 2014	September 11, 2015	March 27, 2016
While going out to fetch some ice cream with Allie, Zuzu overhears some LID students talk about how Sylvio is planning to take revenge against Yuya. Wanting to pay Yuya back for saving her, Zuzu follows them to Sylvio's hideout and challenges Sylvio to a duel. Before the duel can begin, a mysterious masked man appears who takes Zuzu's place in the duel. After the masked man sets five spell cards, Sylvio summons out Mobius the Mega Monarch to destroy them. The masked man activates the cards from the graveyard and uses them as monsters on his field to perform Xyz Summon Dark Rebellion Xyz Dragon. He uses all its Overlay effects to destroy Mobius and the effects of his attack prove real even outside of an Action Duel. After the masked man presses Sylvio about Duel Academy, Sylvio tries to activate a trap against him but is thwarted and loses the duel. As the man removes his mask that reveals a face that looks identical to Yuya, Zuzu's bracelet mysteriously glows during which time the man disappears. As Yuya arrives on the scene after being informed by Allie, Zuzu wonders just who that duelist was.
8	"Bad Business" / You Show Duel School's Crisis!! LDS Invasion; Transliteration: "Yūshō Juku no Kiki! ! Erudīesu Shūrai" (Japanese: 遊勝塾の危機！！LDS襲来)	Masahiro Takada Animation director: Hidekazu Ebina	Tsutomu Kamishiro	Masahiro Takada	June 1, 2014	September 18, 2015	April 3, 2016
Declan's mother and Leo Corporation's president, Henrietta Akaba, arrives in Paradise City, learning from Declan about how Yuya created Pendulum Summoning, as well as how a Xyz wielder injured Sylvio, who believes Yuya to be the culprit. Henrietta and Sylvio's flunkies show up at You Show Duel School to accuse Yuya of being the culprit and names Zuzu as a witness. Although Zuzu herself is uncertain about who she saw, she decides to believe in Yuya. As a result, Henrietta challenges the You Show Duel School to a three-against-three match between their respective students, threatening to absorb You Show into LID should they lose. With the students accepting the challenge, Yuya steps up first to face up against LID's top Xyz user, Dipper O'rion. Meanwhile, Declan sneaks into the You Show Duel School to spectate.
9	"Dueling with the Stars" / Judgment of the Stars! Xyz User "Hokuto Shijima"; Transliteration: "Hoshiboshi no Sabaki! Ekushīzu Tsukai "Shijima Hokuto"" (Japanese: 星々の裁き！エクシーズ使い「志島北斗」)	Matsuo Asami Animation director: Shinichirou Minami	Mitsutaka Hirota	Tsukasa Sunaga	June 8, 2014	September 25, 2015	April 10, 2016
As the match begins, Dipper immediately summons his Xyz monster, Constellar Pleiades, using its ability to remove Odd-Eyes from the field whenever Yuya summons it while also keeping him from obtaining any Action Cards. Yuya is pushed further into a corner when Dipper summons another Pleiades and upgrades his first one into Constellar Ptolemy M7. Yuya narrowly survives Dipper's attack thanks to an Action Card. Determined to show duels are more than just fights, Yuya switches up his usual Pendulum Summon routine and brings out Stargazer Magician, using its abilities to lead his team of monsters to victory. As Yuya celebrates, Zuzu starts to become more uncertain over whether or not Yuya is the duelist she encountered.
10	"You Show Em" / Knight of the Secret Stone! Fusion User "Masumi Kotsu"; Transliteration: "Hiseki no Kishi! Yūgō Tsukai "Kōtsu Masumi"" (Japanese: 秘石の騎士！融合使い「光津真澄」)	Kumiko Habara Animation director: Momoko Makiuchi	Gō Zappa	Kumiko Habara	June 15, 2014	October 2, 2015	April 17, 2016
Zuzu is still having doubts about Yuya's identity. She steps up against LID's Fusion specialist Julia Krystal. Julia quickly summons her fusion monster known as Gem-Knight Topaz. Zuzu destroys it with her Melodious monsters. Julia performs a graveyard fusion to summon her ace monster, Gem-Knight Master Diamond. Julia uses Gem-Knight Topaz's effect to deal extra damage to Zuzu. Zuzu attempts to grab an Action Card, but is led astray by a reflection and ends up losing the match. Not feeling interested in participating in the final match, Sora nominates Yuya's friend, Gong, to go up against LID's Synchro user Kit Blade. As the match begins, Kit brings out two Synchro Monsters known as X-Saber Souza and XX-Saber Gottoms.
11	""Going, Going, Gong"" / At One With The Sword! Synchro User "Yaiba Todo"; Transliteration: "Shinken Ittai! Shinkuro Tsukai "Tōdō Yaiba"" (Japanese: 身剣一体！シンクロ使い「刀堂刃」)	Naoki Kotani Animation director: Shinji Seya	Gō Zappa	Yukio Nishimoto	June 22, 2014	October 9, 2015	April 24, 2016
After taking a large amount of damage from Kit, Gong brings out Superheavy Samurai Big Benkei to destroy Gottoms. However, Kit brings out another Gottoms and Gong barely manages to survive the attack thanks to his Superheavy Samurai Soulfire Suit's ability. Kit uses Gottoms' ability to get rid of the cards in Gong's hand. As Kit strengthens his forces and summons yet another Gottoms, Gong waits for the right moment to use his monster effects from the graveyard to force the duel into a tie. When Henrietta refuses to leave the duel as a tie, she declares that Yuya and Julia start dueling, until Declan steps up to challenge Yuya for the tiebreaker.
12	"Battle Under the Big Top" / DDD: King of the Different Dimension; Transliteration: "Dīdīdī Ijigen no Ō" (Japanese: DDD 異次元の王)	Shigeki Hatakeyama Animation director: Masayuki Fujita, Shinichi Shigematsu, Kaito Senkouji, Michio Satou	Tsutomu Kamishiro	Tsukasa Sunaga	June 29, 2014	October 16, 2015	May 1, 2016
As the duel begins, Declan uses a risky series of spell cards that would deal great damage to himself on his next turn and brings out the Fusion monster Triple D Flame King Genghis. Instead of being dealt damage by his card effects on his next turn, Declan uses a trap card to negate their effects. After he uses it, Declan brings out the Synchro monster Triple D Gust King Alexander and the Xyz monster Triple D Wave King Caesar.
13	"Circus Surprise!" / Magical Sages Galilei & Kepler; Transliteration: "Madō Kenja Garirei & Kepurā" (Japanese: 魔導賢者ガリレイ、ケプラー)	Kimiharu Muto Animation director: Yuya Kawamura	Tsutomu Kamishiro	Kazuomi Koga	July 6, 2014	October 23, 2015	May 8, 2016
Yuya uses a Pendulum Summon to bring out Odd Eyes Pendulum Dragon and destroys all of Declan's monsters. However, he becomes shocked when Declan manages to perform his own Pendulum Summon to bring out three Triple D Doom King Armageddon that deals a lot of damage to Yuya. Yuya attempts a counterattack, but he is thwarted by Armageddon's effect. When Declan's turn arrives, his prototype Pendulum Monsters malfunction and disrupt the Pendulum Scale by limiting the monsters he can summon. Before Declan can take advantage of the situation, he suddenly receives urgent news from Claude and decides to forfeit the duel.
14	"The Show Must Go On" / Hotblooded!! Shuzo Theater; Transliteration: "Nekketsu!! Shūzō Gekijō" (Japanese: 熱血！！修造劇場)	Ryūta Yamamoto Animation director: Akiko Toyoda	Tsutomu Kamishiro	Shunsuke Machitani	July 13, 2014	October 30, 2015	May 15, 2016
Following his duel with Declan, Yuya becomes frustrated that Pendulum Summoning is no longer something only he can do. Meanwhile, Declan learns that an Xyz user injured one of LID's teachers, Marco and the time of the incident proves Yuya's innocence. When Skip notices Yuya is letting his anger get the better of him, he challenges Yuya to a duel using his father's favorite stage Showtime Street. As the duel begins, Yuya is reluctant to use Pendulum Summoning, leading to him being bested by Skip's Guts Master monsters. After telling Yuya about how Yusho dueled, Skip takes Yuya's Pendulum Cards to perform his own Pendulum Summon. Skip urges Yuya that if he cannot be the only one to use Pendulum Summoning then he should aim to become the best Pendulum user instead. He decides to end his turn and return the Pendulum Cards to Yuya, who remembers his entertaining spirit and wins the duel with his trademark style.
15	"In It to Win It" / Aim For The Junior Youth Championship!! Transliteration: "Mezase Junia Yūsu Senshuken!!" (Japanese: 目指せジュニアユース選手権！！)	Keiichirou Mochizuki Animation director: Toshi Shishikura	Tsutomu Kamishiro	Katsumi Ono	July 20, 2014	November 1, 2015 (Note: The English dub of Yu-Gi-Oh! Arc-V episodes 15–49 first premiered in Australia on 9Go!.)	October 2, 2016
After a brief encounter with Sylvio, who informs Yuya and Zuzu of another attack by an Xyz user, Yuya realizes that in order to become a pro duelist he needs to increase his winning percentage in order to qualify for the Junior Arc League Championship. However, Yuya struggles to find four other duelists willing to duel against him and refuses to ask Gong for help. He wants to become a pro with his own strength. The Sledgehammer's former manager, Nico Smiley, offers to give Yuya automatic entry into the championship, but Yuya once again refuses. He instead asks Nico to find four opponents to fight against him fairly. Meanwhile, as Julia, Kit, and Dipper try to investigate what happened to Marco, Zuzu asks Sora to teach her Fusion Summoning so she can grow stronger against Julia. The mysterious Xyz user appears before them, but before either Sora or Julia can duel against him, Zuzu's bracelet glows again and the duelist vanishes. As Yuya appeared, Julia accused him for siding with the mysterious duelist. As Zuzu attempted to calm Julia down, Sora managed to fool her by telling where the mysterious duelist went. Another unknown figure appears outside the LID building presumably beginning for an attack.
16	"Menu Venue: Part 1" / Genius Master Chef "Michio Mokota"; Transliteration: "Tensai Ryōrijin "Mokota Michio"" (Japanese: 天才料理人"茂古田未知夫")	Masahiro Takada Animation director: Hidekazu Ebina	Gō Zappa	Masahiro Takada	July 27, 2014	November 6, 2015	October 2, 2016
After having to skip breakfast due to his mother, Yoko, attempting to make a complicated recipe, Yuya meets up with his first opponent Reed Pepper. Sora begins his attempt to defeat six opponents in a row and earn a spot in the Junior Arc League Championship. As Yuya's duel begins, he is put under pressure by both Reed's Royal Cookpal monsters and his own hunger. Yuya attempts to Pendulum Summon his monsters. Reed uses his Cookpal's abilities to destroy them.
17	"Menu Venue: Part 2" / An Exciting Performance!! A Fulfilling Meal! Transliteration: "Gōkai Hirō!! Manpuku Zenseki!" (Japanese: 豪快披露！！ 満腹全席！)	Naoki Kotani Animation director: Toshihiko Masuda	Gō Zappa	Tsukasa Sunaga	August 3, 2014	November 8, 2015	October 9, 2016
As Reed continues to put pressure on Yuya with his Royal Cookpals, Yoko arrives to give Yuya a late breakfast, turning Reed's recipe into a pancake sandwich. This gives him the energy to grab an Action Card in time to survive Reed's attack. Yuya then brings out his entertainment dueling using his Pendulum Monsters to perform a game of chance, which works in his favor and wins him the duel.
18	"Trapped in a Card" / The Two Shadows of Rebellion; Transliteration: "Hangyaku no Futatsu no Kage" (Japanese: 反逆の2つの影)	Akira Shigino Animation director: Noh Gil-bo, Yuuki Iwai	Tsutomu Kamishiro	Tetsuaki Matsuda	August 10, 2014	November 8, 2015	October 9, 2016
Claude informs Declan of a large amount of Fusion activity in the city. Zuzu continues her Fusion lessons from Sora while thinking about the mysterious stranger. She worries about how and why her bracelet mysterious glows again just before Yuya arrives. Meanwhile, the masked stranger is suddenly transported near Leo Corporation where he encounters one of his acquaintances, Shay Obsidian. The next day, Declan and Henrietta discovers that Marco and Herk have been sealed inside cards and believe it to be a different culprit from the one who attacked Sylvio. Sylvio's father still believes Yuya to be the culprit and has some LID duelists chase after Yuya. However, Shay confronts them and summons an Xyz Monster, which traps the duelists inside cards. This knocks Yuya out in the process and by the time he wakes up, everyone is gone leading him to assume it was just a dream before going with Nico to face his next opponent.
19	"Quiz Quagmire: Part 1" / The Universe of Knowledge!! Eita Kyuando; Transliteration: "Chishiki no Uchū!! Kyūandō Eita" (Japanese: 知識の宇宙!! 九庵堂栄太)	Yoshitaka Fujimoto, Ryūta Yamamoto Animation director: Shuujirou Ami, Shinichirou Minami	Mitsutaka Hirota	Kenji Setou	August 17, 2014	November 14, 2015	October 16, 2016
Yuya faces his next opponent, quiz expert Pierre L'Supérieure, in a quiz-based Action Duel. Yuya struggles with the field's Action Cards, which all revolve around quiz questions, due to always ending up with the subjects he is worst at. As Pierre keeps gaining life points and Yuya keeps losing them, things worsen when Pierre activates an Action Card that brings the quiz field to a new stage.
20	"Quiz Quagmire: Part 2" / A Difficult Problem!? Attack Duel Quiz!! Transliteration: "Nanmon!? Atakku Dueru Kuizu!!" (Japanese: 難問!? アタックデュエルクイズ!!)	Shigeki Hatakeyama Animation director: Masayuki Fujita, Akihiko Oka, Shintarou Tsubota, Michio Satou	Mitsutaka Hirota	Tsukasa Sunaga	August 24, 2014	November 15, 2015	October 16, 2016
The next stage turns out to be a quick-fire quiz cart ride, leaving Pierre with more life points and Yuya with less. However, Yuya remains optimistic due to the interest shown by the crowd. He brings out his Pendulum Monsters but Pierre's quiz effects stops Yuya from using them. As Yuya is seemingly pushed into a corner, he manages to use a wrong answer to an Action Trap against Pierre to deal a large amount of damage him, before using his Pendulum Monsters and trap cards to win the duel.
21	"Beyond Belief" / Beyond the Pendulum; Transliteration: "Pendyuramu no Sono Saki ni" (Japanese: ペンデュラムのその先に)	Tetsuaki Matsuda Animation director: Noh Gil-bo	Tsutomu Kamishiro	Katsumi Ono	August 31, 2014	November 15, 2015	October 23, 2016
As Declan continues to work on his own Pendulum Summoning in preparation for the tournament, Yuya tries to figure out how to bring Pendulum Summoning to its next evolution. Meanwhile, Julia approaches Zuzu and Sora about the masked duelist that has come across the incident where the LID students disappeared. Julia prepares to duel against Zuzu but Shay suddenly confronts Julia and attempts to duel her. However, the other masked duelist, Yuto, shows up and knocks out Shay, who believed Zuzu to be a girl named Lulu, before warning Zuzu not to use Fusion Summoning. Zuzu's bracelet glows again and Yuto disappears once more just as Yuya arrives with Kit and Dipper. As the group disperses, Yuya comes across the Polymerization that Zuzu had accidentally dropped.
22	"A Date With Fate: Part 1" / The Fortunetelling Girl - Mieru Hōchun; Transliteration: "Uranai Shōjo Hochun Mieru" (Japanese: 占い少女 方中ミエル)	Kimiharu Muto Animation director: Yuya Kawamura	Gō Zappa	Shunsuke Machitani	September 7, 2014	November 21, 2015	October 23, 2016
Yuya hurriedly meets up with his third opponent, the fortuneteller girl Aura Sentia, who seems disappointed that he does not resemble her ideal 'fated one'. Aura gets an early lead on Yuya, who struggles against her flip-effect monsters and traps, before bringing out the Ritual Monster, Prediction Princess Tarotrei. As Tarotrei's abilities prove effective against Yuya's Pendulum Monsters, Aura predicts a future that could very well claim Yuya's life.
23	"A Date With Fate: Part 2" / Arcane Eyes; Transliteration: "Hijutsu no Manako" (Japanese: 秘術の眼)	Keiichirou Mochizuki Animation director: Toshi Shishikura	Gō Zappa	Kenji Setou	September 14, 2014	November 22, 2015	November 6, 2016
Gong starts training with Kit, while Sora manages to obtain his sixth victory and earn a spot in the Junior Arc League Championship. Meanwhile, Aura continues to put pressure on Yuya with both her fortune telling and her Flip Monsters, using an Action Card to place a lock on Yuya's deck. Despite a chandelier collapsing, Yuya manages to overcome Aura's prediction and grab an Action Card to remove the lock. Drawing Zuzu's Polymerization card, which he had accidentally put in his deck during the morning rush Yuya manages to fuse Odd-Eyes Pendulum Dragon and Stargazer Magician to summon Rune-Eyes Pendulum Dragon, using its power to defeat Aura. Returning the Polymerization card to Zuzu, Yuya becomes determined to seek out new ways of evolving Pendulum Summoning, but is first met with dubious affection from Aura.
24	"For Our Tomorrows" / The Wings of Rebellion - Raid Raptors; Transliteration: "Hangyaku no Tsubasa - Reido Raputāzu" (Japanese: 反逆の翼 レイド・ラプターズ)	Masahiro Takada Animation director: Hidekazu Ebina	Tsutomu Kamishiro	Masahiro Takada	September 21, 2014	November 22, 2015	November 6, 2016
Julia finds Shay and confronts him in a battle royal duel with Dipper and Kit. Zuzu spots Julia on her way back from Yuya's duel and attempts to follow her but is stopped by Yuto, who explains that they are trying to rescue Lulu, Shay's little sister, who has been captured by an enemy that uses Fusion Summoning. Meanwhile, Dipper, Kit, and Julia bring out their strongest monsters to clear Shay's field and hand, leaving him open for an attack. However, Shay manages to survive their attack and Xyz summons Raidraptor - Rise Falcon who absorbs the power of everyone's monsters and obliterates his opponents. As Yuto parts ways with Zuzu, Declan appears before Shay.
25	"Battle Between Buddies: Part 1" / Steadfast Resolve!! Noboru Gongenzaka; Transliteration: "Fudō no Kakugo!! Gongenzaka Noboru" (Japanese: 不動の覚悟！！権現坂昇)	Ryūta Yamamoto Animation director: Akiko Toyoda	Tsutomu Kamishiro	Yukio Nishimoto	September 28, 2014	November 28, 2015	November 13, 2016
Shay reveals that his goal was to lure Declan out to use as a bargaining chip to rescue Lulu, who was allegedly captured by his father, Leo. Declan believes his father would not care about him in such an event and gives Shay a condition to fulfill before he can duel against him. The next day, Yuya prepares to face his fourth and final opponent, who turns out to be Gong, in an all-or-nothing duel for championship entry without any of his supporters. As Yuya struggles to go all out against his best friend, Gong uses what he learned from Kit to summon the Synchro monster, Superheavy Samurai Warlord Susanowo.
26	"Battle Between Buddies: Part 2" / A New Boundary - Superheavy Koujin Susano-O; Transliteration: "Aratana Chihei Chō'omo Kōjin Susanō" (Japanese: 新たな地平超重荒神 スサノ―O)	Akira Shigino Animation director: Momoko Makiuchi, Michio Satou, Hiroaki Kawaguchi	Tsutomu Kamishiro	Shin Katagai	October 5, 2014	November 29, 2015	November 13, 2016
As Gong shows the power of his Susanowo, Yuya uses his Pendulum Summoning and Action Cards to protect himself from Gong's attacks. He manages to draw a new monster, Performapal Trump Witch and use its ability to Fusion Summon Rune-Eyes Pendulum Dragon. Though Gong manages to defend against Yuya's attack, Yuya uses an Action Card to draw a crucial card that allows him to perform another Fusion Summon. He fusion summons Beast-Eyes Pendulum Dragon and wins the match, earning him a place in the Arc League Championship. Meanwhile, at LID, Declan, who had arranged for Julia and the others to have their memories of Shay erased, thinks that Yuya might have the power to protect this world.
27	"Challengers Assemble" / Opening!! The Maiami Championship; Transliteration: "Kaimaku!! Maiami Chanpionshippu" (Japanese: 開幕！！舞網チャンピオンシップ)	Fumio Maezono Animation director: Toshihiko Masuda	Mitsutaka Hirota	Shunsuke Machitani	October 12, 2014	November 29, 2015	November 20, 2016
On the day of the Arc League Championship, Yuya briefly reminisces about his father before Yoko encourages him to join the others, including Gong who managed to qualify himself. As the opening ceremony begins, Yuya becomes surprised to see Shay among the LID competitors. During the opening ceremony, Yuya is chosen to give the opening statement, which he uses to express his desire to become a pro duelist and make more people love duels. With their first opponents announced, Yuya is to face against Sylvio, Zuzu against Julia, and Sora against Shay. In the Youth division, Frederick defeats his first opponent, while Allie is set to fight against a strange child seen accompanying Declan.
28	"Something's Fishy" / Ayu's Entertainment Aquarium; Transliteration: "Ayu no Entame Suizokukan" (Japanese: アユのエンタメ水族館)	Shigeki Hatakeyama Animation director: Kazuyuki Ikai, Michio Satou	Gō Zappa	Naoki Kotani	October 19, 2014	December 5, 2015	November 27, 2016
Allie begins her duel against LID's Riley and gains an early lead with her Aquaactress monsters. However, Riley causes problems with his Persona Shutter spells. Just as Allie starts to make a comeback, Riley brings out his Fusion Monster, Triple C Water Sword of Battle and defeats Ally. As Zuzu prepares for her duel against Julia, Sora feels a strange sensation when passing by Shay.
29	"Fusion Foes" / Fusing Melodious Divas! Transliteration: "Yūgōsuru Otohime!" (Japanese: 融合する音姫!)	Naoki Kotani Animation director: Shuujirou Ami, Shinichirou Minami	Gō Zappa	Katsumi Ono	October 26, 2014	December 6, 2015	December 4, 2016
Putting aside the mystery as to why Julia considers Shay an ally, Zuzu begins her duel against Julia. After Julia summons her Gem-Knight Master Diamond, Zuzu shows the results of her training and Fusion summons Schuberta the Melodious Maestra. Zuzu manages to defeat Julia's monster and banish one of her Fusion spell cards from the duel. However, Julia brings out her true ace, Gem-Knight Lady Brilliant Diamond, to destroy Melodious Maestra and put Zuzu on the defensive. Staking her duel on Julia's pride as a Fusion user, Zuzu manages to survive Julia's attack and Fusion summons Bloom Diva the Melodious Choir. She manages to stop Julia from obtaining an Action Card that would let her stop the attack and wins the duel. Afterwards, Julia gives Zuzu one of her monsters and encourages her to win the tournament.
30	"Gong the Strong" / The Tested Resolution of Steadfast Heart; Transliteration: "Tamesareru Fudō no Kokoro" (Japanese: 試される不動の心)	Tetsuaki Matsuda Animation director: Noh Gil-bo	Tsutomu Kamishiro	Kenji Setou	November 2, 2014	December 6, 2015	December 11, 2016
On the second day of the championship, Gong is set to duel against Grizzlepike Jones, a former student of Gong's family dojo who often bullied Yuya. However, Grizzlepike has his lackeys ambush Yuya in an attempt to weaken Gong's heavystrong spirit. Gong prepares to perform a Synchro Summon, but Grizzlepike manages to take control of his Tuner monster, further taunting him with the unknown circumstances Yuya is in. However, Zuzu manages to assure Gong that Yuya can handle himself. This allows Gong to place his faith in Yuya. Grizzlepike brings out his ace monster, Shaman Battleguard, to take control of Gong's monster, but Gong, supported by the safe arrival of Yuya, manages to bring out Susanowo and win the match.
31	"The Pendulum Swings Both Ways: Part 1" / The Howling Whirlwind - Yōsen Lost Tornado! Transliteration: "Unaru Senpū Yōsen Rosuto Torunēdo!" (Japanese: 唸る旋風 妖仙ロスト・トルネード！)	Keiichirou Mochizuki Animation director: Toshi Shishikura	Mitsutaka Hirota	Masayoshi Nishida	November 9, 2014	December 13, 2015	December 18, 2016
Yuya duels against Sylvio, who brings out a new Yousen deck to cause problems for Yuya. To Yuya's surprise, Sylvio brings out his own Pendulum monsters and Pendulum Summons Mayosenju Daibak, and uses its ability to return Yuya's Pendulum Cards and Monsters to his deck. Despite being backed into a corner, Yuya remains excited and pushes onward.
32	"The Pendulum Swings Both Ways: Part 2" / White-Hot Battle! Entertainment Duel Show; Transliteration: "Nessen! Entame Dueru Shō" (Japanese: 熱戦！エンタメデュエルショー)	Kimiharu Muto Animation director: Yuya Kawamura	Mitsutaka Hirota	Shunsuke Machitani	November 16, 2014	December 13, 2015	January 1, 2017
While searching for Action Cards, Yuya manages to use Sylvio's card effects against him, before managing to use an Action Card to escape his attack. As both duelist's efforts hype up the crowd, Yuya brings out Beast-Eyes Pendulum Dragon and wins the duel.
33	"Making the Cut: Part 1" / Future Metropolis Heartland; Transliteration: "Mirai Toshi Hātorando" (Japanese: 未来都市ハートランド)	Ryūta Yamamoto Animation director: Akiko Toyoda	Tsutomu Kamishiro	Tsukasa Sunaga	November 23, 2014	December 13, 2015	January 8, 2017
Shay and Sora finally come face-to-face in battle after Yuya's duel with Sylvio. As Sora entertains the crowd with his cute monsters, Shay starts talking about the battlefield he faced with his friends - something that confuses Sora. Sora Fusion Summons his ace monster, only to have it destroyed on Shay's turn, by his Xyz monster.
34	"Making the Cut: Part 2" / The Combining Demonic-Beast VS The Evolving Falcon; Transliteration: "Ketsugō Majū Bāsasu Shinka-suru Hayabusa" (Japanese: 結けつ合ごう魔ま獣じゅうVS進しん化かする隼はやぶさ)	Masahiro Takada Animation director: Hidekazu Ebina	Tsutomu Kamishiro	Masahiro Takada	November 30, 2014	December 20, 2015	January 22, 2017
As the duel begins to heat up, Sora continues to grow more anxious and malicious. As the Fusion Duelist attempts to Fusion Summon multiple Fusion Monsters such as Frightfur Leo, and Frightfur Sheep, Shay manages to successfully counteract the incoming attacks. Shay reveals his ability to Rank-Up his Raid Raptor - Rise Falcon into Raidraptor - Blaze Falcon. As Sora becomes more malicious than before, the two Duelists' past is revealed: Sora's people attacked Heartland City, Yuto, Shay, and Lulu's home. Being pushed to the edge by Shay's strategies, Sora Fusion Summons Frightfur Chimera, but Shay manages to Rank Up Raidraptor - Blaze Falcon even further to Raidraptor - Revolution Falcon, ending the duel with its destructive damage.
35	"Sora's Secrets: Part 1" / The Academia and The Resistance; Transliteration: "Akademia to Rejisutansu" (Japanese: アカデミアとレジスタンス)	Fujiaki Asari, Tadao Ookubo Animation director: Yuji Kokai, Michio Satou, Mio Usui	Tsutomu Kamishiro	Yūzō Satō	December 14, 2014	December 20, 2015	January 29, 2017
As Sora is kept in LID's recovery after his duel with Shay, Zuzu reveals everything she knows about Yuto, Shay, and their objective to Yuya and Gong. Meanwhile, Yuto appears before Sora and interrogates him on Lulu's whereabouts. Sora denies knowing anything but the probability of her being trapped in a card and demands to be taken to Shay. However, Yuto refuses and runs off when the guards in the hospital arrive, with Sora running after him in tow. Sora suggests that Yuto could save Lulu by destroying all the Fusion duelists leading them to a duel. Yuya shows up during the duel after searching for Sora, and attempts to stop the duel, to no avail. Angered by Yuto's motive, Yuya angrily decides to join the duel.
36	"Sora's Secrets: Part 2" / The Resonating Dragons; Transliteration: "Kyōmei Suru Ryū" (Japanese: 共鳴する竜)	Shigeki Hatakeyama Animation director: Michio Satou, Kazuyuki Ikai, Takao Inomae	Tsutomu Kamishiro	Kenji Setou	December 21, 2014	December 20, 2015	January 29, 2017
Yuya joins the Battle Royal duel and summons Odd-Eyes Pendulum Dragon, which causes both him and Yuto to feel a strange sensation when it resonates with his Dark Rebellion Xyz Dragon. Sora, further angered that Yuto was going easy on him, reveals that he is from another world known as the Fusion Dimension, while Yuto and Shay are from the Xyz Dimension. Sora attempts to summon his next Fusion monster, but is suddenly dragged back to the Fusion Dimension by his Duel Disk. Putting a stop to their duel, Yuya questions Yuto, who explains that his homeworld, the Xyz Dimension, was attacked one day by the Fusion Dimension, who turned its citizens into cards. Yuto further reveals there is also a Synchro Dimension, while Yuya's homeworld, Standard, is the one that connects them all. As Yuya vents that duels are supposed to be used for entertainment instead of war, a portal suddenly opens and a duelist appears, bearing the same face as Yuya and Yuto.
37	"A Dark Reflection" / The Destiny that Starts Moving; Transliteration: "Ugokidasu Unmei" (Japanese: 動き出す運命)	Fumio Maezono Animation director: Toshihiko Masuda	Tsutomu Kamishiro	Katsumi Ono	December 28, 2014	December 27, 2015	October 1, 2017
The turbo duelist, Yugo, challenges Yuto to a duel, quickly bringing out his Speed Roid Synchro Monsters. Yugo soon brings out Clear Wing Synchro Dragon, prompting Yuto to bring out Dark Rebellion Xyz Dragon to fight against it. Both Yuto and Yugo then get possessed by a desire to destroy, but Yuya stops Yuto from carrying out his attack. He fails to convince Yugo, who raises his Clear Wing's attack power and defeats Yuto. Having taken heavy damage from his duel, Yuto gives Yuya Dark Rebellion, before disappearing. Zuzu finds Yuya, but he had passed out after the duel, and Declan has Claude recover Yuto's duel disk and deck. At Duel Academy, the Professor sends Yuri, another person who resembles Yuya, to capture Zuzu.
38	"Warped Dimensions" / The Four Dimensions; Transliteration: "Yotsu no Jigen" (Japanese: 4つの次元)	Tetsuaki Matsuda Animation director: Noh Gil-bo	Tsutomu Kamishiro	Kazuya Iwata	January 11, 2015	December 27, 2015	October 8, 2017
With Yuya still unconscious following his encounter with Yuto and Yugo, Aura comes around to try to help wake him up, but Zuzu and Yoko convince her to return to the championships. After Yuya wakes up, he and Zuzu learn Aura was defeated in a single turn, while Riley defeated Frederick using Synchro Summoning. Yuya then explains to Zuzu what happened between him, Yuto, and Yugo, while Zuzu tells him about Lulu, the girl who resembles her. Determined to find answers, Yuya and Zuzu hope to talk with Shay, but are unable to meet up with him. They instead watch Kit's duel against Bandit Warrior Academy's Iggy Arlo, only to become shocked when Iggy uses physical violence to win against Kit. With Iggy confirmed as his next opponent, Yuya becomes determined to beat him in a duel that brings smiles.
39	"A Duel Personality" / Awakening of the Imperial Wrath; Transliteration: "Gekirin no Kakusei" (Japanese: 逆鱗の覚醒)	Keiichirou Mochizuki Animation director: Toshi Shishikura	Ryo Tamura	Kenichi Takeshita	January 18, 2015	December 27, 2015	October 15, 2017
After Gong wins his second round match, Yuya steps up to face Iggy, pitting his Dueltaining Style against Iggy's more violent methods. As Yuya brings out Beast Eyes Pendulum Dragon, Iggy recalls how his teacher, Ryozan Godagawa instructed him to be serious about victory instead of having fun. Iggy then brings out his Fusion monster, Idaten, the Conqueror Star, using violence to grab Action Cards to power up his monster, though Yuya manages to grab one himself to stay in the game. Cornered, Yuya sees a vision of Yuto merging with him and summons Dark Rebellion Xyz Dragon to win the duel. When Yuya regains his senses, he is met with concerned glares from the audience and disdain from Iggy.
40	"Stealth Warriors" / The Warrior of Academia; Transliteration: "Akademia no Senshi" (Japanese: はアカデミアの戦士)	Naoki Kotani Animation director: Lee Sung-jin	Ryo Tamura	Naoki Kotani	January 25, 2015	January 3, 2016	October 22, 2017
Declan learns Dipper has been turned into a card by a girl resembling Zuzu. As Zuzu participates in her second round match against idol Micky Starlett, Declan confronts her doppelganger, a member of Duel Academy, and duels against her partner, Barrett. While Barrett deals a lot of damage to Declan with his Beastborg Panther Predator, Declan uses a Pendulum Summon to bring out his D/D/D monsters and win the duel. With Zuzu victorious in her duel, Declan confronts her dimensional counterpart, Celina.
41	"Bracing for Battle" / The Land of Ambition - Duel Academia; Transliteration: "Yabō no Ji - Dyueru Akademia" (Japanese: 野望の地ち デュエルアカデミア)	Kimiharu Muto Animation director: Yuya Kawamura	Tsutomu Kamishiro	Tsukasa Sunaga	February 1, 2015	January 3, 2016	October 29, 2017
Declan and Celina recall that they once met each other three years ago when Declan accidentally stumbled into Duel Academy. Declan came across Celina and helped her to escape from some of Leo's guards, but they were soon caught by Leo, who took Celina away before explaining everything about the different dimensions to Declan before sending him back home. As Declan tries to reason with Celina, who wants to prove her worth to Leo by defeating Xyz Duelists, Barrett activates a device on his Duel Disk, alerting Duel Academy to his position before teleporting back there, while Celina takes her leave. Back at Duel Academy, Leo sends Sora on a mission to capture Celina. The next day, Yuya and the other remaining duelists learn that the championship's third round will be a Battle Royal across the entire city, in which duelists can obtain Pendulum Cards. However, it is a plan by Declan to distract the Junior Youth duelists while the Senior class fight against any invaders.
42	"Battle Fields" / Battle Royal Begins; Transliteration: "Batoru Roiyaru Shidō" (Japanese: バトルロイヤル始動)	Shinya Une Animation director: Kiyotaka Iida	Ryo Tamura	Kenji Setou	February 8, 2015	January 4, 2016	November 5, 2017
With the Battle Royal underway, Yuya comes up against a pair of duelists from Bandit Warrior Academy, Nagi and Taka, leaving him worried about losing control again. Meanwhile, Zuzu and Gong each end up facing against LID exchange students, Halil and Olga, which ends up becoming a Tag Duel when Zuzu inadvertently slips into Gong's match. As Yuya struggles against Nagi and Taka's rough play and Fusion monsters, he is suddenly aided by another duelist named Dennis MacField.
43	"Fire and Ice" / The Marvelous Exchange Student "Dennis"; Transliteration: "Kareinaru Ryūgakusei "Denisu"" (Japanese: 華麗なる留学生 「デニス」)	Kumiko Habara Animation director: Momoko Makiuchi	Ryo Tamura	Shunsuke Machitani	February 15, 2015	January 10, 2016	November 12, 2017
Dennis, an LID transfer student and Dueltainer from North America, joins Yuya as his tag partner, quickly bringing out his Xyz Monster, Performage Trapeze Magician, to put a stop to Nagi and Taka's effects. Meanwhile, Gong gets knocked out by Halil, but Zuzu manages to use her Pendulum Summon to bring out Bloom Diva and defeat both Halil and Olga. As Yuya nearly becomes swayed by the darkness again, Dennis calms him down, allowing him to summon Dark Rebellion Xyz Dragon, this time using it for the purpose of Dueltaining, and with help from Dennis, defeats both Nagi and Taka.
44	"Danger Zones" / Sora Shiun'in, Storms Forth!! Transliteration: "Shiun'in Sora, Shūrai!!" (Japanese: 紫雲院素良、襲来！！)	Ryūta Yamamoto Animation director: Michio Satou, Kazuyuki Ikai	Ryo Tamura	Kazuya Iwata	February 22, 2015	January 11, 2016	November 19, 2017
Halil and Olga are confronted by Reed, who is being assisted by Trout, who plans to take his Pendulum Cards once he tires himself out, while Zuzu comes across Dennis, who uses his Trapeze Magician's effects to win the duel. Meanwhile, Yuya comes across Shay, but before they can answer each other's questions, they come under attack by the Knights of the Duel Disks, who use the crossfire between themselves to damage them. Just then, Sora appears once again, having his Obelisk Force take care of the Knights while he confronts Shay for a rematch, while Celina appears before Zuzu and Dennis.
45	"Obelisk Assault" / Antithesis and Synthesis; Transliteration: "Sōkoku to Sōjō" (Japanese: 相克と相生)	Masahiro Takada Animation director: Hidekazu Ebina	Ryo Tamura	Masahiro Takada	March 1, 2015	January 11, 2016	November 26, 2017
Celina, believing Dennis to be a survivor of the Xyz Dimension, challenges him to a duel, while Sora and Shay begin their duel. Meanwhile, Yuya, shocked after seeing the Obelisk Force turn the Knights of the Duel Disks into cards, once again becomes possessed by Yuto's dark side and challenges the Obelisk Force. After Celina beats Dennis who did not want to use Xyz monsters and cause a misunderstanding, she and Zuzu are approached by the Obelisk Force, but they are aided by the arrival of Declan's team of Senior duelists. Meanwhile, Yuya brings out Dark Rebellion Xyz Dragon against the Obelisk Force, just as Gong and Aura come across him.
46	"Dragon's Vengeance" / The Rebellious Supreme King Black Dragon; Transliteration: "Hangyaku no Haō Kokuryū" (Japanese: 反逆の覇王黒龍)	Keiichirou Mochizuki Animation director: Toshi Shishikura	Tsutomu Kamishiro	Naoki Kotani	March 8, 2015	January 17, 2016	December 3, 2017
Yuya summons Odd-Eyes Pendulum Dragon and overlays it with Dark Rebellion Xyz Dragon to Xyz Summon Odd-Eyes Rebellion Dragon, using it to wipe out the Obelisk Force. Afterwards, Gong steps in to protect Yuya from a falling pillar, sending Aura to get Reed and Trout to hold him down. When they do so, Yuya starts to freak out. Using her fortune telling ability, Aura deduces there are two souls residing in Yuya's body with a third dark presence growing alongside them. After coming to his senses and learning about what he did from the others, Yuya suspects that Yuto has somehow become a part of him. Meanwhile, as Yugo shows up somewhere nearby, Zuzu speaks with Celina, questioning if she truly understands what Duel Academy is doing to the Xyz Dimension. Deciding that Celina should speak with Shay to get the full story, Zuzu swaps clothes with her so she can go find him, while Yuri appears before Dennis.
47	"Identity Crisis" / Yuri of The Cold Smile; Transliteration: "Tsumetai Emi no Yūri" (Japanese: 冷たい笑みのユーリ)	Fumio Maezono Animation director: Toshihiko Masuda	Tsutomu Kamishiro	Shunsuke Machitani	March 15, 2015	January 24, 2016	December 10, 2017
As Zuzu, disguised as Celina, is confronted by the Obelisk Force, they are dispersed by Yuri, who traps Halil and Olga into cards. Learning that he is the one who captured Lulu, as well as another girl named Rin, Zuzu confronts Yuri in a duel. Meanwhile, Yugo comes across the Obelisk Force overwhelming the Senior duelists and decides to fight against them, leading Declan to suspect that the Synchro Dimension is not their enemy like Shay stated. Just as Zuzu is pinned into a corner, Yuri was suddenly warped away by Zuzu's bracelet when Yugo arrives on the scene, with both Zuzu and Yugo being warped away when Yuya comes looking for her. Meanwhile, Shay is defeated by Sora just as Celina arrives on the scene, but she can't get the information from Shay when he's down.
48	"Battlefronts" / The Wounded Falcon; Transliteration: "Teoi no Hayabusa" (Japanese: 手負いの隼)	Yasuyuki Fuse Animation director: Lee Sung-jin	Ryo Tamura	Kazuya Iwata	March 22, 2015	January 18, 2016	December 17, 2017
While Tate faces against Riley in the Youth Class final, Celina, noticing Shay's injuries, helps him escape from Sora with help from the ninja duelists Sun Shadow and Moon Shadow. As Sun Shadow holds off Sora, Celina, Shay, and Moon Shadow are confronted by more Obelisk Force soldiers. Reed and Trout soon step in to join the latter duel, but they are both defeated and trapped in cards. As Sun Shadow is dealt the same fate by Sora, Yuya barely manages to hold back the darkness within him and confronts Sora, while Sylvio steps in on the other duel.
49	"Fighting for Fun" / Duels with Smiles; Transliteration: "Dyueru de Egao o" (Japanese: デュエルで笑顔を)	Kimiharu Muto Animation director: Yuya Kawamura	Ryo Tamura	Katsumi Ono	March 29, 2015	January 24, 2016	December 24, 2017
As Riley defeats Tate to win the Youth Class Championship, Gong, who mistakes Celina for Zuzu, joins the duel in order to give Shay two of Sylvio's Pendulum Cards, allowing him to Xyz summon Raidraptor - Revolution Falcon and defeat the Obelisk Force. Meanwhile, Yuya duels against Sora in the hopes of bringing back his true smile, bringing out Odd-Eyes Rebellion Dragon. Before he can attack, however, the Battle Royal reaches its time limit, putting an end to the duel. After Sora escapes and Celina's identity is revealed, Declan appears on the scene. Sylvio explains the Battle Royal was Declan's plan of recruiting duelists to become Lancers.
