= Yu-Gi-Oh! Zexal season 5 =

Yu-Gi-Oh! Zexal
- Season 5
- No. of episodes: 25

Release
- Original network: TV Tokyo
- Original release: April 14 – September 29, 2013

Season chronology
- ← Previous; Season 4 Next → Season 6

Yu-Gi-Oh! Zexal II (遊☆戯☆王ZEXAL II (セカンド), Yūgiō Zearu Sekando) is a sequel series to the Yu-Gi-Oh! anime television series Yu-Gi-Oh! Zexal and the seventh anime series overall in the Yu-Gi-Oh! franchise. It is produced by Nihon Ad Systems and TV Tokyo. Like the original, this series is directed by Satoshi Kuwahara and animated by Studio Gallop. The anime aired in Japan on TV Tokyo between October 7, 2012 to March 23, 2014, in a different time slot from that of the original series, while the English-language adaptation by Konami began airing in the United States on The CW's Vortexx programming block from August 17, 2013. Due to Vortexx's re-airing of Zexal II episodes, new episodes have been moved to Hulu since July 14, 2014, beginning with Episode 114. Since then, most of the episodes aired on Mondays on Hulu. On December 14, 2014, the episodes on Hulu began to be uploaded on Sundays instead of Mondays, with the exception of December 6, which saw Episode 135 being uploaded on a Saturday, because the following Sunday was National Pearl Harbor Remembrance Day. The regular airing pattern was broken again when the series finale (Episode 146) aired on February 21, a Saturday, instead of on a Sunday. Following the end of the first series, Yuma and his friends now find themselves up against the evil forces of Barian World.

Six pieces of theme music are used for the series: three opening and three ending themes. For episodes 74–98, the opening theme is "Unbreakable Heart" (折れないハート, Arenai Hāto) by Hideaki Takatori, while the ending theme is "Artist" (アーティスト, Ātisuto) by Vistlip. For episodes 99–123, the opening theme is "Dualism of Mirrors" (鏡のデュアルイズム, Kagami no Duaruizumu) by Petit Milady (Aoi Yuki and Ayana Taketatsu), while the ending theme is "Go Way Go Way" (ゴーウェイゴーウェイ, Gō Wei Gō Wei) by FoZZtone. For episodes 124–145, the opening theme is "Wonder Wings" (ワンダーウィングス, Wandā Wingusu) by Diamond☆Yukai, while the ending theme is *"Challenge the GAME" (チャレンジザゲーム, Charenji za Gēmu) by REDMAN. However, for Episode 146, the Season 3 Japanese opening theme was not used. For the Konami English dub version, the opening theme is "Halfway to Forever" for all episodes that air in the US.

== Episode list ==
| No. overall | No. in season | English dub title / Japanese translated title | Written by | Original release date | American air date |
|---|---|---|---|---|---|
| 99 | 1 | "A Duel in Ruins: Part 1" / "Restart the Airship! Aim for the Legendary Numbers!!"; Transliteration: "Hikōsen Saikidō! Densetsu no Nanbāzu wo Mazase!!" (Japanese: 飛行船再起動! 伝説のNo.を目指せ!!) | Shin Yoshida | April 14, 2013 | March 1, 2014 |
Frustrated by his loss against Yuma, Vector dives into the center of his planet, into the Sea of Ill Intent, in order to free the Barian God, Don Thousand. Then, Vector offers his life to Don Thousand, and uses his power to resurrect him. Don Thousand grants Vector his power in exchange for locating the seven Mythyrian Number cards that sealed him away long ago. To achieve his plans, Don Thousand merges with Vector, and briefly possesses him, while restoring his injured body. Vector uses Don Thousand's powers to revive Mr. Heartland as a fly, who had fallen into Barian World since the events of the previous series, and he manages to locate some of the Mythyrian Numbers with assistance from Mr. Heartland. Then, Vector uses his new powers to accelerate the healing of Alito and Girag. Meanwhile, Astral brings Yuma, Tori, Shark and Rio aboard the spaceship, informing them of the Numbers scattered across the world. He also shows Yuma a message from Kazuma, saying they will need to obtain the Mythyrian Numbers before the Barians can. As they head to their first location, they end up crashing into Dumon and breaking his Baria Lapis, who ends up in a jungle, injured and stuck in his human form. Yuma doesn't recognize him, and wants to help him out despite Shark's warning to not trust others so easily. They soon come across a temple. After inadvertently activating a trap, Shark and Dumon, who decides to use the alias Nash (the name of one of the 2 missing Barian Emperors), become separated from Yuma and the others, forced to go down separate paths. Yuma's group ends up in the Mythyrian Number's chamber, where it is protected by its guardian, Mach, who challenges Yuma to see if he is worthy. Making matters worse, the walls in the room Shark and Dumon are trapped in start closing in, requiring Yuma to win quickly in order to save them.
| 100 | 2 | "A Duel in Ruins: Part 2" / "Recollection Toward Antiquity - Dumon and the White Steed, A Legendary Vision"; Transliteration: "Inishie e no Tsuioku: Dorube to Hakuba Densetsu no Gen'ei" (Japanese: 古への追憶 ドルベと白馬伝説の幻影) | Shin Yoshida | April 21, 2013 | March 8, 2014 |
Yuma's attacks help open the way for Shark and Dumon to escape to safety, but come at the risk of receiving damage from Mach's traps and spells. After Yuma summons out Utopia, Mach brings out his own Number, Number 44: Sky Pegasus, which forces Yuma to take more damage to keep Utopia on the field. As Shark and Dumon make their way through each room, they find murals depicting a tragic legend about a white pegasus. Wanting to learn how the legend ends, Dumon urges Yuma to keep protecting Utopia, believing the legend is about protecting your friends. Although Dumon reveals his true form, after Shark's power repairs his Baria Lapis and he recovers his energy, Yuma chooses to protect Utopia. With Astral helping Yuma find a loophole in Mach's combo, Yuma manages to bring out Utopia Ray Victory and win the duel. Mach explains the rest of the legend before revealing himself as Number 44: Sky Pegasus and leaving himself in Yuma's care. Afterwards Dumon states he will settle things with Yuma next time. Yuma also finds a coin, which he believes is a memento from Kazuma.
| 101 | 3 | "The Dark Mist Rises: Part 1" / "The Cunning Vector - Astral VS Number 96"; Transliteration: "Kōkatsu-naru Bekutā: Asutoraru VS Nanbāzu Kyū-jū-roku" (Japanese: 狡猾なるベクター アストラルVSNo. 96) | Mitsutaka Hirota | April 28, 2013 | March 15, 2014 |
As Yuma and company head towards the location of the second sealed Number, Vector goes to see Number 96, who has been possessing a corrupt official, and convinces him to join up with him in his search for the Numbers. Arriving at an abandoned castle, Vector feels an odd connection to the place, like he had been there before. As Yuma's group arrives, Rio feels a similar sensation, speaking of a legend behind the castle. Vector and Number 96 reach the central colosseum, where Number 96 comes face to face with the Number's guardian. After accidentally triggering some traps, Yuma's group also wind up in the colosseum, where Vector arranges for a duel between Astral and Number 96, who had obtained the sealed Number. Number 96 instantly summons out Dark Mist whilst Astral summons Utopia, managing to use Dark Mist's ability against him. However, Vector reveals that damaging Number 96 activates some of the colosseum's deadly traps, which are aimed right at Yuma.
| 102 | 4 | "The Dark Mist Rises: Part 2" / "Realm of Chaos - Number 96, the Incarnation of Insanity!! Transliteration: "Kaosu no Ryōiki: Nanbāzu 96 Kyōki no Keshin!!" (Japanese: 混沌(カオス)の領域 No.96狂気の化身!!) | Mitsutaka Hirota | May 5, 2013 | March 22, 2014 |
Number 96 summons out the sealed Number he obtained, Number 65: Djinn Buster, managing to destroy Utopia deal a lot of damage to Astral by taking advantage of his wish not to hurt Yuma. As Astral turns to defensive play, Number 96 uses Barian's Force to evolve Djinn Buster into Chaos Number 65: King Overfiend, with Astral managing to survive by reviving Utopia. Receiving some encouragement from Astral and another one of Kazuma's coins, Yuma manages to use the trap aimed at him to his advantage and move to safety, allowing Astral to fight without hesitation. Astral summons Utopia Ray, but Number 96 uses Barian's Force again to upgrade Dark Mist to Chaos Number 96: Dark Storm, using its abilities to force the match into a draw. Vector then sets the castle to self-destruct as he and Number 96 escape, but Yuma and the others safely escape thanks to Kite's arrival. As Kite is informed of the situation, Girag and Alito awaken from their slumber.
| 103 | 5 | "Barian Vengeance: Part 1" / "Alito, the Silent Fighter - Reunion of the Passionate Duelists!"; Transliteration: "Chinmoku no Tōshi Arito Atsuki Dyuerisuto-tachi no Saikai!" (Japanese: 沈黙の闘士アリト熱き決闘者たちの再会！) | Gō Zappa | May 12, 2013 | March 29, 2014 |
Yuma and the others travel to Spartan City in Rome, where they learn of a duel tournament that Nistro is participating in, with Dextra serving as his manager. Nistro explains to Yuma how he and Dextra, who both grew up on the streets, found hope in Duel Monsters and wanted to give that same hope to children using his new "Star Voyager" persona. They then tell them about a legend involve a fighter who made friends with a rival, but was ultimately betrayed and executed, stating that the colosseum where the sealed Number lies is somewhere at the bottom of a lake. Later that night, Alito sets off some bombs to drain the lake, revealing the hidden colosseum. Alito enters the colosseum and defeats the sealed Number's guardian, claiming the Number just as Yuma and the others arrive at the colosseum. Alito, who seems to have no recollection of his friendship with Yuma, puts Nistro under his control and challenges Yuma and Dextra to a tag duel. Yuma summons out Utopia while Nistro summons Alito's new Number, Number 54: Lion Heart, dealing a large amount of damage to both Yuma and himself.
| 104 | 6 | "Barian Vengeance: Part 2" / "Be Revived! The Duelist Soul That Transcends Life!!"; Transliteration: "Yomigaere! Inochi o Koeshi Dyuerisuto Tamashii!!" (Japanese: よみがえれ！ 命を超えし決闘者魂!!) | Gō Zappa | May 19, 2013 | April 5, 2014 |
Dextra manages to protect Yuma after Alito forces Lion Heart's effect to activate again, bring Nistro's life points to 0, but he is revived due to Lion Heart's overlay effect which restores his life points, though this causes damage to his body. Alito then summons out Battlin' Boxer Cheat Commissioner, which again forces Utopia to fight against Lion Heart, but Dextra manages to redirect the attack to herself. Dextra then summons out her Xyz Monster, Photon Night Papilloperative, and, unable to prevent Alito from forcing her to fight against Lion Heart, puts all her feelings into her attack in the hopes that Nistro would remember his true desire, getting knocked out in the process. Nistro, regaining control of his fighting spirit, forgoes powering Lion Heart up with Barian's Force in order to fight Yuma fairly. Yuma then summons out Heroic Champion - Excalibur in order to fight a heated duel against him. When Alito tries to interfere and force Nistro to use Barian's Force, Yuma counters with a trap that knocks Alito out. When he is defeated, Alito experiences flashes of a past memory as the legendary fighter, while Nistro is freed from Barian control. Nistro then gives Yuma Lion Heart, before returning to the tournament scene to bring hope to children.
| 105 | 7 | "Put to the Test: Part 1" / "The Trial of the Galaxy-Eyes User! Kite's Do-Or-Die Duel"; Transliteration: "Garakushīaizu Tsukai e no Shiren! Kaito Kesshi no Dyueru" (Japanese: 銀河眼使いへの試練！カイト決死のデュエル) | Touko Machida | May 26, 2013 | April 12, 2014 |
While examining the two sealed Numbers they have obtained so far, Astral sees a visions depicting the people in their respective legends as Dumon and Alito. The group soon arrive at the base of a tall rock structure, the top of which lies the fourth sealed Number. As they start climbing the structure, they hear a strange roar that resonates with Kite's Galaxy-Eyes. They arrive at a strange dojo where they meet a man named Jinlon, who guards the sealed dragon Number. As Jinlon mentions that he knows of Mizar, Astral reveals his findings to the other, believing that the Barian Emperors were once human long ago. Kite then challenges Jinlon to a duel with their dragons on the line, with Jinlon summoning his number, Number 46: Dragluon, also summoning out Armed Protector Dragon, which keeps Dragluon from being attacked. When Kite summons Galaxy-Eyes Photon Dragon, its effects are negated by Dragluon, but Kite manages to use other means to destroy Armed Protector Dragon. As Mizar arrives at the bottom of the structure, Jinlon uses Dragluon's ability to summon Soul Drain Dragon, which uses its effect to add Kite's life point value to its attack points, raising its attack points to 8000. Soul Drain Dragon also has an effect that deals half of its ATK points as damage when it is destroyed.
| 106 | 8 | "Put to the Test: Part 2" / "The Legend of Mizar! The Divine Dragon That Became a Number"; Transliteration: "Mizaeru Densetsu! Nanbāzu Tonatta Kami no Ryū" (Japanese: ミザエル伝説！ No.となった神の龍) | Touko Machida | June 2, 2013 | April 19, 2014 |
Kite sacrifices some of his own life points, so that he can weaken Soul Drain Dragon and destroy it with Galaxy-Eyes Photon Dragon without losing to Soul Drain Dragon's effects. Jinlon then uses Dragluon's ability to take control of Galaxy-Eyes, but Kite manages to stop its attack and re-obtain Galaxy-Eyes so he can summon Neo Galaxy-Eyes Photon Dragon and defeat Jinlon. After the duel, Jinlon tells the others about Mizar's legend, who had formed a bond with Dragluon. When the village wanted to kill Dragluon to end the stormy weather (due to their belief that the dragon was responsible), Mizar prepared to sacrifice himself to save Dragluon. Although the villagers were initially convinced by Mizar, they later turned on them, and both Mizar and Jinlon were struck down by the king's army. Mizar overhears this legend and denies it, preparing to fight against Kite. However, their resonance causes the dojo to collapse, forcing Mizar to retreat. The dojo then disappears, with Jinlon leaving Dragluon in Astral's hands, warning them of a potential disaster that resonates all too well, who feels his mission is to destroy Barian World, but he decided to give the number to Kite, so that he can defeat Mizar, and to see who was the true Galaxy-Eyes Master.
| 107 | 9 | "Furry Fury" / "Yuma Confused!? The Unreliable Account of Girag, the Tanuki"; Transliteration: "Bakasareta Yūma!? Giragu Tanuki no Kawazan'yō" (Japanese: 化かされた遊馬!? ギラグ狸の皮算用) | Yasuyuki Suzuki | June 9, 2013 | April 26, 2014 |
Yuma returns home and watches a news report about a stone statue of Commander Kiraku from the Warring States period discovered at Roku's Duel Sanctuary. The statue bears a striking resemblance to Girag, and believing there is a Number card to be found, Yuma, Astral, and Tori go check it out. Girag, having returned to the human world, also sees the report and gets to the statue before Yuma and his friends. A Number card pops out of the statue, but then a tanuki spirit emerges from the statue and possesses Girag. When Yuma and company finally arrive, they are surprised to see that the tanuki spirit, Ponta, is in control of Girag's body while Girag himself is in the statue. Ponta is in fact the Number's Guardian, and Yuma challenges him to a duel with the Number card and Girag at stake. After Xyz Summoning Number 64: Ronin Raccoon Sandayu, Ponta temporarily possesses Yuma and proceeds to waste all of Yuma's cards in a series of misplays. Nonetheless, Yuma manages to win the duel and claim the Number. It is revealed that in the legend of Girag, Ponta was just a stray animal picked up by Girag and had the ability to transform himself into a duplicate of Girag, allowing Ponta to act as his double for battles. However, Ponta was betrayed by Girag, who sent him away before a big battle, making Ponta angry, and his spirit had been sealed in the statue ever since then. Girag defends himself by saying that he drove Ponta away because he knew he was entering a losing battle, and he wanted Ponta to stay alive. Girag, in spirit form, then bursts out of the statue and swallows Ponta, reclaiming his body. He then departs back to Barian World, with Ponta's spirit resting inside him.
| 108 | 10 | "A Sea of Troubles: Part 1" / "Temptation from the Bottom of the Sea! Shark's Dream-like Memory"; Transliteration: "Kaitei kara no Sasoi! Shāku Mugen no Kioku" (Japanese: 海底からの誘い！シャーク夢幻の記憶) | Shin Yoshida | June 16, 2013 | May 3, 2014 |
As the gang arrive at the location of the final two sealed Numbers, above a stormy ocean, Rio suddenly starts hearing a voice in her head and is drawn towards the ocean; and she dives into it. Shark, Yuma and Astral dive in after her and wind up in a mysterious world underneath the sea, following Rio's footprints to a strange labyrinth, where Shark becomes separated from the others. Arriving at a temple in the center of the labyrinth, Shark finds Rio, who has been possessed by the Number's guardian, Abyss, and is challenged to a duel. Sharks summons out Black Ray Lancer while Abyss summons out Gorgonic Guardian, using its powers to destroy Black Ray Lancer. When Abyss projects a strange light, Shark sees a vision in which he and Rio were rulers of an ancient civilization, which was attacked by Vector. As Shark's life points are knocked down to 200, Dumon appears before Yuma and Astral.
| 109 | 11 | "A Sea of Troubles: Part 2" / "Shark VS the Raging Waterfall God - Abyss! Collision, the Two Numbers!!"; Transliteration: "Shāku VS Gekirōshin Abisu! Gekitō, Futari no Nanbāzu!!" (Japanese: シャークvs激瀧神アビス！激突、2体のNo．！！) | Shin Yoshida | June 23, 2013 | May 10, 2014 |
Dumon states his desire to find the two missing Barian Emperors, Nash and Marin, while Astral responds that his mission is to destroy the Barian World. Meanwhile, Shark encounters more visions while Abyss summons his namesake, Number 73: Abyss Splash. Astral and Dumon are brought into one of Shark's visions, in which Rio sacrificed herself to help Shark fight off Vector, leading to the realization that both Shark and Rio are the missing, former Barian Emperors. As Abyss attempts to sacrifice Rio in the same manner, Yuma manages to save her while Shark becomes able to summon Rio's Number card, Number 94: Crystal Zero, and win the duel. As Shark receives Abyss' card, everyone returns to the ship, but Rio remains unconscious.
| 110 | 12 | "A World of Chaos: Part 1" / "The Three Worlds That Will Be Destroyed! Ultimate, Rampaging Number 96!!"; Transliteration: "Horobi-yuku Santsu no Sekai! Kyūkyoku Bōsō Nanbāzu Kyūjūroku!!" (Japanese: 滅びゆく3つの世界！ 究極暴走No．96！！) | Mitsutaka Hirota | June 30, 2013 | May 17, 2014 |
Number 96 finally obtains and masters the power of Chaos, and as a result, he begins to destroy Astral World, Barian World, and the Human World. Don Thousand informs Vector that Number 96 had gone out of control, and that his newfound powers are allowing him to destroy Barian World along with Astral World. As a result, Vector head off to find Number 96. As various supernatural disasters occur across the Earth, Number 96 appears and brings Yuma, Astral, Tori, Shark, and Kite to a Chaos Field, forcing Yuma and Astral into a Sphere Field that barrages them with lightning. As the duel goes on, Number 96 manages to summon Chaos Number 96: Dark Storm, before using the field spell Chaos Field to steal Yuma's Number 69: Heraldry Crest and Number 92: Heart-eartH Dragon, and rank them up into Chaos Number 69: Heraldry Crest of Horror and Chaos Number 92: Heart-eartH Chaos Dragon. This allows Number 96 to effectively negate the effects of Yuma's Utopia Ray Victory. Number 96 then uses the ability of Heart-eartH Chaos Dragon, which prevents Yuma from activating card effects of cards on the field until the End Phase, making Yuma unable to avoid Number 96's attacks.
| 111 | 13 | "A World of Chaos: Part 2" / "Moment of Doomsday! Bonds Entrusted to a Partner"; Transliteration: "Shūen no Toki...! Aibō ni Takushita Kizuna" (Japanese: 終焉のとき．．．！ 相棒に託した絆) | Mitsutaka Hirota | July 7, 2013 | May 24, 2014 |
After barely managing to survive Number 96's attack, with the ability of Bacon Saver, Astral helps Yuma with his duel. Using the special ability of Heart-eartH Chaos Dragon, Dark Mist raises his Life Points to 7,500, while Yuma only has 500 Life Points remaining. Meanwhile, Vector watches on from a hidden vantage point, believing that Yuma and Astral would lose the duel, although it would be interesting to watch it happen. Being unwilling to give up, Yuma and Astral merge into ZEXAL II, and bring out Utopia Ray and two new Zexal Weapons: Sleipnir Mail and Asura Blow. This allows Yuma to overpower Number 96's monsters and defeat him. In a last-ditch attempt, Number 96 uses the last of his strength to try and take over Astral's body, but Astral chooses to sacrifice himself to destroy Dark Mist, leaving Yuma horrified. This action severely drains Astral and forces him to retreat to Astral World, and he entrusts Yuma with the Numbers they obtained, before fading away. Then, Astral takes the Emperor's Key with him, before sending Yuma and his friends back to Earth, causing Yuma to scream in despair.
| 112 | 14 | "Memory Thief: Part 1" / "A Pure-Hearted Duelist! Start Up the Chronomaly!!"; Transliteration: "Junshin-naru Dyuerisuto! Ōpātsu Shidō!!" (Japanese: 純真なる決闘者！ 先史遺産｣始動！！) | Gō Zappa | July 14, 2013 | May 31, 2014 |
As Yuma remains reclusive following Astral's disappearance, Don Thousand gives Vector the remnants of Number 96's power, who is revealed to be a shard of Don Thousand's malice that was trapped inside of Astral, during Astral's ancient battle with Don Thousand. Number 96 is also revealed to be a "Forbidden Number." Then, Don Thousand reveals his plan to use his new powers from Number 96 to make a Fusionizer, to merge the Human World with Barian World, once the level of evil in the Human World reaches that of Barian World. This would increase Don Thousand's power by a thousandfold, giving him enough power to destroy Astral World. In order to create more Fuzionizers, Don Thousand emerges from Vector's body in a black energy form resembling his true likeness, and fuses Vector to his throne, in order to concentrate their energy on making more Fusionizers. Then, using his newly enhanced powers, Vector returns Mr. Heartland to his human form, grants him four Fake Number cards, and gives him a group of 3 Barian servants, who, along with Mr. Heartland, make up the Fearsome Four of the Dark Dueling World. Mr. Heartland distributes 3 of the Number cards among the other members of the Fearsome Four, while he keeps Number 1. Soon afterwards, a servant named Erazor begins attacking duelists and stealing their memories. When Tori and the others try looking into the incident to cheer Yuma up, they are caught by Erazor, who steals their memories and uses them as bait to lure Yuma into a duel. Heartland attempts to coerce Yuma into giving up his Numbers to save his friends, but he remains determined to cling onto the Numbers that Astral had left him. He is soon joined by Trey, who offers to support Yuma in a 2-on-1 duel against Erazor. However, Mr. Heartland uses Don Thousand's power (which manifests in a crest-like form of Don Thousand's Barian Emblem) to activate a field effect, which puts Yuma and Trey at a distinct disadvantage against Erazor, by reducing their Life Points to 2000, and raising Erazor's Life Points to 8000. Then, Erazor shows his true Barian form: a large cicada-like creature.
| 113 | 15 | "Memory Thief: Part 2" / "The Power of a New Hope!! Combination of Friendship - Atlandis Utopia"; Transliteration: "Atarashiki Kibō no Chikara!! Yūjō Gattai Atorantaru Hōpu" (Japanese: 新しき希望の力！！ 友情合体｢アトランタルホープ) | Gō Zappa | July 21, 2013 | June 7, 2014 |
Erazor quickly summons out the Number he received from Vector, Number 3: Cicada King, using its ability to negate a combo Yuma had planned to use with Utopia. Trey summons Number 33: Chronomaly Machu Mech, managing to damage Erazor with help from Yuma's cards. However, Erazor deals a lot of damage to Trey, who took the hit for Yuma, and activates a trap that would ensure Yuma's victory on his next turn. As Yuma struggles to think of a comeback, Tori and the others regain some of their memories and show their support, reminding Yuma that he is not alone. Yuma then sets the stage for Trey to summon Number 6: Chronomaly Atlandis, equip it with Utopia, and use Atlandis to win the duel, destroying Erazor and returning Tori and the others to normal. Afterwards, Yuma decides to give Cicada King to Trey as a sign of their friendship.
| 114 | 16 | "Tentacles of Terror: Part 1" / "Duelists of Sorrow: The Gimmicks Puppets' Rumble of Darkness!!"; Transliteration: "Hiai-naru Dyuerisuto "Gimikku Pappetto" Meidō" (Japanese: 悲哀なる決闘者地獄人形ギミックパペット冥動!!) | Yasuyuki Suzuki | July 28, 2013 | July 14, 2014 (Hulu) |
As Yuma, Tori and Trey decide to visit the hospital, they discover another one of Heartland's lackies, Chironex, who sucks Rio's blood and poisons her, putting her in a critical condition, before heading off in search of Shark. Meanwhile, Shark heads towards his family's mansion, in order to try and regain his memories, recalling the tragic day in which a traffic accident took his parents' lives. He arrives at his old house, where he recalls a scar he got while protecting Rio from a falling suit of armor. Shark is then confronted by Chironex, who reveals he has poisoned both him and Rio, and must be defeated in order to obtain the antidote. Quattro, who had learned about Rio's condition, steps in to join Shark in a duel against Chironex. Chironex summons Number 4: Stealth Kragen, using its ability to deal damage to Shark. Quattro then summons Number 15: Gimmick Puppet Giant Grinder, using its ability to destroy Stealth Kragen. However, Chironex still has a trick up his sleeve.
| 115 | 17 | "Tentacles of Terror: Part 2" / "Shark and Quattro's World-Shaking Mayhem!! The Hell-Shark Tag Team"; Transliteration: "Shāku to IV Tenka Sōrin!! Jigoku Zame Taggu" (Japanese: シャークとIV 天下騒乱!! 地獄ザメタッグ) | Yasuyuki Suzuki | August 4, 2013 | July 21, 2014 (Hulu) |
Chironex uses Number 4: Stealth Kragen's ability to summon two Kragen Spawns, bringing back Stealth Kragen and another Spawn when Quattro uses Giant Grinder's ability again. As the poison continues to worsen Shark's condition, Quattro summons Number 40: Gimmick Puppet of Strings, but it has its abilities blocked by Chironex's trap card. After receiving encouragement from Quattro to stand up, Shark manages to summon Abyss Splash and works together with Quattro to defeat Chironex. This allows Shark and Rio to be cured of the poison, and earns Quattro the Stealth Kragen card. Before disappearing, Chironex remembers that he was responsible for the car accident that killed Shark's family. However, he muses that Shark and Rio shouldn't be here, because he remembered that they were killed in the accident. Afterwards, Shark finds an emblem in his family's mansion, similar to the one he saw in his visions of his past life (the Barian Emblem), implying that he and Rio had died in that accident.
| 116 | 18 | "Now or Never: Part 1" / "Stern Duelists: The Dyson Sphere Upheaval!!"; Transliteration: "Reigen Dyuerisuto "Daison Sufia" Gekidō!!" (Japanese: 冷厳なる決闘者 ダイソンスフィア激動!!) | Shin Yoshida | August 11, 2013 | July 28, 2014 (Hulu) |
As Yuma continues to put on a brave face around the subject of Astral, Flip builds a memorial for him to show everyone's respects. However, Yuma still refuses to acknowledge Astral's death, even when the others try to confront him about it. Just then, Kite appears before him, stating that they may find a way to bring Astral back, if they can find a way into Astral World to search for the Numeron Code. He states that they could use the coins left by Kazuma, which are believed to be fragments of Astrite crystals, to power an interdimentional gate to Astral World. He takes Yuma and Tori to the location of an interdimensional gate he and Quinton built, where they manage to convince Quinton to let him go, despite the dangers involved. As the preparations are made to send Yuma to Astral World, Heartland's third minion, Scritch, attempts to interrupt the experiment, challenging Kite and Quinton to a handicap duel. Quinton and Kite summon Number 9: Dyson Sphere and Galaxy-Eyes Photon Dragon respectively, while Scritch summons his monster, Number 2: Ninja Shadow Mosquito, which is hidden from sight.
| 117 | 19 | "Now or Never: Part 2" / "Kite In a Frenzy: The Ultimate Teacher-And-Student Bloody Battle!!"; Transliteration: "Gyakujyō no Kaito Kyūkyoku no Shitei Kessen!!" (Japanese: 逆上のカイト 究極の師弟血戦!!) | Gō Zappa | August 18, 2013 | August 4, 2014 (Hulu) |
After Kite and Quinton discover that Ninja Shadow Mosquito is literally as small as a mosquito, Scritch uses its ability to make Galaxy-Eyes Photon Dragon attack Quinton. Meanwhile, Kite is affected by a mosquito bite he received from Scritch during his journey, which is causing him to confuse his allies with his enemies. Recalling his training days with him, Quinton manages to awaken Kite's inner fire and break him free of the Scritch's influence. With help from Quinton, Kite manages to power up Galaxy-Eyes Photon Dragon and defeat Scritch, and obtain his Number card. After the duel, the interdimensional gate is fully charged, allowing Yuma to go to Astral World.
| 118 | 20 | "Mission: Astral World, Part 1" / "Deity of the Holy Azure Land - Eliphas, the Radiant"; Transliteration: "Aoki Seichi no Kami Senkō no Erifas" (Japanese: 青き聖地の神 閃光のエリファス) | Shin Yoshida | August 25, 2013 | August 11, 2014 (Hulu) |
Arriving in Astral World, Yuma is guided by a Rainbow Kuriboh Kazuma built towards a strange town, where he is attacked by a strange being named Eliphas. Escaping thanks to Rainbow Kuriboh, Yuma receives a message from Kazuma, telling him to save Astral. Meanwhile, Shark, who is conflicted between his childhood memories and Barian memories, is approached by Dumon, who reveals to Shark that he is the leader of the Seven Barian Emperors, Nash. Yuma is rescued by an Astral being named Ena, who states Yuma can use the power of Chaos to restore the damage done to Astral World, which was banished from Astral World long ago, and help its people fight against Eliphas, who has put their world under his control. With Ena's help, Yuma finds where Astral is resting, with Eliphas standing in his way. As the two begin to duel, Eliphas summons his Xyz monster, New Order 4: Etheric Anubis, while Yuma summons Utopia. However, Yuma is soon pushed into a corner when Eliphas exhibits the ability to perform a Shining Draw.
| 119 | 21 | "Mission: Astral World, Part 2" / "Transcendental State! The Threatening Double Rank-Up!! Transliteration: "Kōjigen no Kyōchi! Kyōi no Daburu Ranku Appu!!" (Japanese: 高次元の境地！ 脅威のダブル・ランクアップ！) | Shin Yoshida | September 1, 2013 | August 18, 2014 (Hulu) |
Eliphas uses his Shining Draw to draw Rank-Up-Magic Astral Force, and double ranks up Anubis to New Order 6: Etheric Apophis, while also putting pressure on Yuma by holding Ena and the others hostage. Yuma manages to draw Numeron Force and bring out Utopia Ray Victory to destroy Apophis, but Eliphas activates a trap to summon out New Order 8: Etheric Sebek, before using the effects of his 2 Astral Force cards to upgrade it to New Order 10: Etheric Horus and New Order 12: Etheric Mahes respectively, summoning the previous two forms alongside it. Eliphas uses his monsters to bring Yuma's life points down to 100, and is poised to wipe out the rest of Yuma's life points with his next attack. Meanwhile, Dumon shows Shark the rest of Nash's memories as he battled against Vector to avenge Rio's death, eventually coming across an orphaned girl that looked just like Rio.
| 120 | 22 | "Mission: Astral World, Part 3" / "Clash of the Two Kings! An Ancient Duel - Shark VS Vector"; Transliteration: "Nidaiō Gekitō! Inishie no Kettō Shāku VS Bekutā" (Japanese: 二大王激突！ 古の決闘シャークVSベクター) | Shin Yoshida | September 8, 2013 | August 25, 2014 (Hulu) |
Yuma is protected from Eliphas' attack thanks to Rainbow Kuriboh. Meanwhile, Shark continues living through Nash's memories, where he looks after the orphaned girl, Iris, as he goes into battle against Vector. There, Shark is contacted by Rio's spirit, who reminds him his fate is his own to make. Going on his own to face up against Vector, Nash arrives at the labyrinth he visited before and confronts him in a Shadow Game using stone tablets. Vector deals a lot of damage to Nash with his Gorgonic Guardians, but Nash manages to summon Abyss Splash and defeat him. After the duel, however, Nash discovers his men, along with Iris, had all been killed as a result of the shadow game, their souls ascending to Barian World. Having seen all of this, Shark comes to accept the truth that he is Nash, bitterly realizing that Yuma, Astral, and Kite would soon become his enemies. Back in Astral World, Eliphas makes preparations for summoning his Rank 13 monster.
| 121 | 23 | "Mission: Astral World, Part 4" / "Inheritor of the Light!! King of Wishes, Utopia Roots"; Transliteration: "Hikari o Tsugumono!! Kibō'ō Hōpu Rūtsu" (Japanese: 光を継ぐ者！！ 希望皇ホープルーツ) | Shin Yoshida | September 15, 2013 | September 1, 2014 (Hulu) |
Eliphas summons the powerful Rank 13 monster, New Order 13: Etheric Amon, using its effect to take cards from Yuma's deck and turn them into overlay units, growing more powerful. This in turn causes the interdimensional transporter to overload, forcing Tori, Kite, and Quinton to leave it behind. Yuma manages to defend himself by banishing Utopia Ray Victory and defending himself with Rainbow Kuriboh, resummoning Utopia at the end of the turn. Refusing to give up, Yuma gains the power to perform his own Shining Draw, drawing the card Rank-Down-Magic Numeron Fall. Eliphas recalls Astral using a Shining Draw to end the battle with Don Thousand thousands of years ago, which sealed away Don Thousand and cost Astral much of his power, while also splitting the original Astral World into the present-day Astral World and Barian World (the original Astral World's Chaos energy was also banished to the present-day Barian World during this event). Eliphas is shocked that Yuma was able to perform such a feat. Yuma tells Eliphas that his bond with Astral allowed him to do this, and he uses Rank-Down-Magic Numeron Fall to 'rank down' Utopia and devolve him into a new form, Number 39: Utopia Roots. Then, Yuma uses the effects of Utopia Roots to steal Ethric Amon's overlay units and power it up to incredible amounts, defeating Eliphas. To show their gratitude, the people of Astral World lend their power to revive Astral, and purge him of the corruption that resulted from Vector's mechinations, reuniting him with Yuma. After Astral receives a card from Eliphas, Yuma and Astral return home, with Kazuma and Mira watching from afar. Meanwhile, Dumon takes Shark and Rio to Barian World, where Shark comes to accept his destiny as its protector, with Rio choosing to follow him. Determined not to let tragedies befall his people again, Nash betrays Yuma and his friends in favor of Barian World. Meanwhile, Don Thousand and Vector have finished making the Fusionizers, and Don Thousand tells Vector that it is time to put his plan into motion.
| 122 | 24 | "Assimilation: Part 1" / "A Sign of the World's Collapse!! Mr. Heartland's Grand Revolt"; Transliteration: "Sekai Kanraku no Zenchō!! Misutā Hātorando no Daihanran" (Japanese: 世界陥落の前兆！！ Mr．ハートランドの大反乱) | Mitsutaka Hirota | September 22, 2013 | September 8, 2014 (Hulu) |
Vector is freed from Don Thousand's throne, and sends a million fake Number cards to Earth from the Fusionizers, turning anyone who picks one up into a servant of Barian World. Vector uses his power to choke Mr. Heartland, and threatens him to recover the 3 Number cards that he lost; if he succeeds, Vector will give him a spot among the Seven Barian Emperors, but Vector warns him that this is his last chance. Don Thousand claims that this will be the end of both Earth and Astral World, and that after the destruction of both worlds, he would claim the Numeron Code for himself. Mr. Heartland appears before Kite and the others, revealing he intends to use the energy from the Fake Numbers to connect Earth with the Barian World. Barian World begins to merge with the Human World, and energy from Barian World begin to appear in the form of red spheres. Also, the Earth becomes saturated in Barian energy. Flip picks one of these cards up himself (Number 10: Dark Illumiknight), hoping to become stronger and help Yuma. The others realize that someone had taken a fake Number, and Quattro realizes that Flip had taken one of the fake Numbers, even as he falls under the control of Barian World. Soon afterwards, Flip and other people begin to vanish, and are absorbed into the conduit between Barian World and the Human World. Kite realizes that once the Human World has been merged with Barian World, the Barians would be able to attack Astral World directly, just like how Hart was able to attack Astral World. Desiring to stop Mr. Heartland, Kite challenges Heartland to a duel. Heartland summons the number he received from Vector, Number 1: Infection Buzz King, and deals a lot of damage to Kite. At the same time, Kite also reels from the effects of the fake Number 2: Ninja Shadow Mosquito he got from Scritch. Back in Barian World, Shark and Rio appear before Vector as the 2 leaders of the Seven Barian Emperors, Nash and Marin (in their true Barian forms), much to Vector's shock and horror. Kite falls unconscious from the damage he took, and Mr. Heartland claims Fake Numbers 3 and 4 from both Trey and Quattro. Just then, Yuma and Astral return to face Mr. Heartland.
| 123 | 25 | "Assimilation: Part 2" / "The Hero's Triumphant Return! Carrying On a Friend's Will!!"; Transliteration: "Yūsha no Gaisen! Tomo no Ishi o Hikitsugu!!" (Japanese: 勇者の凱旋！ 友の意志を引き継げ！！) | Mitsutaka Hirota | September 29, 2013 | September 15, 2014 (Hulu) |
Nash and Marin overlook Vector's past aggressions and unites the Barian leaders. Dumon reveals that Nash and Marin had lost all of their memories after ending up on Earth, prior to their return. Vector nearly panics, thinking that with Nash's memories back, Nash had returned to kill him, but Don Thousand tells Vector to calm down, telling him that Vector's blood was not on Nash's mind. In an effort to prove his loyalty, Nash gives Vector the permission to kill him if he sensed any hint of betrayal. Nash then gives each of the Barian Emperors new powers and tells Vector not to underestimate Yuma and Astral. Then, following Vector's advice, Nash decides that it is time for the Seven Barian Emperors to attack. Yuma takes Kite's place in the duel with Kite's remaining 1750 Life Points as Heartland reveals his true fly-like form, revealing that he had been reborn as a Barian. Yuma summons Utopia and manages to destroy Infection Buzz King, but Heartland summons several Infection Bug Tokens in its place, which he uses to destroy Utopia and deal damage to Yuma. However, Yuma summons Galaxy-Eyes Photon Dragon and fuses with Astral to create a new ZEXAL transformation, ZEXAL III, allowing him to summon Zexal Server - Banish Sage and equip it to Galaxy-Eyes. Yuma uses ZEXAL III's power of "Zexal Field" to counter Mr. Heartland's Barian Field. Banish Sage's effect allows Galaxy-Eyes to Banish all of the Bug Tokens and defeat Mr. Heartland, causing him to revert to his human form. Then, Fake Numbers 1, 2, 3, and 4 surround Mr. Heartland and burst into black flames, burning him alive, even as he begs Vector for mercy. Then, the flames briefly turn red and coalesces into the form of Don Thousand, whom Astral recognizes, before vanishing. After Mr. Heartland's defeat, all of the remaining Fake Numbers are destroyed as well. As Yuma learns of Flip's disappearance, Tori notices something awry with the large flow of energy coming from Barian World and alerts her friends/comrades present, who turn to view multiple bolts of red lightning and a pillar of light/energy, proof that Barian World was planning to unite Barian and Earth. Yuma states that there is only one thing to do, and says, "We gotta take down the Barians."
