= Yu-Gi-Oh! Zexal season 6 =

Yu-Gi-Oh! Zexal
- Season 6
- No. of episodes: 23

Release
- Original network: TV Tokyo
- Original release: October 6, 2013 – March 23, 2014

Season chronology
- ← Previous; Season 5 Next → Yu-Gi-Oh! Arc-V; Season 1

Yu-Gi-Oh! Zexal II (遊☆戯☆王ZEXAL II (セカンド), Yūgiō Zearu Sekando) is a sequel series to the Yu-Gi-Oh! anime television series Yu-Gi-Oh! Zexal and the seventh anime series overall in the Yu-Gi-Oh! franchise. It is produced by Nihon Ad Systems and broadcast on TV Tokyo. Like the original, this series is directed by Satoshi Kuwahara and animated by Studio Gallop. The anime aired in Japan on TV Tokyo between October 7, 2012, to March 23, 2014, in a different time slot from that of the original series, while the English-language adaptation by Konami began airing in the United States on The CW's Vortexx programming block from August 17, 2013. Due to Vortexx's re-airing of Zexal II episodes and subsequent shutdown in September 2014, new episodes moved to Hulu since July 14, 2014, beginning with Episode 114. Since then, most of the episodes aired on Mondays on Hulu. On December 14, 2014, the episodes on Hulu began to be uploaded on Sundays instead of Mondays, with the exception of December 6, which saw Episode 135 being uploaded on a Saturday, because the following Sunday was National Pearl Harbor Remembrance Day. The regular airing pattern was broken again when the series finale (Episode 146) aired on February 21, 2015, a Saturday, instead of on a Sunday. Following the end of the first series, Yuma and his friends now find themselves up against the evil forces of Barian World.

Six pieces of theme music are used for the series: three opening and three ending themes. For episodes 74–98, the opening theme is "Unbreakable Heart" (折れないハート, Arenai Hāto) by Hideaki Takatori, while the ending theme is "Artist" (アーティスト, Ātisuto) by Vistlip. For episodes 99–123, the opening theme is "Dualism of Mirrors" (鏡のデュアルイズム, Kagami no Duaruizumu) by Petit Milady (Aoi Yuki and Ayana Taketatsu), while the ending theme is "Go Way Go Way" (ゴーウェイゴーウェイ, Gō Wei Gō Wei) by FoZZtone. For episodes 124–145, the opening theme is "Wonder Wings" (ワンダーウィングス, Wandā Wingusu) by Diamond☆Yukai, while the ending theme is *"Challenge the GAME" (チャレンジザゲーム, Charenji za Gēmu) by REDMAN. However, for Episode 146, the Season 3 Japanese opening theme was not used. For the Konami English dub version, the opening theme is "Halfway to Forever" for all episodes that air in the US.

== Episode list ==
No. overall	No. in season	English dub title / Japanese translated title	Written by	Original release date	American air date
124	1	"Battle with the Barians" / "The Seven Barian Emperors! Soldiers of the Crimson World!!"; Transliteration: "Barian Nanakō! Akaki Sekai no Senshi!" (Japanese: バリアン七皇！ 紅き世界の戦士！！)	Gō Zappa	October 6, 2013	September 22, 2014 (Hulu)
Nash and the other Barian Emperors appear before Yuma and the others, revealing Nash's true allegiance. When Yuma denies this, his key and Nash's Barian Emblem suddenly react to each other, allowing both of them to see each other's memories. When Yuma falls unconscious as a result, Yuma and the others are barely able to escape, thanks to the arrival of Kaze and Roku, who use smoke bombs to cover their escape. Then, Anna, Nelson, Nistro, Dextra, Roku, and Kaze decide to duel against the Barian Emperors. They are joined by Bronk, who stays behind to face Marin, and Quattro, who faces Nash. Vector, however, decides to watch the duels from a rooftop, in order to gauge Nash's power. Marin summons her Over-Hundred Number, Number 103: Ragnazero. Quattro summons his Giant Grinder, but Nash summons his new Number card, Number 101: Silent Honor ARK, using its effect to turn Giant Grinder into one of its Overlay Units. Quattro manages to reclaim Giant Grinder and uses Rank-Up-Magic Argent Chaos Force, a card his brother gave to him, to evolve Giant Grinder into Chaos Number 15: Gimmick Puppet Giant Hunter, and destroy ARK. However, Nash and the other Barian Emperors use their power to perform a simultaneous Chaos Draw, which shocks Vector.
125	2	"Fight for a Friend" / "The Immortal Spearman - Silent Honor Dark Knight"; Transliteration: "Fujimi no Sōjutsushi Sairento Onāzu Dāku Naito" (Japanese: 不死身の槍術士 S・H・Dark Knight)	Gō Zappa	October 13, 2013	September 29, 2014 (Hulu)
The Seven Barian Emperors use their Chaos Draw to draw Rank-Up-Magic The Seventh One, which allows them to evolve their Over-Hundred Numbers into Chaos Numbers, from their field, Graveyard, or Extra Deck. The Emperors use Rank-Up-Magic The Seventh One to summon their Chaos Over-Hundred Numbers, including Chaos Number 102: Archfiend Seraph, and Chaos Number 103: Ragnafinity. Then, with their new Chaos Numbers, they are able to defeat their opponents. Nash uses Rank-Up-Magic The Seventh One to evolve ARK into Chaos Number 101: Silent Honor DARK. Nash uses DARK's ability to turn Giant Hunter into one of its Overlay Units, before attacking Quattro directly. Quattro manages to survive Nash's attack, and uses Argent Chaos Force to evolve his Gimmick Puppet of Strings into Chaos Number 40: Gimmick Puppet of Dark Strings, and destroys DARK in an attempt to reach Shark's feelings. However, Nash uses DARK's effect to bring it back and restore his own life points, before using DARK's ability again to turn Dark Strings into its Overlay Unit. Nash then enrages Quattro by showing him footage of his allies as they are defeated by the Barian Emperors one by one and their souls sent to Barian World.
126	3	"Farewell for a Friend" / "Farewell, My Friend... Feelings Fallen into the Void!!"; Transliteration: "Saraba Tomo yo... Kokū e Chiru Omoi!!" (Japanese: さらば友よ．．． 虚空へ散る想い！！)	Gō Zappa, Shin Yoshida	October 20, 2013	October 6, 2014 (Hulu)
Quattro brings out Number 88: Gimmick Puppet of Leo, and uses Argent Chaos Force once more to evolve it into Chaos Number 88: Gimmick Puppet Disaster Leo. Then, Quattro uses Disaster Leo's effect to inflict 4000 points of damage to Nash, reducing his life points to 1300. However, Nash uses a trap card to attach one of Chaos Number 101's Overlay Units to Disaster Leo, preventing Quattro from scoring an automatic win with its effect. Nash uses a chain of effects to power up DARK to 3800 attack points, even though his life points are reduced to 900 in the process. Then, Nash destroys Disaster Leo and defeats Quattro, whose soul is sent to Barian World after having a few final words with Nash. Meanwhile, Yuma regains consciousness and learns what happened to his friends. As Yuma tries to think of a way to stop the Barians without fighting his friend, Nash, Astral suggests that they may be able to return them to normal if they defeat Don Thousand. However, Kite chooses not to get involved, while Trey and Quinton become determined to avenge Quattro. With Yuma and Astral preparing to head off to Barian World alone, Cathy encourages Tori to go with them, while Trey and Quinton prepare to face off against Mizar.
127	4	"Settling the Score, Part 1" / "The Unflinching Brother Combo - Tachyon Dragon Imprisoned!! Transliteration: "Fukutsu no Kyōdai Konbo Takion Doragon Yūhei!!" (Japanese: 不屈の兄弟コンボ 時空竜幽閉！！)	Mitsutaka Hirota	October 27, 2013	October 13, 2014 (Hulu)
Mizar takes on both Trey and Quinton at once. Vector uses the diversion of the Emperors to his advantage, putting Alito and Girag under Don Thousand's mind control, as part of his plan to overthrow Nash, even while Alito calls Vector insane for resurrecting Don Thousand. Meanwhile, Caswell and Cathy tell Yuma's family where he has gone. Quinton immediately brings out Dyson Sphere, the massive monster's presence alerting Dumon and Marin to the duel. Mizar, despite being prevented from summoning his Chaos Number immediately, tells Marin and Dumon to go after Yuma and Kite, forcing the brothers to trap the three Emperors in a Sphere Field. Mizar summons Number 107: Galaxy-Eyes Tachyon Dragon and destroys Dyson Sphere. In their respective locations, Kite and Yuma dwell on Trey and Quinton's situation. Girag alerts Nash to Yuma's departure in order to trick him, and Nash promptly returns to Barian World to pursue him. Trey summons Atlandis and attempts to use Dyson Sphere to gain its ATK, but Mizar uses a trap to negate this effect. But the brothers have planned for this, and use Argent Chaos Force, ranking Atlandis up to Chaos Number 6: Chronomaly Chaos Atlandis and attacking Tachyon Dragon. Mizar's trap is destroyed to preserve Tachyon Dragon, allowing Trey to equip Tachyon Dragon to Chaos Atlandis, denying Mizar the conditions necessary to use The Seventh One, enraging him.
128	5	"Settling the Score, Part 2" / "Tears of Separation... The Tyranny of Neo Galaxy-Eyes Tachyon Dragon!!"; Transliteration: "Wakare no Namida... Neo Gyarakushīaizu Takion Doragon no Bōi!!" (Japanese: 別れの涙．．． 超銀河眼の時空龍の暴威！！)	Mitsutaka Hirota	November 3, 2013	October 20, 2014 (Hulu)
Quinton brings back Dyson Sphere and uses Argent Chaos Force to evolve it to Chaos Number 9: Chaos Dyson Sphere, before using Chronomaly Chaos Atlandis to bring Mizar's life points to 1. However, Mizar than uses a trap to survive their attack, and return Tachyon Dragon to his side, allowing him to use The Seventh One to bring out Chaos Number 107: Neo Galaxy-Eyes Tachyon Dragon, which prevents Trey and Quinton from defending themselves. Meanwhile, Girag captures Nash during their travel and brings him to Don Thousand, saying that he couldn't allow Nash to duel Yuma, "in the name of Don Thousand." Before their defeat, Trey and Quinton reveal to both Mizar and Yuma that their mission was to buy time for Kite to head towards the moon, so that he can search for the Numeron Code and fulfill The Legend of the Dragons of Light and Time. Saying their goodbyes to Yuma, the two are defeated by Mizar as he destroys their Chaos Numbers, and their souls are sent to Barian World. Mizar decides to head to the moon to confront Kite.
129	6	"Fists of Fury, Part 1" / "The Shadow of Chaos - Yuma VS Alito the Tenacious Fighter"; Transliteration: "Konton no Kage Yūma VS Shūnen no Tōshi Arito" (Japanese: 混沌の影 遊馬VS執念の闘士アリト)	Shin Yoshida	November 10, 2013	October 27, 2014 (Hulu)
Yuma and Astral are confronted by Alito, who challenges them to a duel with Tori's life at stake. As Alito uses The Seventh One to bring out Chaos Number 105: Battlin' Boxer Comet Cestus, Astral realizes that the Barian numbers were created by Don Thousand, and he is controlling Alito. Don Thousand reveals his presence to Yuma and Astral, and reveals that by collecting the 7 Mythyrian Numbers, they released the seal placed on him. He also reveals to them that he revived the 7 humans depicted in the ruins of the Mythyrian Numbers as the Seven Barian Emperors, because their souls were connected to their corresponding Mythyrian Numbers. Despite taking a lot of damage from Alito's attack, Yuma senses that his passionate dueling still resides within him. Wanting to bring Alito back to his old self, Yuma summons Heroic Champion - Excalibur, but his attack is stopped by Alito, who then summons Number 80: Rhapsody in Berserk, which he equips to Comet Cestus. Managing to defend against his attacks, Yuma prepares to bet on Number 54: Lion Heart to awaken Alito's memories, despite the dangers that would be involved.
130	7	"Fists of Fury, Part 2" / "Fiery Fist of Awakening!! Alito's Time of Revival"; Transliteration: "Kakusei no Netsuken!! Arito Fukkatsu no Koku" (Japanese: 覚醒の熱拳!! アリト復活の刻)	Shin Yoshida	November 17, 2013	November 3, 2014 (Hulu)
Yuma brings out Lion Heart, which reawakens Alito's memories of his past life, in which he was allegedly betrayed by his best friend and sentenced to death. Yuma then uses Lion Heart's power to have Alito discard Rhapsody in Berserk, dispelling Don Thousand's hold on him. Although no longer under control and freeing Tori, Alito demands that they see their duel through to the end as he still holds hatred over his past. Alito brings back Rhapsody in Berserk and uses Barian's Force to evolve it into Chaos Number 80: Requiem in Berserk and equip it to Comet Cestus to negate Lion Heart's effect, but Yuma manages to survive thanks to his trap card. Feeling Alito may be under a different curse altogether, Astral encourages Yuma to destroy Comet Cestus with Lion Heart and win the duel. This in turn shows Alito the true nature of his memories, in which Don Thousand had taken control of Alito's friend, causing him to turn against Alito so he could be revived as a Barian Emperor. Having learned the truth, Alito decides to join Yuma's team and help them pursue Vector who, at that point, appears before Marin and Dumon.
131	8	"Power Play" / "Vector's Scorn - The Sundered Seven Emperors!! Transliteration: "Bekutā no Chōshō Hikisakareta Nanakō!!" (Japanese: ベクターの嘲笑 引き裂かれた七皇！！)	Gō Zappa	November 24, 2013	November 10, 2014 (Hulu)
Don Thousand, whose power resides in Vector's body, reveals that he had revived the Seven Barian Emperors for his own gains: to become his "food" in order to restore him to his full power. Although Dumon and Marin tell Vector that this means that he will also become Don Thousand's "food," Vector doesn't care, because he insists that because he has merged with Don Thousand, he has become a god. Vector, now wielding Don Thousand's power, challenges Dumon and Marin to a duel, using the power he absorbed from Number 96 to summon out Dark Mist. Marin and Dumon summon out Number 103: Ragnazero and Number 102: Star Seraph Sentry respectively, using their combined abilities to destroy Dark Mist. However, Vector summons Number 43: Manipulator of Souls, and equips Dark Mist to it. Then, Vector recovers his life points using the continuous spell Don Thousand's Throne, which draws its power from Nash, who is held captive within an energy barrier. This effect combo in turn increases Manipulator of Souls's attack points, and deals damage to Marin. Vector then reveals he had attempted to kill Nash and Marin before, by throwing them into a pit. However, they were rescued by Abyss, who had their memories removed and their souls reborn in the human world, in the bodies of Shark and Rio. Marin, enraged by Vector's words, uses Rank-Up-Magic The Seventh One to bring out Chaos Number 103: Ragnafinity. Meanwhile, Yuma's group is stopped in its tracks by Girag.
132	9	"Barian VS Barian" / "My Body as a Shield! Dumon's Final Vow!"; Transliteration: "Wagami wo Tate ni! Dorube Saigo no Chikai!" (Japanese: 我が身を盾に！ ドルベ最後の誓い！)	Gō Zappa	December 8, 2013	November 17, 2014 (Hulu)
Marin attempts to wipe out Vector's life points with Ragnafinity, but he manages to survive her attack, restoring his life points back to normal with Don Thousand's Throne, though she does manage to put a stop to his effect combo. Vector then reveals he had been drawing life from Nash, enraging Dumon who brings out Chaos Number 102: Archfiend Seraph, but his attack also fails to bring Vector's life points to zero. When Vector then activates a trap, Evil 1, which threatens to wipe both Dumon and Marin's life points, Dumon activates the trap Sacred Shield, which saves Marin and powers up her Ragnafinity, but at the same time results in his own defeat. Then, Dumon reverts to his human form and vanishes, as his soul is absorbed into Marin. Angered by Vector's actions, Marin attacks him with Ragnafinity. Meanwhile, Alito decides to face up against Girag to put an end to his brainwashing. Girag brings out Chaos Number 106: Giant Red Hand and Number 58: Burner Visor (which he equips to Giant Red Hand), which has Don Thousand's power, and deals a lot of damage to Alito.
133	10	"Vector the Victor" / "A Goodbye is Only For a Moment... The Sad Fate of the Siblings"; Transliteration: "Wakare wa Setsuna... Kanashiki Kyōdai no Shukumei" (Japanese: 別れは刹那．．． 哀しき兄妹の宿命)	Gō Zappa, Shin Yoshida	December 15, 2013	November 24, 2014 (Hulu)
Marin's attempt to defeat Vector fails when he activates a hidden effect of Don Thousand's Throne, protecting himself from damage and allowing him to Rank-Up Manipulator of Souls into Chaos Number 43: High Manipulator of Chaos. From his prison, Nash begs Vector to spare Marin and kill him instead, but he is horrified when Vector decides to kill Marin. Vector then uses the abilities of High Manipulator of Chaos to defeat Marin. Before disappearing, Marin's spirit appears to Nash, telling him to live on without her and become stronger. Then, Vector absorbs Marin's and Dumon's souls, along with their power. Meanwhile, Alito summons Number 64: Ronin Raccoon Sandayu, freeing Ponta from Girag's body and he activates the counter trap Last Counter to power up Sandayu. Then, Sandayu destroys Giant Red Hand, allowing Girag to recover his true memories, and freeing him from Don Thousand's influence. However, Alito loses his last life points from the effects of Last Counter, and disappears as a result, leaving behind his soul, which is absorbed by Girag. Girag declares that he will never forgive Vector or Don Thousand for what they did. Just then, Vector attacks Yuma with High Manipulator of Chaos, but Girag sacrifices himself to protect Yuma. As a result, Vector is able to absorb the souls of Girag and Alito, along with Ponta's, giving Vector even more power. Enraged by Marin's death, Nash breaks out of his imprisonment, regains his Barian form, and goes to confront Vector. This causes Vector to leave Yuma and head back to Barian World. Meanwhile, Kite lands on the Moon and discovers various stone tablets that rise from its surface, but he is confronted by Mizar. Kite begins to explain his research on the legend of the Galaxy-Eyes Dragons, revealing that the battle mentioned in the legend was actually a ritual necessary for breaking a spell cast by the original Galaxy-Eyes Dragon, which was responsible for creating the Numeron Code. Kite also reveals that the winner of the duel between the two Galaxy-Eyes users would break the spell, and obtain the key to use the Numeron Code itself. Then, Kite and Mizar commence their duel.
134	11	"Dragon Strife, Part 1" / "The Legend of the Revived Dragon Emperor!! Galaxy-Eyes Prime Photon Dragon"; Transliteration: "Yomigaeru Ryūkō Shinwa!! Gyarakushīaizu Puraimu Foton Doragon" (Japanese: 甦る竜皇神話！！ 銀河眼の光子竜皇)	Shin Yoshida	December 22, 2013	December 1, 2014 (Hulu)
Kite and Mizar immediately bring out Neo Galaxy-Eyes Photon Dragon and Neo Galaxy-Eyes Tachyon Dragon respectively. As Kite struggles with his vision following his previous encounter with Mr. Heartland, Orbital 7 uses his power to help him focus. Drawing power from the tablets surrounding him, Kite manages to bring out Galaxy-Eyes Photon Dragon's true form, Number 62: Galaxy-Eyes Prime Photon Dragon, and destroys Neo Galaxy-Eyes Tachyon Dragon. However, Mizar activates Tachyon Chaos Hole, which banishes itself from play, along with Kite's set card. As Mizar brings back Neo Tachyon Dragon and attacks on his next turn, Kite manages to bring out Number 46: Dragulon to block its attack and destroy both dragons, resulting in Mizar recovering his memories. Refusing to believe that Tachyon Dragon was the embodiment of Don Thousand's curse on him, or that it would betray him, Mizar brings back Neo Galaxy-Eyes Tachyon Dragon using Galaxy Rebirth, which halves its attack points. Then, Mizar launches a direct attack at Kite, determined that he would defeat Kite.
135	12	"Dragon Strife, Part 2" / "The Future Is in This Hand! The Climax of the Galaxy Showdown!!"; Transliteration: "Mirai wo Kono Te ni! Gyarakushī Kessen Shūketsu!!" (Japanese: 未来をこの手に！ 銀河決戦終結！！)	Shin Yoshida	December 29, 2013	December 6, 2014 (Hulu)
Orbital 7 generates an energy shield to protect Kite, using his Baria Crystal. However, the attack from Neo Galaxy-Eyes Tachyon Dragon eventually breaks through, injuring both Kite and Orbital 7, and also damaging Kite's faceplate. After taking a large amount of damage from Mizar's attack, Kite and Orbital combine their strength to draw a monster to help them survive Mizar's next turn, but leaving them with critical damage. Yuma and the others try to convince Mizar to stop fighting for Don Thousand. When Mizar replies that he was fighting to protect his fellow Barians, Yuma and his friends inform him of the other Barian Emperors' defeats and absorption by Vector. He also tells Mizar that Neo Galaxy-Eyes Tachyon Dragon was the embodiment of Don Thousand's curse on him, much to Mizar's horror and disbelief. However Kite remains determined to finish the fight, and claims that he would free Mizar from his curse. When Mizar learns that he can no longer fight for his fellow Barians because they had been absorbed by Vector, Mizar becomes horrified. Despite this, Mizar refuses to back down and uses Tachyon Downfall Cannon to halve Neo Galaxy-Eyes Tachyon Dragon's attack points repeatedly, to launch multiple attacks at Kite. However, Kite uses the effects of the monster he set, Galaxy Mirror Sage, to survive the onslaught before it is destroyed, reducing Kite's life points to 100. Galaxy-Eyes Prime Photon Dragon then reappears due to its effect, and its attack points double, due to that effect having activated when Prime Photon Dragon was banished. Kite acknowledges Mizar as the true Galaxy-Eyes Master, before defeating him with Prime Photon Dragon. After the duel, the cards of Galaxy-Eyes Tachyon Dragon, Dragulon, and Galaxy-Eyes Prime Photon Dragon combine their power to revive the hundredth Original Number card, Number 100: Numeron Dragon, the very creator of those dragons and the Numeron Code itself, which transforms into a card in Kite's possession. Kite gives the card to Mizar before dying due to his injuries and the lack of oxygen in space, due to Orbital 7's system failure. As a result, Mizar mourns Kite's death, while vowing revenge on Don Thousand. Meanwhile, Vector raises the ruins of a colosseum for his upcoming duel, stating that this would be the location of both his final brawl with Nash, and his graveyard. Meanwhile, Nash heads back to Barian World in order to confront Vector, screaming at Vector and Don Thousand to wait for him.
136	13	"The Forsaken Palace" / "Sinister Memories! Nash VS Vector, the Devil!! Transliteration: "Kyōki no Kioku! Nasshu VS Majin Bekutā!!" (Japanese: 凶気の記憶！ ナッシュVS魔人ベクター！！)	Mitsutaka Hirota	January 12, 2014	December 14, 2014 (Hulu)
In Vector's sleep, he flashes back to his past life, where he is being chased down a corridor by angry ghosts. A ghost grabs Vector's leg, causing him to trip. As the ghosts close in, Vector insists that he wasn't the one who killed them, before screaming in terror. Then, Vector wakes with a startle, but when Don Thousand asks him if something was wrong, Vector insists that he was fine. Before Nash arrives, Don Thousand has a brief talk with Vector, saying that he could sense Nash's overwhelming anger, and that this duel would be the finale. However, Vector entangles Don Thousand in energy tentacles, and smirks, saying that this wasn't Don Thousand's time, and that he would be the one to finish off Nash. Then, Don Thousand screams as Vector seals him away within himself. Nash soon arrives, and fires a bolt of lightning at Vector, only for him to teleport and dodge the attack. Then, the two of them commence their duel, and Vector activates Don Thousand's contract, which removes 2000 of Nash's life points in order to activate, and allows both of them to draw 1 card each. It also forces players to reveal all cards that they draw, and prevents players from Normal Summoning if they draw a spell card. Nash brings out Silent Honor DARK with Rank-Up-Magic The Seventh One and deals some damage, but Vector fully aware of Dark along with Nash's strategies uses that damage to summon Chaos Number 65: King Overfiend, with the trap card Chaos Rising. He then uses a spell card, Chaos Mad Feast, to send Don Thousand's Contract to the Graveyard to Special Summon Chaos Number 104: Umbral Horror Masquerade, along with Dumon's Archfiend Seraph and Marin's Ragnafinity. As Yuma's group arrives on the scene, Vector fully absorbs the souls of the Barian Emperors that he had defeated, causing him to transform to a form similar to Don Thousand. Vector then attacks Nash with all 3 of his Chaos Over-Hundred Numbers and King Overfiend, reducing Nash's life points to 100. However, Nash manages to take control of King Overfiend, power it up, and destroy Umbral Horror Masquerade, which drops Vector's life points to 1000. This causes Vector to revert to his human form and witness his true memories.
137	14	"Clash of the Emperors" / "Vector's Trifling! Bonds of Trapped Friendship!!"; Transliteration: "Bekutā no Honrō! Torawareta Nakama no Kizuna!!" (Japanese: ベクターの翻弄！ 捕われた仲間の絆！！)	Mitsutaka Hirota	January 19, 2014	December 21, 2014 (Hulu)
In Vector's memories, it is revealed he was the kind prince of a kingdom, who lost both his parents due to Don Thousand's manipulation and became corrupted by his evil. Realizing his folly, Vector transfers control of all his Xyz Monsters to Nash, asking him to stop him. When Vector reveals his intent to kill Don Thousand, Don Thousand tries to absorb Vector, only to be stopped by Vector's energy shield. However, just as Nash attacks, Vector reveals he was just putting on an act and activates another trap to destroy all of his monsters. Then, Vector Barian Battlemorphs back to his new Barian form, and engulfs Don Thousand in energy flames, seemingly destroying Don Thousand. Vector then uses Rank-Up-Magic Admiration of the Thousands to revive all 3 of his Over-Hundred Numbers, steal Nash's DARK, and overlay them to Xyz Summon his ultimate monster, Chaos Number 5: Chaos Chimera Dragon. However, Nash manages to summon Abyss Splash and evolve it into Chaos Number 73: Abyss Supra Splash, using Rank-Up-Magic Quick Chaos. Then, Nash destroys Chaos Chimera Dragon and wins the duel, which causes Vector to revert to his human form, muttering that his loss to Nash was impossible.
138	15	"The New World" / "A Being of Chaos - "Don Thousand" Emerges!!"; Transliteration: "Kaosu-taru Mono "Don Sauzando" Kōrai!!" (Japanese: 混沌たる存在 『ドン・サウザンド』光来！！)	Mitsutaka Hirota, Shin Yoshida	January 26, 2014	December 28, 2014 (Hulu)
Vector is shocked that Nash was able to beat him, while Nash taunts him, saying that it was just like their second duel in their past lives. Nash reveals that after Vector had escaped upon losing their first duel, Nash had pursued him to Vector's kingdom, and found all of its inhabitants dead. He had challenged Vector to another duel and defeated him, and upon losing, Vector was overwhelmed by the ghosts of those he had murdered, pulling him down to Hell. Then, in the present, Vector is attacked by the ghosts of those he had killed, frightening him and causing him to scream, with Nash remarking that no matter the place or time, the wicked who revel in their own power will end up destroying themselves. Vector yells that it won't be the same this time, and he throws up an energy shield to repel their attack, driving them off. Refusing to accept defeat, Vector tries to unleash his full power in an attempt to destroy everything. At the same time, the ruins rise higher into the sky, and Vector claims that he's become more powerful than the Seven Barian Emperors, and even Don Thousand. Vector continues to power up, until Don Thousand reemerges from below, towering above the ruins, which shocks Vector. Don Thousand calls Vector a fool for thinking that he could kill him, and says that his power doesn't belong to Vector. Don Thousand tells Vector that he was merely waiting for the right opportunity, and now Vector has outlived his usefulness. Then, the eye on Don Thousand's abdomen glows and begins sucking Vector towards him, with Nash barely escaping the force of its pull. Vector screams and tries to scramble away, but the force of suction is too powerful and Vector loses his grip on the cobblestones. However Yuma comes to save Vector, shocking him and the others, but then Vector cackles and tries to drag Yuma with him. But Yuma's words allow Vector to finally understand the sincerity of his kindness, causing him to flash back to the times he spent with Yuma as "Ray Shadows," even while Don Thousand's influence over him is broken. Having reverted to his original, kind personality, Vector tells Yuma that he is an idiot, and that he cannot drag Yuma with him. Then, Vector decides to let go, allowing Don Thousand to absorb him in order to save Yuma, causing Yuma to scream "Ray!" Then, Yuma weeps over the death of Vector, and he tries to attack Don Thousand, only to be repelled by Don Thousand's energy wave. As the merging of the Barian and Human Worlds finishes, Don Thousand begins to shed his Barian form, and he is engulfed by a Barian flower on a gigantic Barian tree that sprouts up nearby. Barian World is transformed dramatically before Yuma's and Nash's eyes, with new Barian plants sprouting up, and the power of chaos surging through new channels that appear, originating from the location of Don Thousand's transformation. Then, the flower opens and unveil's an energy version of Don Thousand's original form. Don Thousand then reveals that he has fully merged the Human World with Barian World. Twisted parts of Heartland City begin to appear in the background, shocking Yuma and his friends. Just then, Mizar arrives and gives "Number 100: Numeron Dragon" to Yuma, before challenging Don Thousand himself to a duel, saying that he would be the one to destroy him. When the duel between Mizar and Don Thousand starts, Don Thousand ends his turn without making any actions, and when Mizar tries to kill both of them using Dragon King's Demise, Don Thousand changes Mizar's card into Card of the Dragon King using the counter trap, Numeron Spell Revision, which causes Mizar's plan to backfire and wipes out all of Mizar's Life Points. As Mizar lies dying, he urges Nash and Yuma not to let everyone else's sacrifice be in vain, before his body dissolves and his soul is absorbed by Don Thousand. Don Thousand levitates off the ground, telling Nash that it was time for Nash to return to him as well. Then, Don Thousand re-transforms. This time into his true form, with the illuminated parts of his body solidifying into a dark color scheme similar to Number 96's, his grey hair turning into a luminescent yellow, and his eyes solidifying into blue and red. A third eye also appears on his forehead, similar to the eye on the abdomen of Number 96's Chaos form. Don Thousand tells Nash and Yuma that they will not escape, and that they are simply worms who will become his feast. Don Thousand then takes on simultaneously Yuma and Nash, again ending his first turn without any actions. Yuma summons Utopia, but Thousand destroys it and replaces it with Ganbara Knight, with its effects negated (with the counter trap, Numeron Xyz Revision), revealing that he has used a mysterious field spell, Numeron Network, which allows Don Thousand to activate his "Numeron" cards from his Deck. This was the same card that Don Thousand had used to change Mizar's card. This leads them to realize that Don Thousand possesses the power of the Numeron Code, which is drawing its power from the worlds connected to Barian World, with Astral World next on the list. Then, Don Thousand reveals his true plan: since he did not know where the Numeron Code was, other than the fact that it was on Earth, he fused the Barian World and Earth together to control the Numeron Code, much to Astral's shock and dismay. It is also revealed that once Don Thousand obtains the Numeron Code, he plans to use it to reshape all the worlds to his image. Then, Don Thousand opens a portal to Astral World, and reveals that each time Nash or Yuma takes damage, he will be able to attack Astral World directly.
139	16	"The Source Code" / "Cut Open a Path to the Future: Astral's Determination!!"; Transliteration: "Kirihiraku Mirai Asutoraru no Ketsudan!!" (Japanese: 切り開け未来 アストラルの決断!!)	Mitsutaka Hirota	February 2, 2014	January 4, 2015 (Hulu)
Don Thousand uses Numeron Direct to summon Numbers 1 through 4: Numeron Gate Ekam, Dve, Trini, and Catvari, which destroys the gigantic Barian tree in the process. Believing that destroying the Numeron Network is the key to winning, and surmising that the actual card was embedded deep within the Chaos channels, Astral decides to dive into the Numeron Network himself. Don Thousand calls them fools, saying that even if they managed to destroy Numeron Network, they cannot win. Then, Don Thousand combines the 4 Numbers into a gigantic gate, from which emerges a dragon, the true form of the 4 "Numeron Gate" Numbers. Then, Don Thousand attacks Nash and Yuma with Numbers 1-4, with all of their attack points doubling each time one of them makes a successful attack. Yuma and Nash barely manage to survive Don Thousand's attacks, by utilizing their trap cards. However, their life points are depleted to 500, and Don Thousand uses the damage they took to attack Astral World. The attack points of Numbers 1-4 also increase to 16,000 through their effects. Then, Don Thousand evolves Ekam into Chaos Number 1: Numeron Chaos Gate Sunya, which banishes all of Don Thousand's monsters, including itself. This threatens to eliminate Yuma and Shark on Don Thousand's next turn, because Sunya's effect will allow it to return on Don Thousand's next Standby Phase, and inflict damage equal to the total attack points of all the monsters Banished by Sunya's effect - 50,000. Nash takes advantage of Numeron Network's weakness (being that it could only be used once each turn) by causing Don Thousand to waste Numeron Spell Revision on a decoy spell that Nash activates, before he uses Rank-Up-Magic The Seventh One to bring out Silent Honor DARK, and using its ability to summon Silent Honor ARK. Meanwhile, Don Thousand attacks Astral with dark energy tentacles within the Numeron Network, attempting to ensnare him, but Astral's determination allows him to break free. Then, Nash attacks Don Thousand with both ARK and DARK. However, after his life points are reduced to 1,900, Don Thousand prevents DARK's attack from finishing him off by summoning Numeron Wall. Nash then uses DARK's ability to turn Numeron Wall into one of its Overlay Units. Then, Astral reaches the location of the Numeron Network card, a red-black energy sphere at the very heart of the Chaos channels, and Don Thousand informs Astral in that in order to destroy it, he would have to sacrifice the Human World, because the backlash of energy resulting from the card's destruction would destroy the Human World. Rejecting both of these ideas, Astral puts himself at risk by destroying the card, which bringing the card to the surface and allows Numeron Network to be destroyed. Nash uses Depth Eruption to destroy all cards on the field, including Numeron Network. Astral prepares to sacrifice himself to protect Yuma's world from the energy that would be released by Numeron Network's destruction, but Eliphas appears, forces Astral out of the energy sphere and tells him that he cannot let Astral die yet. Then, he sacrifices himself in Astral's place, leaving him with a card. Then, Nash activates Silent Honor DARK's ability to revive it from the Graveyard, raising Nash and Yuma's Life Points to 3,300.
140	17	"A Thousand Ways To Lose" / "Our Feelings Are As One! The Dragon of Creation, "Numeron Dragon"; Transliteration: "Omoi wa Hitotsu ni! Souzouryuu "Numeron Doragon"" (Japanese: 想いはひとつに！ 創造龍 ヌメロン・ドラゴン)	Mitsutaka Hirota	February 9, 2014	January 11, 2015 (Hulu)
Chaos Number 1: Numeron Chaos Gate Shunya returns, but because Numeron Network in no longer on the field, it self-destructs, sparing Nash and Yuma the 50,000 points of damage that would have finished them. Don Thousand calls them fools and says that this is a "Duel of the gods" - all roads here will lead mortals to despair. Then, Don Thousand activates Numeron Chaos Ritual, which lets him overlay Numeron Network and his four Numeron Gate Numbers to Xyz Summon his ultimate monster, Chaos Number 1000: Numerronius the Divine Giant, inflicting more damage to Yuma, Nash, and Astral World, and taking control of Silent Honor DARK. Yuma and Astral combine into ZEXAL to summon Utopia, but Don Thousand uses the effect of Numerronius to destroy it and replace it with Utopia Ray Victory. Don Thousand reveals that Numerronius the Divine Giant negates the effects of their Chaos monsters, and that it also prevents those monsters from attacking. Then, Yuma and Astral fuse into ZEXAL II to summon Zexal Server - Ouroburos Sage, which unites the powers of Utopia Ray Victory and ARK, allowing them to reduce Don Thousand's life points to 900. However, Don Thousand sends DARK to the Graveyard to prevent Numerronius from being destroyed, before using its ability to take control of Yuma and Nash's monsters. Yuma is shocked that ZEXAL has failed them, and he cancels the fusion. Don Thousand tells them that humans cannot fight against the power of Chaos, because they are the power of Chaos, and he adds that the power of Chaos will always revive him. Don Thousand reveals that at the end of his battle with Astral, the shock of the battle had fragmented Astral's power into 50 of the original Number cards (including the 4 Numeron Gate Numbers), which detailed the location of the Numeron Code and scattered across the world, seven of which sealed away Don Thousand's power. When Yuma had met Astral for the first time, his remaining power was divided into 50 more Number cards, which had scattered across the Earth as well, containing Astral's memories. Don Thousand reveals that immediately after the battle, the 7 Mythyrian Numbers chose their own owners, and attached themselves to the souls of heroes and sages of the Earth (the Seven Barian Emperors). Don Thousand explains that he had cursed those humans by giving them the power of Chaos, so that they would become his fuel for rebirth. Don Thousand claims that humanity is weak, and because of that weakness, Chaos can consume them easily, and that no one was immune. Don Thousand shows them that he had brainwashed the 3 knights who had killed Dumon into murdering their comrade, and that he had influenced Marin into sacrificing herself during Vector's attack on their homeland. Nash curses him, but Don Thousand reminds him that Nash himself is guided by his curse, and that he'll soon realize why he was reborn as a Barian. Nash is infuriated, but Yuma says that despite the weakness of humans, they can use the power of Chaos in other ways, to help and protect others, and he adds that there's no way they will lose the duel. Don Thousand is surprised that they are still clinging to such a dim hope, and he uses Numeron Storm to destroy all of their spell and trap cards, and reduce their life points to 100. Just as Don Thousand prepares to destroy them using Numerronius, Kite's spirit returns and chides Yuma, asking if he intended to give up. This shocks Yuma and Don Thousand, but Kite goes on to ask what had happened to Yuma's persistent spirit, and he tells Yuma that he is an idiot. Kite tells Yuma that he has entrusted everything to Yuma, so they can't lose the duel. Then, the card text of Number 100 clears, and Yuma realizes that it was the card that Kite had left for him, and he declares that they can continue. Yuma uses the effect of Number 100: Numeron Dragon to Special Summon it, since he had no cards on the field and was being attacked directly. Don Thousand calls this absurd, saying that filthy maggots like them shouldn't have been able to awaken the Numeron Dragon. However, Don Thousand states that it doesn't matter, and he orders Numerronius to continue its attack. Yuma uses Numeron Dragon's effect to reduce Numerronius' attack points to 0 and destroy both of them. Then, since Numeron Dragon was removed from the field, all of Don Thousand's cards are destroyed, and all of Yuma and Nash's spell and trap cards return to the field. However, Don Thousand calls them fools, stating that no matter what they do, they simply open another door to despair. Because Numerronius was destroyed, this allows Don Thousand to summon his true ace monster, the Rank 13 Chaos Imaginary Number 1000: Numerronius Numerronia, which has an attack power of 100,000. Although Numerronius Numerronia can't attack, it will force Yuma's and Nash's monsters to attack it, and if they don't, Don Thousand will automatically win the duel during Nash's End Phase. After Yuma fuses with Astral into ZEXAL III, Nash brings out Abyss Splash, while Yuma uses Utopia Rising to revive Utopia. Then, Nash uses Yuma's trap, Bonds of Hope, to revive Numeron Dragon, and give their abilities and all of Abyss' overlay units to Utopia to represent their united bonds. Yuma tells Don Thousand that this time, he will really feel the force of all of their hopes and dreams.
141	18	"The Fate of Three Worlds" / "The End of Chaos: The Deadly Final Hope Sword Slash"; Transliteration: "Konoton Shūen: Hissatsu no Fainaru Hōpu Ken Surasshu!!" (Japanese: 混沌終焉 必殺のファイナル・ホープ剣・スラッシュ!!)	Shin Yoshida	February 16, 2014	January 18, 2015 (Hulu)
Yuma attacks Numerronius Numerronia with Utopia, after using both Abyss' and Numeron Dragon's abilities to boost Utopia's attack points to 102,000 points. However, Don Thousand uses Numerronius Numerronia's ability to negate the attack and boost his life points to 102,900. But then, Yuma uses Double or Nothing to double Utopia's attack points to 204,000 points, which also allows it to attack again, finally destroying Numerronius Numerronia and defeating Don Thousand. Kite's spirit disappears as Yuma thanks him for his help. The portal to Astral World closes, and the fusion between Barian World and the Human World appears to be undone. However, Don Thousand gloats that they had destroyed only his body and that the fight wasn't over yet. With his final breath, Don Thousand transfers his soul into Nash, along with the souls of the other Barian Emperors, and all of his Number cards, which are infused with Don Thousand's malignant essence. Nash becomes covered in an evil aura, and he forces Yuma and Astral out of the ZEXAL III fusion, and sends all of them to an arena between Astral World and Barian World. It is then revealed that Human World and Barian World are still fused together, and that both worlds were beginning to merge with Astral World. Additionally, the suns of all 3 worlds appear in the sky above them. Nash explains that Barian World and Astral World were about to collide, and that Astral World in its current state was too weak to survive such a collision. It turns out that Nash had used Don Thousand's power to force the 3 worlds into a collision. However, Nash states that he cannot allow the loss of Barian World. Nash claims that out of all the Seven Barian Emperors, he was the only one who chose to be a Barian of his own will, because all of his friends in his past life were sent to Barian World. Nash tells Yuma that his very existence was the curse of Don Thousand, and that since he willingly became a Barian, that curse can't be undone. Also, he refutes Yuma's claims that a coexistence between the two worlds was possible, with Astral agreeing that if both worlds were to reunite, Astral World would perish in its current state. Then, Nash challenges Yuma and Astral to a duel, with all 3 worlds and the Numeron Code on the line. As the duel progresses, Nash summons 4 of the Chaos Over-Hundred Numbers onto his side of the field: Silent Honor DARK, Archfiend Seraph, Ragnafinity, and Neo Galaxy-Eyes Tachyon Dragon, while Special Summoning the other 3 to Yuma's side of the field: Battlin' Boxer Comet Cestus, Umbral Horror Masquerade, and Giant Red Hand.
142	19	"The Battle of Three Worlds" / "Final Hope!! We are "Beyond"; Transliteration: "Saigo no Kibō!! Ware wa "Biyondo"" (Japanese: 最後の希望！！ 我は「ビヨンド」)	Shin Yoshida	February 23, 2014	January 25, 2015 (Hulu)
Nash overlays all of the Chaos Over-Hundred Numbers to summon Chaos Xyz Barian Hope, which is able to use each of their special abilities. Nash pays his life points until they drop to 1,100, in order to use the Chaos Over-Hundred Numbers' effects without detaching Overlay Units. Nash then attacks repetitively, destroying Utopia and reducing Yuma's life points to 1,200. After managing to survive Barian Hope's attack, Yuma comes to understand that Nash, refusing to use his Overlay Units, desires to fight alongside the souls of his friends. As Yuma and Astral enter ZEXAL III, Yuma discovers that the power coming from their duel is accelerating the fusion of the three worlds. As Hart encourages the people in Heartland City to support Yuma, Vetrix gets into contact with Kazuma, and the two of them use their power to hold back the worlds for as long as they can. Yuma uses the card he received from Eliphas, Rank-Up-Magic Astral Force, to evolve Utopia into Number 39: Utopia Beyond. Then, Yuma raises its attack points to 8,000 using a trap, and lowers Barian Hope's attack points to 0, using Utopia Beyond's ability. Yuma manages to destroy Barian Hope using Utopia Beyond; however, Barian Hope's destruction causes Nash to scream with rage at both Yuma and Astral.
143	20	"The Future of Three Worlds" / "The Aloof Duelist "Nash": The Destined Final Duel"; Transliteration: "Kokō no Dyueristo Nasshu Shukumei no Rasuto Dyueru!!" (Japanese: 孤高の決闘者『ナッシュ』 宿命のラストバトル!!)	Shin Yoshida	March 2, 2014	February 1, 2015 (Hulu)
Just when it seems that Yuma destroyed Barian Hope, Nash activates a trap card, Reincarnation of the Seven Emperors, to Banish Barian Hope and all of its Overlay Units instead, to reduce the Battle Damage he would take to 0. Then, Nash uses the other effect of Reincarnation of the Seven Emperors to Special Summon Black Ray Lancer, and inflict its attack points as damage to Yuma. However, Yuma uses the effects of Utopia Beyond to Banish it and Special Summon Number 39: Utopia, in its place, and then gain life points equal to half of Utopia's attack points. This allows Yuma to survive with only 350 life points. The force of the damage sends Yuma and Astral out of ZEXAL III and Nash reverts to his human form due to his exhaustion. When Yuma attacks Black Ray Lancer with Utopia, Nash uses Friller Shark's effects to negate the attack and remove 500 attack points from Utopia. Nash tells Yuma that although he considers him to be his friend, he is now a Barian, and he must do whatever he must to protect the souls of his other friends, the Barians. Yuma recalls that when he allowed Astral to come to Earth, the Door told him that he must give up what he held dearest, now realizing that the Door had meant that he had to give up his friends. Resolving to defeat Yuma and Astral, and to obtain the Numeron Code, Nash Barian Battlemorphs back into his Barian form. Nash summons Submersible Carrier Aero Shark, and attempts to finish Yuma with its effects, but Yuma uses the trap Damage Take-Over to reduce Utopia's attack points to 1600 in order to reduce the damage he would have taken to 0, and then it becomes an Overlay Unit for Utopia. Then, Nash attacks Yuma with both Black Ray Lancer and Submersible Carrier Aero Shark, but Yuma uses Utopia's ability to negate Black Ray Lancer's attack, which results in Aero Shark reducing his life points to 50. Remembering their fallen comrades, Yuma and Astral merge into ZEXAL III again, allowing Yuma to summon Zexal Weapon - Sylphid Wing, which he equips onto Utopia to raise its attack points to 2400. Yuma attacks Aero Shark, but Nash activates Rebirth of the Seven Emperors to tribute his Xyz Monsters, in order to Special Summon Chaos Xyz Barian Hope, and attach Silent Honor DARK, Archfiend Seraph, and Ragnafinity to Barian Hope as Overlay Units. This gives Barian Hope 3000 attack points. Also, during the End Phase, Rebirth of the Seven Emperors will inflict 300 points of damage to each player for every card in their respective hands. Yuma then uses Sylphid Wing's effect to increase Utopia's attack points to 4000, since Nash summoned an Xyz Monster, but Nash counters this by activating the trap Draw of Fate, which negates the attack and forces both players to draw 1 card. However, during the End Phase, if any player didn't use the drawn card, that player would automatically lose the Duel. Yuma and Astral perform a Shining Draw while Nash performs a Chaos Draw. When Yuma sees the card he drew, he hesitates to use it because he doesn't want to kill his friend, Nash, but he also knows that if he doesn't use that card, he will lose the Duel. However, Astral reminds him that outcome of this duel hangs on the balance of that draw. Yuma activates Double or Nothing to raise Utopia's attack points to 8000, and to allow it to attack again. However, Yuma can't bring himself to finish Nash, and as a result, he cancels the ZEXAL III fusion with Astral. Then, Yuma uses Sylphid Wing's effect to turn it into an Overlay Unit for Utopia, which he then uses to negate his own attack. Yuma's words reach Nash, and Nash finally accepts Yuma as his friend. But then, Nash activates the spell Glory of the Seven Emperors, which attaches the rest of the Banished Chaos Over-Hundred Numbers to Barian Hope as Overlay Units, raising its attack points to 7,000. However, Glory of the Seven Emperors prevents Barian Hope from being destroyed that turn, and it also makes Yuma take any Battle Damage that Nash would take that turn. But during the End Phase, Glory of the Seven Emperors will make Nash's life points become equal to the change in Yuma's life points during that turn. Since neither player has any cards in their hands, Rebirth of the Seven Emperors inflicts no damage to either of them. Then, during the End Phase, Glory of the Seven Emperors' final effect activates, but since Yuma's life points didn't change that turn, Shark's own life points become 0, resulting in his own defeat. Chaos Xyz Barian Hope vanishes, and the ensuing explosion knocks him backwards, causing him to revert to his human form, even as Yuma screams, "Shark!" This also destroys Don Thousand's essence in the process, ending Don Thousand's curse for good. When Astral asks if Shark was planning this the whole time, he responds by saying that he was serious the whole time, but Yuma and Astral infected him with their words, and now he has no regrets. He also tells them that they were too good-hearted to follow through with their attack. Shark tells Yuma that most people throw away the most important thing as they grow up, and he urges Yuma not to do that, to keep believing in others and to keep his pure heart and soul that never gives up. Shark says that he wants to see the future that they will create, but he doesn't think he'll be able to. Shark's body glows, and Astral is able to absorb all of his Numbers, allowing him to obtain all 100 of the Original Numbers. Shark begins to fade, and calls Yuma and Astral his best friends. He also says that this was the greatest duel he ever had, and the one he had enjoyed the most, until the final moment. Shark then bids them farewell before fading completely into the light, causing Yuma to scream, "Shark!" Then, light breaks through the pink Barian clouds and seagulls fly around, and Yuma, Astral, and Tori find themselves back at the docks of Heartland City. The arena between worlds fades into the distance, even as Yuma screams in anguish.
144	21	"Last First Duel" / "The Ceremonial Battle!! Yuma VS Astral"; Transliteration: "Tatakai no Gi!! Yūma VS Asutoraru" (Japanese: 闘いの儀!! 遊馬VSアストラル)	Shin Yoshida	March 9, 2014	February 8, 2015 (Hulu)
Astral World and Barian World avoid the collision and begin to separate, and Kazuma parts ways with Vetrix. While Yuma is saddened by Shark's death, he is pleased to find that Flip, along with all the others who sent to Barian World, have returned safely as a result of Nash's and Don Thousand's defeat (with the exception of Kite). Then, the fusion between Barian World and the Human World is undone, allowing both worlds to finally separate. Yuma's happiness is short-lived, however, because Astral reveals that since he has gathered enough Numbers to obtain the Numeron Code, he intends to carry out his mission to destroy Barian World. Refusing to let him do such a thing, Yuma challenges Astral to a duel to decide who will possess the Numeron Code, with Astral stating that he will destroy Barian World and remove Yuma's memories of him should he win. Later that day, Yuma's friends come by to help him construct a deck to face against Astral's Numbers, but Yuma decides he wants to duel him with his own strength. Before the duel, Yuma informs Tori about the true stakes of the duel, asking her to keep quiet about it so as to not cause any worry. The duel soon begins, with Astral quickly assembling Utopia, Utopia Ray, Utopia Ray V, Utopia Ray Victory, and Utopia Beyond, and boosting his life points to 5,250. However, Astral attacks Yuma with each of his Utopia monsters, with Utopia Ray V eventually getting through and depleting Yuma's life points to 1,400.
145	22	"Outclassed And Outmatched" / "My Name is Astral" – The Ultimate Duelist"; Transliteration: "Waga Na wa Asutoraru Saikyō no Dyuerisuto" (Japanese: 『わが名はアストラル』 最強の決闘者!!)	Shin Yoshida	March 16, 2014	February 15, 2015 (Hulu)
Yuma summons Gagaga Cowboy and Gagaga Samurai, and then he uses their abilities to boost their attack points to destroy Utopia Ray, Utopia Ray V, Utopia Beyond, and Utopia Ray Victory, which reduces Astral's life points to 1,050. Astral counterattacks by destroying Gagaga Cowboy with Number 39: Utopia, using Absolute Buster to prevent Yuma's Half Unbreak from negating Gagaga Cowboy's destruction. Yuma and Astral reflect on the time they had spent together as friends, and Yuma asks Astral why he wants to destroy Barian World in order to "rank-up" Astral World. Yuma insists that there is another way, but Astral remains determined in his decision to use the Numeron Code to destroy Barian World. Yuma uses Gagagarevenge to revive Gagaga Cowboy and attacks Utopia, but Astral senses that Yuma has a combo planned with his set cards, uses Utopia's ability to negate the attack. Yuma activates Light Wing Bumper, which reduces Utopia's attack points to 800 since his attack was negated, and Yuma destroys Utopia with Gagaga Samurai, lowering Astral's life points to 850. However, Astral activates Rank-Down-Magic Utopia Fall, which allows him to revive Utopia and use it as an Overlay Unit to Special Summon Number 39: Utopia Roots. Astral then equips Utopia Roots with Number Fortification, which raises Utopia Roots attack points to 2000, and allows Astral to attach 2 Number monsters from his Extra Deck to Utopia Roots as Overlay Units: Number 32: Shark Drake and Number 62: Galaxy-Eyes Prime Photon Dragon (Shark's original number and Kite's number, respectively). Astral attacks Gagaga Cowboy with Utopia Roots, but Yuma uses Gagaga Samurai's ability to switch it into defense mode and intercept Utopia Root's attack. However, Astral activates Rank Revolution to negate the effects of monsters Yuma controls with higher Rank/Levels than Utopia Roots, which negates the activation of Gagaga Samurai's effects. The attack follows through and Gagaga Cowboy is destroyed. Then, Astral activates Overlay Accel, which allows him to detach an Overlay Unit from Utopia Roots to attack again. Astral detaches Number 32: Shark Drake, and attacks Gagaga Samurai, which causes Yuma's life points to fall to 300. After attacking, Astral urges Yuma to regain something crucial that he had lost in his recent duels.
146	23	"Forever ZEXAL" / "Our Bonds Are Forever... Let's All Feel The Flow!"; Transliteration: "Kizuna yo Towa ni... Kattobingu daze, Ore-tachi!" (Japanese: 絆よ永遠に... かっとビングだぜ、オレたち!!)	Shin Yoshida	March 23, 2014	February 22, 2015 (Hulu)
Following Astral's attack Yuma has a flashback on a past conversation he had with Astral, and realizes that Astral wanted him to be able to duel while having fun again. Remembering the promise he made to Astral to go full force with his duels, while enjoying it, Yuma manages to pull off a Shining Draw to not only protect himself from Astral's attack, but also manages to summon his own Number, Future Number 0: Utopic Future. After seeing Yuma create his own Number, Astral concludes that Yuma is the reincarnation of another part of himself that he had lost during his ancient battle with Don Thousand, specifically, the part of him that had allowed him to utilize the power of ZEXAL. Astral responds by using his own Cosmic Shining Draw to generate and draw Hyper-Rank-Up-Magic Ultimate Force, and evolve Utopia Roots into Number 99: Utopic Dragon, which Yuma eventually manages to destroy. Just as Yuma prepares to make a direct attack, Astral brings out Door of Destiny, reminiscent of The Door where they first met. Pushing through, Yuma destroys the Door of Destiny with Utopic Future and wins the duel. After saying their goodbyes, Astral returns to Astral World, using the Numeron Code to bring Nash and the other Barian Emperors back to life as humans, as well as reviving Kite, Orbital 7, Ponta, and Eliphas. Astral also uses the Numeron Code to bring Yuma's parents back home. Finally, Astral uses the power of the Numeron Code to merge Barian World with Astral World, finally reuniting the 2 worlds. Some time later, while sitting with Tori, Shark tells Yuma that Astral is about to fight the force of Chaos approaching Astral World, due to his decision not to destroy Barian World. Since Barian World has been reunited with Astral World, the power of Chaos has returned and gathered, which is threatening the very existence of Astral World. Yuma and all of his friends set off to Astral World to help him out, including Vetrix's family, the Seven Barian Emperors, Ponta, Kite, Orbital 7, and Tori. Along the way, Vector is shown to be on good terms with the other Barian Emperors, waving off a remark about his new demeanor, and Tori finally confesses to Yuma about her romantic feelings for him. Yuma's last words are "You don't have to feel scared or alone, Astral," Everyone joins in saying, "'Cause we're feeling the..." Yuma finishes by saying, "flow!"
