= List of Muhyo & Roji's Bureau of Supernatural Investigation chapters =

First volume of the series, published by Shueisha in Japan on May 2, 2005

The chapters of the Japanese manga series Muhyo & Roji's Bureau of Supernatural Investigation were written and illustrated by Yoshiyuki Nishi. The series ran in Shueisha's Weekly Shōnen Jump from 2004 to 2008. Shueisha collected and published the chapters in 18 tankōbon volumes. The plot focuses on a young genius Magical Law Executor, Toru Muhyo, and his assistant, Jiro Kusano, as they track and find ghosts, then send the spirits to heaven or hell depending on the account of their lives in his magical law book.

The series is licensed for an English–language release in North America by Viz Media, which released the first volume of the series in October 2007 under its "Shonen Jump" manga line.

== Volumes ==
No.	Original release date	Original ISBN	English release date	English ISBN
1	May 2, 2005	978-4-08-873827-7	October 2, 2007	978-1-4215-1376-8
1. "Rie & Taeko"; 2. "Old Mrs. Kiyomi"; 3. "Genius"; 4. "The Present"; 5. "Kenji, Destroyer of Signs"; Special One: Shot: "Muhyo & Roji's Bureau of Supernatural Investigation"
2	July 4, 2005	978-4-08-873833-8	December 4, 2007	978-1-4215-1377-5
6. "Unfading"; 7. "Nana's photos"; 8. "Daddy"; 9. "Roji's pen"; 10. "Presence"; 11. "Premonition"; 12. "Madness"; 13. "Pride"; 14. "Together"
3	October 4, 2005	978-4-08-873867-3	February 5, 2008	978-1-4215-1546-5
15. "Someone's There"; 16. "Lurker in the Grass"; 17. "The Ghost Writer"; 18. "Zansetsu Hirata"; 19. "The Night Butterfly"; 20. "Artificer Biko"; 21. "The Landing"; 22. "Into The Arcanum"; 23. "The Mad Planter"
4	December 2, 2005	978-4-08-874001-0	April 1, 2008	978-1-4215-1639-4
24. "Tremors"; 25. "Rio & Roji"; 26. "Sophie"; 27. "A Ray of Light"; 28. "Advanced Magic Law"; 29. "Sad Times Ahead"; 30. "Falling Mist"; 31. "Raspberries"; 32. "Determination"
5	March 3, 2006	978-4-08-874030-0	June 3, 2008	978-1-4215-1640-0
33. "All or Nothing"; 34. "Face: off"; 35. "The Promise"; 36. "Swallows in the wind"; 37. "Kokkuri"; 38. "Enter Goryo"; 39. "The Plan"; 40. "Akagawa Apartments"; 41. "Dolls"
6	June 2, 2006	978-4-08-874112-3	August 5, 2008	978-1-4215-1641-7
42. "Maneuver 108"; 43. "Her Voice"; 44. "Victory and Defeat"; 45. "Parting"; 46. "Meeting"; 47. "Making the Grade"; 48. "Awakening"; 49. "The Academy"; 50. "The Tests Begin"
7	August 4, 2006	978-4-08-874144-4	October 7, 2008	978-1-4215-1642-4
51. "Trials & Tribulations"; 52. "Contract Fight"; 53. "The Plan's End"; 54. "Ready to Fight"; 55. "Wings"; 56. "Trust"; 57. "Decision"; 58. "As I Am"; 59. "Stirrings"
8	October 4, 2006	978-4-08-874267-0	December 2, 2008	978-1-4215-1643-1
60. "Tomas"; 61. "Pretty Things"; 62. "Bonds"; 63. "Before the Storm"; 64. "The Perfect Collection"; 65. "Armor of Flies"; 66. "Absorption"; 67. "Something Complete"; 68. "Finders Keepers"
9	December 4, 2006	978-4-08-874292-2	February 3, 2009	978-1-4215-2423-8
69. "Rightful Place"; 70. "Found"; 71. "Heading Out"; 72. "Two Shadows"; 73. "Panza"; 74. "Puppeteer"; 75. "Haunted by the Past"; 76. "Spirit Distillation"; 77. "Pansies"
10	February 2, 2007	978-4-08-874319-6	April 1, 2009	978-1-4215-2424-5
78. "Fate"; 79. "Target"; 80. "Executor Busujima"; 81. "Contact"; 82. "Isabi"; 83. "King of the Mountain"; 84. "The Bells of Troy"; 85. "A New Rule"; Countdown to Death
11	April 4, 2007	978-4-08-874342-4	June 2, 2009	978-1-4215-2425-2
86. "Flesh and Blood"; 87. "Rescue Mission; 88. "Hope"; 89. "One Inch"; 90. "Of Mice and Men"; 91. "Just a Scrape"; 92. "The Contract's End"; 93. "The Root of Evil"; 94. "Courage"; Bonus Story
12	June 4, 2007	978-4-08-874367-7	August 4, 2009	978-1-4215-2426-9
95. "Homecoming"; 96. "A Little Trick"; 97. "Aroropathy"; 98. "Writ of Passage"; 99. "Ginji"; 100. "It's Here"; 101. "The Bell"; 102. "Armor"; 103. "Bobby"
13	August 3, 2007	978-4-08-874402-5	October 6, 2009	978-1-4215-2427-6
104. "The Bottom of the Sea"; 105. "Payback"; 106. "Superhero"; 107. "The Ring"; 108. "A New Book of Magic Law"; 109. "The Battle Begins"; 110. "What Goes Around"; 111. "Proof"; 112. "Ace in the Hole"
14	October 4, 2007	978-4-08-874425-4	December 1, 2009	978-1-4215-2428-3
113. "Umbrella"; 114. "Buhpu"; 115. "Risk"; 116. "Warning Bells"; 117. "Toys"; 118. "Back-Up Plan"; 119. "Negotiation"; 120. "The Solution"; 121. "Envoy Possession"
15	December 4, 2007	978-4-08-874446-9	February 2, 2010	978-1-4215-2837-3
122. "Teacher & Student"; 123. "The Knight"; 124. "What Might Have Been"; 125. "Lollipop"; 126. "The Curse"; 127. "Hades"; 128. "Falling Down"; 129. "Some Things Never Change"; 130. "The Long Nightmare"; 131. "Crime and Punishment"; 132. "The Report"
16	February 4, 2008	978-4-08-874477-3	April 6, 2010	978-1-4215-2838-0
133. "The Stray spirit"; 134. "Attachment"; 135. "Siblings"; 136. "The Chofu Abductions"; 137. "Swallowed"; 138. "A Helping Hand"; 139. "Memories"; 140. "What Cannot Be Seen"; 141. "Distant Thunder"
17	April 4, 2008	978-4-08-874498-8	June 1, 2010	978-1-4215-2839-7
142. "Mobilization"; 143. "The Visitor"; 144. "The Charm"; 145. "The Association Army"; 146. "The War Begins"; 147. "The Pentagram"; 148. "Evolution"; 149. "Solitude"; 150. "Adrift"
18	June 4, 2008	978-4-08-874526-8	August 3, 2010	978-1-4215-2840-3
151. "Friends"; 152. "Karma"; 153. "Disbanded"; 154. "Miracle"; 155. "Partners"; 156. "Muhyo and Roji"
