= List of Yu-Gi-Oh! Zexal episodes =

Yu-Gi-Oh! Zexal (遊☆戯☆王 Zexal (ゼアル), Yūgiō Zearu) is the third spin-off anime series in the Yu-Gi-Oh! franchise and the fourth anime series overall by Nihon Ad Systems and TV Tokyo. It was directed by Satoshi Kuwahara and produced by Studio Gallop. The series aired in Japan on TV Tokyo between April 11, 2011, and September 24, 2012. The second half of this series, dubbed Yu-Gi-Oh! Zexal II in Japan, aired from October 7, 2012, to March 23, 2014, in a different time slot from that of the original series. The story follows young duelist Yuma Tsukumo who partners up with an ethereal spirit named Astral, as they search for the 100 Number Duel Monsters cards, which will restore Astral's memories and power. Following the end of the first series, which ended in Season 3, Yuma and his friends now find themselves up against the evil forces of Barian World.

The English-language adaptation of the series premiered on The CW's Toonzai programming block in the United States on October 15, 2011, and aired through August 10, 2013. The English-language version of Zexal II, produced by Konami, began airing in North America on The CW's Vortexx programming block on August 17, 2013. The series would eventually move to Hulu on July 14, 2014, beginning with Episode 114. Since then, most of the episodes have aired on Mondays on Hulu. On December 14, 2014, the episodes on Hulu began to be uploaded on Sundays instead of Mondays, with the exception of December 6, 2014, which saw Episode 135 being uploaded on a Saturday, because the following Sunday was National Pearl Harbor Remembrance Day. The regular airing pattern was broken again when the series finale (Episode 146) aired on February 21, 2015, a Saturday, instead of on a Sunday.

Twelve pieces of theme music are used for the series, with half of them being split between the two series: six opening and six ending themes. For episodes 1–25, the opening theme is "Masterpiece" (マスターピース, Masutāpīsu) by mihimaru GT while the ending theme is "My Quest" (僕クエスト, Boku Kuesuto) by Golden Bomber. For episode 26–49, the opening theme is "BRAVING!" (ブレイビング!, Bureibingu!) by KANAN while the ending theme is "Freesia of Longing" (切望のフリージア, Setsubō no Furījia) by DaizyStripper. For episodes 50–73, the opening theme is "Soul Drive" (魂ドライブ, Tamashī Doraibu) by Color Bottle while the ending theme is "Wild Child" (ワイルドチャイルド, Wairudo Chairudo) by moumoon. For the 4Kids and Konami English dub versions, the opening theme is "Take a Chance" for all episodes. For episodes 74–98, the opening theme is "Unbreakable Heart" (折れないハート, Arenai Hāto) by Hideaki Takatori, while the ending theme is "Artist" (アーティスト, Ātisuto) by Vistlip. For episodes 99–123, the opening theme is "Dualism of Mirrors" (鏡のデュアルイズム, Kagami no Duaruizumu) by Petit Milady (Aoi Yuki and Ayana Taketatsu), while the ending theme is "Go Way Go Way" (ゴーウェイゴーウェイ, Gō Wei Gō Wei) by FoZZtone. For episodes 124–145, the opening theme is "Wonder Wings" (ワンダーウィングス, Wandā Wingusu) by Diamond☆Yukai, while the ending theme is *"Challenge the GAME" (チャレンジザゲーム, Charenji za Gēmu) by REDMAN. However, for Episode 146, the Season 3 Japanese opening theme was not used. For the Konami English dub version, the opening theme is "Halfway to Forever" for all episodes that air in the US.

== Series overview ==
Season	Episodes	Originally released	
Season	Episodes	First released	Last released
1	25	April 11, 2011	October 3, 2011
2	24	October 10, 2011	March 26, 2012
3	24	April 9, 2012	September 24, 2012
4	25	October 7, 2012	April 7, 2013
5	25	April 14, 2013	September 29, 2013
6	23	October 6, 2013	March 23, 2014

== Zexal episode list ==
=== Season 1: Number Hunter (2011) ===
No. overall	No. in season	English dub title / Japanese translated title	Written by	Original release date	American air date
1	1	"Go With the Flow: Part 1" / "I'm Feeling the Flow!"; Transliteration: "Kattobingu da ze, Ore!!" (Japanese: かっとビングだぜ、オレ!!)	Shin Yoshida	April 11, 2011	October 15, 2011
2	2	"Go With the Flow: Part 2" / "My Name is Astral"; Transliteration: "Waga na wa Asutoraru" (Japanese: わが名はアストラル!)	Shin Yoshida	April 18, 2011	October 22, 2011
3	3	"In the End: Part 1" / "To Summarize, It's a Case!"; Transliteration: "Todo no Tsumari Jiken desu!" (Japanese: トドのつまり事件です!)	Shin Yoshida	April 25, 2011	October 29, 2011
4	4	"In the End: Part 2" / "Countdown to a Comeback! Astral is the Secret Plan!?"; Transliteration: "Gyakuten no Kauntodaun! Hisaku wa Asutoraru!?" (Japanese: 逆転のカウントダウン! 秘策はアストラル!?)	Shin Yoshida	May 2, 2011	November 5, 2011
5	5	"Flipping Out: Part 1" / "The Duel's Flip Side!"; Transliteration: "Dueru no Ura wo Yomu Ura!" (Japanese: デュエルのウラを読むウラ!)	Yoshifumi Fukushima	May 9, 2011	November 12, 2011
6	6	"Flipping Out: Part 2" / "Traitorous Numbers!?"; Transliteration: "Uragiri no Nanbāzu!?" (Japanese: 裏切りのナンバーズ!?)	Yoshifumi Fukushima	May 16, 2011	November 19, 2011
7	7	"The Sparrow: Part 1" / "Lavish Justice! The Sparrow Arrives!!"; Transliteration: "Seigi no Ōbanfurumai! Esupā Robin Sanjou!!" (Japanese: 正義の大盤振る舞い! エスパー・ロビン参上!!)	Shin Yoshida	May 23, 2011	November 26, 2011
8	8	"The Sparrow: Part 2" / "The Sparrow is Forever"; Transliteration: "Sutā Robin yo Eien ni" (Japanese: スター・ロビンよ永遠に)	Shin Yoshida	May 30, 2011	December 3, 2011
9	9	"Feline Frenzy" / "Cathy's Surprising Cat Deck!?"; Transliteration: "Kyatto Odoroku Neko Dekki!?" (Japanese: キャットオドロく猫デッキ!?)	Yasuyuki Suzuki	June 6, 2011	February 4, 2012
10	10	"Shark Attack" / "Shark's Counterattack!"; Transliteration: "Gyakushū no Shāku!" (Japanese: 逆襲のシャーク!)	Shin Yoshida	June 13, 2011	February 11, 2012
11	11	"The Pack: Part 1" / "Yuma and Shark: The Injury-Filled Tag Duel"; Transliteration: "Yuma to Shāku Kizu-darake no Taggude~yueru" (Japanese: 遊馬とシャーク 傷だらけのタッグデュエル)	Yoshifumi Fukushima	June 20, 2011	February 18, 2012
12	12	"The Pack: Part 2" / "Combo of Hope! Armored Xyz Activates!"; Transliteration: "Kibō no Gattai! Āmādo Ekushīzu Hatsudō!" (Japanese: 希望の合体! アーマード・エクシーズ発動!)	Yoshifumi Fukushima	June 27, 2011	February 25, 2012
13	13	"The Number Hunter: Part 1" / "Hunter of Souls! The Number Hunter Appears!"; Transliteration: "Tamashii o Karu Mono! Nanbāzu Hantā Genru!" (Japanese: 魂を狩る者! ナンバーズ・ハンター現る!)	Shin Yoshida	July 4, 2011	March 3, 2012
14	14	"The Number Hunter: Part 2" / "Galaxy-Eyes Photon Dragon Descends!"; Transliteration: "Gyarakushī Aizu Foton Doragon Kōrin!" (Japanese: 『銀河眼の光子竜』降臨!)	Shin Yoshida	July 11, 2011	March 10, 2012
15	15	"Training Days: Part 1" / "Battle at the Duel Sanctuary, Legendary Monsters Resurrect!!"; Transliteration: "Shitō, Kettōan, Densetsu no Monsutā Fukkatsu!!" (Japanese: 死闘、決闘庵 伝説のモンスター復活!!)	Yasuyuki Suzuki	July 18, 2011	March 17, 2012
16	16	"Training Days: Part 2" / "The Deadliest Ninja Arts! The Most Terrifying Ninja!"; Transliteration: "Hissatsu Ninpō! Sai Osore Ninja Ara Waru!" (Japanese: 必殺忍法! 最恐忍者あらわる!)	Yasuyuki Suzuki	July 25, 2011	March 24, 2012
17	17	"It's in the Cards: Part 1" / "The All-Seeing Fortune–Teller: The Terrifying Fortuneteller - Fortuno"; Transliteration: "Subete o Mitōsu Mono Kyōfu no Uranaishi Jin" (Japanese: すべてを見通す者 恐怖の占い師・ジン)	Kenichi Yamashita	August 1, 2011	March 31, 2012
18	18	"It's in the Cards: Part 2" / "Chaos Xyz Evolution! The Light of Aspiration: Utopia Ray!!"; Transliteration: "Kaosu Ekushīzu Chenji! Kibō no Hikari Hōpu Rei!!" (Japanese: カオスエクシーズ・チェンジ! 希望の光ホープ・レイ!!)	Kenichi Yamashita	August 8, 2011	April 7, 2012
19	19	"The Edge of the World" / "The Promised High-Fiving the Sky"; Transliteration: "Yakusoku no Kattobingu" (Japanese: 約束のかっとビング)	Shin Yoshida	August 15, 2011	April 14, 2012
20	20	"Roots of the Problem" / "The Pitch-Black Number: Dark Yuma VS Bronk"; Transliteration: "Shikkoku no Nanbāzu Yami Yūma vs Tetsuo" (Japanese: 漆黒のナンバーズ 闇遊馬vs鉄男)	Yoshifumi Fukushima	August 22, 2011	April 21, 2012
21	21	"Battle with the Bot" / "Yuma VS The Litterbot, Lillybot"; Transliteration: "Yūma vs Osōji Robotto Obomi" (Japanese: 遊馬vsお掃除ロボット オボミ)	Yasuyuki Suzuki	August 29, 2011	April 28, 2012
22	22	"The Shark Hunter" / "The Seized Emperor's Key! Showdown, Kite VS Shark"; Transliteration: "Ubawareta Ou no Kagi! Gekitotsu Kaito vs Shāku" (Japanese: 奪われた皇の鍵! 激突カイトvsシャーク)	Shin Yoshida	September 5, 2011	May 5, 2012
23	23	"Hunting Down The Hunter: Part 1" / "The Destined Duel! Astral VS Kite"; Transliteration: "Shukumei no Kettou! Asutoraru VS Kaito" (Japanese: 宿命の決闘！アストラルvsカイト)	Shin Yoshida	September 12, 2011	May 12, 2012
24	24	"Hunting Down The Hunter: Part 2" / "The Soul's Xyz Summon! ZEXAL"; Transliteration: "Tamashii no Ekushīzu Shōkan! Zearu" (Japanese: 魂のエクシーズ召喚！ZEXAL)	Shin Yoshida	September 19, 2011	May 19, 2012
25	25	"Frozen in Time" / "The Time Comes, Three Suns Appear"; Transliteration: "Toki no Otozore, Arawareshi Mittsu no Taiyō" (Japanese: 時の訪れ 現われし3つの太陽)	Shin Yoshida	October 3, 2011	August 18, 2012

=== Season 2: World Duel Carnival (2011–12) ===
No. overall	No. in season	English dub title / Japanese translated title	Written by	Original release date	American air date
26	1	"Let the Duels Begin" / "Begin! World Duel Carnival!"; Transliteration: "Kaimaku! Wārudo Dueru Kānibaru" (Japanese: 開幕！WDC)	Shin Yoshida	October 10, 2011	August 25, 2012
27	2	"A Team Performance" / "WDC Kickoff! The Flame Striker, Striker"; Transliteration: "Wārudo Dueru Kānibaru Kikku Ofu! Honō no Sutoraikā Kunitachi Kakeru" (Japanese: WDCキックオフ！炎のストライカー・国立カケル)	Tsutomu Kamishiro	October 17, 2011	September 1, 2012
28	3	"Heavy Metal" / "Construction Site Duel! Destroy the Construction Equipment Deck!!"; Transliteration: "Kōjigenba Dueru! Jūki Dekki wo Uchiyabure!!" (Japanese: 工事現場デュエル！ 重機デッキを打ち破れ！！)	Toshimitsu Takeuchi	October 24, 2011	September 8, 2012
29	4	"Love Hurts" / "Railroad Deck Takeoff! Runaway Duelist Anna"; Transliteration: "Tetsubō Dekki Hasshin! Bakusō Duerisuto Anna" (Japanese: 鉄道デッキ発進！暴走決闘者アンナ)	Yoshifumi Fukushima	October 31, 2011	September 15, 2012
30	5	"No Tomato" / "Yuma's Greatest Ordeal! Fight to Death, Vegetable Death Match"; Transliteration: "Yūma Saidai no Shiren! Shidō, Yassai Desumacchi" (Japanese: 遊馬最大の試練！ 死闘、野菜デスマッチ)	Kenichi Yamashita	November 7, 2011	September 22, 2012
31	6	"Life Is a Carnival: Part 1" / "His Name is Charlie, the Man with the Strongest Luck in History"; Transliteration: "Sono Mei wa Chari! Shijo Saikyo no Un wo Motsu Otoko" (Japanese: その名はチャーリー！史上最強の運を持つ男)	Shin Yoshida	November 14, 2011	September 29, 2012
32	7	"Life Is a Carnival: Part 2" / "Invincible Luck! Number 7: Lucky Straight"; Transliteration: "Muteki no Kyōin! Numbāzu Nana Rakkī Sutoraipu" (Japanese: 無敵の強運！No.7 ラッキー・ストライプ)	Yasuyuki Suzuki	November 21, 2011	October 6, 2012
33	8	"Foolish Fans" / "Tag Duel of Hell! Fiendish Hero Quattro"; Transliteration: "Jigoku no Taggu Dueru! Akuma no Hīrō Fō" (Japanese: 地獄のタッグデュエル！悪魔のヒーローIV)	Shin Yoshida	November 28, 2011	October 13, 2012
34	9	"Shark Bait" / "The Determined Revenge, Tragic Duelist, Shark"; Transliteration: "Ketsui no Fukushū Kanashiki Dyuerisuto Shāku" (Japanese: 決意の復讐 哀しき決闘者シャーク)	Shin Yoshida	December 5, 2011	October 20, 2012
35	10	"Bad Developments: Part 1" / "The Shocking Scoop, Tori's Dangerous Future!"; Transliteration: "Shōgeki no Sukūpu! Kotori no Kiken-na Mirai!" (Japanese: 衝撃のスクープ！小鳥の危険な未来)	Tsutomu Kamishiro	December 12, 2011	October 27, 2012
36	11	"Bad Developments: Part 2" / "The Power to Create the Future! Utopia Ray"; Transliteration: "Mirai wo Kiri Hiraku Chikara! Kibō Hōpu Rei" (Japanese: 未来を切り開く力！希望皇ホープレイ)	Tsutomu Kamishiro	December 19, 2011	November 3, 2012
37	12	"Double Jeopardy: Part 1" / "Disqualified from the WDC!? Heartland's Assassins, Dextra and Nistro"; Transliteration: "Daburu Di Shi Shikkaku!? Hātorando no Shikyaku Dorowa ando Gōshu" (Japanese: WDC失格!? ハートランドの刺客ドロワ&ゴーシュ)	Yoshifumi Fukushima	December 26, 2011	November 10, 2012
38	13	"Double Jeopardy: Part 2" / "Bound To Hope! Hope Sword Mars Slash!!"; Transliteration: "Kibō wo Tsunage! Hōpu Ken Māzu Surasshu!!" (Japanese: 希望をつなげ! ホープ剣マーズ・スラッシュ!!)	Yoshifumi Fukushima	January 9, 2012	November 17, 2012
39	14	"Pets Peeved" / "The Destined Showdown! Cathy VS Pip"; Transliteration: "Shukumei no Taiketsu! Kyatto-chan VS Doggu-chan" (Japanese: 話宿命の対決！キャットちゃんvsドッグちゃん)	Kenichi Yamashita	January 16, 2012	November 24, 2012
40	15	"About Hart" / "Visitor from Heartland: Hart"; Transliteration: "Hātorando Kara Raihōsha Haruto" (Japanese: ハートランドから来訪者 ハルト)	Yasuyuki Suzuki	January 23, 2012	December 1, 2012
41	16	"Losing Hart" / "Missing Hart! The New Enemy: Vetrix"; Transliteration: "Kieta Haruto! Aratanaru Teki: Toron" (Japanese: 消えたハルト！新たなる敵 トロン)	Tsutomu Kamishiro	January 30, 2012	December 8, 2012
42	17	"A Dubious Duo" / "Yuma & Kite: A Spirited Tag Duel"; Transliteration: "Yūma to Kaito Tamashii no Taggu Dyueru" (Japanese: 遊馬とカイト 魂のタッグ・デュエル)	Shin Yoshida	February 6, 2012	December 15, 2012
43	18	"The Dragon Awakens" / "The Miraculous Overlay! Neo Galaxy-Eyes Photon Dragon"; Transliteration: "Kiseki no Ōbārei! Neo Garakushī Aizu Foton Doragon" (Japanese: 奇跡のオーバーレイ！超銀河眼の光子龍)	Shin Yoshida	February 13, 2012	December 22, 2012
44	19	"Rock and a Hard Place" / "The Forked Paths of Destiny! Yuma Throws Away Dueling!"; Transliteration: "Unmei no Wakaremichi! Dyueru wo Suteta Yūma!" (Japanese: 運命の分かれ道！デュエルを捨てた遊馬！)	Yasuyuki Suzuki	February 20, 2012	December 29, 2012
45	20	"Ruffled Feathers" / "A Nemesis Shows Up Late! The Sparrow VS Nistro"; Transliteration: "Okuretekita Kyōteki! Robin VS Gōshu" (Japanese: 遅れてきた強敵！ロビンVSゴーシ)	Tsutomu Kamishiro	February 27, 2012	January 19, 2013
46	21	"Family Leave" / "For the Sake of Family... The Gentle Avenger: Trey!!"; Transliteration: "Kazoku no Tameni... Yasashiki Fukushūsha Surī!!" (Japanese: 家族のために...優しき復讐者・III！！)	Kenichi Yamashita	March 5, 2012	January 26, 2013
47	22	"Sky's the Limit" / "Yuma's Denied!? The Stolen "Feeling the Flow"!"; Transliteration: "Yūma ga Kiken!? Ubawareta "Kattobingu"!" (Japanese: 遊馬が棄権!? 奪われた「かっとビング！」)	Shin Yoshida	March 12, 2012	February 2, 2013
48	23	"Exit: Astral" / "Astral, Dead...!?"; Transliteration: "Asutoraru, Shisu...!?" (Japanese: アストラル、死す...!?)	Shin Yoshida	March 19, 2012	February 9, 2013
49	24	"Crestfallen" / "The End of a Fierce Fight! Utopia Ray VS Atlandis"; Transliteration: "Gekitō no Hate! Hōpu Rei VS Atorantaru" (Japanese: 激闘の果て！ホープレイVSアトランタル)	Shin Yoshida	March 26, 2012	February 16, 2013

=== Season 3: World Duel Carnival Finals (2012) ===
No. overall	No. in season	English dub title / Japanese translated title	Written by	Original release date	American air date
50	1	"Party Panic" / "The Eve of the Storm! The Diabolical Duelist Vetrix Appears!"; Transliteration: "Haran no Enyasa! Sugata o Arawashita Akuma no Dyuerisuto Toron" (Japanese: 波乱の前夜祭！姿を現した悪魔の決闘者・トロン)	Yasuyuki Suzuki	April 9, 2012	February 23, 2013
51	2	"Roller Duel" / "Head to the Finals! The Duel Coaster is Ready to GO!"; Transliteration: "Ikuza Kesshō Taikai! Dyueru Kōsutā de GO!" (Japanese: 行くぜ決勝大会！デュエル・コースターでGO！)	Tsutomu Kamishiro	April 16, 2012	March 2, 2013
52	3	"Roller Coaster Rampage!" / "The Duel Coaster VS The Roaring Express"; Transliteration: "Dyueru Kōsutā VS Bakusō Ressha!!" (Japanese: デュエル・コースターVS爆走列車!!)	Tsutomu Kamishiro	April 23, 2012	March 9, 2013
53	4	"Test Your Luck!" / "The Fated Rail: Try Your Luck On A Trap Card!?"; Transliteration: "Unmei no Rēru, Wana Kādo de Un Tameshi!?" (Japanese: 運命のレール 罠カードで運試し!?)	Tsutomu Kamishiro	April 30, 2012	March 16, 2013
54	5	"Welcome to the Jungle" / "Vetrix VS Dextra: The Deadly Butterfly's Invitation! A Life-or-Death Jungle Field"; Transliteration: "Toron VS Dorowa: Shishō no Sasoi! Inochigake no Jangaru Fīrudo" (Japanese: トロンVSドロワ 死蝶の誘い！命懸けのヂャンガルフィールド)	Yasuyuki Suzuki	May 7, 2012	March 23, 2013
55	6	"Portal of Doom" / "Galaxy-Eyes Sealed!? A Cosmic-Class Number Appears!"; Transliteration: "Gyarakushīaizu Fūin!? Uchū-kyū Nanbāzu Arawaru!" (Japanese: ギャラクシー・アイズ封印!? 宇宙級ナンバーズあらわる！)	Shin Yoshida	May 14, 2012	March 30, 2013
56	7	"Cosmic Chaos" / "The Great Decisive Battle of Outer Space! Neo Galaxy-Eyes' Counterattack"; Transliteration: "Uchū Daisakusen! Neo Gyarakushīaizu no Gyakushū" (Japanese: 宇宙大決戦！ネオ・ギャラクシーアイズの逆襲)	Shin Yoshida	May 21, 2012	April 6, 2013
57	8	"Depths of Darkness" / "Shark Torpedoed! The Nightmarish Fan Service"; Transliteration: "Shāku Gekisan! Akumu no Fansābisu" (Japanese: シャーク撃沈！悪夢のファンサービス)	Tsutomu Kamishiro	May 28, 2012	April 13, 2013
58	9	"Swimming With Sharks" / "Shark Reawakens! A New Chaos Number Appears"; Transliteration: "Shāku Kakusei! Aratanaru Kaosu Nanbāzu Arawaru" (Japanese: シャーク覚醒！新たなるカオス・ナンバーズあらわる)	Tsutomu Kamishiro	June 4, 2012	April 20, 2013
59	10	"Rockin' and Rollin'" / "A Fierce Fight! Yuma VS Nistro: This is my Dueling Soul"; Transliteration: "Gekisen! Yūma VS Gōshu Kore ga Ore no Dyueru Tamashii" (Japanese: 激戦！遊馬VSゴーシュ これがオレのデュエル魂)	Yoshifumi Fukushima	June 11, 2012	April 27, 2013
60	11	"Doctor Visit" / "Prelude to the Ultimate Decisive Battle: A New Enemy, Dr. Faker"; Transliteration: "Kessen-he no Jyoshō Aratanaru Teki Dokutā Feikā" (Japanese: 決戦への序章 新たなる敵Dr.フェイカー)	Yoshifumi Fukushima	June 18, 2012	May 4, 2013
61	12	"Duel of Destiny: Part 1" / "The Disappearing Bonds! Yuma VS Shark, the Fated Duel!!"; Transliteration: "Kiekaketa Kizuna! Yūma VS Shāku, Shukumei no Dyueru!!" (Japanese: 消えかけた絆！遊馬VSシャーク、宿命の決闘！！)	Tsutomu Kamishiro	June 25, 2012	May 11, 2013
62	13	"Duel of Destiny: Part 2" / "Shark's Back! The Bonds Connected by "Feeling the Flow!""; Transliteration: "Yomigaere Shāku! Kizuna ni Kaketa "Kattobingu!"" (Japanese: 蘇れシャーク！絆に懸けた「かっとビング！」)	Tsutomu Kamishiro	July 2, 2012	May 18, 2013
63	14	"The Hart of the Matter" / "The Scheme of a Horrifying Darkness! Vetrix's True Form Is Revealed!?"; Transliteration: "Osorubeki Yami no Sakuryaku! Abakareta Toron no Shōtai!?" (Japanese: 恐るべき闇の策略！暴かれたトロンの正体!?)	Yasuyuki Suzuki	July 9, 2012	May 25, 2013
64	15	"Change of Hart" / "Roar, Neo Galaxy-Eyes! The Brothers' Bond that Shatters the Darkness"; Transliteration: "Neo Gyarakushīaizu Hōkō!! Yami o Kudaku Kyōdai no Kizuna!" (Japanese: ネオギャラクシーアイズ咆哮！ 闇を砕く兄弟の絆！)	Yasuyuki Suzuki	July 16, 2012	June 1, 2013
65	16	"Sphere of Fear: Part 1" / "An All-Out War Between Numbers! Yuma VS Vetrix! The Surprising Duel in a Super-Strange Space"; Transliteration: "Nanbāzu Sōryokusen! Yūma VS Toron! Kyōi Chōikūkan Dyueru!" (Japanese: ナンバーズ総力戦！ 遊馬VSトロン！驚異の超異空間デュエル！)	Shin Yoshida	July 23, 2012	June 15, 2013
66	17	"Sphere of Fear: Part 2" / "The Terrifying Duel! Arise, Hero of Bonds, ZEXAL!"; Transliteration: "Senritsu no Dyueru! Tachiagare Kizuna no Eiyū Zearu!!!" (Japanese: 戦慄のデュエル！立ち上がれ絆の英雄ゼアル!!!)	Shin Yoshida	July 30, 2012	June 22, 2013
67	18	"Sphere of Fear: Part 3" / "Believe in Victory! The Final Shining Draw!"; Transliteration: "Shōri wo Shinjite! Fainaru Shainingu Dorō!" (Japanese: 勝利を信じて！ファイナル・シャイニング・ドロー！)	Shin Yoshida	August 13, 2012	June 29, 2013
68	19	"The Countdown Begins" / "Prelude to Ruin: The Threat of the Sphere Field Cannon!"; Transliteration: "Hōkai he no Jyokyoku Sufia Fīrudo Hō no Kyōi!" (Japanese: 崩壊への序曲 スフィア・フィールド砲の脅威！)	Tsutomu Kamishiro	August 20, 2012	July 6, 2013
69	20	"A Trio's Challenge: Part 1" / "The Three Heroes Unite, One Last Duel For The Future!"; Transliteration: "Tsudoishi San Yūshi, Mirai wo Kaketa Rasuto Dyueru!" (Japanese: 集いし三勇士(さんゆうし)、 未来を賭けたラストデュエル！)	Shin Yoshida	August 27, 2012	July 13, 2013
70	21	"A Trio's Challenge: Part 2" / "The Most Evil, Horrifying Dragon Appears! The False Skeletal God Dragon, Heart-eartH Dragon"; Transliteration: "Senritsu no Saikyōryū Arawaru! Gigaishinryū Hātoāsu Doragon" (Japanese: 戦慄の最凶龍現る！偽骸神龍ハートアース・ドラゴン)	Shin Yoshida	September 3, 2012	July 20, 2013
71	22	"A Trio's Challenge: Part 3" / "The Miraculous Feeling the Flow! ZEXAL, Open The Path to the Future!!"; Transliteration: "Kiseki no Kattobingu! Mirai wo Kirihirake, Zearu!!" (Japanese: 奇跡のかっとビング！未来を切り開けゼアル!!)	Shin Yoshida	September 10, 2012	July 27, 2013
72	23	"Kite's Plight: Part 1" / "The Time For The Showdown!! Yuma VS Kite, The True Finals of the World Duel Carnival"; Transliteration: "Shiyūkessuru Toki!! Yūma VS Kaito, Wārudo Dyeru Kānibaru Mō Hitotsu no Kesshūsen!" (Japanese: 雌雄決する時！！遊馬VSカイト、WDCもう一つの決勝戦！)	Yasuyuki Suzuki	September 17, 2012	August 3, 2013
73	24	"Kite's Plight: Part 2" / "The Illusive Great Clash!! Double Utopia VS Double Galaxy-Eyes!!"; Transliteration: "Maboroshi no Daigekitō!! Daburu Hōpu VS Daburu Garakushī Aizu!!" (Japanese: 幻の大激突！！ダブル希望皇VSダブル銀河眼！！)	Yasuyuki Suzuki	September 24, 2012	August 10, 2013

== Zexal II episode list ==
=== Season 4: Barian Invasion (2012–13) ===
No. overall	No. in season	English dub title / Japanese translated title	Written by	Original release date	American air date
74	1	"Attack of the Barians: Part 1" / "Barian Invasion! The Frightening Chaos Xyz Evolution"; Transliteration: "Barian Shūrai! Kyōgaku no Kaosu Ekushīzu Chenji!!" (Japanese: バリアン襲来! 驚愕のカオス・エクシーズ・チェンジ!!)	Shin Yoshida	October 7, 2012	August 17, 2013
75	2	"Attack of the Barians: Part 2" / "The Winning Formula: Crush the Chaos Xyz"; Transliteration: "Soroe Shōri no Hōteishiki: Uchikudake Kaosu Ekushīzu" (Japanese: 揃え勝利の方程式 打ち砕けカオス・エクシーズ)	Shin Yoshida	October 14, 2012	August 24, 2013
76	3	"Hard Knox" / "Here I am, for the Greater Good! My Name is Ray Shadows"; Transliteration: "Yokare to Omotte Tadaima Sanjō! Shingetsu Rei to Mōshimasu" (Japanese: よかれと思ってただいま参上! 真月零と申します)	Yasuyuki Suzuki	October 21, 2012	August 31, 2013
77	4	"Rule Duel" / "Dueling Is Against School Rules!? Sally Forth! The Chief Disciplinarian"; Transliteration: "Dyueru no Midare wa Kōsoku Ihan!? Shutsugeki! Tokumei Fūki Komandā" (Japanese: デュエルの乱れは校則違反!? 出撃！ 特命風紀コマンダー)	Gō Zappa	October 28, 2012	September 7, 2013
78	5	"The Adventures of Artimus Stanleyus" / "Shark's Rage!! Save The Captured Sister!"; Transliteration: "Shāku Gekkō!! Torawareta Imōto o Sukue!" (Japanese: シャーク激昂!! 捕らわれた妹を救え！)	Mitsutaka Hirota	November 4, 2012	September 14, 2013
79	6	"Doom in Bloom" / "Frozen Fury!! Rio Kastle, the Ice Queen"; Transliteration: "Hyōketsu Ranbu! Kōri no Jyoō Kamishiro Rio" (Japanese: 氷結乱舞!! 氷の女王 神代璃緒)	Mitsutaka Hirota	November 11, 2012	September 21, 2013
80	7	"Rivals in the Ring" / "A Fierce One-on-One Battle!! Yuma VS Alito, the Determined Fighter"; Transliteration: "Mōkō Taiman Batoru!! Yūma vs Fukutsu no Tōshi Arito" (Japanese: 猛攻タイマンバトル!! 遊馬 VS 不屈の闘士アリト)	Gō Zappa	November 18, 2012	September 28, 2013
81	8	"The Friendship Games" / "Tori's Chaos Xyz Evolution!? The Tumultuous Sports Duel Tournament"; Transliteration: "Kotori ga Kaosu Ekushīzu Chenji!? Haran no Supōtsu Dyueru Taikai" (Japanese: 小鳥がカオスエクシーズ・チェンジ!? 波乱のスポーツデュエル大会)	Shin Yoshida	November 25, 2012	October 5, 2013
82	9	"Sphere Cube Calamity: Part 1" / "The Lone Barian Knight: Mizar, the Galaxy-Eyes Master Appears"; Transliteration: "Kokō no Barian Naito Gyarakushī Aizu Tsukai Mizaeru Arawaru" (Japanese: 孤高のバリアン騎士 銀河眼使いミザエル現る)	Gō Zappa	December 9, 2012	October 12, 2013
83	10	"Sphere Cube Calamity: Part 2" / "The Astronomical Dimensional Dragon!! Galaxy-Eyes Tachyon Dragon"; Transliteration: "Chōdokyūjigenryū!! Gyarakushī Aizu Takion Doragon" (Japanese: 超弩級次元竜!! 銀河眼の時空竜)	Gō Zappa	December 16, 2012	October 19, 2013
84	11	"Playing Defense" / "Rise Up! Yuma VS Shark, A Healing Duel"; Transliteration: "Yomigaere!! Yūma VS Shāku Fukkatsu no Dyueru" (Japanese: 蘇れ!!遊馬VSシャーク復活の決闘)	Gō Zappa	December 23, 2012	October 26, 2013
85	12	"Counter Offensive: Part 1" / "A Lightning–Speed Counter Battle! Alito, The Determined Fighter!"; Transliteration: "Shippū Jinrai no Kauntā Batoru! Ketsui no Tōshi Arito" (Japanese: 疾風迅雷のカウンターバトル！決意の闘士アリト)	Yasuyuki Suzuki	January 6, 2013	November 2, 2013
86	13	"Counter Offensive: Part 2" / "Roar! Chaos Number: The Final Blow to Yuma"; Transliteration: "Unare! Kaosu Nanbāzu: Yūma ni Muketa Fainaru Burō" (Japanese: 唸れ！カオス・ナンバーズ 遊馬に向けたファイナルブロー)	Yasuyuki Suzuki	January 12, 2013	November 9, 2013
87	14	"Dual Duel: Part 1" / "Girag's Brutal Assault! Explode Forth, Bukotsu the Pressure Point-Striking Delinquent"; Transliteration: "Gilagu Mōshū! Sakuretsu, Hikō Shibaku Bukotsu" (Japanese: ギラグ猛襲！炸裂、秘孔死爆無惚)	Mitsutaka Hirota	January 20, 2013	November 16, 2013
88	15	"Dual Duel: Part 2" / "The Pulse of V: A Super Rebirth, Utopia Ray V!!"; Transliteration: "Bui no Kodō: Chōshinsei Hōpurei Bui!!" (Japanese: Vの鼓動 超新生ホープレイV!!)	Mitsutaka Hirota	January 27, 2013	November 23, 2013
89	16	"Darkness Dawns" / "The United Front Against Dark Astral: A Challenge to the Giant of Shadows!!"; Transliteration: "Kyōtō Dāku Asutoraru Kage no Kyojin-e no Chōsen!!" (Japanese: 共闘ダークアストラル 影の巨人への挑戦！！)	Shin Yoshida	February 3, 2013	November 30, 2013
90	17	"You Give Love a Bot Name" / "Operation: Save Lillybot!? I, Who Am In Love, Am Invincible, Roger"; Transliteration: "Obomi Dakkan Sakusen!? Koisuru oira wa Muteki de Arimasu" (Japanese: オボミ奪還作戦！？恋スルオイラハ無敵デアリマス)	Touko Machida	February 10, 2013	December 7, 2013
91	18	"Take a Chance" / "Shark VS Rio: The 100th Dueling Squabble"; Transliteration: "Shāku VS Rio: Hyakku-senme no Kenka Dyueru!!" (Japanese: シャークvs璃緒 100戦目の喧嘩デュエル!!)	Mitsutaka Hirota	February 17, 2013	December 14, 2013
92	19	"An Imperfect Couple: Part 1" / "A Fierce Couple Duel: "That Anna Chick" and I are a Tag Team!?"; Transliteration: "Gekisen Kappuru Dyueru "Anna Yatsu" to Ore ga Taggu!?" (Japanese: 激戦カップルデュエル ｢アンナ奴｣と俺がタッグ!?)	Gō Zappa	February 24, 2013	January 11, 2014
93	20	"An Imperfect Couple: Part 2" / "Self Sacrificing Love: Yuma, I've Entrusted You With My Last Draw!!"; Transliteration: "Kenshinteki Ai: Yūma ni Takuta Rasuto Dorō!!" (Japanese: 献身的な愛 遊馬に託したラストドロー!!)	Gō Zappa	March 3, 2013	January 18, 2014
94	21	"Enter Vector" / "Shadows's Crisis! The Attack of Vector, the Manipulator!"; Transliteration: "Shingetsu no Kiki! Anyakusha Bekutā no Shūgeki" (Japanese: 裏目の危機！暗躍者ベクターの襲撃)	Yasuyuki Suzuki	March 10, 2013	January 25, 2014
95	22	"The Search for Shadows" / "Let's Go, To the Land of the Final Battle! Airship of the Emperor's Key, Liftoff!!"; Transliteration: "Iza Kessen no Chi e! Ō no Kagi no Hikōsen, Hasshin!" (Japanese: いざ決戦の地へ！皇の鍵の飛行船、発進！！)	Touko Machida	March 17, 2013	February 1, 2014
96	23	"Shadows of Deception" / "The Mad Vector - Battle Atop the Ominous Sargasso!"; Transliteration: "Kyouki no Bekutā: Makyou Sarugasso no Tatakai!" (Japanese: 狂気のベクター 魔境サルガッソの闘い！)	Mitsutaka Hirota	March 24, 2013	February 8, 2014
97	24	"Sinister Shadows" / "Countdown to Defeat! The Terror of Deck Destruction!"; Transliteration: "Haiboku-he no Kauntodaun! Dekki Hakai no Kyoufu" (Japanese: 敗北へのカウントダウン！ デッキ破壊の恐怖)	Mitsutaka Hirota	March 31, 2013	February 15, 2014
98	25	"Shadows End" / "Break Through the Limit!! "King of Wishes, Utopia Ray Victory""; Transliteration: "Genkai Toppa!! "Kibō Ō Hōpurei Vikutorī"" (Japanese: 限界突破!!「希望皇ホープレイ・ヴィクトリー」)	Gō Zappa	April 7, 2013	February 22, 2014

=== Season 5: Mythrian Number War (2013) ===
No. overall	No. in season	English dub title / Japanese translated title	Written by	Original release date	American air date
99	1	"A Duel in Ruins: Part 1" / "Restart the Airship! Aim for the Legendary Numbers!!"; Transliteration: "Hikōsen Saikidō! Densetsu no Nanbāzu wo Mazase!!" (Japanese: 飛行船再起動! 伝説のNo.を目指せ!!)	Shin Yoshida	April 14, 2013	March 1, 2014
100	2	"A Duel in Ruins: Part 2" / "Recollection Toward Antiquity - Dumon and the White Steed, A Legendary Vision"; Transliteration: "Inishie e no Tsuioku: Dorube to Hakuba Densetsu no Gen'ei" (Japanese: 古への追憶 ドルベと白馬伝説の幻影)	Shin Yoshida	April 21, 2013	March 8, 2014
101	3	"The Dark Mist Rises: Part 1" / "The Cunning Vector - Astral VS Number 96"; Transliteration: "Kōkatsu-naru Bekutā: Asutoraru VS Nanbāzu Kyū-jū-roku" (Japanese: 狡猾なるベクター アストラルVSNo. 96)	Mitsutaka Hirota	April 28, 2013	March 15, 2014
102	4	"The Dark Mist Rises: Part 2" / "Realm of Chaos - Number 96, the Incarnation of Insanity!! Transliteration: "Kaosu no Ryōiki: Nanbāzu 96 Kyōki no Keshin!!" (Japanese: 混沌(カオス)の領域 No.96狂気の化身!!)	Mitsutaka Hirota	May 5, 2013	March 22, 2014
103	5	"Barian Vengeance: Part 1" / "Alito, the Silent Fighter - Reunion of the Passionate Duelists!"; Transliteration: "Chinmoku no Tōshi Arito Atsuki Dyuerisuto-tachi no Saikai!" (Japanese: 沈黙の闘士アリト熱き決闘者たちの再会！)	Gō Zappa	May 12, 2013	March 29, 2014
104	6	"Barian Vengeance: Part 2" / "Be Revived! The Duelist Soul That Transcends Life!!"; Transliteration: "Yomigaere! Inochi o Koeshi Dyuerisuto Tamashii!!" (Japanese: よみがえれ！ 命を超えし決闘者魂!!)	Gō Zappa	May 19, 2013	April 5, 2014
105	7	"Put to the Test: Part 1" / "The Trial of the Galaxy-Eyes User! Kite's Do-Or-Die Duel"; Transliteration: "Garakushīaizu Tsukai e no Shiren! Kaito Kesshi no Dyueru" (Japanese: 銀河眼使いへの試練！カイト決死のデュエル)	Touko Machida	May 26, 2013	April 12, 2014
106	8	"Put to the Test: Part 2" / "The Legend of Mizar! The Divine Dragon That Became a Number"; Transliteration: "Mizaeru Densetsu! Nanbāzu Tonatta Kami no Ryū" (Japanese: ミザエル伝説！ No.となった神の龍)	Touko Machida	June 2, 2013	April 19, 2014
107	9	"Furry Fury" / "Yuma Confused!? The Unreliable Account of Girag, the Tanuki"; Transliteration: "Bakasareta Yūma!? Giragu Tanuki no Kawazan'yō" (Japanese: 化かされた遊馬!? ギラグ狸の皮算用)	Yasuyuki Suzuki	June 9, 2013	April 26, 2014
108	10	"A Sea of Troubles: Part 1" / "Temptation from the Bottom of the Sea! Shark's Dream-like Memory"; Transliteration: "Kaitei kara no Sasoi! Shāku Mugen no Kioku" (Japanese: 海底からの誘い！シャーク夢幻の記憶)	Shin Yoshida	June 16, 2013	May 3, 2014
109	11	"A Sea of Troubles: Part 2" / "Shark VS the Raging Waterfall God - Abyss! Collision, the Two Numbers!!"; Transliteration: "Shāku VS Gekirōshin Abisu! Gekitō, Futari no Nanbāzu!!" (Japanese: シャークvs激瀧神アビス！激突、2体のNo．！！)	Shin Yoshida	June 23, 2013	May 10, 2014
110	12	"A World of Chaos: Part 1" / "The Three Worlds That Will Be Destroyed! Ultimate, Rampaging Number 96!!"; Transliteration: "Horobi-yuku Santsu no Sekai! Kyūkyoku Bōsō Nanbāzu Kyūjūroku!!" (Japanese: 滅びゆく3つの世界！ 究極暴走No．96！！)	Mitsutaka Hirota	June 30, 2013	May 17, 2014
111	13	"A World of Chaos: Part 2" / "Moment of Doomsday! Bonds Entrusted to a Partner"; Transliteration: "Shūen no Toki...! Aibō ni Takushita Kizuna" (Japanese: 終焉のとき．．．！ 相棒に託した絆)	Mitsutaka Hirota	July 7, 2013	May 24, 2014
112	14	"Memory Thief: Part 1" / "A Pure-Hearted Duelist! Start Up the Chronomaly!!"; Transliteration: "Junshin-naru Dyuerisuto! Ōpātsu Shidō!!" (Japanese: 純真なる決闘者！ 先史遺産｣始動！！)	Gō Zappa	July 14, 2013	May 31, 2014
113	15	"Memory Thief: Part 2" / "The Power of a New Hope!! Combination of Friendship - Atlandis Utopia"; Transliteration: "Atarashiki Kibō no Chikara!! Yūjō Gattai Atorantaru Hōpu" (Japanese: 新しき希望の力！！ 友情合体｢アトランタルホープ)	Gō Zappa	July 21, 2013	June 7, 2014
114	16	"Tentacles of Terror: Part 1" / "Duelists of Sorrow: The Gimmicks Puppets' Rumble of Darkness!!"; Transliteration: "Hiai-naru Dyuerisuto "Gimikku Pappetto" Meidō" (Japanese: 悲哀なる決闘者地獄人形ギミックパペット冥動!!)	Yasuyuki Suzuki	July 28, 2013	July 14, 2014 (Hulu)
115	17	"Tentacles of Terror: Part 2" / "Shark and Quattro's World-Shaking Mayhem!! The Hell-Shark Tag Team"; Transliteration: "Shāku to IV Tenka Sōrin!! Jigoku Zame Taggu" (Japanese: シャークとIV 天下騒乱!! 地獄ザメタッグ)	Yasuyuki Suzuki	August 4, 2013	July 21, 2014 (Hulu)
116	18	"Now or Never: Part 1" / "Stern Duelists: The Dyson Sphere Upheaval!!"; Transliteration: "Reigen Dyuerisuto "Daison Sufia" Gekidō!!" (Japanese: 冷厳なる決闘者 ダイソンスフィア激動!!)	Shin Yoshida	August 11, 2013	July 28, 2014 (Hulu)
117	19	"Now or Never: Part 2" / "Kite In a Frenzy: The Ultimate Teacher-And-Student Bloody Battle!!"; Transliteration: "Gyakujyō no Kaito Kyūkyoku no Shitei Kessen!!" (Japanese: 逆上のカイト 究極の師弟血戦!!)	Gō Zappa	August 18, 2013	August 4, 2014 (Hulu)
118	20	"Mission: Astral World, Part 1" / "Deity of the Holy Azure Land - Eliphas, the Radiant"; Transliteration: "Aoki Seichi no Kami Senkō no Erifas" (Japanese: 青き聖地の神 閃光のエリファス)	Shin Yoshida	August 25, 2013	August 11, 2014 (Hulu)
119	21	"Mission: Astral World, Part 2" / "Transcendental State! The Threatening Double Rank-Up!! Transliteration: "Kōjigen no Kyōchi! Kyōi no Daburu Ranku Appu!!" (Japanese: 高次元の境地！ 脅威のダブル・ランクアップ！)	Shin Yoshida	September 1, 2013	August 18, 2014 (Hulu)
120	22	"Mission: Astral World, Part 3" / "Clash of the Two Kings! An Ancient Duel - Shark VS Vector"; Transliteration: "Nidaiō Gekitō! Inishie no Kettō Shāku VS Bekutā" (Japanese: 二大王激突！ 古の決闘シャークVSベクター)	Shin Yoshida	September 8, 2013	August 25, 2014 (Hulu)
121	23	"Mission: Astral World, Part 4" / "Inheritor of the Light!! King of Wishes, Utopia Roots"; Transliteration: "Hikari o Tsugumono!! Kibō'ō Hōpu Rūtsu" (Japanese: 光を継ぐ者！！ 希望皇ホープルーツ)	Shin Yoshida	September 15, 2013	September 1, 2014 (Hulu)
122	24	"Assimilation: Part 1" / "A Sign of the World's Collapse!! Mr. Heartland's Grand Revolt"; Transliteration: "Sekai Kanraku no Zenchō!! Misutā Hātorando no Daihanran" (Japanese: 世界陥落の前兆！！ Mr．ハートランドの大反乱)	Mitsutaka Hirota	September 22, 2013	September 8, 2014 (Hulu)
123	25	"Assimilation: Part 2" / "The Hero's Triumphant Return! Carrying On a Friend's Will!!"; Transliteration: "Yūsha no Gaisen! Tomo no Ishi o Hikitsugu!!" (Japanese: 勇者の凱旋！ 友の意志を引き継げ！！)	Mitsutaka Hirota	September 29, 2013	September 15, 2014 (Hulu)

=== Season 6: Barian Emperor Onslaught (2013–14) ===
No. overall	No. in season	English dub title / Japanese translated title	Written by	Original release date	American air date
124	1	"Battle with the Barians" / "The Seven Barian Emperors! Soldiers of the Crimson World!!"; Transliteration: "Barian Nanakō! Akaki Sekai no Senshi!" (Japanese: バリアン七皇！ 紅き世界の戦士！！)	Gō Zappa	October 6, 2013	September 22, 2014 (Hulu)
125	2	"Fight for a Friend" / "The Immortal Spearman - Silent Honor Dark Knight"; Transliteration: "Fujimi no Sōjutsushi Sairento Onāzu Dāku Naito" (Japanese: 不死身の槍術士 S・H・Dark Knight)	Gō Zappa	October 13, 2013	September 29, 2014 (Hulu)
126	3	"Farewell for a Friend" / "Farewell, My Friend... Feelings Fallen into the Void!!"; Transliteration: "Saraba Tomo yo... Kokū e Chiru Omoi!!" (Japanese: さらば友よ．．． 虚空へ散る想い！！)	Gō Zappa, Shin Yoshida	October 20, 2013	October 6, 2014 (Hulu)
127	4	"Settling the Score, Part 1" / "The Unflinching Brother Combo - Tachyon Dragon Imprisoned!! Transliteration: "Fukutsu no Kyōdai Konbo Takion Doragon Yūhei!!" (Japanese: 不屈の兄弟コンボ 時空竜幽閉！！)	Mitsutaka Hirota	October 27, 2013	October 13, 2014 (Hulu)
128	5	"Settling the Score, Part 2" / "Tears of Separation... The Tyranny of Neo Galaxy-Eyes Tachyon Dragon!!"; Transliteration: "Wakare no Namida... Neo Gyarakushīaizu Takion Doragon no Bōi!!" (Japanese: 別れの涙．．． 超銀河眼の時空龍の暴威！！)	Mitsutaka Hirota	November 3, 2013	October 20, 2014 (Hulu)
129	6	"Fists of Fury, Part 1" / "The Shadow of Chaos - Yuma VS Alito the Tenacious Fighter"; Transliteration: "Konton no Kage Yūma VS Shūnen no Tōshi Arito" (Japanese: 混沌の影 遊馬VS執念の闘士アリト)	Shin Yoshida	November 10, 2013	October 27, 2014 (Hulu)
130	7	"Fists of Fury, Part 2" / "Fiery Fist of Awakening!! Alito's Time of Revival"; Transliteration: "Kakusei no Netsuken!! Arito Fukkatsu no Koku" (Japanese: 覚醒の熱拳!! アリト復活の刻)	Shin Yoshida	November 17, 2013	November 3, 2014 (Hulu)
131	8	"Power Play" / "Vector's Scorn - The Sundered Seven Emperors!! Transliteration: "Bekutā no Chōshō Hikisakareta Nanakō!!" (Japanese: ベクターの嘲笑 引き裂かれた七皇！！)	Gō Zappa	November 24, 2013	November 10, 2014 (Hulu)
132	9	"Barian VS Barian" / "My Body as a Shield! Dumon's Final Vow!"; Transliteration: "Wagami wo Tate ni! Dorube Saigo no Chikai!" (Japanese: 我が身を盾に！ ドルベ最後の誓い！)	Gō Zappa	December 8, 2013	November 17, 2014 (Hulu)
133	10	"Vector the Victor" / "A Goodbye is Only For a Moment... The Sad Fate of the Siblings"; Transliteration: "Wakare wa Setsuna... Kanashiki Kyōdai no Shukumei" (Japanese: 別れは刹那．．． 哀しき兄妹の宿命)	Gō Zappa, Shin Yoshida	December 15, 2013	November 24, 2014 (Hulu)
134	11	"Dragon Strife, Part 1" / "The Legend of the Revived Dragon Emperor!! Galaxy-Eyes Prime Photon Dragon"; Transliteration: "Yomigaeru Ryūkō Shinwa!! Gyarakushīaizu Puraimu Foton Doragon" (Japanese: 甦る竜皇神話！！ 銀河眼の光子竜皇)	Shin Yoshida	December 22, 2013	December 1, 2014 (Hulu)
135	12	"Dragon Strife, Part 2" / "The Future Is in This Hand! The Climax of the Galaxy Showdown!!"; Transliteration: "Mirai wo Kono Te ni! Gyarakushī Kessen Shūketsu!!" (Japanese: 未来をこの手に！ 銀河決戦終結！！)	Shin Yoshida	December 29, 2013	December 6, 2014 (Hulu)
136	13	"The Forsaken Palace" / "Sinister Memories! Nash VS Vector, the Devil!! Transliteration: "Kyōki no Kioku! Nasshu VS Majin Bekutā!!" (Japanese: 凶気の記憶！ ナッシュVS魔人ベクター！！)	Mitsutaka Hirota	January 12, 2014	December 14, 2014 (Hulu)
137	14	"Clash of the Emperors" / "Vector's Trifling! Bonds of Trapped Friendship!!"; Transliteration: "Bekutā no Honrō! Torawareta Nakama no Kizuna!!" (Japanese: ベクターの翻弄！ 捕われた仲間の絆！！)	Mitsutaka Hirota	January 19, 2014	December 21, 2014 (Hulu)
138	15	"The New World" / "A Being of Chaos - "Don Thousand" Emerges!!"; Transliteration: "Kaosu-taru Mono "Don Sauzando" Kōrai!!" (Japanese: 混沌たる存在 『ドン・サウザンド』光来！！)	Mitsutaka Hirota, Shin Yoshida	January 26, 2014	December 28, 2014 (Hulu)
139	16	"The Source Code" / "Cut Open a Path to the Future: Astral's Determination!!"; Transliteration: "Kirihiraku Mirai Asutoraru no Ketsudan!!" (Japanese: 切り開け未来 アストラルの決断!!)	Mitsutaka Hirota	February 2, 2014	January 4, 2015 (Hulu)
140	17	"A Thousand Ways To Lose" / "Our Feelings Are As One! The Dragon of Creation, "Numeron Dragon"; Transliteration: "Omoi wa Hitotsu ni! Souzouryuu "Numeron Doragon"" (Japanese: 想いはひとつに！ 創造龍 ヌメロン・ドラゴン)	Mitsutaka Hirota	February 9, 2014	January 11, 2015 (Hulu)
141	18	"The Fate of Three Worlds" / "The End of Chaos: The Deadly Final Hope Sword Slash"; Transliteration: "Konoton Shūen: Hissatsu no Fainaru Hōpu Ken Surasshu!!" (Japanese: 混沌終焉 必殺のファイナル・ホープ剣・スラッシュ!!)	Shin Yoshida	February 16, 2014	January 18, 2015 (Hulu)
142	19	"The Battle of Three Worlds" / "Final Hope!! We are "Beyond"; Transliteration: "Saigo no Kibō!! Ware wa "Biyondo"" (Japanese: 最後の希望！！ 我は「ビヨンド」)	Shin Yoshida	February 23, 2014	January 25, 2015 (Hulu)
143	20	"The Future of Three Worlds" / "The Aloof Duelist "Nash": The Destined Final Duel"; Transliteration: "Kokō no Dyueristo Nasshu Shukumei no Rasuto Dyueru!!" (Japanese: 孤高の決闘者『ナッシュ』 宿命のラストバトル!!)	Shin Yoshida	March 2, 2014	February 1, 2015 (Hulu)
144	21	"Last First Duel" / "The Ceremonial Battle!! Yuma VS Astral"; Transliteration: "Tatakai no Gi!! Yūma VS Asutoraru" (Japanese: 闘いの儀!! 遊馬VSアストラル)	Shin Yoshida	March 9, 2014	February 8, 2015 (Hulu)
145	22	"Outclassed And Outmatched" / "My Name is Astral" – The Ultimate Duelist"; Transliteration: "Waga Na wa Asutoraru Saikyō no Dyuerisuto" (Japanese: 『わが名はアストラル』 最強の決闘者!!)	Shin Yoshida	March 16, 2014	February 15, 2015 (Hulu)
146	23	"Forever ZEXAL" / "Our Bonds Are Forever... Let's All Feel The Flow!"; Transliteration: "Kizuna yo Towa ni... Kattobingu daze, Ore-tachi!" (Japanese: 絆よ永遠に... かっとビングだぜ、オレたち!!)	Shin Yoshida	March 23, 2014	February 22, 2015 (Hulu)

=== Specials ===
No.	Title	Original release date
1	"Aim for #1 in the World! Yu-Gi-Oh! Zexal Special with Guest Star Kōhei Uchimura"; Transliteration: "Mezase Sekaiichi! Yūgiō Zearu Uchimura Kōhei Senshu mo Deru yo Supesharu!" (Japanese: めざせ世界一！遊☆戯☆王ZEXAL 内村平手も出るよス航ペシャル村手)	September 17, 2012
A 9-minute special episode starring Olympic gold-medallist Kōhei Uchimura.
2	"Yu-Gi-Oh! Zexal II Special: A Basic Lecture of Dueling from Yuma and Astral"; Transliteration: "Yugiō Zearu Sekando Midokoro Tenko Sakari Supesharu" (Japanese: 「遊戯王Zexal II」みどころ てんこ盛りスペシャル)	December 6, 2012
In this special, Yuma Tsukumo and Astral teach dueling to beginners. The episode features a thorough dissection and analysis of the world of Yu-Gi-Oh! Zexal II. Also, the true nature of the mysterious Barians, and the mysterious power of the strange "Chaos Xyz" monsters are examined.
3	"Yu-Gi-Oh! Zexal II Special: Now! The Final Battle!"; Transliteration: "Yu-Gi-Oh! Zexal II: Iza! Saishuu Kessen e!! Special" (Japanese: 遊☆戯☆王ZEXALII 特別編 いざ！最終決戦へ!!)	December 5, 2013
Recap aired between Episodes 8 and 9 of Season 6

== See also ==
- List of Yu-Gi-Oh! Zexal II episodes (the follow-up series to Yu-Gi-Oh! Zexal)
