= Yasuyuki Suzuki =

Japanese anime and tokusatsu drama screenwriter

- 鈴木 やすゆき
- Born: Yasuyuki Suzuki
- Occupation: Screenwriter
- Writing career
- Pen name: 鈴木康之

Yasuyuki Suzuki (鈴木 やすゆき, Suzuki Yasuyuki) is a Japanese anime and tokusatsu screenwriter. He often participated in works of various anime and tokusatsu with screenwriters Shin Yoshida and Junichi Miyashita. The three of them were also members of the video game company Flagship, where they assisted in the development of many games as scenario writers.

== Filmography ==
=== Anime television series ===
- Saint Tail (1996) - Screenplay
- Z.O.E. Dolores, I (2001) - Screenplay
- Yu-Gi-Oh! Duel Monsters (2003–2004) - Screenplay
- Kurau Phantom Memory (2004) - Screenplay
- Yu-Gi-Oh! Duel Monsters GX (2004–2008) - Screenplay
- Speed Grapher (2005) - Screenplay
- Naruto (2005–2007) - Screenplay
- Naruto Shippuden (2008–2016) - Series Composition (episodes 54–71, 432–450), Screenplay
- Yu-Gi-Oh! 5D's (2008–2011) - Screenplay
- Yu-Gi-Oh! Zexal (2011–2012) - Screenplay
- Yu-Gi-Oh! Zexal II (2012–2013) - Screenplay
- The Reflection (TV anime) (2017) - Series Composition, Screenplay
- Muhyo & Roji's Bureau of Supernatural Investigation (2018) - Series Composition, Screenplay
- Actors: Songs Connection (2019) - Screenplay
- Muhyo & Roji`s Bureau of Supernatural Investigation Season 2 (2020) - Series Composition, Screenplay
- Hypnosis Mic: Division Rap Battle: Rhyme Anima (2020) - Screenplay
- Hypnosis Mic: Division Rap Battle: Rhyme Anima + (2023) - Screenplay
- Captain Tsubasa: Junior Youth Arc (2023) - Screenplay

=== TV Tokusatsu ===
- Representative Director Detective (1991) - Co-written 2 episodes with Junichi Miyashita
- Super Rescue Solbrain (1991–1992) - Co-written 2 episodes with Junichi Miyashita
- Special Rescue Exceedraft (1992–1993) - Co-written 3 episodes with Junichi Miyashita
- My Beloved Detective (1993) - Co-written 1 episode with Junichi Miyashita
- Tokusou Robo Janperson (1993–1994) - Co-written 4 episodes with Junichi Miyashita
- Blue SWAT (1994–1995) - Co-written 7 episodes with Junichi Miyashita

=== Original video animation ===
- Naruto Shippuden: Sunny-Side Battle!!! (2014) - Screenplay

=== Original net animation ===
- Intrigue in the Bakumatsu – Irohanihoheto (2007) - Screenplay

=== Video game ===
- Resident Evil – Code: Veronica (2000) - Scenario & Planning Support
- Bounty Hunter Sara: Holy Mountain no Teiō (2001) - Scenario
- Dino Stalker (2002) - Scenario
- Naruto Shippuden: Ultimate Ninja Storm Generations (2012) - Screenplay Support

=== Drama CD ===
- BIOHAZARD 2 Drama Album ~The young runaway, Sherry~ (1999) - Scenario
