= Yoshiyuki Nishi =

Japanese manga artist (born 1976)

Yoshiyuki Nishi (西 義之, Nishi Yoshiyuki; born December 27, 1976) is a Japanese manga artist best known for his work, Muhyo and Roji's Bureau of Supernatural Investigation. He is the former assistant of Takeshi Obata. Born and raised in Hachioji, Tokyo.

== Bibliography ==
- (2004) Muhyo to Roji no Mahōritsu Sōdan Jimusho (ムヒョとロージーの魔法律相談事務所); English translation: Muhyo and Roji's Bureau of Supernatural Investigation (2007)
- (2009) Bokke-san (ぼっけさん)
- (2013-2014) Hachi (ハチ)
- (2014) Mamono Kanteishi Babilo (魔物鑑定士バビロ)
- (2016) Lycanthrope Bouken Hoken (ライカンスロープ冒険保険)
