= Muhyo & Roji's Bureau of Supernatural Investigation =

Japanese manga series

- First tankōbon volume cover, featuring Toru Muhyo (left) and Jirō Kusano (right)

ムヒョとロージーの魔法律相談事務所 (Muhyo to Rōjī no Mahōritsu Sōdan Jimusho)
- Genre: Dark fantasy; Mystery; Supernatural
- Manga
- Written by: Yoshiyuki Nishi
- Published by: Shueisha
- English publisher: NA: Viz Media
- Imprint: Jump Comics
- Magazine: Weekly Shōnen Jump
- Original run: November 29, 2004 – March 3, 2008
- Volumes: 18
- Manga

Muhyo & Roji's Bureau of Supernatural Investigation: Magical Genus Magic Tool Master Chapter
- Written by: Yoshiyuki Nishi
- Published by: Shueisha
- Imprint: Jump Comics+
- Magazine: Shōnen Jump+
- Original run: March 19, 2018 – March 7, 2019
- Volumes: 2
- Anime television series
- Directed by: Nobuhiro Kondo
- Written by: Yasuyuki Suzuki
- Music by: Ryo Kawasaki
- Studio: Studio Deen (Note: Animation production assistance (アニメーション制作協力) for all episodes provided by Bridge.)
- Licensed by: Crunchyroll
- Original network: SKY PerfecTV!, Animax
- Original run: August 3, 2018 – September 22, 2020
- Episodes: 24
- icon

Muhyo & Roji's Bureau of Supernatural Investigation, (Note: Japanese: ムヒョとロージーの魔法律相談事務所, Hepburn: Muhyo to Rōjī no Mahōritsu Sōdan Jimusho) also known as simply Muhyo & Roji, is a Japanese manga series written and illustrated by Yoshiyuki Nishi. The series ran in Shueisha's shōnen manga magazine Weekly Shōnen Jump from November 2004 to March 2008, with its chapters collected in 18 tankōbon volumes. The series follows Toru Muhyo and Jiro "Roji" Kusano, a young magical law enforcer and his assistant, as they track down and punish spirits based on the articles written in the book of magical law.

An anime television series adaptation by Studio Deen aired from August to October 2018 on SKY PerfecTV! and Animax. A second season aired from July to September 2020.

The manga is licensed for English release in North America by Viz Media, which released the 18 volumes from October 2007 to August 2010 under its Shonen Jump manga line. The anime series has been streamed on Crunchyroll.

== Characters ==
Toru Muhyo (六氷 透, Muhyo Tōru) / Muhyo (ムヒョ)
Voiced by: Ayumu Murase (Japanese); Todd Haberkorn (English)
The youngest graduate of the Magical Law School to become a magical law enforcer. Partnered with Roji, he exorcises spirits with detached efficiency, showing no hesitation in delivering judgments. His abilities demand significant spiritual energy, leaving him frequently fatigued. Though outwardly indifferent toward Roji, he reveals concern in dangerous situations. Despite his abrasive demeanor, he upholds a strong sense of justice and possesses exceptional power, capable of performing high-level judgments alone. Even after conflict with Enchu, he seeks redemption rather than vengeance. He speaks the underworld's language, allowing him to command summoned creatures and halt punishments.
Jiro Kusano (草野 次郎, Kusano Jirō) / Roji (ロージー, Rōjī)
Voiced by: Yū Hayashi (Japanese); Khoi Dao (English)
Roji is Muhyo's kind-hearted but overly emotional assistant, often struggling to exorcise spirits with tragic stories. While knowledgeable about spirit types, he lacks formal training in magical law. His power fluctuates with confidence, sometimes revealing unexpected strength. Initially believing Muhyo dislikes him, Roji eventually learns his mentor deliberately chose him despite his lack of qualifications. He excels at creating restraining seals and once wielded an item normally reserved for higher-ranked practitioners.
Kenji Satō (佐藤 健二, Satō Kenji) / Kenji (ケンジ)
Voiced by: Kōhei Amasaki (Japanese); Dawn M. Bennett (English)
Kenji is a mischievous boy who initially dismisses Muhyo and Roji's exorcism business as fraudulent, even vandalizing their sign. His skepticism vanishes after they save him from a blood-drinking ghost he unintentionally released. Developing admiration for the duo, he nicknames Roji "Bean Sprout" and Muhyo "Onion". Despite Muhyo's rule against meeting clients after cases conclude, Kenji frequently visits their office under various pretexts.
Nana Takenouchi (竹乃内 菜々, Takenouchi Nana) / Nana (ナナ)
Voiced by: Iori Nomizu (Japanese); Morgan Lauré (English)
Nana is a photographer introduced to Muhyo and Roji by Kenji. Her late father's career producing fake ghost photos strained their relationship. After Muhyo helps purify her father's spirit, sending it to the River Styx for salvation, she becomes a recurring client. Nana's physical attractiveness frequently draws unwanted attention. She later discovers she possesses natural medium abilities.
Yoichi Himukai (火向 洋一, Himukai Yōichi) / Yoichi (ヨイチ)
Voiced by: Tetsuya Kakihara (Japanese); Ted Sroka (English)
Yoichi is a skilled magical law judge and Muhyo's childhood friend. Despite his lecherous behavior—including groping Nana upon their first meeting—he possesses considerable expertise, nearly matching Muhyo's knowledge. Though he once proposed partnering with Muhyo, Roji was chosen instead. Yoichi masters all forms of magical law except exorcism.
Soratsugu Madoka (円 宙継, Madoka Soratsugu) / Enchu (エンチュー, Enchū)
Voiced by: Hiroshi Kamiya (Japanese); Mark Whitten (English)
Enchu, Muhyo and Yoichi's childhood friend, was a studious magical law student who sought to become an enforcer to support his sick mother. When Muhyo's natural talent surpassed him and Muhyo was promoted first, Enchu snapped. Turning to forbidden magic, he gained inhuman abilities but retained some compassion, ultimately being redeemed before receiving an indefinite sentence in the Arcanum.
Yū Abiko (我孫子 優, Abiko Yū) / Biko (ビコ)
Voiced by: Rie Kawamura (Japanese); Bonnie Gordon (English)
Biko is a skilled magical toolmaker who cannot use the items she creates. Initially disliking her teacher Rio, she grew devoted to her after being saved from a failed experiment. Though shocked by Rio's betrayal, Biko still hoped for her redemption and dreamed of picking raspberries together. After Rio's imprisonment, they lived together under house arrest. Biko has three apprentices and was once mistaken for a boy by Roji.
Rio Kurotori (黒鳥 理緒, Kurotori Rio)
Voiced by: Satomi Akesaka (Japanese); Cherami Leigh (English)
Rio, Biko's teacher and a master magical toolmaker, secretly allied with Enchu after growing resentful when enforcers refused to save her mother from a spirit attack. Though fond of Biko, she initially believed redemption was impossible. Her desperation stemmed from poverty-driven struggles to care for her mother before her death—later revealed to be orchestrated by Teeki to manipulate her. After confronting this truth, Rio accepted responsibility and reformed. Now under house arrest with Biko, her flirtatious nature earned Muhyo's nickname "kissing fiend".
Sophie the Face Ripper (ソフィー, Sofī))
Voiced by: Yūko Gotō (Japanese); Kira Buckland (English)
Sophie is a formidable spirit originally confined to the Arcanum before Rio released her. During her lifetime, she was ostracized by her sister for her plain appearance, driving her to murder people and steal their faces. As a spirit, she possesses shapeshifting abilities to mimic others. Her power proves so immense that only a high-level magical commandment typically requiring four enforcers working together can subdue her. In her final moments, she tearfully questions why her sister never allowed her to attend parties as she fades away.
Reiko Imai (今井 玲子, Imai Reiko)
Voiced by: Mitsuki Saiga (Japanese); Lisa Ortiz (English)
Imai is a magical law judge assigned to guard the Arcanum prison. She narrowly survived Sophie's escape when the spirit deemed her face unworthy of stealing. After nearly being killed by Teeki during the incident, she befriends Roji and later escorts him to Magical Law School. Their relationship deepens, with hints that Imai may harbor romantic feelings for him.
Teeki the Fallen (ティキ, Tiki)
Voiced by: Tetsuharu Ōta (Japanese); Bill Rogers (English)
Teeki serves as Enchu's enigmatic lieutenant and a formidable adversary marked by the Magical Law Association for centuries. His true nature remains ambiguous—possibly a spirit or an immortal practitioner of forbidden magic. Responsible for orchestrating the Arcanum fire, he displays a sadistic nature, reveling in destruction and attempting to eliminate Muhyo's group. Teeki introduced Enchu to forbidden magical law and is distinguished by his four-eyed mask and marked gloves.
Page Klaus (ペイジ・クラウス, Peiji Kurausu)
Voiced by: Wataru Hatano (Japanese); Keith Silverstein (English)
Page is a renowned magical law instructor who trained both Muhyo and Enchu. Emphasizing physical fitness as foundational to magical practice, he balances his stern teachings with poetic pursuits and paternal care for his students—exemplified when he rushed to Muhyo's side despite the latter's injuries. Unbeknownst to Roji, Page previously exorcised a spirit from Roji's childhood friend, gifting him the tie that later connected him to Muhyo, an encounter Page describes as fate.
Daranimaru Goryo (五嶺 陀羅尼丸, Goryō Daranimaru) / Goryo (ゴリョー, Goryō)
Voiced by: Yūsuke Kobayashi (Japanese); Johnny Yong Bosch (English)
Goryo is a corrupt magical law enforcer who leads the centuries-old Goryo Group Syndicate. Though magically weak, the syndicate compensates through ruthless tactics—extortion, bribery, and murder. Goryo extorts clients by threatening to release captured spirits, abuses his assistants, and obsesses over wealth and family status. After the syndicate's destruction by Ark and his rescue from Tomas, he undergoes genuine redemption.
Hanao Ebisu (恵比寿 花夫) / Ebisu (エビス)
Voiced by: Shinya Takahashi (Japanese); Ed Bosco (English)
Ebisu is a magical law judge who served as Goryo's assistant, distinguished by his clown-like appearance and fear of his employer's temper. Resentful of Roji's rapid rise under Muhyo, Ebisu aided Goryo in spirit banishments and syndicate operations until being fired for strategic failures. Despite this dismissal, he remained loyal, rushing to Goryo's defense when the syndicate was attacked.
Tomas (トーマス, Tōmasu)
Voiced by: Ikuya Sawaki (Japanese); Christopher Corey Smith (English)
Tomas is a criminal practitioner allied with Ark. Posing as a teacher and Page's friend, his fraudulent credentials and criminal past were later exposed. Partnered with Beelzebub, he obsessively collects objects ranging from mundane items like teacups to human souls.
Chiyo Sakurai (桜井 千代, Sakurai Chiyo) / Panza (パンジャ, Panja)
Panza, a spirit assassin in Ark's group, obsessively pursued Roji after his kindness during her outcast childhood. Corrupted by Teeki, she attacked Muhyo before dying tragically. Her final moments with Roji—where he wished for friendship but she clung to her knight fantasy—inspired the group's resolve against Ark.
Michael Cortlaw (マイケル・コルトロウ, Maikeru Korutorou) / Mick (ミック, Miku)
Mick, known as "the Slasher," was an unpredictable Ark operative who followed orders in his own unconventional way. A simple-minded warrior who lived for battle, his relaxed demeanor gave way to eccentric combat techniques—morphing his entire body into a sword. Orphaned when the Magical Law Association executed his practitioner parents for attacking envoys, he sought only his next fight.
Ivy Cortlaw (アイビー・コルトロウ, Aibi Korutorou)
Ark's spirit master sought vengeance against the Magical Law Association for her parents' deaths. Her attempted destruction of the organization was thwarted by Goryo, leading to her murder by fellow Ark member Buhpu.

== Media ==
=== Manga ===
Written by Yoshiyuki Nishi, Muhyo and Roji's Bureau of Supernatural Investigation was serialized in Shueisha's shōnen manga magazine Weekly Shōnen Jump from November 29, 2004, to March 3, 2008. Shueisha collected its 156 individual chapters in eighteen tankōbon volumes, released from May 2, 2005, to June 4, 2008.

The series has been licensed for English–language release in North America by Viz Media, which released the first volume of the series in October 2007 under its "Shonen Jump" manga line. As of August 2010, the company has published all eighteen volumes of the series.

A sequel series, titled Muhyo to Roji no Mahōritsu Sōdan Jimusho: Mazoku Magushi-hen (ムヒョとロージーの魔法律相談事務所 魔属魔具師編; "Muhyo & Roji's Bureau of Supernatural Investigation: Magical Genus Magic Tool Master Chapter") was serialized in Shōnen Jump+ app from March 19, 2018, to March 7, 2019. Shueisha released two tankōbon volumes on August 3, 2018, and April 4, 2019.

=== Anime ===
A 12-episode anime television series produced by Studio Deen aired from August 3 to October 19, 2018, on SKY PerfecTV! and Animax. Nobuhiro Kondo directed the series, while scripts were handled by Yasuyuki Suzuki, music composed by Ryo Kawasaki, characters designed by Kouichiro Kawano, and Kazuko Tadano and Hiromi Matsushita serving as chief animation directors. The opening theme song is "Gifted", performed by Screen Mode, while the ending theme song is "Hotohashiru", performed by Oresama. The series has been streamed on Crunchyroll.

On June 16, 2019, a second season was announced, with the staff and cast reprising their roles. It aired from July 7 to September 22, 2020.

==== Episodes ====
===== Season 1 (2018) =====
No.	Title (Note: All English episode titles taken from Crunchyroll.)	Original release date
1	"Rie and Taeko"; Transliteration: "Rie to Taeko" (Japanese: リエとタエコ)	August 3, 2018
Rie Inoue, a high school student, encounters magical law enforcer Toru Muhyo and his assistant Jiro "Roji" Kusano from the Muhyo Bureau of Supernatural Investigation. After witnessing Muhyo execute a spirit for unsolicited animal parasitism, Rie recounts the haunting at Hashiki Station's fifth track by Taeko Okazaki, her former friend. Their friendship fractured when Rie focused on volleyball, culminating in Taeko's accidental death after a confrontation on the tracks. In the present, Rie revisits the station at night while Muhyo and Roji observe. Thick ectoplasm manifests as Taeko's ghost appears in a monstrous form, tormenting Rie. Muhyo prepares to sentence Taeko to Hades's Banquet for unsolicited object spectralization. Though Rie pleads for leniency, Muhyo instead sends Taeko to the River Styx for purification. Two days later, Rie submits a letter of thanks, though agency policy prohibits post-mission contact.
2	"Kenji and Nana"; Transliteration: "Kenji to Nana" (Japanese: ケンジとナナ)	August 10, 2018
Kenji Satō, a skeptical teenager, vandalizes Muhyo and Roji's office sign before ignoring their warnings to investigate a sealed shrine. Accompanied by friends Fumie and Yoshio, Kenji tears the shrine's seal, unleashing a bloodthirsty spirit. Muhyo intervenes with Silver Armor, a protective aura, and sentences the spirit to Imprisonment in Hell's Cell for mass vampirism. Grateful, Kenji gifts the pair a baseball. Kenji later introduces photographer Nana Takenouchi, whose images inexplicably capture supernatural phenomena. Muhyo suspects her medium abilities, prompting Nana to flee. Kenji explains her strained relationship with her late father, a disgraced ghost photographer whose spirit now haunts her. When the spirit manifests, Muhyo sentences it to Crossing the Styx for unsolicited posterior appearance.
3	"Talent"; Transliteration: "Sainō" (Japanese: 才能)	August 17, 2018
Aya Shiratori, a skilled pianist, seeks help when her piano exhibits supernatural activity. Muhyo and Roji explain that intense human emotions emit spiritual energy, attracting a shadowy spirit that has played her piano nightly for three years. After a ten-day stakeout inside vases, they confront the spirit at 3 a.m. Aya counters its attack by playing piano, enabling Muhyo to sentence it to Beelzebub's Treasure Chest for unsolicited mass energy emission. Following the case, Roji receives a magic-sealing pen and exam invitation from the Magical Law Association, despite Muhyo's reservations. When Nana arrives with photographic evidence of a bridge ghost, Muhyo initially refuses involvement. Roji investigates alone, but the ghost captures Nana until Muhyo intervenes. He instructs Roji to use talisman techniques with the new pen, then sentences the spirit to The Devil's Hammer for attempted murder. Though uncertain about the exam, Roji proceeds after Muhyo opens a magic circle portal to Association headquarters—an act secretly observed by Nana.
4	"Omen"; Transliteration: "Zenchō" (Japanese: 前兆)	August 24, 2018
Nana unexpectedly follows Muhyo and Roji through the magic circle, arriving at the Magical Law Association headquarters in Azumino's mountains. Her encounter with judge Yoichi Himukai proves unsettling due to his overt advances. Meanwhile, Muhyo and Yoichi investigate the murders of enforcers Elena Lily and Sosei Okouchi, suspecting their rogue classmate Soratsugu "Enchu" Madoka hides in the Shin'etsu region. During Roji's promotion exam, Nana screams upon discovering grotesque mouths manifesting on Yoichi's body. Muhyo reveals Yoichi carries a contagious spirit infection, which spreads when Nana touches Roji, triggering mass panic. Though Muhyo attempts to purge the infection using a spirit striker, Enchu's malevolent spirit consumes the weapon, forcing exam cancellation. Yoichi later consoles Roji at a restaurant, recounting their shared past with Enchu as inseparable classmates. The conversation underscores the tragedy of Enchu's betrayal while contextualizing the group's unresolved bonds.
5	"Insanity"; Transliteration: "Kyōki" (Japanese: 狂気)	August 31, 2018
Nana discovers and delivers a torn picture of Muhyo in the headquarters tower, prompting reflections on their past. As classmates, Enchu was diligent, Yoichi carefree, and Muhyo naturally gifted. Enchu's descent into madness began after missing his dying mother and witnessing Muhyo's promotion. In the present, Enchu unleashes vengeful spirits across the headquarters, confronting Muhyo and Nana directly. At a restaurant, Roji and Yoichi endure the spirits' screams until Yoichi eradicates them with binding magic, reassuring Roji of his worth as Muhyo's chosen assistant. Meanwhile, Muhyo protects Nana with Silver Armor as spirits collapse their tower room. Roji arrives, deploying binding magic to purge the area. Muhyo sentences the remaining spirits to Hell Train for attempted mass murder and unsolicited parasitism. Anticipating further attacks, he insists Roji remain near him. Yoichi later jests by presenting Roji with a provisional first-class secretary license.
6	"The Butterfly of the Night"; Transliteration: "Yoru no Chō" (Japanese: 夜の蝶)	September 7, 2018
Muhyo, Roji, and Nana encounter romance novelist Abeyuki Yontani at Nanagase Hot Springs, where he suspects ghostly influence during his six-month writing streak. That night, Roji's talisman exposes Zansetsu Hirata, a Meiji era author who wrote while battling tuberculosis. Hirata's spirit, having loved a tubercular woman named Yuri, possessed generations of writers to continue his novel. In the bathhouse, Muhyo's exorcism attempt triggers Hirata's monstrous transformation, though he takes Nana hostage without malice. Yontani discovers Nana nearly completed Hirata's novel, realizing the spirit saw him as a true successor despite his self-doubt. Muhyo sentences Hirata to Owl of No Return for prolonged unsolicited residence and facial transcription. The next day, Nana witnesses Yontani's interview, where he declares the novel's theme as "the joy of being alive"—a legacy bridging Hirata's tragedy and Yontani's redemption.
7	"Magic Prison"; Transliteration: "Ma-Kangoku" (Japanese: 魔監獄)	September 14, 2018
Yū "Biko" Abiko arrives unexpectedly via magic circle, seeking Muhyo and Roji's aid at a magic prison where her talismans failed to contain an escaped spirit. Traveling to a Pacific island, they meet Biko's mentor Rio Kurotori and learn from jailers Iwamoto, Maeda, and Furuya that judge Reiko Imai sacrificed herself to seal the prison after her assistant's death. The group descends to the lower levels, where Rio identifies the threat as Sophie the Face Ripper, a 500-year-old European spirit imprisoned two decades prior. They first confront Red-Eye, an eye-collecting spirit subdued by Roji using combined talismans from Biko and Rio. Their progress is interrupted by the Rain Dog, a conglomerate of abandoned dog spirits that infects Biko's leg with a spiritual virus.
8	"Becoming Someone Else"; Transliteration: "Narikawari" (Japanese: なりかわり)	September 21, 2018
Muhyo protects the group from the Rain Dog with Silver Armor while Rio administers a curative potion to Biko. After Roji fails to bind the spirit, Muhyo sentences it to Hands of 100 Demon Princes for contamination and attempted murder. Descending further, they discover Fujiwara's faceless corpse, which transforms into a winged spirit—prompting Muhyo to condemn it to The Devil's Lance for unauthorized transformation. Meanwhile, Yoichi uncovers a tampered talisman sent to Biko's office. The group reaches Sophie's empty cell, designed as a child's bedroom, and theorizes she may have shapeshifted into jailers Iwamoto, Maeda, or Furuya (the first two later revealed to be engaged). Overnight, they debate Sophie's possible disguise. Roji learns from Rio how she once shielded a rebellious Biko during their school days. The jailers later find Imai in the shower room, suspecting her to be Sophie. Unbeknownst to them, Enchu orchestrated the tampered talisman's delivery, gleefully informing Teeki the Fallen that Sophie will slaughter everyone on the island.
9	"Sophie"; Transliteration: "Sofī" (Japanese: ソフィー)	September 28, 2018
Biko discovers a bloodied faceless corpse while Rio searches for Iwamoto and Furuya. Roji and Maeda learn Sophie spared Imai due to her bob cut. Biko and Rio deduce Furuya is Sophie, but fail to prevent Iwamoto's death. Fleeing Sophie's pursuit, they regroup with Roji and Imai, who attempt to rouse Muhyo. As Sophie corners Biko and Rio in the locker room, Rio shields Biko just as Muhyo arrives. Imai seals Sophie temporarily with a talisman while Muhyo prepares an advanced exorcism. When Sophie breaks free, Roji stalls her with Biko's talisman, enabling Muhyo to sentence her to Hell's Marshal for identity theft. Sophie retaliates with telekinetic glass shards, but Rio unexpectedly conjures a physical barrier—a spell beyond her known abilities. A flashback reveals Sophie murdered her sister after being excluded from a party. With Fujiwara, Iwamoto, and Furuya avenged, Roji confronts Rio about her uncharacteristic magical prowess.
10	"Raspberries"; Transliteration: "Ki Ichigo" (Japanese: 木イチゴ)	October 5, 2018
Roji observes scars on Rio's face as Imai detects Muhyo's critical ren depletion. Meanwhile, Enchu dismisses Sophie's failure. Rio attacks with a wand, forcing Imai to recognize her forbidden contract—trading her soul for power, which will corrupt her into a spirit. Rio admits she freed Sophie to weaken Muhyo, miscalculating Roji's resilience and Imai's survival. While Imai stays behind, Yoichi rescues the group from Rio, fleeing to the forest. He exposes Rio's alliance with Enchu, evidenced by her journal found in her burned office. The entries reveal Rio's past: two years prior, she mentored Biko while being ostracized by colleagues Sosei and Elena. Her mother's death by a spirit drove her to Enchu's faction. Confronted in the forest, Rio coldly dismisses Biko's nostalgic mention of raspberry-picking, confirming she had already turned traitor by then—consumed by grief. Biko laments their missed chance at reconciliation.
11	"The Gamble"; Transliteration: "Kake" (Japanese: 賭け)	October 12, 2018
Rio summons a flame salamander, overwhelming the group until Yoichi erects a six-direction barrier. Biko prepares ren Source Spring—a potion Rio once taught her—to restore Muhyo's ren, despite its lethal risks if overused. After drinking it entirely, Muhyo counterattacks with Anesthetic Needles, knocking Rio unconscious and dispelling her salamander. Yoichi prepares a messenger gate to nullify Rio's contract, but Enchu appears beside her. Meanwhile, Maeda reports seeing a laughing figure open the prison gates, implicating Enchu in Sosei and Elena's murders. Muhyo exploits a blind spot to strike Enchu with needles, but they fail—Enchu has sacrificed his humanity. Teeki then merges the prison's spirits, funneling them to Enchu.
12	"Swallows in the Wind"; Transliteration: "~Fū no Naka no Tsubame~" (Japanese: ～風の中のツバメ～)	October 19, 2018
Muhyo sentences the fused spirits to Demon-faced Cannonball for unsolicited spectral fusion, while Roji's barrier shields them from the backlash. Muhyo collapses, coughing blood—a toxic side effect of ren Source Spring. Teeki escapes the prison before Imai seals it, rejoining Enchu, who spares the group to tend to Rio while vowing their eventual hunt by other forbidden magic users. At Magical Law Hospital, ren bells purify Muhyo's exhaustion. Page Klaus visits, warning of an organized hit list among forbidden magic practitioners—including Teeki, the four-eyed-masked traitor marked for 800 years. The Association mobilizes against the threat. That night, Roji sneaks into Muhyo's room, resolved to strengthen his abilities. Days later, as Muhyo prepares for discharge, Yoichi contacts Nana, revealing she and Kenji have been staying at the duo's office.

===== Season 2 (2020) =====
No. overall	No. in season	Title (Note: All English episode titles taken from Funimation.)	Original release date
13	1	"Enter Goryo"; Transliteration: "Goryō Tōjō" (Japanese: 五嶺登場)	July 7, 2020
During a covert meeting with Enchu and Teeki, Rio Kurotori collapses from spectralization after acquiring a counterfeit Forbidden Text. Meanwhile, Nana interrupts schoolgirls Yumi and Rika attempting Kokkuri spirit contact, unaware the spirit intends harm. At their office, Toru Muhyo and Jiro "Roji" Kusano discuss the recent magic prison incident with Nana, who reveals the schoolgirls' dangerous spirit encounter. Kokkuri later attacks Yumi in her apartment, leaving her near death until Daranimaru Goryo and Hanao Ebisu of the Goryo Bureau of Supernatural Investigation intervene, restoring Yumi and disparaging Roji's competence. Kokkuri then targets Rika but falls into Goryo's traps, earning sentencing to the Cavern of Roaring Tigers for attempted assault. Goryo boasts of his ninety-nine offices and extortion tactics before challenging Muhyo's agency to a winner-takes-all commission for Akagawa Estates.
14	2	"The Ruins of Akagawa Estates"; Transliteration: "Akagawa Danchi Ato" (Japanese: 赤川団地跡)	July 14, 2020
During Rio's painful purification with rock salt, Enchu remains convinced of her resilience. Meanwhile, Goryo and Ebisu depart in their limousine, vowing to honor the challenge's outcome. Muhyo reveals Goryo's century-old Onmyōdō lineage, noting his family's history of unethical practices. At Akagawa Estates, Ebisu explains the abandoned demolition project—haunted for twenty years—now offers 30 million yen for exorcism. Muhyo shields Nana with Silver Curtain, rendering her invisible to spirits. While Goryo's team works externally, Muhyo and Roji confront a foggy face spirit indoors, sentencing it to Hell's Impalement before round doll spirits emerge. Roji's barrier disperses them temporarily. The dolls' origin traces to Ai, a girl who died tragically, prompting her mother to craft haunted dolls. On the rooftop, Muhyo condemns the spirits to Hell's Picture Book for obstruction and parasitism, but they multiply through mitotic replication. Goryo breaches Nana's barrier, forcing her to flee until she collapses upon hearing a mysterious voice. Ebisu attempts to drain her ren but retreats from doll spirits, allowing Muhyo and Roji to rescue her.
15	3	"Win or Lose"; Transliteration: "Shōhai" (Japanese: 勝敗)	July 21, 2020
While Roji tends to Nana, Muhyo provokes Ebisu by insulting Goryo. Ebisu activates an incomplete spirit magnetic attraction circle to trap the doll spirits, allowing Goryo to exit the Silver Curtain. Nana again hears the mysterious voice, which Roji identifies as Ai's mother's spirit. Muhyo proposes Nana contact Ai's spirit to pacify her mother. Goryo sentences the dolls to Thunder Hell Boy for long-term haunting and murder, but they break free. Muhyo summons Yuuri, a Hell sage who overpowers Goryo's judgment. Using a makeshift summoning board, Nana connects with Ai's spirit, drawing out her mother. Their reunion allows Yuuri to guide both to the River Styx. Roji disputes Muhyo's concession of victory to Goryo, but Muhyo explains his interference prioritized the spirits' redemption—not the challenge. When Roji doubts his worth, Muhyo grants him an indefinite break for self-reflection, which Goryo interprets as dismissal.
16	4	"Encounter"; Transliteration: "Deai" (Japanese: 出会い)	July 28, 2020
Goryo seizes Muhyo's office and dismisses Ebisu for incompetence. With Roji on indefinite leave, Muhyo partners with Yoichi and Biko to rescue Rio. Roji travels to the Magic Law Academy with Imai, reflecting on his past interview: two years prior, he alone subdued a snake spirit attacking a judge, earning Muhyo's scorn for other applicants but securing his position as assistant despite initially failing the exam. In the present, Imai challenges Roji to discern why Muhyo chose him. Meanwhile, Enchu celebrates Rio's recovery, while Muhyo, Yoichi, and Biko strategize for an undisclosed mission.
17	5	"The Testing Begins"; Transliteration: "Kentei Kaishi" (Japanese: 検定開始)	August 4, 2020
Yoichi presents Muhyo and Biko with a photo showing Rio fully recovered beside a fading Enchu. In New York, Enchu and Panza enter a bookstore where Teeki assaults the owner while Enchu interrogates the clerk about a "genuine article". Meanwhile, Roji stays with Imai, finding a pamphlet for a magic law exam—later revealed as Muhyo and Imai's ploy. At the Magic Law Academy, Roji and Imai encounter twins Lili Mathias and Maril Mathias, who mistake them for a couple. The group spots the recently fired Ebisu before entering the exam. Page Klaus oversees the event, directing examinees to undergo a physical examination with medical devices that measure magical potential. Roji, Ebisu, and the twins are escorted to a pastry-filled food court, where Page announces their selection for a magical law retreat. Concurrently, Muhyo, Yoichi, and Biko complete a project opening a messenger gate to Hell, with Biko rescuing Yoichi from its pull. That night, Roji loses repeatedly to Lili and Maril in cards before facing a three-eyed spider spirit—part of Page's covert survival training.
18	6	"Their Respective Trials"; Transliteration: "Sorezore no Shiren" (Japanese: それぞれの試練)	August 11, 2020
Trapped in lockdown, Roji, Lili, and Maril shelter with Ebisu, who reveals the twins are researcher-doctors with second-class secretary ranks. They ally against the spider spirits—Roji using exorcism arts, Ebisu casting binding spells—but a second spirit ambushes them. Meanwhile, Muhyo summons Yuuri to challenge Hades Ruararie, though the demon gains advantage with Thousand Tongues. Page and warden Emily monitor the dormitory, where subdued spirits are reported. The crisis escalates as two ghasts appear: one spewing acid, the other releasing Bellocent of Mist Mountain, an unapproved entity. Imai warns the group as Bellocent triggers a short circuit, plunging the dorm into darkness. She exposes the retreat's true purpose: warfare training against forbidden magic. Ebisu details Bellocent's proboscis-based mind control, just as it locates them. Page orders external intervention upon learning Bellocent escaped via telekinesis. While Hades Ruararie nears victory, Muhyo prepares to unlock Yuuri's full power.
19	7	"Trust"; Transliteration: "Shinrai" (Japanese: 信頼)	August 18, 2020
Imai's exorcism circle of six hands fails against Bellocent, forcing Roji's group to retreat. As Muhyo activates Yuuri's true form against Hades Ruararie, the demon counters by transforming, prompting Yoichi to summon a seemingly ineffective fairy via Biko's minion jar. In the dormitory, Maril's arm is poisoned by Bellocent's proboscis. After Imai's decoy tactic, Bellocent vanishes before Roji can complete a binding spell. Ebisu then performs a forbidden ren injection—a Goryo family technique—transferring his remaining energy to Roji before collapsing, affirming Muhyo's desire for a true partner. Roji attempts to inscribe a spell on Bellocent but falters under its oppressive aura. Meanwhile, Page struggles to extract the trapped examinees, and Teeki secures the genuine Forbidden Text elsewhere.
20	8	"Conclusion"; Transliteration: "Kecchaku" (Japanese: 決着)	August 25, 2020
Roji completes the binding spell on Bellocent, trapping her in a barrier. Simultaneously, Muhyo revives Yuuri to deflect Hades Ruararie's Duato's Spear, compelling the demon to finalize their contract with Kiriko as mediator. Page's team breaches the dormitory, where he sentences Bellocent and the ghasts to The Magebow for jailbreaking and assault. Days later, Roji begins an executive office internship but declines Page's investigator offer, prioritizing his partnership with Muhyo. Page confirms Roji passed the test by demonstrating unwavering resolve and compassion. Reunited with Muhyo, Yoichi, and Biko, Roji is reinstated as partner, with plans to reclaim their office. Meanwhile, Enchu's faction gathers, entrusting Rio with the genuine Forbidden Text. At Imai's residence, Yoichi introduces Nana as Page's new part-time investigator. During a celebratory gathering, Kenji contacts the group, demanding their return to the old office—prompting Muhyo to quip about their impending group date with trouble.
21	9	"Under the Sod"; Transliteration: "Kusaba no Kage" (Japanese: 草葉の影)	September 1, 2020
Kenji alerts Muhyo, Roji, and Nana about a ghost in their old office. Though initial checks reveal no spirit activity, Kenji's poorly played recorder draws out a lingering spirit—a young woman with red eyes who locks Roji and Kenji inside a room. After Muhyo subdues her with Mottled Shadow's Keeper for unsolicited transformation, Kenji learns the spirit is Kyoko, who died protecting her brother Manabu in a fire. Her spirit departs peacefully after Kenji plays the recorder properly at her grave. Meanwhile, the Goryo Group Syndicate locates Ark's hideout. At an Ark meeting, Rio presents the sealed Forbidden Text to Tomas, noting it requires a key. Later, while Muhyo's group gathers at Imai's house, Ebisu announces his return to Goryo. Yoichi receives news of an attack on Goryo's main temple—confirmed when Goryo's headquarters is burned by Ark. Tomas, clad in black, confronts Goryo.
22	10	"Worms"; Transliteration: "Mushi" (Japanese: 蟲)	September 8, 2020
Goryo exits his car, ordering Sakon to regroup with Ebisu before sentencing Tomas to Ropes of Avici for unauthorized lingering. Tomas—revealed as Goryo's former teacher—captures him, dismissing the judgment as amateurish. At the burning syndicate headquarters, Teeki's spirits prevent firefighters from extinguishing the flames. Muhyo's group joins Nana and Yoichi at the Magical Law Association, learning of Goryo's abduction. They proceed to Tomas's hideout, where police officers are attacked by artificial constructs. Inside, Goryo is found spectralizing from worms of unmaking. The team splits: Yoichi binds constructs while Ebisu barges into Goryo's chamber. Exorcism pills fail, and Tomas remotely mutates Goryo further. Ebisu is impaled by Goryo's new limbs while blocking Sakon's wakizashi strike. Tomas gloats about orchestrating Goryo and Ebisu's friendship. Roji's furious talisman assault is nearly deflected until Tomas dissipates the last one. Yoichi deduces killing Tomas is key, while Kiriko communicates with Nana.
23	11	"Beelzebub's Armor"; Transliteration: "Hae-ō no Yoroi" (Japanese: 蠅王の鎧)	September 15, 2020
Nana disrupts Tomas with a flash, enabling Kiriko to purge the worms of unmaking from Goryo. Ebisu destroys one escaping worm with a talisman. At the Magic Law Association, Imai observes will-o'-the-wisp over the Goryo Estate and learns Teeki stole the Forbidden Text. Page admits the Association plans to frame Tomas, revealing their corruption. A flashback shows Page and Tomas as colleagues collecting insects, before Page discovered Tomas' criminal past. Presently, Tomas—revealed as half-ghast—evades Muhyo's sentence (Beelzebub's Treasure Chest) by invoking Beelzebub's Armor, becoming immune to police gunfire. As officers evacuate Goryo and Ebisu, Tomas pursues Muhyo's group, absorbing all attacks and transforming into his ultimate form. Roji's exorcism and Muhyo's spirit strikers fail to stop him. Declaring Enchu's enemies must perish, Tomas attacks.
24	12	"That Which is Perfect"; Transliteration: "Kanzen'naru Mono" (Japanese: 完全なるもの)	September 22, 2020
The last spirit striker severs Tomas, but he retaliates with Styxsand—a vortex to the underworld. Muhyo directs Roji to dive in and destroy Tomas's book of magical law, which Roji accomplishes by emerging through Tomas's back. Dark crows, harbingers of doom, encircle Tomas as Yoichi shields Muhyo with a barrier. Defiant even in defeat, Tomas refuses to reveal Enchu's location before Muhyo sentences him to Hades's Judgment for obstruction, attempted murder, and forgery. Page and Goryo receive news of Tomas's downfall, while Sakon reports Ebisu's recovery. Biko fails fifty attempts to craft a new magical law book. Elsewhere, Teeki supervises Rio unsealing the Forbidden Text, as Enchu fixates on Roji. Goryo permits Muhyo and Roji to reclaim their office, while Yoichi, Nana, and Kiriko remain part-time investigators. The story concludes with Roji welcoming an elderly client, signaling a return to normalcy—albeit with looming threats.

== Reception ==
For the week of June 5–11, the 12th volume of the premiered in seventh place in the list of weekly bestselling manga series in Japan. In Jason Thompson's online appendix to Manga: The Complete Guide, he describes the early volumes as having a "haunt of the week flavor", and describes the manga overall as maintaining a "quirky and sometimes creepy" tone, despite the plot becoming "conventionally melodramatic".
