= Yu-Gi-Oh! Zexal season 2 =

Yu-Gi-Oh! Zexal
- Season 2
- No. of episodes: 24

Release
- Original network: TV Tokyo
- Original release: October 10, 2011 – March 26, 2012

Season chronology
- ← Previous; Season 1 Next → Season 3

Yu-Gi-Oh! Zexal (遊☆戯☆王 ZEXAL (ゼアル), Yūgiō Zearu) is the third spin-off anime series in the Yu-Gi-Oh! franchise and the sixth anime series overall. It is by Nihon Ad Systems and broadcast on TV Tokyo. It is directed by Satoshi Kuwahara and animated by Studio Gallop. The series aired in Japan on TV Tokyo between April 11, 2011, and September 24, 2012. A second series, Yu-Gi-Oh! Zexal II, began airing from October 7, 2012. The show also premiered on Toonzai in North America on October 15, 2011. It is the first Yu-Gi-Oh! series to be broadcast in high-definition in United States. The story follows the young duelist Yuma Tsukumo who partners up with an ethereal spirit named Astral, as they search for the 100 Number Duel Monsters cards, which will restore Astral's memories.

Six pieces of theme music are used for the series: three opening and three ending themes. For episodes 1–25, the opening theme is "Masterpiece" (マスターピース, Masutāpīsu) by mihimaru GT while the ending theme is "My Quest" (僕クエスト, Boku Kuesuto) by Golden Bomber. For episode 26–49, the opening theme is "Braving!" (ブレイビング!, Bureibingu!) by Kanan while the ending theme is "Freesia of Longing" (切望のフリージア, Setsubō no Furījia) by DaizyStripper. For episodes 50–73, the opening theme is "Soul Drive" (魂ドライブ, Tamashī Doraibu) by Color Bottle while the ending theme is "Wild Child" (ワイルドチャイルド, Wairudo Chairudo) by Moumoon. For the 4Kids and Konami English dub versions, the opening theme is "Take a Chance" for all episodes.

== Episode list ==
No. overall	No. in season	English dub title / Japanese translated title	Written by	Original release date	American air date
26	1	"Let the Duels Begin" / "Begin! World Duel Carnival!"; Transliteration: "Kaimaku! Wārudo Dueru Kānibaru" (Japanese: 開幕！WDC)	Shin Yoshida	October 10, 2011	August 25, 2012
The World Duel Carnival, where Duelists from around the world will wage heated battles, is swiftly approaching. Yuma, after not getting a heart piece in the mail, tells his friends about it, and Caswell asks Yuma if he signed up. He tried, but it turned out the sign-ups had closed. Yuma freaks out, and Shark nearly runs him over as he ran out of the school. He bid farewell to Yuma, and notices a strange man in a building. Shark goes up there, to find it was Quattro, his opponent from the round Shark was disqualified. Quatttro points out that being afraid of losing wasn't the only reason he cheat, also because he had promised his sister in the hospital that he would win. Quattro also gives Shark Mirror Force, and said he set Shark up, knowing that he was desperate. When he left, Shark threw Mirror Force onto the road and left it there. Meanwhile, Mr. Heartland and Kite make their preparations to gather the Numbers that are likely to be assembled before them in this tournament. Yuma goes to Heartland City with his friends, and he begged the guards to be let into the World Duel Carnival (WDC) for several hours, before Kite found out, recognized him, and told Mr. Heartland to include him in the WDC, denying any knowledge of Yuma.
27	2	"A Team Performance" / "WDC Kickoff! The Flame Striker, Striker"; Transliteration: "Wārudo Dueru Kānibaru Kikku Ofu! Honō no Sutoraikā Kunitachi Kakeru" (Japanese: WDCキックオフ！炎のストライカー・国立カケル)	Tsutomu Kamishiro	October 17, 2011	September 1, 2012
Yuma's first opponent in the WDC is the soccer kid, Striker. Striker transforms the surrounding with his Field Spell Card "Stadium of Dreams", as the Duel kicks off. With his "Offside Trap", Striker brilliantly seals Yuma's strategies, while his teammate monsters use teamwork to frantically keep beating Yuma up with a combo of offense and defense and with such sheer strength, it seems as if Striker's victory is all but decided. Then, Caswell finally recognized Striker after his brothers are seen watching him duel, and he said that he used to like soccer, but teamwork kept messing him up, so he quit, saying he was over with soccer. Yuma said he definitely wasn't over with it, his cards said so. After Yuma beat Striker, his brothers said that he could be on the team again, which he happily accepted. Striker thanked Yuma for helping him realize the values of teamwork.
28	3	"Heavy Metal" / "Construction Site Duel! Destroy the Construction Equipment Deck!!"; Transliteration: "Kōjigenba Dueru! Jūki Dekki wo Uchiyabure!!" (Japanese: 工事現場デュエル！ 重機デッキを打ち破れ！！)	Toshimitsu Takeuchi	October 24, 2011	September 8, 2012
Whilst at a construction site looking for more opponents, Yuma and Tori are nearly run over by a bulldozer by Cody Callum, who Yuma mistakes for a kindergartener due to his height. Cody challenges Yuma to a duel after finding out that they both were in the duel carnival with his Heavy Industry Deck. Cody tells Yuma that he loves machines because of how giant they are, because he was picked on for his small size, and that all big ones have more power. As the noise from Cody's ace monster, Digvorzhak, King of Heavy Industry makes it hard for Yuma to hear Astral's instructions, so Astral speaks to Yuma telepathically. Learning how even a tiny bolt helps keep aloft mighty machinery, Yuma manages to use his low level monster to take down Digvorzhak and win the duel. Yuma points out machines are held together by small parts, and Cody says he'll remember that. One of the workers catches them there and shoos them off the construction site before Cody's dad, who worked there, found out.
29	4	"Love Hurts" / "Railroad Deck Takeoff! Runaway Duelist Anna"; Transliteration: "Tetsubō Dekki Hasshin! Bakusō Duerisuto Anna" (Japanese: 鉄道デッキ発進！暴走決闘者アンナ)	Yoshifumi Fukushima	October 31, 2011	September 15, 2012
Yuma and Tori find themselves being chased by Anna Kaboom, a girl who allegedly pranked Yuma in her childhood because she had a crush on him. After a lengthy chase involving a rocket launcher, Yuma challenges Anna to a duel, who declares that if she wins, he will be hers. Anna proves to be trouble with her Railway Deck, especially when she summons a Rank 10 Xyz Monster, Super Dreadnought Rail Cannon Gustav Max. Anna said that Yuma was afraid of heights, and he said he was never, causing Tori to think that something was going on. Yuma summons his new Xyz Monster, Temtempo the Percussion Djinn, and manages to use his traps to turn Anna's overwhelming firepower against her and win. After the duel, he told Anna she was wasting too much power on things that could be handled with small ones. It is revealed by Tori that Anna had confused Yuma for someone else. Embarrassed, she rode away.
30	5	"No Tomato" / "Yuma's Greatest Ordeal! Fight to Death, Vegetable Death Match"; Transliteration: "Yūma Saidai no Shiren! Shidō, Yassai Desumacchi" (Japanese: 遊馬最大の試練！ 死闘、野菜デスマッチ)	Kenichi Yamashita	November 7, 2011	September 22, 2012
Yuma encounters Tombo Tillbitty, a tomato-addicted farmer who wants Tori to become an image girl for his dream place that he wanted to open, Tomatotopia. Yuma challenges him to a duel, which Tombo makes into a 'Vegetable Death Match', in which players have to eat a vegetable whenever they attack. This proves to be a tricky rule for Yuma as he hates tomatoes, especially since most of the vegetables in Yuma's barrel are tomatoes or tomato hybrids, leaving many opportunities to attack pass by. After some pushing from Tori, Yuma finally gives in and eats a tomato-carrot hybrid, coming to like it, and wins the duel with his Xyz Monster, Melomelody the Brass Djinn. He thanks Tombo for helping Yuma start to like tomatoes.
31	6	"Life Is a Carnival: Part 1" / "His Name is Charlie, the Man with the Strongest Luck in History"; Transliteration: "Sono Mei wa Chari! Shijo Saikyo no Un wo Motsu Otoko" (Japanese: その名はチャーリー！史上最強の運を持つ男)	Shin Yoshida	November 14, 2011	September 29, 2012
Kari is contacted by a thief named Charlie McCay, who used to be her father's assistant before he disappeared, and now was pursuing his own interests as a treasure hunter. She sends Yuma, who is accompanied by Tori, to meet up with him, for she was preparing him (Charlie) food on his request and couldn't go. Yuma and Tori encounters Shark along the way and hears his motivation for entering the WDC. As Yuma meets up with Charlie and tells him about his sister wanting to capture him (Charlie), he learns that Charlie possesses a Number card, Number 7: Lucky Straight, granting him extraordinary luck. As the police approach him, Charlie uses his Number card to create a whirlwind that takes several people's cards, including Utopia, and allows him to escape. After hearing about Charlie from Kari, Yuma manages to confront him on a runaway monorail and challenge him to a duel.
32	7	"Life Is a Carnival: Part 2" / "Invincible Luck! Number 7: Lucky Straight"; Transliteration: "Muteki no Kyōin! Numbāzu Nana Rakkī Sutoraipu" (Japanese: 無敵の強運！No.7 ラッキー・ストライプ)	Yasuyuki Suzuki	November 21, 2011	October 6, 2012
Charlie uses the luck granted to him by his Number card to increase his life points to high levels and summon out Lucky Straight. As the monorail runs out of time before it crashes, Kari informs Yuma that there is a phrase to go with Number 7, "As Long as the Sun that shines stay complete, I never have to fear defeat." Charlie summons "Sun Scale," and Yuma realizes what the phrase with the card means, destroys "Sun Scale," and neutralizes Lucky Straight's power, taking away Charlie's luck and allowing him to win the duel with Utopia Ray. As Kari helps to stop the monorail in time, Charlie goes to see his niece, May, who is due for a risky operation, and gives Lucky Straight to her for good luck before saying his farewells to Kari. Astral asks Yuma if they should have gone with Charlie to give the number card back. Astral keeps asking Yuma, but Yuma continually ignores him.
33	8	"Foolish Fans" / "Tag Duel of Hell! Fiendish Hero Quattro"; Transliteration: "Jigoku no Taggu Dueru! Akuma no Hīrō Fō" (Japanese: 地獄のタッグデュエル！悪魔のヒーローIV)	Shin Yoshida	November 28, 2011	October 13, 2012
As the second day of the WDC begins, Bronk and Caswell are invited by Quattro to participate in a Battle Royale for all their Heart Pieces. They go to an abandoned site with Yuma and Tori, and Quattro brought his younger brother, Trey, with him. Although he acts innocently enough, he soon reveals his true purpose is to gather Numbers and summons his ace monster, Number 15: Gimmick Puppet Giant Grinder, using its ability to use their Xyz Monsters against them and defeat them. Also, even after Bronk and Caswell lost all of their life points, he continued attacking them, causing Caswell to be knocked unconscious. Yuma challenges Quattro, Shark arrives on the scene, challenging Quattro.
34	9	"Shark Bait" / "The Determined Revenge, Tragic Duelist, Shark"; Transliteration: "Ketsui no Fukushū Kanashiki Dyuerisuto Shāku" (Japanese: 決意の復讐 哀しき決闘者シャーク)	Shin Yoshida	December 5, 2011	October 20, 2012
As Shark prepares to face Quattro, he is forced to duel Trey instead, whilst Quattro leaves with a completed Heart Pass. As Tori and Bronk take Caswell to the hospital, Yuma and Astral stay to observe Shark's duel. Trey activates a water field. Shark brings out Black Ray Lancer whilst Trey summons Number 32: Shark Drake which deals massive damage to him. As Shark takes control of Shark Drake, he is almost possessed by the Number's power, but overcomes it due to remembering Yuma's words. Trey then summons his ace monster, Chronomaly Crystal Chrononaut, but Shark sees through Trey's traps and wins the duel. It turned out that Vetrix wanted Shark to win to get a hold of Shark Drake, and that there was a seed of darkness implanted in his soul.
35	10	"Bad Developments: Part 1" / "The Shocking Scoop, Tori's Dangerous Future!"; Transliteration: "Shōgeki no Sukūpu! Kotori no Kiken-na Mirai!" (Japanese: 衝撃のスクープ！小鳥の危険な未来)	Tsutomu Kamishiro	December 12, 2011	October 27, 2012
Kari's boss Editor in chief sends her to investigate a cameraman named Cameron Clix who is allegedly able to take photos that predict future events. After witnessing this ability firsthand, Kari gets Yuma to search for Cameron. Meanwhile, Tori, who had gotten annoyed after Yuma snaps at her, encounters Cameron, who is an old friend of hers, and gets her photo taken before boarding the WDC blimp. Afterwards, Yuma witnesses Cameron defeating someone with a Numbers card. As Yuma and Kari confront Cameron, he shows a future photo of Tori in a dangerous situation aboard the blimp, just as one of its engines blows. As Kari rushes to save Tori and everyone else on the blimp, Yuma confronts Cameron in a duel, where Cameron takes a future photo allegedly foretelling Yuma's defeat on the 6th turn.
36	11	"Bad Developments: Part 2" / "The Power to Create the Future! Utopia Ray"; Transliteration: "Mirai wo Kiri Hiraku Chikara! Kibō Hōpu Rei" (Japanese: 未来を切り開く力！希望皇ホープレイ)	Tsutomu Kamishiro	December 19, 2011	November 3, 2012
As Yuma struggles to fight against Cameron who can predict his moves, the second engine on the blimp blows, further endangering Tori, who is shocked to hear about Cameron's change in personality. Cameron said that people thought his photos were boring before he found the number card in a garden while taking photos, which made them more exciting, because he used them to cause disasters. Yuma decides to make his own future and rejects the strategy Cameron had planned for him. Cameron summons his Number card, Number 25: Force Focus, but soon finds that Yuma's change of actions has affected his foretold future. After disabling Force Focus's effects, Yuma summons Utopia Ray and defeats Cameron. However, the blimp is still on a crash course, but miraculously Kite arrives and brings the blimp into a safe landing, whilst Cameron returns to his old self. Cameron apologized for all the damage he had done, and told Tori that Kite saved them, though Kite responded that he didn't want the WDC to get ruined. After he had left, he apologized to Tori about the whole thing.
37	12	"Double Jeopardy: Part 1" / "Disqualified from the WDC!? Heartland's Assassins, Dextra and Nistro"; Transliteration: "Daburu Di Shi Shikkaku!? Hātorando no Shikyaku Dorowa ando Gōshu" (Japanese: WDC失格!? ハートランドの刺客ドロワ&ゴーシュ)	Yoshifumi Fukushima	December 26, 2011	November 10, 2012
Noticing he is falling behind in the carnival, Flip attempts to get Heart Pieces by trading with other duelists using candy heart pieces, but he soon caught by Mr. Heartland's officials, Dextra and Nistro, after he decided to use a candy heart piece to complete his pass. Displeased by Flip's treatment, Yuma challenges both of them to a duel, faced with disqualification should he lose. Meanwhile, Astral, who is inside the key, encounters Number 96, who has teamed up with the Numbers to fight him, asking him if he remembered his "true mission." However, Utopia steps in to defend him.
38	13	"Double Jeopardy: Part 2" / "Bound To Hope! Hope Sword Mars Slash!!"; Transliteration: "Kibō wo Tsunage! Hōpu Ken Māzu Surasshu!!" (Japanese: 希望をつなげ! ホープ剣マーズ・スラッシュ!!)	Yoshifumi Fukushima	January 9, 2012	November 17, 2012
Yuma manages to survive Nistro's attack, but finds he can't summon his Numbers without Astral around, so he decides he would have to deal without him or Utopia. Astral instructs Utopia to go to Yuma's aid, whilst Number 96 takes the other Numbers unto himself. He instantly tried to attack and corrupt Astral once he had the power to. As Yuma summons Utopia, Dextra summons her Xyz Monster, Photon Papilloperative, the same type as Kite's monsters, leading her and Nistro to learn of Yuma's involvement with Kite and the Numbers. Nistro also summons his Xyz Monster, Photon Strike Bounzer, bringing Yuma's life points down to 100. As Yuma struggles to think of a comeback, Tori and Flip help get his confidence back, which in turn helps to free Astral from Number 96's grip and come to Yuma's aid. Peeved by how Astral didn't come earlier, Yuma tells him to go back into the key. Astral stays, though, telling Yuma that 'all the pieces are in place'. Powering up Utopia, they attempt to defeat Dextra, but Nistro activates a trap that makes Utopia attack him instead, resulting in Yuma's victory. Dextra asks why he took the blow, and Nistro said it felt like the right thing to do. The kids that Flip tricked get their revenge by stealing all his heart pieces, disqualifying him.
39	14	"Pets Peeved" / "The Destined Showdown! Cathy VS Pip"; Transliteration: "Shukumei no Taiketsu! Kyatto-chan VS Doggu-chan" (Japanese: 話宿命の対決！キャットちゃんvsドッグちゃん)	Kenichi Yamashita	January 16, 2012	November 24, 2012
As Yuma and his friends (minus Caswell, who is still resting from his and Bronk's duel with Quattro) meet up with Cat, who has two Heart Pieces, a group of dogs steal Yuma's Heart Pass. Thanks to Cat's ability to communicate with cats, they track them down to a warehouse, where they encounter a supposedly talking dog named Roscoe who leads a gang of dogs. Roscoe challenges Cat to a duel, because she insulted him, in which the fate of both cats and dogs will be decided. Roscoe summons out his Xyz Monster, Sumo King Dog, but Cat manages to survive his attack and summon Cat Girl Magician. It is then revealed the voice behind Roscoe is a young girl named Pip, who had hidden inside Roscoe because she was scared of other people, and dogs were loyal to their owners, no matter what. Cat convinces Pip to continue the duel, though when she gets timid about Cat's tactic, Yuma and the others convince her to fight to the end, allowing her to make a turn around and defeat Cat. Afterwards, Pip returns Yuma's Heart Pass whilst Cathy awards Pip her Heart Pass and Pieces, and convinced her to join the WDC.
40	15	"About Hart" / "Visitor from Heartland: Hart"; Transliteration: "Hātorando Kara Raihōsha Haruto" (Japanese: ハートランドから来訪者 ハルト)	Yasuyuki Suzuki	January 23, 2012	December 1, 2012
As Hart notices the pain Kite is going through for his sake, he breaks free from his restraints and winds up in Heartland City, where he is found by Yuma and Tori, walking in the middle of the road. They soon discover that, besides some mysterious powers, Hart is also able to see and communicate with Astral. Yuma takes Hart back to his place, where he appears to strike up a friendship with Astral. Later that night, Hart runs off in search of Kite, so Yuma and Tori follow him to a windmill plant. Nistro and Dextra arrive to try and take Hart back home, but Hart uses his powers to escape. They arrive at the top of a windmill, but Hart can't find what he was searching for and goes berserk. Astral reads Hart's memories, in which he was protected by Kite until Mr. Heartland captured him. Using this knowledge, Yuma manages to calm Hart down. However, another son of Vetrix, Quinton, arrives and takes control of Hart, who reveals his mission is to destroy the Astral World before leaving with Quinton.
41	16	"Losing Hart" / "Missing Hart! The New Enemy: Vetrix"; Transliteration: "Kieta Haruto! Aratanaru Teki: Toron" (Japanese: 消えたハルト！新たなる敵 トロン)	Tsutomu Kamishiro	January 30, 2012	December 8, 2012
Nistro and Dextra, later joined by Kite, confront Yuma about the whereabouts of Hart, managing to provide a description of the kidnapper thanks to Astral, but forgets what Astral said about the color of his eyes. After Nistro and Dextra leave, Kite agrees to let Yuma help search for Hart. Whilst Astral deduces that Mr. Heartland has a strong role in the mystery surrounding Hart, Hart is brought before Vetrix, who performs a ritual to transfer Hart's powers into his body. Hart's painful cries for help are heard by both Kite and Astral, leading them to a castle in the middle of a lake. Upon entering the castle, Yuma and Kite are confronted by Trey and Quattro, who force them into a Tag Duel.
42	17	"A Dubious Duo" / "Yuma & Kite: A Spirited Tag Duel"; Transliteration: "Yūma to Kaito Tamashii no Taggu Dyueru" (Japanese: 遊馬とカイト 魂のタッグ・デュエル)	Shin Yoshida	February 6, 2012	December 15, 2012
As the Tag Duel begins, Kite shows little willingness to work with Yuma, Shown by how he summoned Photon Field, when someone summons a photon monster, the others without photon monsters take 400 points of damage, knowing Yuma didn't have a photon monster in his deck. Yuma learns from Quattro about how Kite is gathering Numbers to cure Hart's illness, very accurate to Astral and Yuma's guess, and Yuma asked him (Kite) why he didn't tell him about Hart. Trey summons his Number card, Number 33: Chronomaly Machu Mech while Yuma summons Utopia, surprising not only Quattro, who earlier thought Yuma had no chance of winning because he had no numbers, but Trey and Quinton (who, while overseeing the ritual Vetrix is performing to gain Hart's power, is watching the duel on a screen) as well. However, Quattro then summons out Number 15: Gimmick Puppet Giant Grinder to destroy Utopia, but Yuma manages to protect Kite from his attack. Quattro then torments Kite by showing him Hart's torture, provoking him to summon Galaxy-Eyes Photon Dragon, falling into a trap laid out by Trey, weakening Galaxy Eyes and preparing to deal massive damage to Kite.
43	18	"The Dragon Awakens" / "The Miraculous Overlay! Neo Galaxy-Eyes Photon Dragon"; Transliteration: "Kiseki no Ōbārei! Neo Garakushī Aizu Foton Doragon" (Japanese: 奇跡のオーバーレイ！超銀河眼の光子龍)	Shin Yoshida	February 13, 2012	December 22, 2012
Yuma sacrifices some of his own life points to protect Kite. He then brings back Utopia, performs a Chaos Xyz Evolution (using only Utopia), and summons Chaos Number 39: Utopia Ray. This surprises Trey, Quattro, and Quinton, (who had never seen a Chaos Number before.) Yuma then manages to destroy Giant Grinder, but fails to defeat Quattro, who summons a new Xyz Monster, Number 40: Gimmick Puppet of Strings. Yuma once again reduces his own life points to keep Kite from losing. As Yuma convinces Kite to fighting, Vetrix starts to intrude on Hart's memories shared with his brother. Hart fends Vetrix off and gives his power to Kite. Using his newfound power and Yuma's monsters, Kite manages to summon the Xyz Monster, Neo Galaxy-Eyes Photon Dragon, and defeats both Trey and Quattro.
44	19	"Rock and a Hard Place" / "The Forked Paths of Destiny! Yuma Throws Away Dueling!"; Transliteration: "Unmei no Wakaremichi! Dyueru wo Suteta Yūma!" (Japanese: 運命の分かれ道！デュエルを捨てた遊馬！)	Yasuyuki Suzuki	February 20, 2012	December 29, 2012
As Trey and Quattro's crests protect them from having their Numbers taken, they are teleported away by Vetrix before Quinton appears and returns Hart, who has fallen into a coma after giving Kite his power. He then proceeds to tell Yuma that his father, Kazuma, is alive in the Astral World before disappearing. Yuma becomes conflicted as to whether he should collect Numbers to either restore Astral's memories and learn about Kazuma's whereabouts or help cure Hart's illness. Yuma prepares to leave home in search of his father and wants to quit dueling, but is stopped by Roku, who challenges Yuma to a duel in order to remind him about his love of dueling. Meanwhile, as Vetrix begins to experiment with the power he had managed to take from Hart, Roku tells Yuma about Mr. Heartland and Dr. Faker and how they relate to Kazuma.
45	20	"Ruffled Feathers" / "A Nemesis Shows Up Late! The Sparrow VS Nistro"; Transliteration: "Okuretekita Kyōteki! Robin VS Gōshu" (Japanese: 遅れてきた強敵！ロビンVSゴーシ)	Tsutomu Kamishiro	February 27, 2012	January 19, 2013
As the final day of the WDC preliminaries begins, Nistro and Dextra quit the WCD committee in order to start collecting Heart Pieces. Spotting Nelson, in his Sparrow getup, who had accumulated several Heart Pieces himself, Nistro challenges him to a duel. Nelson manages to summon the Rank 10 Xyz Monster, Super Dimensional Robot Galaxy Destroyer, but Nistro manages to summon his own Xyz Monster, Heroic Champion - Excalibur. Then, Nistro uses Excalibur to destroy Galaxy Destroyer, allowing him to win the Duel. Yuma asks why Nelson was dueling as the Sparrow, and he said that it was because he wanted his enemies to by psyched out because they were dueling the Sparrow.
46	21	"Family Leave" / "For the Sake of Family... The Gentle Avenger: Trey!!"; Transliteration: "Kazoku no Tameni... Yasashiki Fukushūsha Surī!!" (Japanese: 家族のために...優しき復讐者・III！！)	Kenichi Yamashita	March 5, 2012	January 26, 2013
While searching for an opponent, Yuma encounters several duelists that had become severely beaten after facing against Shark. Determined to figure out what's wrong with him, Yuma challenges Shark to a duel while Trey, who had managed to see Astral during following his tag duel with Yuma, spectates. It soon becomes apparent that Yuma is losing on purpose to remind Shark that duelling is supposed to be fun, and so Shark can take out his anger on Yuma, helping him to overcome the hatred in his heart caused by the Number card he gained. Afterwards, Trey goes to Yuma's house, becoming interested in his way of fighting. After spending dinner with Yuma's family, Trey is reminded of how his own family once was, and becomes jealous of Yuma's easy way of life. Reaffirming his loyalty to his family, Trey challenges Yuma to a duel.
47	22	"Sky's the Limit" / "Yuma's Denied!? The Stolen "Feeling the Flow"!"; Transliteration: "Yūma ga Kiken!? Ubawareta "Kattobingu"!" (Japanese: 遊馬が棄権!? 奪われた「かっとビング！」)	Shin Yoshida	March 12, 2012	February 2, 2013
Yuma confronts Trey, who has been given a strange power from Vetrix which allows him to notice Astral's presence. Trey summons Number 33: Chronomaly Machu Mech, along with his ace monster Aztec Mask Golem, but Astral helps Yuma defend against his attacks. Infuriated by Yuma's attempts to help him, Trey uses the power Vetrix gave him on Yuma which turns his suit into a Roman gladiator armor. Trey then puts a memory bond on Yuma, making Astral and the key become invisible to him, erasing everything his father taught him, including not being afraid and 'feeling the flow'. Trey also makes Yuma believe he is a friendless scaredy cat. Trey then proceeds to use his power to chain Astral to a tower, leaving him helpless to aid Yuma. Trey proceeds to laugh maniacally at Yuma's despair.
48	23	"Exit: Astral" / "Astral, Dead...!?"; Transliteration: "Asutoraru, Shisu...!?" (Japanese: アストラル、死す...!?)	Shin Yoshida	March 19, 2012	February 9, 2013
As Yuma becomes too scared to face up against Trey, he comes in danger of losing the duel. Before the final blow can be struck, Astral uses up his power to recover some of Yuma's memories so he can defend himself, prompting Trey to unleash his power on Astral, destroying him. As Yuma's friends try to help Yuma remember, Trey uses his power against them too, imprisoning them within an energy field. Just then, the figure of Kazuma from inside of Yuma's Key uses the power of Yuma's Numbers to break the power of Trey's Crest and recover Yuma's memories. After learning of Astral's death, Yuma tries to deny it by saying it was one of the lies Trey put in his head, before bursting into tears. Yuma remembers the advice Astral gave him and destroys Chronomaly Machu Mech with Utopia, but Trey summons a new Number monster, Number 6: Chronomaly Atlandis.
49	24	"Crestfallen" / "The End of a Fierce Fight! Utopia Ray VS Atlandis"; Transliteration: "Gekitō no Hate! Hōpu Rei VS Atorantaru" (Japanese: 激闘の果て！ホープレイVSアトランタル)	Shin Yoshida	March 26, 2012	February 16, 2013
Yuma summons out Utopia Ray, but Trey manages to stop his attack. Just then, Trey starts to feel the side effects of using Atlandis with Vetrix's power, with his body beginning to be overwhelmed by the power of his enhanced Crest, and he activates a trap card that will take them both out on his next turn. However, this also begins to destroy the real world location, and begins opening a portal to the Barian World, with Trey being unable to stop it. After realizing the consequences of his actions, Trey has a change of heart and decides to help Yuma stop the world's impending destruction. When Yuma mentions they may be able to save everyone using the power of ZEXAL, he takes on the power of Trey's crest and overcomes its curse to revive Astral. Astral reappears inside of Yuma's key, and Yuma's father encourages Astral to go out and help Yuma. Astral reappeared, and Yuma cried tears of joy, very embarrassed by it. As Atlandis absorbs Trey, Yuma and Astral use ZEXAL, summoning the Zexal Weapon - Phoenix Bow to power up Utopia Ray and win the duel. As Trey separates from Atlandis, the power of his crest is broken, and he loses his crest. As the world returns to normal, Trey tells Yuma that he was the only friend he has ever had, and he asks Yuma to help restore his family and leaves behind his Numbers he was carrying and the final Heart Piece Yuma needs before returning to Vetrix. Trey then falls into a coma.
