= Yu-Gi-Oh! Zexal season 4 =

Yu-Gi-Oh! Zexal
- Season 4
- Official Japanese DVD Cover of Yu-Gi-Oh! Zexal II episodes 74–85
- No. of episodes: 25

Release
- Original network: TV Tokyo
- Original release: October 7, 2012 – April 7, 2013

Season chronology
- ← Previous; Yu-Gi-Oh! Zexal; Season 3 Next → Season 5

Yu-Gi-Oh! Zexal season 4 is the first season of Yu-Gi-Oh! Zexal II. It consists of episodes 74–98 of Yu-Gi-Oh! Zexal and first aired on TV Tokyo from October 7, 2012 to April 7, 2013.

The opening theme is "Unbreakable Heart" (折れないハート, Arenai Hāto) by Hideaki Takatori, while the ending theme is "Artist" (アーティスト, Ātisuto) by Vistlip.

== Episode list ==
No. overall	No. in season	English dub title / Japanese translated title	Written by	Original release date	American air date
74	1	"Attack of the Barians: Part 1" / "Barian Invasion! The Frightening Chaos Xyz Evolution"; Transliteration: "Barian Shūrai! Kyōgaku no Kaosu Ekushīzu Chenji!!" (Japanese: バリアン襲来! 驚愕のカオス・エクシーズ・チェンジ!!)	Shin Yoshida	October 7, 2012	August 17, 2013
As peace returns to Heartland City following the World Duel Carnival, Astral, who has collected 50 of the 100 original Number cards at this point, receives a strange vision from within Yuma's key. Meanwhile, an emissary sent by Dumon from the Barian World, named Girag, arrives in Heartland City, and brainwashes a gang of bikers to follow under him, using the spell card Rank-Up-Magic Barian's Force. His appearance prevokes a reaction from Shark's sister, Rio. As Yuma, Shark and Tori go to check up on Rio, she utters something about someone planning to take something important, reminding Yuma of the words he heard when first activated the powers of his key. Just then, Yuma receives word that the biker gang's leader, Fender, has attacked his school, demanding he brings his Numbers. Fearing Astral could be put in danger, Yuma leaves his key with Tori as he heads to the school and confronts Fender. As the duel begins, Fender instantly summons his Xyz monster, Mechquipped Angineer. As Astral senses Yuma is in danger, Utopia sends itself over to Yuma, allowing him to summon it and deal some damage. Just then, Fender activates the spell card Rank-Up-Magic Barian's Force to perform a Chaos Xyz Evolution on his Angineer, to upgrade it to the Chaos Xyz Monster Mechquipped Djinn Angeneral, and steal Utopia's Overlay Units.
75	2	"Attack of the Barians: Part 2" / "The Winning Formula: Crush the Chaos Xyz"; Transliteration: "Soroe Shōri no Hōteishiki: Uchikudake Kaosu Ekushīzu" (Japanese: 揃え勝利の方程式 打ち砕けカオス・エクシーズ)	Shin Yoshida	October 14, 2012	August 24, 2013
Angeneral manages to destroy Utopia, despite not being a Number, causing real damage to both Yuma and Astral. Astral makes contact with Tori, asking her to bring the key to Yuma. As Kite and Shark hold off Fender's lackies, Yuma takes more damage from Fender. Tori delivers the key to Yuma, who explains the dreams he's been having to Astral. Encouraging Yuma to stand up and fight with him, Astral gives him the advice needed to bring out Utopia Ray and defeat Fender. After the duel, Kite and Shark reveal they have dealt with all of Fender's allies, while Orbital knocks Fender out by shocking him, removing the control that Barian World had on him. As Yuma, Shark, and Kite decide to team up to face this new enemy, a mysterious student watches them from above, his mouth curling into an evil smile.
76	3	"Hard Knox" / "Here I am, for the Greater Good! My Name is Ray Shadows"; Transliteration: "Yokare to Omotte Tadaima Sanjō! Shingetsu Rei to Mōshimasu" (Japanese: よかれと思ってただいま参上! 真月零と申します)	Yasuyuki Suzuki	October 21, 2012	August 31, 2013
On his way to school, Yuma encounters an overly-positive, well-meaning transfer student named Ray Shadows and ends up getting dragged around by him. Meanwhile, a pro duelist named Devon Knox visits the school to have duels with the students. When Yuma expresses his interest in dueling him, Ray takes it upon himself to try to find Devon and convince him to duel. However, Devon is possessed by Girag and violently duels against Ray to get Yuma's attention. Yuma begins a duel with him and summons out Number 34: Terror-Byte whilst Devon summons out his ace monster, Coach King Giantrainer. After using its effect damaging abilities, one of which backfires against him, Devon uses Rank-Up-Magic Barian's Force on Giantrainer to upgrade it into the Chaos Xyz monster Coach Lord Ultimatrainer, using its ability to test Yuma's drawing luck. Yuma manages to survive the effect and use the monster cards he was forced to discard against Devon before bringing out Utopia Ray and winning the duel, freeing Devon from the Barians' control.
77	4	"Rule Duel" / "Dueling Is Against School Rules!? Sally Forth! The Chief Disciplinarian"; Transliteration: "Dyueru no Midare wa Kōsoku Ihan!? Shutsugeki! Tokumei Fūki Komandā" (Japanese: デュエルの乱れは校則違反!? 出撃！ 特命風紀コマンダー)	Gō Zappa	October 28, 2012	September 7, 2013
After Ray nominates him, Yuma is chosen as the next class president, much to Caswell's dismay. The Student Council President, Carlyle Chesterton, who is under Girag's command, assigns Caswell as a "Special Disciplinary Commander", who begins enforcing harsh rules on the students. As Yuma decides he has had enough and confronts Carlyle, he challenges him to a duel, with Caswell as the referee, throwing in all sorts of rules which obstruct Yuma's dueling. Carlyle summons his Xyz Monster, Norito the Moral Leader, and deals some damage to Yuma, though he manages to find a workaround to Caswell's rules. As Caswell laments how he isn't class president anymore, Yuma reminds him of his true self, allowing him to throw away the role of disciplinary commander & allow the duel to resume normally as it's always supposed to. Carlyle then uses Barian's Force to upgrade Norito into the Chaos Xyz monster, Simon the Great Moral Leader, but Yuma manages to bring out Utopia and easily win the duel. Afterwards, Yuma relinquishes his role as class president back to Caswell while Girag finds a new target to put under his control.
78	5	"The Adventures of Artimus Stanleyus" / "Shark's Rage!! Save The Captured Sister!"; Transliteration: "Shāku Gekkō!! Torawareta Imōto o Sukue!" (Japanese: シャーク激昂!! 捕らわれた妹を救え！)	Mitsutaka Hirota	November 4, 2012	September 14, 2013
A manga artist named Art Stanley requests that Yuma and Shark be models for his manga, but Shark refuses. Unknown to them, Art is under the Barians' control, tailoring Shark to report his weakness to Girag. The next day, Shark discovers that Rio has gone missing and is confronted by Art, who challenges him to a duel. Art quickly summons his Xyz monster, Comics Hero King Arthur, and uses Rio as a means to stop Shark from fighting back, claiming she will become trapped forever if he is defeated. Believing Art's sketchbook may provide a hint to his weakness, Yuma and Ray set off in search for it. Meanwhile, Art forces Shark to summon out Shark Drake and deals a lot of damage before activating Barian's Force, ranking up Comics Hero King Arthur into the Chaos Xyz monster, Comics Hero Legend Arthur, using it to destroy Shark Drake. After some encouragement from Yuma, Sharks calls out to Rio and manages to both free her from captivity and awaken her. Shark soon regains his resolve and brings out Shark Drake Veiss to win the duel.
79	6	"Doom in Bloom" / "Frozen Fury!! Rio Kastle, the Ice Queen"; Transliteration: "Hyōketsu Ranbu! Kōri no Jyoō Kamishiro Rio" (Japanese: 氷結乱舞!! 氷の女王 神代璃緒)	Mitsutaka Hirota	November 11, 2012	September 21, 2013
Rio starts attending Duel Academy, instantly becoming popular with the boys and proving embarrassing for Shark. As Rio manages to overwhelm any club offers with her amazing talent, she and the others are approached by the Flower Arrangement Club's president, Lotus Henazoe, who soon start putting everyone besides Yuma into a trance, revealing herself to be under Girag's control. As Lotus challenges Yuma to a duel, Rio decides to take her on in his place. Lotus summons her Xyz Monster, Battlecruiser Dianthus, and soon uses Barian's Force to upgrade it to the Chaos Xyz monster, Battleship Cherry Blossom, bringing Rio's life points down to 200. Rio soon summons her own Xyz monster, Ice Beast Zerofyne, and manages to use her cards to beat Lotus.
80	7	"Rivals in the Ring" / "A Fierce One-on-One Battle!! Yuma VS Alito, the Determined Fighter"; Transliteration: "Mōkō Taiman Batoru!! Yūma vs Fukutsu no Tōshi Arito" (Japanese: 猛攻タイマンバトル!! 遊馬 VS 不屈の闘士アリト)	Gō Zappa	November 18, 2012	September 28, 2013
Noticing Girag's repeated failures, Dumon sends another one of his disciples, Alito, to the Duel Academy, where he ends up getting a crush on Tori. Alito tries to make various attempts to woo Tori, but all of them are inadvertently thwarted by Yuma. Wanting to prove himself, Alito challenges Yuma to a duel, quickly summoning out his Xyz monster, Battlin' Boxer Lead Yoke, and soon realizes who he is up against. Yuma summons his Xyz monster, Gauntlet Launcher, and manages to win by countering Alito's own counters. After the duel, Alito takes a shining to Yuma and declares him his rival.
81	8	"The Friendship Games" / "Tori's Chaos Xyz Evolution!? The Tumultuous Sports Duel Tournament"; Transliteration: "Kotori ga Kaosu Ekushīzu Chenji!? Haran no Supōtsu Dyueru Taikai" (Japanese: 小鳥がカオスエクシーズ・チェンジ!? 波乱のスポーツデュエル大会)	Shin Yoshida	November 25, 2012	October 5, 2013
When Ray makes an innocent suggestion to have a mascot girl for the Numbers club, the resulting arguments causes Tori, Cathy and the others to fall out with each other. Seeing an opportunity, Girag approaches Yuma, who is unaware of his connection to Barian World, and suggests they hold a sports duel tournament to help them make up. The tournament begins the next day, with Yuma and Shark's team pushing ahead while the team consisting of Tori and Cathy lags behind, though they manage to get over their fighting. As Girag arranges a duel between Yuma and Tori's teams, he puts Tori and Cathy under the Barian's control. With Shark going home for the day, Girag ends up getting drafted into Yuma's team, putting him in an awkward situation. Tori summons out her Xyz Monster, Fairy Cheer Girl, and uses Barian's Force to upgrade it to the Chaos Xyz Monster, Dark Fairy Cheer Girl. However, Yuma manages to summon Utopia and power it up with Girag's trap to win the duel, freeing the girls from the Barians' control.
82	9	"Sphere Cube Calamity: Part 1" / "The Lone Barian Knight: Mizar, the Galaxy-Eyes Master Appears"; Transliteration: "Kokō no Barian Naito Gyarakushī Aizu Tsukai Mizaeru Arawaru" (Japanese: 孤高のバリアン騎士 銀河眼使いミザエル現る)	Gō Zappa	December 9, 2012	October 12, 2013
As Dumon sends yet another Barian emissary, named Mizar, to Earth, Yuma continues to be plagued with nightmares about losing Astral. Noticing Yuma's lack of energy, Haru asks Tori to take him to Roku's place, where they again meet Kaze, who gives Yuma some spell cards from Roku. The next day, as Rio suddenly prophesies about a fearsome dragon, Yuma is confronted by Mizar, who traps him in a Sphere Field, forcing him into a duel. Determined to protect Astral, Yuma instantly summons Utopia, using one of Roku's cards to protect his overlay units from Barian's Force. To both Yuma and Astral's surprise, however, Mizar summons an Over-Hundred Number card, Number 107: Galaxy-Eyes Tachyon Dragon, which happens to be the dragon from Yuma's nightmares.
83	10	"Sphere Cube Calamity: Part 2" / "The Astronomical Dimensional Dragon!! Galaxy-Eyes Tachyon Dragon"; Transliteration: "Chōdokyūjigenryū!! Gyarakushī Aizu Takion Doragon" (Japanese: 超弩級次元竜!! 銀河眼の時空竜)	Gō Zappa	December 16, 2012	October 19, 2013
Using Tachyon Dragon's abilities, Mizar destroys Utopia, knocking Yuma back into the Sphere Field, which deals real damage to him. As Yuma is too weak to continue the duel, Kite arrives on the scene and takes Yuma's place in the duel. Kite summons Galaxy-Eyes Photon Dragon, but struggles against Tachyon Dragon's abilities. However, he manages to survive Mizar's attack and summon out Neo Galaxy-Eyes Photon Dragon, managing to destroy Tachyon Dragon. Just then, Mizar revives Tachyon Dragon and reveals his true form, using Barian's Force to evolve it into Chaos Number 107: Neo Galaxy-Eyes Tachyon Dragon. His new monster, however, turns out to be too powerful for the Sphere Field to contain and Mizar is forced to cancel the duel. As the Sphere Field disintegrates, Shark attempts to catch Yuma, but ends up falling into a crater with him.
84	11	"Playing Defense" / "Rise Up! Yuma VS Shark, A Healing Duel"; Transliteration: "Yomigaere!! Yūma VS Shāku Fukkatsu no Dyueru" (Japanese: 蘇れ!!遊馬VSシャーク復活の決闘)	Gō Zappa	December 23, 2012	October 26, 2013
As Yuma and Shark are hospitalized following their fall, Yuma becomes downhearted about his duel with Mizar. Irritated by his behavior, Shark decides to steal Yuma's key to lure him into a duel. Shark instantly brings out both Aero Shark and Black Ray Lancer, dealing a lot of damage to Yuma. Insulted by Yuma's defensive play, Shark brings out Shark Fortress to break through Yuma's defenses. As Shark makes his final attack, Yuma's wishes to keep dueling with Astral brings him to his side, giving Yuma the tactics to turn the duel around, summoning out Heroic Champion - Excalibur and winning the duel with its abilities.
85	12	"Counter Offensive: Part 1" / "A Lightning–Speed Counter Battle! Alito, The Determined Fighter!"; Transliteration: "Shippū Jinrai no Kauntā Batoru! Ketsui no Tōshi Arito" (Japanese: 疾風迅雷のカウンターバトル！決意の闘士アリト)	Yasuyuki Suzuki	January 6, 2013	November 2, 2013
As Yuma and Ray make their way to school, they are pursued by a group of Barian-possessed students and are forced to run. They become cornered, but are assisted by the arrival of Shark, Tori and Rio, who help Yuma fight off the forces of Barian World. Just then, Alito arrives and protects Yuma, defeating all the other students in the process, as he wanted to battle Yuma fair and square. With his alliance to Barian World revealed, Alito challenges Yuma to a duel, activating a Sphere Field along with it. Alito instantly summons Battlin' Boxer Lead Yoke while Yuma summons out Utopia, and the two engage in a battle of counter traps. Yuma eventually manages to destroy Lead Yoke by countering its ability. As Yuma and Alito become excited by the duel, Astral detects something amiss with the Sphere Field.
86	13	"Counter Offensive: Part 2" / "Roar! Chaos Number: The Final Blow to Yuma"; Transliteration: "Unare! Kaosu Nanbāzu: Yūma ni Muketa Fainaru Burō" (Japanese: 唸れ！カオス・ナンバーズ 遊馬に向けたファイナルブロー)	Yasuyuki Suzuki	January 12, 2013	November 9, 2013
Alito summons his Over-Hundred Number monster, Number 105: Battlin' Boxer Star Cestus, while Yuma and Astral enter ZEXAL and summons Utopia Ray, both reaching a stalemate. Alito then reveals his true form and upgrades Cestus to Chaos Number 105: Battlin' Boxer Comet Cestus. Yuma then summons the Zexal Weapon - Eagle Claw to equip to Utopia Ray and, after a barrage of counters from both side, manages to win the duel, using the effects of Eagle Claw. As Astral finds he cannot take Alito's Number card (since Over-Hundred Numbers are not a part of his memories), which promts Alito to take his leave, Astral's body suddenly weakens from his prolonged exposure to the Barian Sphere Field. Later on, Girag finds a severely beaten Alito, who claims that Ray attacked him, before passing out.
87	14	"Dual Duel: Part 1" / "Girag's Brutal Assault! Explode Forth, Bukotsu the Pressure Point-Striking Delinquent"; Transliteration: "Gilagu Mōshū! Sakuretsu, Hikō Shibaku Bukotsu" (Japanese: ギラグ猛襲！炸裂、秘孔死爆無惚)	Mitsutaka Hirota	January 20, 2013	November 16, 2013
As Mizar takes Alito back to Barian World to recover, Girag vows to take revenge against Ray. He issues a duel challenge to Yuma the next day, demanding that he brings Ray with him, believing him to be the one who beat Alito. Deciding to have faith in Ray, Yuma goes to face Girag alone. However, Ray hears about the duel from Tori and Bronk and goes to join Yuma, facing against Girag in a battle royale duel. As the duel begins, with Girag revealing his true form, Yuma immediately brings out Utopia. Girag soon summons out his Over-Hundred Number card, Number 106: Giant Hand, dealing some massive damage to Ray despite Yuma's efforts to protect him. After Astral urges Yuma that protecting Ray is risky, he passes out from the damage caused by the Sphere Field.
88	15	"Dual Duel: Part 2" / "The Pulse of V: A Super Rebirth, Utopia Ray V!!"; Transliteration: "Bui no Kodō: Chōshinsei Hōpurei Bui!!" (Japanese: Vの鼓動 超新生ホープレイV!!)	Mitsutaka Hirota	January 27, 2013	November 23, 2013
Weakened by the Sphere Field, Astral is forced to retreat to the key, which Yuma gives to Tori to look after. Just then, Giant Hand's effect destroys Utopia and deals damage to Yuma, forcing him to play on the defensive. Girag then uses Barian's Force to evolve Giant Hand into Chaos Number 106: Giant Red Hand, with Ray taking damage in order to protect Yuma from its attack. Ray then proceeds to help defend Yuma from Girag's attacks, as well as revive Utopia, before giving Yuma a card called Rank-Up-Magic Limited Barian's Force. Yuma uses this card to evolve Utopia into Utopia Ray V, using it to destroy Giant Red Hand and defeat Girag. Because of the severe injuries Girag suffered during the duel, he is forced to retreat to Barian World to recover. After the duel, Ray reveals himself to Yuma as a Barian's Guardian tasked with defeating the evil Barians, asking him to keep it a secret from everyone.
89	16	"Darkness Dawns" / "The United Front Against Dark Astral: A Challenge to the Giant of Shadows!!"; Transliteration: "Kyōtō Dāku Asutoraru Kage no Kyojin-e no Chōsen!!" (Japanese: 共闘ダークアストラル 影の巨人への挑戦！！)	Shin Yoshida	February 3, 2013	November 30, 2013
As Astral recovers he is again confronted by Number 96, who tells him he cannot win against the Barians without accepting his evil side. As Astral refuses this and looks into the Numbers, a mysterious Shadow Giant appears before him, saying he must be tested, summoning Yuma inside the key and challenging him to a duel. The giant quickly summons out his Xyz Monster, Unformed Void whilst Yuma summons out Number 61: Volcasaurus and Number 6: Chronomaly Atlandis, but the giant is able to use Unformed Void's ability to counter Yuma's attack and destroy Atlandis. Number 96 appears again to remind Astral of his advice, saying that something may happen to Yuma if he loses inside the key. Fearing for Yuma's safety, Astral decides to undo the seal on Number 96, with Yuma reluctantly summoning out Dark Mist, using its abilities to defeat the giant. After the duel, Yuma and Astral are shown Astral's true memories, learning his mission is to obtain a powerful card known as the Numeron Code that can shape worlds. Yuma and Astral then return to the real world while Number 96 disappears to somewhere else.
90	17	"You Give Love a Bot Name" / "Operation: Save Lillybot!? I, Who Am In Love, Am Invincible, Roger"; Transliteration: "Obomi Dakkan Sakusen!? Koisuru oira wa Muteki de Arimasu" (Japanese: オボミ奪還作戦！？恋スルオイラハ無敵デアリマス)	Touko Machida	February 10, 2013	December 7, 2013
After coming across a romantic movie, Orbital ends up falling in love with Lilybot. Upon misreading a dropped shopping list, believing it to be a cry for help, Orbital assumes Lilybot has been abducted by Yuma and challenges him to a duel. Orbital summons out his Xyz Monster, Googly-Eyes Drum Dragon, whilst Yuma summons out Muzurhythm. Although Yuma initially destroys Googly-Eyes, Orbital revives it and powers it up to deal Yuma some big damage. However, Yuma then summons out Temtempo and Melomelody and combines the power of his Musical Djinn monsters to defeat Orbital. After a failed attempt at getting back at Yuma, Tori manages to help Orbital become friends with Lilybot.
91	18	"Take a Chance" / "Shark VS Rio: The 100th Dueling Squabble"; Transliteration: "Shāku VS Rio: Hyakku-senme no Kenka Dyueru!!" (Japanese: シャークvs璃緒 100戦目の喧嘩デュエル!!)	Mitsutaka Hirota	February 17, 2013	December 14, 2013
Bronk gets the idea that he will be able to impress Rio if he beats Shark in a duel. After Shark turns down his offer of a duel, saying he is not even at Yuma's level, Bronk jumps to conclusions and soon a rumor spreads around the school that Yuma and Rio are dating. Believing Shark to be the cause of these rumors, Rio challenges him to a duel, which turns out to be their 100th Dueling Squabble between siblings. Shark summons out Aero Shark whilst Rio summons Zerofyne. However, Rio is put in a pinch when Shark counters her strategy by summoning out Black Ray Lancer. As Shark shows little faith in Rio's confidence as a duelist, Bronk gives her words of encouragement, giving her the courage to summon out Ice Princess Zereort and deal damage to Shark. However, Shark responds by turning her field spell against her summoning out the powerful Shark Caesar and winning the duel. After the duel, it is revealed the rumor was all due to Flip and Caswell's misunderstanding, prompting a swift revenge from Rio.
92	19	"An Imperfect Couple: Part 1" / "A Fierce Couple Duel: "That Anna Chick" and I are a Tag Team!?"; Transliteration: "Gekisen Kappuru Dyueru "Anna Yatsu" to Ore ga Taggu!?" (Japanese: 激戦カップルデュエル ｢アンナ奴｣と俺がタッグ!?)	Gō Zappa	February 24, 2013	January 11, 2014
At the wedding of pro duelist Brook Walker, Anna catches the bouquet containing the spell card, Devoted Love, but she assumes is useless. As Anna decides to visit Yuma during his school's culture festival, Ray informs them of a Couple Duel tournament Brook and her new husband, Mayday, are hosting, which is said to be Brook's last duel. Wanting to find out more, Anna borrows Tori's school uniform so she can enter the tournament, forcing Yuma to be her partner. Prior to the duel, Brook is approached by Vector in energy form. As Anna confronts Brook over why she wants to quit dueling, they decide to settle things with a tag duel. The duel starts with Brook and Mayday summoning their monsters Unsinkable Titanica and Indestructible Airship Hindenkraft whilst Anna uses Yuma's monster to summon out Gustav Max. Mayday responds by summoning out his Xyz monster, Skypalace Gangaridai, destroying Gustav Max and launching a direct attack at Yuma.
93	20	"An Imperfect Couple: Part 2" / "Self Sacrificing Love: Yuma, I've Entrusted You With My Last Draw!!"; Transliteration: "Kenshinteki Ai: Yūma ni Takuta Rasuto Dorō!!" (Japanese: 献身的な愛 遊馬に託したラストドロー!!)	Gō Zappa	March 3, 2013	January 18, 2014
Yuma manages to survive the direct by utilizing his trap card well, and summons Gauntlet Launcher, but Anna ends up using it to bring back Gustav Max, much to Yuma's irritation. Just then, Brook is possessed by Vector and uses Barian's Force to rank up Gangaridai into the Chaos Xyz monster, Skypalace Babylon, with Yuma forced to take damage to protect Anna's life points. As Mayday prepares to launch an attack towards Yuma, Anna uses the spell she received from Brook, Devoted Love, protecting Yuma and allowing him to draw a card at the cost of her own life points. Yuma uses Limited Barian's Force to bring out Utopia Ray V to defeat both Brook and Mayday. Following the duel, Brook reveals to Anna that she is not quitting dueling but is instead taking a break from it due to being pregnant. Meanwhile, Astral grows concerned about the Barian card that Yuma used.
94	21	"Enter Vector" / "Shadows's Crisis! The Attack of Vector, the Manipulator!"; Transliteration: "Shingetsu no Kiki! Anyakusha Bekutā no Shūgeki" (Japanese: 裏目の危機！暗躍者ベクターの襲撃)	Yasuyuki Suzuki	March 10, 2013	January 25, 2014
Yuma comes across Ray facing off against a Barian emissary named Vector, who flees when Yuma arrives on the scene. Ray warns Yuma about Vector, giving Yuma some more Barian cards, reminding him not to tell Astral about them. The next day, Vector appears before Yuma and Astral and forces them to duel him, revealing himself to be the Barian emissary that possessed Dr. Faker. Vector summons out Number 66: Master Key Beetle and seals away Yuma's Limited Barian's Force card. Yuma summons out Utopia and manages to destroy Master Key Beetle and recover his card, but Vector manages to revive it, recover his life points and summon tokens to destroy Utopia. As Ray arrives to give Yuma support, Yuma uses one of the cards he received from Ray, V Salamander, to revive Utopia and evolve it into Utopia Ray V, using V Salamander's effects to defeat Vector. Just then, Vector captures Ray and takes him to the Barian World, leaving Astral with Number 66: Master Key Beetle, which Vector said is the key to their final battle.
95	22	"The Search for Shadows" / "Let's Go, To the Land of the Final Battle! Airship of the Emperor's Key, Liftoff!!"; Transliteration: "Iza Kessen no Chi e! Ō no Kagi no Hikōsen, Hasshin!" (Japanese: いざ決戦の地へ！皇の鍵の飛行船、発進！！)	Touko Machida	March 17, 2013	February 1, 2014
Kite arrives just as Ray is taken to Barian World. After cowering and whining before Kite, Yuma is slapped to the ground, being told to toughen up. Later on, Astral discovers that the Master Key Beetle is the final key to start up the Emperor's Airship. Meanwhile, Shark, Yuma and Kite discuss what to do about Ray. In the middle of their discussion, they are alerted by Orbital 7 that a new anomaly is forming over Heartland City. Just as they arrive at the anomaly, Yuma's key bursts with light and a portal opens above them. The Emperor's Airship passes through the portal and crashes onto the top of the building. Astral then explains what happened with him and the ship. Determined to find Ray, Yuma prepares for the trip to Barian World. Meanwhile, Rio begs Shark to take her, and Shark obliges. The next day Yuma attempts to leave without the family noticing, but instead is surprised and helped by them. The three regroup at the crash site, however the whole gang offers to go on behalf of Ray. Yuma is then appointed captain and each person takes a different station to operate the airship. After entering the portal, they are attacked by rogue duel monsters and soon after sucked into a black hole. Yuma and the others wake up in the interstellar graveyard, Sargasso, where Vector, Mizar and Dumon await. Vector claims that Ray is dead, which enrages Yuma as he prepares to face off against him, with Shark and Kite facing off against Dumon and Mizar respectively. As Kite, Shark, and Yuma summon out their Xyz monsters however, they are suddenly hit by a field effect that inflicts 500 points of damage to each of them.
96	23	"Shadows of Deception" / "The Mad Vector - Battle Atop the Ominous Sargasso!"; Transliteration: "Kyouki no Bekutā: Makyou Sarugasso no Tatakai!" (Japanese: 狂気のベクター 魔境サルガッソの闘い！)	Mitsutaka Hirota	March 24, 2013	February 8, 2014
Sargasso is revealed to be a field spell which inflicts damage to players using Xyz Monsters. Vector, Dumon, and Mizar summon their Over-Hundred Numbers: Number 104: Masquerade, Number 102: Star Seraph Sentry, and Number 107: Galaxy-Eyes Tachyon Dragon, while also protecting themselves from Sargasso's effects through the spell card Sargasso's Lighthouse, though Mizar refrains from doing so, in order to fight on equal grounds with Kite. Blinded by his rage, Yuma brings out Utopia Ray V and destroys Masquerade. Just then, Vector seemingly disappears and Ray appears to come back to life, only for him to reveal he was Vector all along. Then, Vector undergoes Barian Battlemorph, transforming into his true Barian form. Then, Vector uses a trap to banish Yuma's V cards, restore his life points, and subject Yuma's deck to deck destruction, leaving Yuma with only three cards left in his deck.
97	24	"Sinister Shadows" / "Countdown to Defeat! The Terror of Deck Destruction!"; Transliteration: "Haiboku-he no Kauntodaun! Dekki Hakai no Kyoufu" (Japanese: 敗北へのカウントダウン！ デッキ破壊の恐怖)	Mitsutaka Hirota	March 31, 2013	February 15, 2014
Yuma continues to be put under pressure by Vector as he decreases his deck size even further and revives Masquerade. Meanwhile, Shark and Kite summon Shark Drake Veiss and Neo Galaxy-Eyes Photon Dragon respectively, while Mizar uses Barian's Force to summon Chaos Number 107: Neo Galaxy-Eyes Tachyon Dragon, even though doing so means he loses 500 more life points due to Sargasso's effect. Just then, a black hole appears, threatening to swallow up the spaceship along with Tori and the others inside. Vector suggests that Yuma may be able to save them if he relinquishes all of his Numbers. As Yuma becomes conflicted between saving Astral and saving his friends, Tori urges him to keep dueling, while Orbital 7 arrives to assist them in getting the ship to safety. Yuma and Astral attempt to perform ZEXAL. Unfortunately, Astral was tainted with the power of Chaos and falls under its control, and forces Yuma to fuse with him, resulting in a Dark ZEXAL fusion.
98	25	"Shadows End" / "Break Through the Limit!! "King of Wishes, Utopia Ray Victory""; Transliteration: "Genkai Toppa!! "Kibō Ō Hōpurei Vikutorī"" (Japanese: 限界突破!!「希望皇ホープレイ・ヴィクトリー」)	Gō Zappa	April 7, 2013	February 22, 2014
Yuma's conscience wakes up before a large Astral-shaped tower believed to be Astral's heart, facing danger due to Astral believing Yuma had betrayed him. Meanwhile, Astral, in control of the Dark ZEXAL, summons a Dark ZEXAL weapon, Chimera Clad, to power up Utopia Ray V and deal damage to Vector, who activates a trap locking them in an eternal loop. Yuma arrives before Astral, who is becoming enveloped by the power of evil, and embraces him, forcing them out of the Dark ZEXAL union and ending the battle before he loses all of their life points. Vector uses Barian's Force to evolve Masquerade into Chaos Number 104: Umbral Horror Masquerade, though Yuma manages to defend himself by discarding Utopia Ray V and resummoning Utopia, as well as taking advantage of the cards Vector sent to his Graveyard. Regaining their bonds, Yuma and Astral fuse into a new ZEXAL form, ZEXAL II. Then, Yuma uses his new powers to change Limited Barian's Force into Rank-Up-Magic Numeron Force, and evolve Utopia into Chaos Number 39: Utopia Ray Victory, defeating Vector. ZEXAL II's appearance causes Sargasso to self-destruct, forcing Mizar and Dumon to postpone their respective duels and retreat alongside Vector, while Yuma and the others return to Heartland City.
