= Yu-Gi-Oh! Zexal season 3 =

Yu-Gi-Oh! Zexal
- Season 3
- Official DVD cover of Yu-Gi-Oh! Zexal episodes 61–73
- No. of episodes: 24

Release
- Original network: TV Tokyo
- Original release: April 9 – September 24, 2012

Season chronology
- ← Previous; Season 2 Next → Yu-Gi-Oh! Zexal II; Season 4

Yu-Gi-Oh! Zexal (遊☆戯☆王 ZEXAL (ゼアル), Yūgiō Zearu) is the third spin-off anime series in the Yu-Gi-Oh! franchise and the sixth anime series overall. It is by Nihon Ad Systems and broadcast on TV Tokyo. It is directed by Satoshi Kuwahara and animated by Studio Gallop. The series aired in Japan on TV Tokyo between April 11, 2011, and September 24, 2012. A second series, Yu-Gi-Oh! Zexal II, began airing from October 7, 2012. The show also premiered on Toonzai in North America on October 15, 2011. The story follows the young duelist Yuma Tsukumo who partners up with an ethereal spirit named Astral, as they search for the 100 Number Duel Monsters cards, which will restore Astral's memories.

Six pieces of theme music are used for the series: three opening and three ending themes. For episodes 1–25, the opening theme is "Masterpiece" (マスターピース, Masutāpīsu) by mihimaru GT while the ending theme is "My Quest" (僕クエスト, Boku Kuesuto) by Golden Bomber. For episode 26–49, the opening theme is "Braving!" (ブレイビング!, Bureibingu!) by Kanan while the ending theme is "Freesia of Longing" (切望のフリージア, Setsubō no Furījia) by DaizyStripper. For episodes 50–73, the opening theme is "Soul Drive" (魂ドライブ, Tamashī Doraibu) by Color Bottle while the ending theme is "Wild Child" (ワイルドチャイルド, Wairudo Chairudo) by Moumoon. For the 4Kids and Konami English dub versions, the opening theme is "Take a Chance" for all episodes.

== Episode list ==
No. overall	No. in season	English dub title / Japanese translated title	Written by	Original release date	American air date
50	1	"Party Panic" / "The Eve of the Storm! The Diabolical Duelist Vetrix Appears!"; Transliteration: "Haran no Enyasa! Sugata o Arawashita Akuma no Dyuerisuto Toron" (Japanese: 波乱の前夜祭！姿を現した悪魔の決闘者・トロン)	Yasuyuki Suzuki	April 9, 2012	February 23, 2013
Yuma and his friends, along with the other finalists, are invited to a special event for the World Duel Carnival. Yuma has trouble getting in when he forgets his invitation, but is allowed in by Nistro. During the events, many conversations are occur between the finalists, which include Kite, Shark, Quattro, Quinton, Nistro, and Dextra. As the party goes on, Mr. Heartland's speech is interrupted by the arrival of Vetrix, who tells the competition his intentions of crushing them. He then glances at Astral, who is hovering above Yuma and adds, "Or maybe one of you." Astral gets spooked by Vetrix, who lets him know that he (Vetrix) can see Astral, before disappearing. The party is soon plunged into chaos following Flip's attempt to sneak into the party himself. After the party, Yuma has a brief talk with Kite, who was really talking to Astral, while Quinton hires a group of duelists known as the Triad of Terror to target Yuma.
51	2	"Roller Duel" / "Head to the Finals! The Duel Coaster is Ready to GO!"; Transliteration: "Ikuza Kesshō Taikai! Dyueru Kōsutā de GO!" (Japanese: 行くぜ決勝大会！デュエル・コースターでGO！)	Tsutomu Kamishiro	April 16, 2012	March 2, 2013
The day of the WDC finals comes, with finalists set to duel on a Duel Coaster for the knockout phase. However, Yuma ends up leaving the Heart Piece required to start the Duel Coaster at home. Tori and the others manage to get the piece to Yuma, though Tori trips and ends up going on the Duel Coaster with Yuma. As the other duelists progress, Yuma is challenged to a 3-on-1 duel against the Triad of Terror.
52	3	"Roller Coaster Rampage!" / "The Duel Coaster VS The Roaring Express"; Transliteration: "Dyueru Kōsutā VS Bakusō Ressha!!" (Japanese: デュエル・コースターVS爆走列車!!)	Tsutomu Kamishiro	April 23, 2012	March 9, 2013
As Yuma struggles against the combined attacks of the Triad of Terror, Anna appears and joins the fight against them. As Anna soon finds herself in danger, Nistro also appears on the scene to help them out, knocking out Coyote. Yuma then overlays his, Anna's and Nistro's monsters to summon One-Eyed Skill Gainer, defeating Jackal. As the leader, Wolfsbane, makes a desperate attack on Yuma, Anna intercepts the attack and is knocked out, allowing Yuma to knock Wolfsbane out before he collides with him.
53	4	"Test Your Luck!" / "The Fated Rail: Try Your Luck On A Trap Card!?"; Transliteration: "Unmei no Rēru, Wana Kādo de Un Tameshi!?" (Japanese: 運命のレール 罠カードで運試し!?)	Tsutomu Kamishiro	April 30, 2012	March 16, 2013
As the duelists move onto a new area, Nistro challenges Quinton and Dextra tries to get as many life points as possible in order to face Vetrix whilst Yuma ends up losing more life points after carelessly running into traps. As Quinton prepares to defeat Nistro, Yuma, who had managed to regain some life points on a gamble trap card, steps in to protect Nistro before taking him to the same trap card so he can try to regain some life points too. As the duelists are dwindled down to the last eight, Dextra steps in to face against Vetrix in the Jungle Field.
54	5	"Welcome to the Jungle" / "Vetrix VS Dextra: The Deadly Butterfly's Invitation! A Life-or-Death Jungle Field"; Transliteration: "Toron VS Dorowa: Shishō no Sasoi! Inochigake no Jangaru Fīrudo" (Japanese: トロンVSドロワ 死蝶の誘い！命懸けのヂャンガルフィールド)	Yasuyuki Suzuki	May 7, 2012	March 23, 2013
The duel between Vetrix and Dextra begins, with Dextra seemingly having the advantage due to her increased life points and field advantage, instantly bringing out her Photon Papilloperative and setting up a powerful spell combo. She recalls how she trained with Kite and eventually fell in love with him, wanting to protect him as he protected his little brother, Hart. As Yuma and Tori arrive to spectate the duel, Vetrix summons out his Number card, Number 8: Heraldic King Genom-Heritage, using its abilities to turn Dextra's combo against her before using his powers on her to make her lose her will to fight. Yuma manages to bring Dextra back to her senses, as she summons Photon Alexandra Queen in an attempt to bring the duel to a draw, but Vetrix manages to negate her attack and defeat her, using his powers to take away her memories of Kite. Before leaving, Vetrix tells Yuma that he will be ready for him. Yuma is determine to get Vetrix for what he has done.
55	6	"Portal of Doom" / "Galaxy-Eyes Sealed!? A Cosmic-Class Number Appears!"; Transliteration: "Gyarakushīaizu Fūin!? Uchū-kyū Nanbāzu Arawaru!" (Japanese: ギャラクシー・アイズ封印!? 宇宙級ナンバーズあらわる！)	Shin Yoshida	May 14, 2012	March 30, 2013
Returning to the Duel Coaster, Yuma and Tori run into Orbital 7, who leads them to the Space Field where Kite and Quinton are dueling. Quinton summons out his Number, Number 9: Dyson Sphere, which Kite is unable to see or attack. As Yuma arrives on the scene, Quinton reveals how his father, Byron Arclight, joined Dr. Faker, revealed to be Kite's father, and Kazuma on an expedition to find a gate to a new world. However, Faker betrayed Kazuma and Byron in order to activate the gate, sending them to another world. It is then revealed that Byron eventually returned in the form of Vetrix, while Kazuma was trapped in Astral World. As the duel resumes, Kite summons Galaxy-Eyes Photon Dragon while Quinton reveals Dyson Sphere's true form.
56	7	"Cosmic Chaos" / "The Great Decisive Battle of Outer Space! Neo Galaxy-Eyes' Counterattack"; Transliteration: "Uchū Daisakusen! Neo Gyarakushīaizu no Gyakushū" (Japanese: 宇宙大決戦！ネオ・ギャラクシーアイズの逆襲)	Shin Yoshida	May 21, 2012	April 6, 2013
Quinton explains how, after becoming separated from his family, he met Kite and became his instructor, meaning he knows quite a lot about Kite's strategy. Quinton soon manages to destroy Galaxy-Eyes and bring Kite's life points down to 100. Unwilling to give up, Kite manages to draw a spell card given to him by his father, allowing him to summon Neo Galaxy-Eyes Photon Dragon and win the duel. After the duel Quinton asks Kite to help save his father before leaving, before leaving his Number behind. Upon returning home, the power of his crest is broken and he collapses and falls into a coma, just like Trey.
57	8	"Depths of Darkness" / "Shark Torpedoed! The Nightmarish Fan Service"; Transliteration: "Shāku Gekisan! Akumu no Fansābisu" (Japanese: シャーク撃沈！悪夢のファンサービス)	Tsutomu Kamishiro	May 28, 2012	April 13, 2013
Yuma and Tori arrive at the Magma Field where Shark and Quattro have begun their duel. Shark summons his Aero Shark whilst Quattro defeats it with his Giant Grinder. Just then, Shark summons the Number card he got from Trey, Shark Drake, and defeats Giant Grinder. Just then, Vetrix appears, revealing his plan, which included having Quattro push Shark into a trap and hurt his sister, is for the sake of pushing Shark heart's into darkness so he can be controlled into taking down Faker. Not willing to accept that he is not chosen to take down Faker, Quattro summons Number 40: Gimmick Puppet of Strings, using it to repeatedly attack Shark while Yuma stands helpless, taunted by Vetrix.
58	9	"Swimming With Sharks" / "Shark Reawakens! A New Chaos Number Appears"; Transliteration: "Shāku Kakusei! Aratanaru Kaosu Nanbāzu Arawaru" (Japanese: シャーク覚醒！新たなるカオス・ナンバーズあらわる)	Tsutomu Kamishiro	June 4, 2012	April 20, 2013
As Shark becomes weak from Quattro's attack, Shark Drake once again attempts to put him under his influence, but Shark continues to reject him. As Quattro is shunned by Vetrix, he sacrifices Strings so he can bring out a new Number card, Number 88: Gimmick Puppet of Leo, which will guarantee his victory once its Overlay Units are used up. However, Vetrix manipulates Shark into giving into the darkness of the Number, gaining the power to evolve Shark Drake into Chaos Number 32: Shark Drake Veiss and defeat Quattro. After the duel, Quattro explains how a spell card he received from Vetrix ended up hurting Shark's sister, but he managed to save her life, apologizing for his actions before leaving.
59	10	"Rockin' and Rollin'" / "A Fierce Fight! Yuma VS Nistro: This is my Dueling Soul"; Transliteration: "Gekisen! Yūma VS Gōshu Kore ga Ore no Dyueru Tamashii" (Japanese: 激戦！遊馬VSゴーシュ これがオレのデュエル魂)	Yoshifumi Fukushima	June 11, 2012	April 27, 2013
Yuma finally arrives at the Dangerous Canyon Field to face Nistro although, after all the traps he had run into on the way, he only has 100 life points, not helped by the field magic which damages players for summoning and attacking with monsters. However, Nistro activates a trap which restores Yuma's life points so he can have a fair fight with him. The fight soon gets underway, with Yuma bringing out his Gagaga Cowboy and Nistro, annoyed with Yuma playing defensively, bringing out his Heroic Champion - Kusanagi. Realising that he has not been fighting at his all, Yuma decides to get more serious and the duel soon culminates in a showdown between Utopia and Heroic Champion - Excalibur which ends in Yuma's victory. After the duel, Nistro gives Yuma his Excalibur to take with him to the semi-finals.
60	11	"Doctor Visit" / "Prelude to the Ultimate Decisive Battle: A New Enemy, Dr. Faker"; Transliteration: "Kessen-he no Jyoshō Aratanaru Teki Dokutā Feikā" (Japanese: 決戦への序章 新たなる敵Dr.フェイカー)	Yoshifumi Fukushima	June 18, 2012	May 4, 2013
As Yuma celebrates reaching the finals, he realises he has misplaced his deck within Heartland. As Yuma, Tori, and Bronk sneak into Heartland through the trash system, Vetrix manages to capture Shark and use his powers to brainwash him. As they reach Heartland Tower, Astral informs Yuma that Hart is somewhere in the building. Upon coming up against a Security Bot who poses a puzzle based challenge to them, Tori and Bronk take it on whilst Yuma and Astral push ahead. As Yuma and Astral go to see Hart, who is still unconscious from his encounter with Vetrix, Hart brings them into the world in his mind, asking them to help Kite. Just then, Dr. Faker appears before them, revealing his intention to gather Numbers in order to obtain a special power, before sending Yuma away, returning his deck. As the day of the WDC Semi-Finals come, Yuma is set to face off against Shark.
61	12	"Duel of Destiny: Part 1" / "The Disappearing Bonds! Yuma VS Shark, the Fated Duel!!"; Transliteration: "Kiekaketa Kizuna! Yūma VS Shāku, Shukumei no Dyueru!!" (Japanese: 消えかけた絆！遊馬VSシャーク、宿命の決闘！！)	Tsutomu Kamishiro	June 25, 2012	May 11, 2013
The semi-final match between Yuma and Shark begins, and instantly Yuma can tell something is wrong with Shark as he makes no attempt to defend against Yuma's attacks. Just then, Shark starts to writhe in pain as Vetrix manipulates him into turning against Dr. Faker and Yuma, believing they were responsible for what happened to his sister. Shark soon bears the mark of Vetrix's power and launches a fierce counter attack against Yuma before bringing out Shark Drake.
62	13	"Duel of Destiny: Part 2" / "Shark's Back! The Bonds Connected by "Feeling the Flow!""; Transliteration: "Yomigaere Shāku! Kizuna ni Kaketa "Kattobingu!"" (Japanese: 蘇れシャーク！絆に懸けた「かっとビング！」)	Tsutomu Kamishiro	July 2, 2012	May 18, 2013
As Yuma manages to survive Shark Drake's attack, Yuma tries to get Shark to remember the duels they've had together to no avail. Shark then brings out Shark Drake Veiss, with Yuma barely managing to survive its attack. Yuma then summons Utopia and uses a trap to take control of Shark Drake Veiss, freeing Shark from its influence but taking on the darkness himself. Vetrix pushes Shark to use a trap that would lead him to win, but free Yuma from his suffering, pushing Yuma to decide if he should save Shark or Astral. Hearing Yuma's words of friendship, Shark activates a spell that removes Shark Drake Veiss from the game and deals himself damage, saving Yuma and making him the winner.
63	14	"The Hart of the Matter" / "The Scheme of a Horrifying Darkness! Vetrix's True Form Is Revealed!?"; Transliteration: "Osorubeki Yami no Sakuryaku! Abakareta Toron no Shōtai!?" (Japanese: 恐るべき闇の策略！暴かれたトロンの正体!?)	Yasuyuki Suzuki	July 9, 2012	May 25, 2013
As the match between Kite and Vetrix begins, Yuma decides to get on the stadium for a closer look. Kite instantly summons out Galaxy-Eyes Photon Dragon, though soon starts to feel the effects of using Photon Transformation too long. As Vetrix reveals his means of revenge, Kite summons the Dyson Sphere he got from Quinton, using its Overlay Units to power up Galaxy-Eyes for a direct attack, but Vetrix manages to survive it. Vetrix then takes off his mask, revealing Hart's face, revealing he is linked to Hart as a result of absorbing his power, allowing him to cause pain to him. As Yuma and Orbital 7 decide to head to Hart's side, Vetrix summons Genom-Heritage, using its abilities to destroy Dyson Sphere.
64	15	"Change of Hart" / "Roar, Neo Galaxy-Eyes! The Brothers' Bond that Shatters the Darkness"; Transliteration: "Neo Gyarakushīaizu Hōkō!! Yami o Kudaku Kyōdai no Kizuna!" (Japanese: ネオギャラクシーアイズ咆哮！ 闇を砕く兄弟の絆！)	Yasuyuki Suzuki	July 16, 2012	June 1, 2013
As Vetrix continues to torment Kite, Yuma and Astral manages to break into Hart's room and once again enter the world of his mind, where they discover it being overrun by a dark energy controlled by part of Vetrix's consciousness. Using the power of Utopia, Yuma manage to defeat Vetrix's presence, destroying Vetrix's link to Hart. Kite then summons out Neo Galaxy-Eyes Photon Dragon and manages to destroy Genom-Heritage, but Vetrix manages to survive his attack. Vetrix then reveals his true ace monster, Number 69: Heraldry Crest, which is fueled by rage, using its power to steal Neo Galaxy-Eyes' abilities and defeat Kite. As Vetrix prepares to make an additional strike (even though he had already won the duel), Hart shows up and uses his power to protect Kite. Vetrix is declared the winner and he takes all of Kite's Numbers and his soul, as well as Hart's soul.
65	16	"Sphere of Fear: Part 1" / "An All-Out War Between Numbers! Yuma VS Vetrix! The Surprising Duel in a Super-Strange Space"; Transliteration: "Nanbāzu Sōryokusen! Yūma VS Toron! Kyōi Chōikūkan Dyueru!" (Japanese: ナンバーズ総力戦！ 遊馬VSトロン！驚異の超異空間デュエル！)	Shin Yoshida	July 23, 2012	June 15, 2013
The final match between Yuma and Vetrix begins, taking place in a Sphere Field of Dr. Faker's design, allowing them to freely summon random Numbers. As Vetrix states how the power of the crests took Trey, Quattro, and Quinton's souls when they lost, he implies that Kazuma is using Astral as a means to get revenge on the world, though Yuma chooses to believe in Astral. As the match progresses, Vetrix summons out Genom-Heritage, along with the Illumiknight and Acid Golem he retrieved from Kite, while Yuma summons Utopia, Terror-Byte, and Leviathan Dragon.
66	17	"Sphere of Fear: Part 2" / "The Terrifying Duel! Arise, Hero of Bonds, ZEXAL!"; Transliteration: "Senritsu no Dyueru! Tachiagare Kizuna no Eiyū Zearu!!!" (Japanese: 戦慄のデュエル！立ち上がれ絆の英雄ゼアル!!!)	Shin Yoshida	July 30, 2012	June 22, 2013
Using his Numbers, Yuma manages to defeat Vetrix's trio of Numbers. However, Vetrix soon summons out Heraldry Crest and takes off his mask, revealing his true nature. Reminding Vetrix about his family, Yuma and Astral perform ZEXAL, bringing out Utopia Ray and equipping it with a new Zexal Weapon - Lightning Blade.
67	18	"Sphere of Fear: Part 3" / "Believe in Victory! The Final Shining Draw!"; Transliteration: "Shōri wo Shinjite! Fainaru Shainingu Dorō!" (Japanese: 勝利を信じて！ファイナル・シャイニング・ドロー！)	Shin Yoshida	August 13, 2012	June 29, 2013
Yuma is brought down to 50 Life Points, but he regains his energy after eating the snack Tori gave him, which Astral also gets to try thanks to the ZEXAL bond. He then summons the Zexal Weapon - Tornado Bringer, but Vetrix activates a trap which seeks to finish off Yuma at the end of his turn. However, Yuma manages to summon his Zexal Weapons to the field and overlay them to Xyz summon the Zexal Weapon - Leo Arms, allowing Utopia to negate the effects of Heraldry Crest and destroy it, defeat Vetrix and win the championship. Just then, Faker reveals the true purpose of the Sphere Field, to steal all of Yuma and Vetrix's Numbers. Their numbers are taken by the Sphere Field, while Vetrix fails to destroy the Sphere Field with his Crest. As a vortex threatens to suck both Yuma and Vetrix in, Vetrix comes to understand Yuma's words of friendship and relinquishes all the souls he had stolen before allowing himself to fall into the vortex. Yuma is then brought before Faker, who laughs maniacally at Yuma and Astral.
68	19	"The Countdown Begins" / "Prelude to Ruin: The Threat of the Sphere Field Cannon!"; Transliteration: "Hōkai he no Jyokyoku Sufia Fīrudo Hō no Kyōi!" (Japanese: 崩壊への序曲 スフィア・フィールド砲の脅威！)	Tsutomu Kamishiro	August 20, 2012	July 6, 2013
Faker reveals he plans to use Hart to launch the Sphere Field with Yuma in it into space, using the power of the Numbers to destroy Astral World. As Heartland Tower crumbles, Tori rushes in, where she encounters Kite under some rubble, managing to free him with help from Shark. Desiring to save both Yuma and Hart, Shark, Kite, and Tori join forces and head to where Yuma is. They are soon confronted by Mr. Heartland who sends endless waves of robots to stave them off. However, Orbital manages to hack into the power system, stopping the robots and delaying the cannon launch, although he ends up shutting himself down in the process. Astral then splits from Yuma and stays behind to help him escape the Sphere Field, leaving behind Utopia and Shark Drake. As Faker appears in person, Yuma, Shark, and Kite unite to confront him for one final duel.
69	20	"A Trio's Challenge: Part 1" / "The Three Heroes Unite, One Last Duel For The Future!"; Transliteration: "Tsudoishi San Yūshi, Mirai wo Kaketa Rasuto Dyueru!" (Japanese: 集いし三勇士(さんゆうし)、 未来を賭けたラストデュエル！)	Shin Yoshida	August 27, 2012	July 13, 2013
As Faker reveals his true form as a cyborg, he summons out the powerful Number 53: Heart-eartH. Yuma manages to summon Utopia and deal some damage, but Heart-eartH's effect causes Yuma to take some damage himself. Shark, plagued by an injury he received whilst fighting off the robots, then summons out Shark Drake, dealing damage whilst also receiving some. Kite then summons out Galaxy-Eyes Photon Dragon, but starts feeling the effects of his Photon Transformation. He manages to overcome the damaging effects of Heart-eartH though and is able to destroy it. However, Faker avoids defeat and brings out a new force, Number 92: Heart-eartH Dragon.
70	21	"A Trio's Challenge: Part 2" / "The Most Evil, Horrifying Dragon Appears! The False Skeletal God Dragon, Heart-eartH Dragon"; Transliteration: "Senritsu no Saikyōryū Arawaru! Gigaishinryū Hātoāsu Doragon" (Japanese: 戦慄の最凶龍現る！偽骸神龍ハートアース・ドラゴン)	Shin Yoshida	September 3, 2012	July 20, 2013
After barely managing to survive Heart-eartH Dragon's attack, Yuma brings out Utopia Ray and manages to damage Faker, but it is soon removed by Heart-eartH's effects. Shark then brings out Shark Drake Veiss, but Faker manages to reverse its attack to regain life points. Before reeling from his injuries, Shark manages to take advantage of Heart-eartH's ability to give Kite what he needs to summon out Neo Galaxy-Eyes Photon Dragon. Kite manages to destroy Heart-eartH Dragon and deal massive damage to Faker. Faker then reveals that in order to cure Hart's condition, he was told by Barian World to destroy Astral World, with everything he had done up til now being for the purpose of saving Hart. Hearing this, Kite decides he will team up with Yuma and Shark and take on the Barian World and save Hart with his own hands. Just then, an evil being from Barian World, Vector, possesses Faker and brings back Number 92: Heart-eartH Dragon, using its own special ability.
71	22	"A Trio's Challenge: Part 3" / "The Miraculous Feeling the Flow! ZEXAL, Open The Path to the Future!!"; Transliteration: "Kiseki no Kattobingu! Mirai wo Kirihirake, Zearu!!" (Japanese: 奇跡のかっとビング！未来を切り開けゼアル!!)	Shin Yoshida	September 10, 2012	July 27, 2013
Kite manages to defend against Vector's attack, but both he and Shark start reeling from their injuries. As Hart notices the pain Kite and Yuma are going through, he activates his power and weakens the Sphere Field, allowing Yuma to reunite with Astral and use ZEXAL. Summoning the Zexal Weapon - Ultimate Shield, Yuma brings back everyone's monsters and power up Utopia Ray, allowing him to destroy Heart-eartH Dragon and defeat Vector, expelling him from Faker's body. However, Vector vows that they will pay, before vanishing. As the place starts to self-destruct and Faker falls down a hole leading towards another dimension, Kite and Yuma head down after him to try and save him, where they are suddenly confronted by Vetrix, who uses the last of his power to bring everyone to safety. Having been entitled to any wish for winning the WDC, Yuma decides to have a duel with Kite to finally settle things.
72	23	"Kite's Plight: Part 1" / "The Time For The Showdown!! Yuma VS Kite, The True Finals of the World Duel Carnival"; Transliteration: "Shiyūkessuru Toki!! Yūma VS Kaito, Wārudo Dyeru Kānibaru Mō Hitotsu no Kesshūsen!" (Japanese: 雌雄決する時！！遊馬VSカイト、WDCもう一つの決勝戦！)	Yasuyuki Suzuki	September 17, 2012	August 3, 2013
As the duel between Yuma and Kite begins, it is revealed Tori, Shark, and Kite are able to see Astral's presence. Kite immediately summons out Galaxy-Eyes Photon Dragon, which Yuma manages to destroy using Utopia. Feeling he has lost his purpose of dueling, Kite prepares to surrender the duel, but Astral explains to him about Yuma's purpose of dueling: to make friends. Hearing this, along with encouragement from Yuma, Kite resumes the duel.
73	24	"Kite's Plight: Part 2" / "The Illusive Great Clash!! Double Utopia VS Double Galaxy-Eyes!!"; Transliteration: "Maboroshi no Daigekitō!! Daburu Hōpu VS Daburu Garakushī Aizu!!" (Japanese: 幻の大激突！！ダブル希望皇VSダブル銀河眼！！)	Yasuyuki Suzuki	September 24, 2012	August 10, 2013
Kite summons the Xyz monster Starliege Paladynamo and manages to destroy Utopia, but Yuma manages to beat it with the Heroic Champion Excalibur he received from Nistro. Kite soon resummons Galaxy-Eyes, while Yuma summons Utopia Ray, but Kite manages to survive his attack by utilizing his own Spell card against him. Kite then brings out Neo Galaxy-Eyes Photon Dragon, which destroys itself with Utopia. Yuma activates a spell to revive Utopia and Utopia Ray, but Kite manages to use the same spell to revive Galaxy-Eyes and Neo Galaxy-Eyes and win the duel. After making a vow to one day beat Kite, Yuma takes a well earned nap. Meanwhile, in Barian World, a group of 4 Barian Emperors plot against Yuma and Astral, with Dumon telling his subordinates that since Yuma and Astral were a lot stronger than they thought, they will now have to intervene directly.
