= List of Yu-Gi-Oh! GX characters =

This is the list of characters in the Yu-Gi-Oh! GX animated series. The official English anime and the English manga by VIZ Media have changed the names of the characters.

== Main characters ==
Jaden Yuki / Judai Yuki (遊城 十代, Yūki Jūdai)
Voiced by: KENN (Japanese); Matthew Charles (English)
The main protagonist of the series. An energetic, passionate and optimistic boy who comes to Duel Academy to learn to become the new King of Games, he is a talented duelist who beats some of the toughest duelists, including Professor Crowler and Chazz Princeton/Jun Manjoume. Despite his excellence in dueling, he is placed in the Slifer Red dormitory due to his below average grades and general disinterest in anything that is not duel-related.
In the first season, Jaden's excellence in dueling leads him to become one of the Spirit Key holders, a responsibility given to the best duelists in the school to guard the Spirit Keys from the Shadow Riders who seek to resurrect the Sacred Beasts. In the second season, Jaden fights against the Society of Light, a cult like organization that seeks to brainwash the world, and is revealed to possess Gentle Darkness, a power that was created to balance out the light. The Gentle Darkness also gives Jaden special powers such as the ability to communicate with Duel Spirits, most often with Winged Kuriboh, a card he received from Yugi Muto on the day of his entrance exam. In the third season, Jaden and his friends are transported to an alternate dimension where duel monsters are real. While there, Jaden falls into despair after seeing his friends sacrificed and becomes possessed by the Supreme King, a ruthless and merciless ruler and the original wielder of the Gentle Darkness. After being released from his possession, Jaden learns that he is the reincarnation of the Supreme King and that Yubel, a duel Monster that was the Supreme King's guardian and the mastermind behind the alternate dimension, is bound to the Supreme King by prophecy. In order to fulfill the prophecy and cleanse Yubel of her corruption caused by the light, Jaden decides to fuse himself with Yubel, gaining the powers of both the Supreme King and Yubel and possessing the ability to bring duel monsters to life, see visions of the future, resist supernatural powers such as hypnosis, and generate wind. He is described as someone who is "not human." Afterwards, Jaden's original happy and easygoing personality turns serious and aloof, as he no longer finds dueling fun and wishes to only duel when he needs to, and finds himself trying to distance himself from others after bearing guilt for the misfortunes his friends and others endured. In the fourth season, Jaden battles against Nightshroud, who preys on people's negative emotions and wishes to engulf humanity into his Darkness Realm, and begins to return to his old personality with the help of his friends and Yugi Mutou, who he gets to duel.
He specializes in using Fusion Monsters, his main deck being the Elemental Heroes, monsters based on comic superheroes with his signature being "Elemental Hero Flame Wingman." Jaden later switches decks to a "Neo-Spacian"-based one, monsters based on alien creatures drawn by Jaden when he was younger which use contact fusion, fusion without the need of a fusion card, to fuse "Elemental Hero Neos", his new signature card, and create a new Fusion monster. He later combines the two decks together.
Syrus Truesdale / Sho Marufuji (丸藤 翔, Marufuji Shō)
Voiced by: Masami Suzuki (Japanese); Wayne Grayson (English)
Jaden's roommate and friend at Duel Academy. He often doubts himself, living in the shadow of his older brother Zane, but has shown himself to be a talented duelist, managing to rise in the ranks from Slifer Red to Ra Yellow to Obelisk Blue. He battles using a Vehicroid deck which consists of monsters related to machinery or vehicles. His deck also possesses "Power Bond", a powerful fusion card given to him by Zane which he initially was scared of.
Chumley Huffington / Hayato Maeda (前田 隼人, Maeda Hayato)
Voiced by: Takehiro Hasu (Japanese); Ted Lewis (1-50), Tom Wayland (85) (English)
A portly student who is described as large and intimidating, like a bear, but is lazy and "has the energy of a sloth". He had to repeat his freshman year, but becomes more confident with Jaden's encouragement. He is associated with Silfer Red, but later leaves Duel Academy in order to work at Industrial Illusions as a card designer. He uses a beast deck based on Australia.
Bastion Misawa / Daichi Misawa (三沢 大地, Misawa Daichi)
Voiced by: Yūki Masuda (Japanese); Eric Stuart (English)
A duelist associated with Ra Yellow and is regarded as a dueling genius, having the top grades of his freshman applicant class. His strength is in studying and preparing for different situations, relying on rational methods. He possesses six carefully calculated decks for each Monster attribute; he claims that a single carelessly added card can throw off their balance. He is good friends with Jaden despite their very different personalities and is seen to view Jaden as a worthy rival. Bastion's decks are all based around a single attribute and usually contain monsters, spells, and traps related to Science or Math such as "Water Dragon" or "Magnet Warrior".
Chazz Princeton / Jun Manjoume (万丈目 準, Manjōme Jun)
Voiced by: Taiki Matsuno (Japanese); Tony Salerno (1-89), Marc Thompson (90-155) (English)
A freshman duelist who ranks in the Obelisk Blue and one of Jaden's rivals. He is elitist, thinking that low-scoring duelists such as Jaden should be kicked out. It is revealed early in the first season that his elitism stems from his older brothers, who rule over the political and financial worlds and urge him to become a great duelist in order to have their family reign over the dueling world. After becoming estranged with his brothers, Chazz decides to pursue a career in dueling without their help. Initially hating Jaden, he comes to respect and befriend Jaden, seeing him as his rival, and develops a crush on Alexis (Asuka). He initially uses a power based deck, focusing on powerful monsters such as the Armed Dragons. Later on, he becomes able to see duel spirits and starts using the Ojama Trio, a trio of brothers with zero attack points but several uses. His self-imposed nickname in the English version is "The Chazz" while his Japanese nickname is "Manjoume Thunder," derived from the phrase "It's Manjoume-san!" ("Manjōme-san da!"). Chazz's deck has changed the most out of the duelists. He initially played with a "Chthonian" deck which consisted of dark fiends, which changes to a "VWXYZ" deck and later an "Armed Dragon" deck. Chazz then forms a bond with the "Ojama Trio" and changes his deck to be Ojama based. He later combines all the decks together to make his final and permanent deck.
Alexis Rhodes / Asuka Tenjoin (天上院 明日香, Tenjōin Asuka)
Voiced by: Sanae Kobayashi (Japanese); Priscilla Everett (1-23, 25), Anna Morrow (26-155) (English)
A beautiful and talented duelist who is regarded as the queen of the Obelisk Blue, but unlike many of the other Blue members, is not elitist and quickly takes interest in Jaden. She does not follow the crowd or regard herself as better than other people like some students in the dormitory, but has a stern pride as an Obelisk Blue duelist. Alexis is shown to be good friends with Zane Trusdale, as he was close friends with her brother Atticus until his disappearance and helped her search for clues surrounding his disappearance, until it is revealed that he joined the Shadow Riders under the control of Nightshroud. She is shown to be headstrong and independent as well as a good friend of Jaden, later revealed to have a crush on Jaden, which it is unknown if he reciprocates, and is aware of Chazz's crush on her. Alexis plays a "Cyber Girl" deck which consists of cards related to sports such as "Etoile Cyber" and "Cyber Blader." She later adds in Cyber Angel cards, ritual-based monsters based on the spirits and gods of Asian mythology.
Zane Truesdale / Ryo Marufuji (丸藤 亮, Marufuji Ryō)
Voiced by: Takeshi Maeda (Japanese); Scottie Ray (English)
A third-year Obelisk Blue student and the king of Duel Academy, nicknamed "Kaiser" in the Japanese version. He is the older brother of Syrus. He is the top duelist at the school and has reportedly never lost to someone on purpose, serving as one of Jaden's friendly rivals in the first season and the only student who has beaten Jaden in a duel. He is also good friends with Alexis and Atticus and helped her search for clues surrounding Atticus' disappearance. Since he is the top duelist, he was given the honor of choosing his partner in the graduation duel. He chooses Jaden and passes the title of top duelist to Jaden before leaving Duel Academy and joining the Pro-Dueling League. Originally a star in the Pro-Dueling League, he loses a duel against Aster Phoenix and slowly loses his winning streak and reputation. Looking for a chance to redeem himself, he begins dueling underground, which uses shock collars to punish losses, and develops a more aggressive and violent personality earning him the name "Hell Kaiser" in the Japanese version. While in the alternate dimension, Zane teams up with Aster to stop Yubel, but in his final battle, his heart gives out due to the shock collar, with his final wish being to let the Cyber End Dragon be his symbol and for Jaden to overcome his darkness. He is later revealed to have survived, but is in a weakened state. He uses a Cyber Dragon deck which consists primarily of different Cyber Dragons, with his signature being "Cyber End Dragon." He later acquires the Cyberdark deck to reflect his new personality, with his signature being "Cyberdark Dragon." He later combines these two decks, with Cyber End Dragon becoming his signature once again.
Blair Flannigan / Rei Saotome (早乙女 レイ, Saotome Rei)
Voiced by: Eri Sendai (Japanese); Lisa Ortiz (English)
First appearing in "The Maiden in Love", Blair Flannigan is a young girl who enrolls into Duel Academy disguised as a boy in hopes of getting close to Zane Truesdale, her crush. After being caught by Jaden while sneaking into Zane's dorm room, he defeats her in a duel and confesses her love to Zane, but is politely rejected due to her being in fifth grade. Afterwards, she leaves Duel Academy and turns her affections to Jaden, promising to return to Duel Academy and enroll when she is older. In "The Hands of Justice (Part 2)", she returns to Duel Academy in the midst of the GX Tournament to duel Zane, but is again rejected and is given his GX medal. Dueling Chazz in the final match, she is defeated but is accepted into Duel Academy after proving her worth as a duelist. Blair uses a deck of girls to sway her opponent's male monsters in the first season and later uses a deck of "Egg" monsters when she is reintroduced in the third season and enters Duel Academy now that she is old enough.
Tyranno Hassleberry / Tyranno Kenzan (ティラノ剣山)
Voiced by: Hiroshi Shimozaki (Japanese); David Wills (English)
A duelist who enrolls in Jaden's school during the second season and is grouped with Ra Yellow. He has a muscular physique and plays a Dinosaur deck. When he was younger, following an accident while hunting for fossils, scientists implanted a dinosaur bone in his leg. Hassleberry uses a Dinosaur Evolution deck.

== Recurring characters ==
Adrian Gecko / Amon Garam (アモン・ガラム, Amon Garamu)
Voiced by: Nobuya Mine, Saori Terai (young) (Japanese); Darren Dunstan (English)
A new student hailing from East Academy who enters Duel Academy in the third year. He carries a digi-recorder and is often seen taking notes on it. For most of his life, he has always put the needs of others ahead of himself. He was adopted by the Gecko family and was supposed to be the future heir until his brother was born; since then, he has devoted his time to help him despite getting less attention and being looked down upon. Adrian gets sent to another dimension by Yubel and tries to become king. He first duels using a cloud type deck, then obtains the full power of Exodia by sacrificing his childhood friend Echo and defeats Aster Phoenix in season 3. After losing a duel to Jesse possessed by Yubel, he gets sent to the stars and does not come back. Echo's spirit later aids Adrian in his duel against Jesse when he is possessed by Yubel, but ends up being used by Yubel only to regain his power when she feeds on the darkness in his soul and uses it to defeat Adrian. Following the Other Dimension arc, the other characters return to their own dimension, with the exception of Bastion, who chose to stay there, with Echo and Adrian's fates being unknown.
Aster Phoenix / Edo Phoenix (エド・フェニックス, Edo Fenikkusu)
Voiced by: Akira Ishida (Japanese); Asako Yoshida (young) Pete Zarustica (English)
A talented professional duelist who enters Duel Academy as a freshman during the second season. When he was young, his father was mysteriously killed (kidnapped in the dub) and he was taken in by Sartorius, being used as a pawn in his plans. Similar to Jaden's Elemental Hero deck, Aster uses a Destiny Hero deck, symbolizing his desire for vengeance.
Atticus Rhodes / Fubuki Tenjoin (天上院 吹雪, Tenjōin Fubuki)
Voiced by: Koji Yusa (Japanese); Jason Griffith (English)
His given name means "blizzard" in Japanese, from which he derives his self-appointed title, "Blizzard Prince" in the original version of the series. His signature is written as "Fubuki 10 Join". Atticus Rhodes is the missing brother of Alexis, and his disappearance is a driving motivation for Alexis during the first season of the series. He mainly uses a deck revolving around Red Eyes Black Dragon. In one episode, he used a Beast Warrior deck along with cards related to show business.
Axel Brodie / Austin O'Brien (オースチン・オブライエン, Ōsuchin Oburaien)
Voiced by: Naru Kawamoto (Japanese); Duane Cooper (English)
Initially Professor Viper's right-hand man introduced during the third season. He is described as being tough and having a "no-nonsense style and military upbringing". This is also referenced by his Duel Disk, which is in the shape of a gun that can shoot cards when needed. Axel uses the Volcanic deck. He eventually joins Jaden as one of his allies.
Fonda Fontaine / Emi Ayukawa (鮎川 恵美, Ayukawa Emi)
Voiced by: Michiko Neya (Japanese); Bella Hudson (episodes 3-52) Veronica Taylor (episodes 53-155) (English)
Fonda Fontaine is the supervisor of the female Obelisk Blue dormitory, as well as the school's head medic and gym instructor. During the third year, while trying to protect an injured Blair Flanagan, she is transformed into one of Marcel's Duel Ghouls and duels with Jaden, though she recovers after Duel Academy is returned to its proper place from an alternate dimension. Ms. Fontaine plays an Anti-Cure deck, which transforms effects intended to heal the opponent into ones that deal damage instead.
Jasmine / Junko Makita (枕田 ジュンコ, Makita Junko)
Voiced by: Mariko Nagahama (Japanese); Suzanne Goldish (English)
One of Alexis's boy crazy roommates in the female Obelisk Blue dormitory. She has almost no talent for dueling and would much rather gossip, shop, or fantasize about Atticus.
Jean Louis Bonaparte / Napoleon (ナポレオン, Naporeon)
Voiced by: Naoki Tatsuta (Japanese); Mike Pollock (English)
Vice-Chancellor of Duel Academy beginning with the second season, Bonaparte is a stout man hailing from Paris, France who originally attempted to demolish the Slifer Red dormitory at every opportunity, but was repelled by Dr. Crowler. He later dueled alongside Crowler against Maximillion Pegasus for a job at Industrial Illusions, after they falsely believed themselves to be fired by Chancellor Sheppard. Following Duel Academy's arrival in an alternate dimension, he encourages the students to save his son Marcel from the Duel Spirit Yubel. Previously married, Bonaparte's son is in the custody of his ex-wife. After Marcel is rescued, Bonaparte apologizes for neglecting him and leaving his wife for his career, and the two return to France at the end of the season. Bonaparte plays a Toy Army deck. His character is based on Napoleon I.
Jesse Anderson / Johan Andersen (ヨハン・アンデルセン, Yohan Anderusen)
Voiced by: Kanako Irie (Japanese); Christopher C. Adams (Note: On the English official website, Jesse Anderson is listed as being voiced by Eileen Stevens) (English)
A North Academy duelist described as loyal, friendly, and fun-loving, who becomes Jaden's friend and ally. He uses a Crystal Beast deck and searches for the Rainbow Dragon card, which he eventually acquires in season 3. He activates the card to take the Academy and the rest of the students back to their world, leaving him behind, where he is possessed by Yubel, but rescued by Jaden. In season 4, Jesse helps Jaden defeat Mr. T to save everyone and the world, and later attends the graduation party.
Jim "Crocodile" Cook (ジム・クロコダイル・クック, Jimu Kurokodairu Kukku)
Voiced by: Naoya Iwahashi (Japanese); Tom Wayland (English)
Introduced in the third season as an Australian duelist originally from South Academy, but now enrolled at Duel Academy. He is described as tough, cunning, but having a carefree attitude. He has a pet crocodile named Shirley (Karen in the Japanese version), who he saved when he was younger. He wears bandages over his right eye, which is revealed to house an Eye of Oricalcum that allows him to see a person's true nature. He uses his power to try to free Jaden from the Supreme King, but fails and is sent to the stars before being rescued. He duels using a fossil deck and his duel disk resembles a boomerang.
Lyman Banner / Professor Daitokuji (大徳寺先生, Daitokuji-sensei)
Voiced by: Kappei Yamaguchi (Japanese); Wayne Grayson (English)
The head of Slifer Red in Duel Academy who, in the Japanese version, often speaks with 'nyaa' at the end of his sentences. He is later revealed to be an alchemist who used a homunculus body to prolong his life and joined the Shadow Riders in order to seek out the Three Sacred Beasts. When he is defeated by Jaden, his body dissolves into dust, but his spirit remains with Jaden, offering him advice whenever possible.
Mindy / Momoe Hamaguchi (浜口 ももえ, Hamaguchi Momoe)
Voiced by: Tomomi Taniuchi (Japanese); Lisa Ortiz (English)
One of Alexis's boy crazy roommates in the female Obelisk Blue dormitory. She has almost no talent for dueling and would much rather gossip, shop, or fantasize about Atticus.
Ms. Dorothy / Tome (トメ)
Voiced by: Mariko Nagahama (Japanese); Lisa Ortiz (English)
A school staff member who works in Duel Academia's card shop, who actually has very little knowledge of the rules of a Duel. In the English version, she is "Miss Duel Academy." There is an ongoing romance between her and Chancellor Sheppard.
Sartyr / Kabayama (樺山)
Voiced by: Ryuichi Nagashima (Japanese); Marc Thompson (English)
The head professor of Ra Yellow. The other characters do not recognize him immediately, and he is lonely due to most of his students either being promoted to Obelisk Blue or staying with Jaden at Slifer Red. Despite this, Sartyr points out through a series of flashbacks that he had been a background character in several episodes in the first season as an in-joke about his character not being noticed. Sartyr plays a Spice deck. In the English version, he bears the alias Don Simon, and in the Japanese version his alias is Curry Mask (カレー仮面, Karē Kamen).
Sheppard / Samejima (鮫島)
Voiced by: Masami Iwasaki (Japanese); David Wills (English)
The chancellor of Duel Academy, who watches over the students in his school but is often directly responsible, though not always fully aware of it, for many of the incidents that befall Jaden and co. In the second season, Sheppard left Duel Academy under the care of Crowler, and was sought by Zane, who wanted to obtain the Underworld deck that lay dormant within his dojo. He eventually resumed his position in time for the GX tournament, part of a plot devised by both himself and Pegasus to lure out the person possessing the famed Ultimate Destiny Card. Sheppard plays a Cyber-Style deck.
Vellian Crowler / Cronos de Medici (クロノス・デ・メディチ, Kuronosu de Medichi)
Voiced by: Hiroshi Shimizu (Japanese); Sean Schemmel (English)
A teacher at Duel Academy, and the head of its Obelisk Blue group. He is very strict, believing that weaker students who cannot keep up with his lessons should quit or be expelled. He especially dislikes Jaden, having been defeated by him during the latter's entrance exam. However, his attempts to show up or expel Jaden have only humiliated himself and his followers, while making Jaden look better. Crowler eventually appreciates his students and in turn is respected for his noble actions. Crowler plays an Ancient Gear deck.

== Antagonists ==
=== The Shadow Riders ===
The Shadow Riders / Seven Stars Assassins (セブンスターズ刺客, Sebunsutāzu Shikaku) are composed of seven duelists and their leader of varying origins and backgrounds, who each have their own agendas. The Shadow Riders are intent on resurrecting the Three Sacred Beasts (Phantom Demons in the Japanese version).

Kagemaru (影丸)
Voiced by: Nobutoshi Canna (younger), Mugihito (older) (Japanese); Marc Thompson (younger), David Wills (older) (English)
Kagemaru is the former superintendent of Duel Academy and current leader of the Shadow Riders, serving as the main antagonist of the series' first season. The "Kage" portion of his name is derived from the Japanese word "kage" (影), meaning "shadow." Due to his poor health, Kagemaru hoped to attain eternal youth by sacrificing Duel Monster spirits to the Sacred Beasts. During his duel with Jaden, his youth was returned. After being defeated, however, he returned to his aged state. He then asks for forgiveness, promising to renounce his former ways before being transported to the hospital. Kagemaru plays a Sacred Beast deck.
Nightshroud / Darkness (ダークネス, Dākunesu)
Voiced by: Hozumi Gōda, Kouji Yusa (Fubuki) (Japanese); Jason Griffith (Atticus) (English)
Nightshroud is the first of the Shadow Riders. In reality, Nightshroud is an entity of unknown origin tied to the darkness and the final antagonist in the series, who possesses Atticus's body. Being the owner of the other half of the Shadow Charm pendant in Jaden's possession, Nightshroud sets a Shadow Game for both of them where the loser has his soul sealed in a card. When defeated, Nightshroud's soul, represented by his mask, is sealed away, and Atticus is freed. During the GX Tournament, Atticus uses Nightshroud's deck in hopes of convincing Zane that the dark path taken by a duelist is a terrible course. As a result, Nightshroud's influence, which lay dormant within his cards, is once again able to take control of Atticus, only to be banished following his defeat. In the fourth season, Atticus again uses Nightshroud's deck to duel Jaden, revealing he still has nightmares about his alter-ego. During the duel, Atticus remembers that one of the missing students at the academy, Yusuke Fujiwara, was the original host of Nightshroud and, before he vanished, he made Atticus into a temporary host for Nightshroud to inhabit. Nightshroud eventually returns in the body of Fujiwara, and though he loses to Atticus in a one-on-one duel, he cheats, reversing time and preventing Atticus from activating Inferno Fire Blast. However, after losing to Jaden when he and Jesse team up against Yusuke, Nightshroud left his vessel and duels Jaden in a match with the world at stake. Jaden reverses Nightshroud's evil doings and finally destroys him. Though beaten, Nightshroud boasts that as long as there is darkness in humans, he would return, but Jaden counters by claiming that as long as there are bonds between humans, Nightshroud has been sealed. Nightshroud, while possessing Atticus, plays a Red-Eyes Darkness Dragon deck. Within Yusuke's body, Nightshroud uses a Clear deck, which inflicts negative effects to players based on their monsters' attributes, although Clear monsters are immune. Once without a host, Nightshroud uses his personal Darkness deck.
Camula (カミューラ, Kamyūra)
Voiced by: Kanako Irie (Japanese); Bella Hudson (English)
Camula is the second of the Shadow Riders. Her name is derived from the title of Joseph Sheridan le Fanu's novel, Carmilla. A vampire, Camula is a serious duelist who seeks to revive her race from its destruction by the people of Medieval Times, having been asleep within her coffin until Kagemaru uncovered it and invited her to join the Shadow Riders. She captures the souls of her opponents following their losses within dolls to fuel her cause, and uses the Shadow Charm strangler around her neck to bet the souls of others in conjunction with the Shadow Game-exclusive Illusion Gate to ensure victory. She manages to obtain the keys of Dr. Crowler and Zane, but during her duel with Jaden, her Shadow Charm's power is negated by the completed item that Jaden possesses. Out of self-confidence, Camula places her own soul on the line, which it is dragged into the gate after she loses, leaving her body empty and turning it to dust. Camula plays a Vampire deck.
Tania / Tanija Amazoness (アマゾネス・タニヤ, Amazonesu Taniya)
Voiced by: Kazue Komiya (Japanese); Alyson Johnson (English)
Amazoness Tania is the third of the Shadow Riders. A white tiger that assumes human form with her Shadow Charm gauntlet to find a worthy duelist to be her husband, Tania travels with another tiger named Bass, who resembles the Amazoness Tiger. She falls in love with Bastion Misawa and, after defeating him, makes him her bridegroom for a short time until she grows tired of him. Tania then fights Jaden in a soul match with the effect of Amazoness Arena, and eventually resumes her true form and flees. She appears before Jaden and his group during the third year as her human self, having been sucked into the second alternate dimension they visit since their last meeting. She serves as their guide through the first town they encounter, staying behind with Bastion after Jaden liberates it. Tania's Amazoness cards, based on the Amazons of Greek mythology, are divided into two decks: Courage and Knowledge. She uses the Knowledge deck against Bastion, and the Courage deck against Jaden.
Don Zaloog / Chief Zaloog (首領－ザルーグ, Shuryō Zarūgu)
Voiced by: Taiten Kusunoki (Japanese); Darren Dunstan (English)
Don Zaloog is the fourth of the Shadow Riders, who is a Duel Monster spirit brought to life by the power of the Shadow Charm eyepatch he wears. He is the leader of the band of thieves known as the Dark Scorpion Gang / Black Scorpion Graverobber Gang (黒サソリ盗掘団, Kurosasori Tōkutsu-dan), who were also brought to life by the Charm. He masquerades as a detective named Detective Zaloog (Police Inspector Manguer in the Japanese version), sent to assist the students in hiding the remaining Spirit Keys while his posse work on taking the keys incognito. However, since they fail to obtain the keys in a duel, they are unable to unlock the Spirit Gate of the Three Sacred Beasts. When Zaloog and his gang are discovered, he and Chazz Princeton duel with the remaining keys on the line. Ultimately, he and his cohorts are defeated, and the power of his Shadow Charm is nullified. After reverting to their spirit forms, the Dark Scorpions join the many weak monsters in Chazz's care, to his annoyance. Zaloog plays a Dark Scorpion deck.
Abidos III (アビドス3世, Abidosu San-sei)
Voiced by: Mamoru Miyano (Japanese); Darren Dunstan (English)
Abidos the Third is the fifth of the Shadow Riders. His name is derived from the name of the ancient Egyptian city, Abydos. An ancient pharaoh who never lost a single duel, Abidos regained physical form through the powers of the Shadow Charm headband he wears. With an army of mummies, Abidos gathers Jaden and company on his celestial yacht for a duel, and realizes that the only reason he kept winning was because his opponents always lost on purpose due to him being a pharaoh. Jaden, however, manages to give Abidos a real duel; satisfied with his defeat, Abidos gives Jaden his Shadow Charm before departing for the afterlife, the latter making a promise to meet him again in one hundred years. Abidos plays a Servants of the Pharaoh deck.
Titan (タイタン, Taitan)
Voiced by: Norio Wakamoto (Japanese); Eric Stuart (English)
Titan is the sixth of the Shadow Riders. A hitman originally hired by Crowler to deal with Jaden, Titan captured Alexis Rhodes to force Jaden into a duel for her life. Despite his reputation of possessing the power of a Millennium Item, the "Millennium Item" turns out to be a fake Millennium Puzzle, with Titan having used various tricks to mimic a Shadow Game. However, he becomes the victim of a real Shadow Game, but is saved by Kagemaru, wearing a Shadow Charm mask to bind him to the real world. Taking advantage of Alexis's desire to restore her brother's memories, Titan challenges her in the abandoned dorm where they first met, but is ultimately pulled back into the pits of darkness after being defeated. Titan plays an Archfiend deck.
Amnael (アムナエル, Amunaeru)
Voiced by: Kappei Yamaguchi (Japanese); Wayne Grayson (English)
Amnael is the seventh and final member of the Shadow Riders. A homunculus inhabited by Banner's soul. Unable to find Banner's cat Pharaoh, Alexis Rhodes, Chazz Princeton, Jaden Yuki, and the others start searching for him. While searching, Amnael challenges and defeats both Chazz and Alexis in a duel, who are sucked into Amnael's book as a result. Jaden is led to the abandoned dorm where he defeated Titan, where he finds a mummified body that resembles Banner and Amnael, who later reveals himself to be the spirit of Banner. Amnael and Jaden duel, which results in Jaden's victory. After giving Jaden his Emerald Tablet which previously held his Shadow Charm, Banner is reduced to dust along with his original mummified body. His spirit, however, lives on in the stomach of Pharaoh, and his appearance is seen when the cat is clueless, causing its body to retrieve Banner's spirit for a short amount of time. Amnael plays an Alchemy deck.

=== Society of Light ===
The Society of Light (光の結社, Hikari no Kessha) is a cult led by the alien-influenced Sartorius, whose legion of followers dedicate themselves to worshipping the Light of Destruction and are intent on cleansing the Earth of its deficiencies.

Sartorius Saiou / Takuma Saiou (斎王琢磨, Saiō Takuma)
Voiced by: Takehito Koyasu (Japanese); Maddie Blaustein (English)
A fortune-teller with dual personalities under the influence of The Light Of Destruction. Sartorius serves as the main antagonist of the second season, poised to remake the world in the image most befitting of the extraterrestrial radiance within him. Sartorius plays an Arcana Force deck.
Lorenzo Plata / Ryusei Gin (銀流星, Gin Ryūsei)
Voiced by: Kazuhiro Shindou (Japanese); Anthony Salerno (English)
Lorenzo is the champion of the "Shooting Game" arcade game. His name means "silver meteor" when translated in Japanese order. Lorenzo is employed by Alexis and Chazz to duel Jaden. Although he is defeated, he comes to understand his opponent's definition of a fun duel, but is punished by Sartorius for his failure. Leaving his hair stark white, Sartorius takes complete control of him and his future. Lorenzo plays a B. E. S. deck based on the bosses of Gradius.
Princess Rose (プリンセス・ローズ, Purinsesu Rōzu)
Voiced by: Hiroko Kasahara (Japanese); Veronica Taylor (English)
Princess Rose is a representative selected by Sartorius to duel Jaden in his place. Rose claims to have the ability to see Duel Monster spirits, but others do not believe her. Jaden, however, notices the spirit of a frog prince watching over her following their duel. Rose plays a Frog deck.
Bob "Game Show" Banter / Tsugio Kanda (神田次男, Kanda Tsugio)
Voiced by: Ryo Kubota (Japanese); Matthew Charles (English)
Bob Banter is the Game Show King who has feelings for Alexis. Saddened by the fact that Alexis never remembers his name, Bob duels Jaden in hopes of impressing her. Bob plays a Quiz deck.
Howard X. Miller / X (エックス, Ekkusu)
Voiced by: Yoshitada Otsuka (Japanese); Ted Lewis (English)
X is a Pro League duelist for the Society of Light. His surname is meant to be a pun in English, as "mill" (a term borrowed from Magic: The Gathering) denotes a direct disruption of a player's deck. X is a Pro League duelist associated with the Society of Light whose ranking is greater than Aster's. In the English version, X dreamt of becoming a pastry chef as a child, but he instead grew up to become an attorney. He successfully reduces the cards in Jaden's deck to zero, but loses when, due to the effect of the Neo-Spacian Glow Moss Jaden had summoned on X's field, caused him to discard the rest of his deck. X plays a Deck Destruction deck.
Prince Ojin / Prince Odin (オージーン王子, Ōjīn Ōji)
Voiced by: Hisayoshi Suganuma (Japanese); Darren Dunstan (English)
Prince Ojin is a professional duelist and celebrity from Misgarth. His name is meant to be a pun, as "ōjin" is the Japanese word for "royal person".
Ojin dueled against Sartorius in the GX tournament, gloating that he would defeat Sartorius with one attack, but was himself defeated before Sartorius's first turn even came. Upon his defeat, he fell under Sartorius's influence and provided him with the control switch to his mind control satellite. He returns later in the tournament to retrieve one of the switch's keys given to Jaden by Sartorius's good personality, but fails despite aid from the Dark Light. While Jaden and Sartorius face one another in their final duel, Ojin falls under Sartorius's control once again, and is successful in arming the satellite. Ojin plays a Satellite deck.
Dr. Eisenstein / Dr. Albert Zweinstein (アルバート・ツバインスタイン博士, Arubāto Tsubainshutain Hakase)
Voiced by: Takeshi Aono (Japanese); Sean Schemmel (English)
Dr. Eisenstein is a nine-time Nobel Award-winning German physicist with an IQ of 173 who specializes in duel physics, who Bastion idolizes for his unified theory of the world. His name is a pun on the name of Albert Einstein. Eisenstein arrives at Duel Academy under Prince Ojin's request and is sent by Sartorius to eliminate Jaden and retrieve his key to the mind control satellite, though his underestimation of Jaden's tactics results in his failure. He takes on Bastion Misawa as his apprentice, and he later assists the others in sending Rainbow Dragon to the other dimension and getting everyone home. Eisenstein uses a Science deck.
Sarina Saiou / Mizuchi Saiou (斎王美寿知, Saiō Mizuchi)
Voiced by: Tomo Sakurai (Japanese); Bella Hudson (English)
Sarina is Sartorius's younger sister. A Priestess, Sarina granted her assassins special abilities with her own powers and erected a barrier around Domino City that prevented Duel Monster spirits from leaving the boundary while Frost and Thunder dueled Hassleberry and Syrus. After disposing of her subordinates, she challenged Aster and Jaden to a Tag Duel in KaibaLand's virtual system, but was ultimately defeated. Sarina then revealed that she wished to save her brother from the influence of an evil aura housed in a Hero card that was shown to him when they were younger. In a final act of gratitude, she helped those trapped within the virtual world to escape, but was left behind in the collapsing program, digitizing herself to act as her brother's "guardian." While no mention of it is made in the English adaptation, the Japanese version further includes a promise by Solomon Moto to speak with Seto Kaiba in hopes of restoring her consciousness. Sarina returns near the end of the second year, contributing to the mind control satellite's end before being brought to Duel Academy via helicopter by Kaiba's associates and reunited with her brother. Sarina plays a Mirror deck.
The Light Brigade / Four Monarchs (四帝, Yon Tei)
A group of assassins in Sarina's service. They each use Monarch monsters related to their name.

Thunder / Ikazuchimaru (雷丸, Ikazuchimaru)
Voiced by: Takanori Oyama (Japanese); Jamie McGonnigal (English)
The "Ikazuchi" portion of his name in the Japanese version is derived from the word "ikazuchi" (雷), meaning "lightning."
Frost / Kourimaru (氷丸, Kōrimaru)
Voiced by: Hidenobu Kiuchi (Japanese); Marc Thompson (English)
The "Kouri" portion of his name in the Japanese version is derived from the word "kōri" (氷), meaning "ice".
Blaze / Honoumaru (火丸, Honōmaru)
The "Honou" portion of his name in the Japanese version is derived from the word "honō" (火), meaning "fire."
T-Bone / Iwamaru (岩丸)
Voiced by: Toshiharu Sakurai (Japanese); Sean Schemmel (English)
The "Iwa" portion of his name in the Japanese version is derived from the word "iwa" (岩), meaning "rock".

=== Martin Empire ===
Yubel (ユベル, Yuberu)
Voiced by: Hiromi Tsuru (Female Voice) and Hisao Egawa (Male Voice; Season 3) (Japanese); Cassandra Morris (English)
Yubel is a duel spirit owned by Jaden who is the main antagonist of season 3. When Jaden was a child, Yubel was protective of him and caused anyone to come near him to fall into a coma. Jaden had sent Yubel into a capsule which was fired into space in hopes of her coming in contact with the Darkness of Justice in order to cure her of her overprotectiveness. However, the capsule was instead affected by the Light of Destruction, driving her insane and causing her to begin to believe that love and suffering are the same thing. Upon returning to Earth, Yubel was heavily damaged to the point where her hand was the only thing left of her. Yubel met Professor Viper and made a deal with him that if he could gather enough energy to revive her and make Jaden pay, she would revive his dead son. Once Viper failed, Yubel presumably killed Viper, although his status is unclear in the English dub (in the Japanese version, she rewrites his memories to send him to walk to his death). Yubel would possess Marcel's body and then Jesse Anderson's body to show Jaden how much she loves him through the pain her actions bring to him. She carries a pathological hatred for Jaden's friends and loved ones, out of the belief that they stole him from her. In the end, during the duel with Jaden, he merges his soul with Yubel's, bringing her peace. Yubel plays a fiend/plant deck that features herself as a card.
Marcel Bonaparte / Martin Kano (加納マルタン, Kanō Marutan)
Voiced by: Asako Yoshida (Japanese); Sebastian Arcelus (English)
Marcel Bonaparte is a Ra-Yellow student and the son of Vice Chancellor Bonaparte. Depressed by his parents' constant fighting and his father leaving home, Marcel was possessed by Yubel after she sensed how he suffered. However, he would be freed from her control after Yubel gained enough energy to sustain her body and did not need him anymore. Under Yubel's control, Marcel played an Exodia deck and, after gaining the Three Sacred Beast cards, switched to a new deck that focuses on them. In the English dub, Marcel has a French accent. When he is possessed by Yubel, he loses this accent, leading to a running gag where whenever someone talks to him they ask what happened to his accent.
Professor Thelonious Viper / Professor Cobra (プロフェッサー・コブラ, Purofessā Kobura)
Voiced by: Masaya Takatsuka (Japanese); Sean Schemmel (English)
Professor Thelonious Viper was a major antagonist. During a mission with his comrades, he found an abandoned baby, only for his comrades to go in another direction and ne killed by a bomb. Believing the baby saved his life, Viper named the boy Pierce and adopted him, giving Pierce a deck of Duel Monster cards as a present. However, the cards were blown away by the wind, and Pierce was killed after being hit by an oncoming truck while going after them. In another mission, Viper encountered Yubel, who offered to resurrect Pierce if Viper were to gather energy to revive it and make Jaden pay, to which Viper agreed. Several years later, Viper entered Duel Academy and gave Bio-Bands to the students of the academy, hoping that the energy they produced from their duels would be enough to revive Yubel. Viper would eventually duel Jaden Yuki and lose to him, but the energy from the duel revives Yubel. However, Yubel found another way to keep her deal to Viper. She cast Viper in an illusion and made him believe his son never died. Viper walked off the arena that he and Jaden were dueling on and fell to his death; in the dub, his status is most likely dead but unclear. Professor Viper played a snake-themed deck.

== Minor characters ==
=== Duel Monsters ===
Several Duel Monster spirits not directly linked to the main cast appear throughout the series.

Alien of Light (光の宇宙人, Hikari no Uchuujin)
Voiced by: Takahiro Hirano (Japanese); Wayne Grayson (English)
The Alien of Light's duel with Jaden, which was arranged by Neo-Spacian Aqua Dolphin, serves as a test of Jaden's abilities to wield the powers of darkness. It plays a Different Dimension deck.
Dark Magician Girl / Black Magician Girl (ブラマジガール, Buramajigāru)
Voiced by: Yuki Nakao (Japanese); Bella Hudson (English)
A Duel Spirit whom Syrus Truesdale harbors feelings for, Dark Magician Girl surfaces during a school-wide festival to duel with Jaden. She plays a Spellcaster deck.
The Grim Reaper / God of Death (死神, Shinigami)
Voiced by: Shinobu Matsumoto (Japanese); Scottie Ray (English)
A cursed card that grants duelists incredible draw power in exchange for selling their soul. It was locked away at North Academy until Lucien stole it.
Dark World (暗黒界, Ankokukai)
A dictatorship of legendary monsters hailing from the world of the humans trapped in the third alternate dimension that Jaden and his companions visit. Its army is composed of numerous advisers and foot soldiers, and is headed by Dark World's king Brron. None prevailed against Jaden.
Freed (フリード, Furīdo)
Voiced by: Yūji Kishi (Japanese); Tom Wayland (English)
The captain of the Steel Knight army which protects the humans trapped in the third alternate dimension that Jaden and his companions visit, including the daughter and son of one of his battalion, Lars. He leads the fight against the Dark World monsters, and sacrifices himself to give Jaden a fighting chance against its knight, Zure.
Gravekeeper's Chief (墓守の長, Hakamori no Chō)
Voiced by: Bin Shimada (Japanese); Tom Sourhada (English)
The leader of the Gravekeepers, who demands that all intruders seen as tomb robbers be buried alive. He duels Jaden in a Shadow Game. He plays a Gravekeeper deck.
Yasmin /Sara (サラ)
Voiced by: Yūko Mizutani / Lisa Ortiz
The Gravekeeper's Assailant who rescues Jaden from harm while he is searching for his friends in another world. Jaden develops a crush on her, though he is ultimately captured and forced to duel the Chief in a Shadow Game. She hints at having a past relationship with Atticus Rhodes.
Supreme King advisors
Consisting of Skilled White Magician, Skilled Dark Magician, Skull Knight, Chaos Sorcerer, and Guardian Baou, they serve as henchmen to Jaden while under the guise of the Supreme King. All but Baou are destroyed prior to Jaden's defeat, and Baou is dispatched by Jaden himself afterwards.
Harpie's Brother / Birdman (バードマン, Bādoman)
Voiced by: Akio Suyama / Sean Schemmel
A winged warrior who guards the power generator in the second alternate dimension that Jaden and his companions visit. He plays a Winged-Beast deck.
Jinzo / Android – Psycho Shocker (人造人間 サイコショッカー, Jinzo Ningen Saiko Shōkā)
Voiced by: Satoshi Tsuruoka (Japanese); Sean Schemmel (English)
An evil Dark-attribute Duel Spirit who seeks to become a real person, Jinzo takes the souls of those who summon him. This may be the case because Jinzo is a Dark-attribute monster. A group of three students, including Torrey / Takadera (高寺), unwittingly call him forth, but was defeated by Jaden in a Shadow Game and forced to give up his ambition. He plays a Psycho deck.
Kaibaman / Friend of Justice – Kaibaman (正義の味方 カイバーマン, Seigi no Mikata Kaibāman)
Voiced by: Kenijirou Tsuda / Eric Stuart
A monster modeled after Seto Kaiba, Kaibaman duels and defeats Jaden after he and his friends happen upon the Duel Monsters world. He intended to quell Jaden's worries regarding Shadow Games, and thus sarcastically threw around the possibility that he himself may have been initiating such a battle with Jaden. He plays Seto Kaiba's deck.
Honest (オネスト, Onesuto)
Voiced by: Takanori Hoshino
An angel who belongs to Yusuke Fujiwara before being sealed away in a box when Yusuke goes to the darkness. At the beginning of Season 4, he disguises himself as Yusuke and uses his powers to manipulate the memories of the others into thinking he had been there all along. However, Jaden's powers show his true form, and Honest later resides inside Jaden's body until he and Jesse face Yusuke, in which Honest returns to Fujiwara's side following his defeat.

=== Season 1 ===
Admiral / Anacis (アナシス, Anashisu)
Voiced by: Kazuhiko Nishimatsu (Japanese); Ted Lewis (English)
A man who travels the sea in a submarine, The Admiral docks at Duel Academy because of his interest in Jaden Yuki, who initially believed him to be one of the Shadow Riders due to his interest in the Three Sacred Beasts. He intended to recruit Jaden for the new Duel Academy he was building under the sea. The Admiral plays a Sea deck.
Belowski / Mokeo Motegi (茂木 もけ夫, Motegi Mokeo)
Voiced by: Kei Watanabe (Japanese); Darren Dunstan (English)
An Obelisk Blue pupil and the former top student of Duel Academy, Belowski has the power to communicate with Duel Sprits. Those in his presence gradually fall asleep without proper precautions, and he is therefore confined to his own personal dorm, a secluded paradise within the depths of the school. Belowski returns during the second year as one of the few Obelisk Blue students left untouched by the Society of Light, and participates in a duel of the GX tournament against Elroy Prescott, who becomes so tired from the boy's special ability that he forfeits the match. Belowski plays a Mokey Mokey deck. His character in the English version, as well as the title of his debut episode, are based on the film, The Big Lebowski.
Beauregard / Kohara (小原)
Voiced by: Holly Kaneko (Japanese); Dan Green (English)
A Ra Yellow student who aspires to be a game designer. He played the part of the duelist "The Duel Giant", with Brier giving him instructions via a radio headset during duels. The duo did this to win cards by bullying Obelisk Blue students into unauthorized Ante Duels, which was successful until Jaden convinced them to battle him out in the open in exchange for not turning them in. Beauregard play a Goblin deck.
Brier / Ohara (大原, Ōhara)
Voiced by: Chieko Higuchi (Japanese); Pete Zarustica (English)
A Ra Yellow student who was the brains of the duelist "The Duel Giant" with Beauregard. The duo did this to win card by bullying Obelisk Blue students into unauthorized Ante Duels, which was successful until Jaden convinced them to battle him out in the open in exchange for not turning them in. Brier play a Goblin deck.
Damon / Taira Taizan (大山 平, Taizan Taira)
Voiced by: Hiroshi Tsuchida (Japanese); Frank Frankson (English)
An Obelisk Blue student who left to live in the wild to perfect a strange drawing technique. Damon returns during the second year as one of the few Obelisk Blue students left untouched by the Society of Light, and participates in one duel of the GX tournament against Mathmatica. In the English version, Damon replaces the word "I" with "me" when referring to himself. Damon plays a Draw deck. His character is based on Tarzan.
Dimitri / Kagurazaka (神楽坂)
Voiced by: Satoshi Hino (Japanese); Marc Thompson (English)
A Ra Yellow student who tends to mimic other people's decks, Dimitri dedicates himself to impersonating the owner of the deck in almost every detail. After losing a duel against Syrus with a copy of Dr. Crowler's deck, he decided to steal Yugi Muto's deck from its display case during an exhibition at Duel Academy. Despite its possession, Dimitri is defeated by Jaden, as he lacked the same heart that Yugi put into creating his deck. In the English version, Dimitri refers to his Spell Cards as "Magic Cards," the term used in the original Yu-Gi-Oh! series before the revised printing format of the TCG took effect. He also manages to convince himself that he is actually Yugi, an aspect that was not in the original version.
Foster / Ichinose (市ノ瀬)
Voiced by: Shoji Izumi (Japanese); Marc Diraison (English)
Foster, the chancellor of North Academy, aids Chazz Princeton in gaining access to the school to duel its top duelist Czar. He later places a bet on the outcome of the Duel between Chazz and Jaden with Sheppard. The prize, however, turns out to be nothing more than a kiss from Dorothy.
Czar / Yuri Edogawa (江戸川遊離, Edogawa Yūri)
Voiced by: Yoshikazu Nagano (Japanese); Sean Schemmel (English)
The top duelist of North Academy until Chazz defeats him. Czar plays a Zoa deck.
Gerard / Kosuke Kunisaki (国崎 康介, Kunisaki Kōsuke)
Voiced by: Daiki Nakamura (Japanese); Brian Maillard (English)
A reporter who snuck into Duel Academy in the guise of a Slifer Red student, Gerard intended on jumpstarting his career by ruining the school's reputation. He was originally a duelist who gave up the game after an encounter with Seto Kaiba, but after seeing Jaden and Bastion Misawa battle one another, his dueling spirit was rekindled and he decided to help find the missing students of the Academy.
Jagger Princeton / Shoji Manjoume (万丈目 正司, Manjōme Shōji)
Voiced by: Makoto Tomita (Japanese); Marc Thompson (English)
One of Chazz's older brothers, who are top in the political and financial worlds. He and Slade attempt to dictate Chazz into becoming top in the dueling world to empower the Princeton name.
Harrington Rosewood / Mitsuru Ayanokouji (綾小路 ミツル, Ayanokōji Mitsuru)
Voiced by: Yuji Ueda (Japanese); Jason Griffith (English)
The head of Duel Academy's tennis team, Harrington wishes to marry Alexis. He duels with Jaden to gain the right to take her as his fiancée. Harrington plays a Tennis deck.
Mr. Huffington / Kumazo Maeda (前田 熊蔵, Maeda Kumazō)
Voiced by: Daisuke Gouri (Japanese); Marc Thompson (English)
Chumley's father and a famous duelist, Mr. Huffington visits Duel Academy to have his son pulled from his studies to help out with his business. He has drinking problems and owns a sake company, but in the English version, he owns a hot sauce company instead. Mr. Huffington plays a Drunken deck (Hot Sauce deck in the English version).
Pierre the Gambler / Mitsuo (ミツオ, Mitsuo)
Voiced by: Anri Katsu (Japanese); Marc Thompson (English)
A childhood classmate of Alexis', Pierre is a world-famous gambler who has mastered games from blackjack to poker. Disgraced as a child when Alexis became the first person to defeat him, he stole a scarf from her and returned to Duel Academy to defeat her and reclaim his honor. Upon losing, he admitted he had fallen in love with Alexis, but is rejected. In the English version, Pierre has a French accent. Pierre plays a Gamble deck.
Slade Princeton / Chosaku Manjoume (万丈目 長作, Manjōme Chōsaku)
Voiced by: Takahiro Hirano (Japanese); Jonathan Todd Ross (English)
One of Chazz's older brothers, who are top in the political and financial worlds. He and Jagger attempt to dictate Chazz into becoming top in the dueling world to empower the Princeton name. Slade plays a Rare Dragon deck.
Wheeler / SAL (Saru, SAL)
Voiced by: Hidenobu Kiuchi (Japanese); Andrew Rannells (English)
An experimental chimpanzee that has the ability to duel, Wheeler escaped the facility where he was being held and duels with Jaden before being set free to live in the wild with the rest of his kind. Wheeler returns during the second year to remind Jaden of his time spent at Duel Academy. His name in the English version is derived from the family name of Joey Wheeler, whom Seto Kaiba titled a "dueling monkey," during the second series Yu-Gi-Oh! anime. His name in the Japanese version is pronounced "saru," which is the Japanese word for "monkey". Wheeler plays a Monkey deck.

=== Season 2 ===
Alice (アリス, Arisu)
Voiced by: Kumiko Nishihara (Japanese); Cassandra Morris (English)
The spirit of a doll possessed by the vengeful Doll Chimera card, which was ripped in half by a duelist who saw it as useless. Alice posed as a transfer student of Slifer Red and sought out victims to plunge into darkness, before being quelled when Jaden destroyed Doll Chimera, thus freeing her from its influence. She has long gray hair. Alice plays a Doll deck. Her character is based on the title character of Alice's Adventures in Wonderland.
The D / Kyle Jables (DD, Dī Dī)
Voiced by: Kazuhiko Inoue (Japanese); Marc Thompson (English)
The D is Aster Phoenix's legal guardian and the reigning champion of the Pro League for ten years. He is also the culprit behind the murder of Aster's father, having stolen the Ultimate Destiny Card. Because the card was corrupted by the Light of Destruction, The D developed a sadistic and uncaring split personality bent on destruction. After being defeated by Aster, he is killed in the explosion resulting from the Ultimate Destiny Card's purification. The D plays a Plasma deck. His former name in the English version is derived from the surname of Kyle Gass and the nickname of Jack Black (Jables). His name in the Japanese version stands for "Destiny of Duelists".
Doctor Collector (ドクター・コレクター, Dokutā Korekutā)
Voiced by: Satoshi Tsuruoka (Japanese); Sean Schemmel (English)
A collector with an IQ of 202, Doctor Collector duels with The D to claim the championship title in the Pro League. He has the ability to read the minds of other duelists, and in the past, aided the FBI in solving card-related crimes while in jail because of his vast knowledge on the subject. In the English version, the whereabouts of his physical body after the Duel is explained as being absorbed by Plasma, showing Doctor Collector's face on the left wing of Plasma during the confrontation between The D and Aster Phoenix. In the Japanese version, the fire caused by the Ultimate Destiny Card in the Pro League stadium is linked to his death, though DD believes it was in fact the shock of being defeated that proved fatal. Doctor Collector plays a Spellcaster Lock deck.
Franz (フランツ, Furantsu)
Voiced by: Iori Hayashi (Japanese); Marc Thompson (English)
A card designer from Industrial Illusions who is jealous of Chumley Huffington's talents, whose designs are looked down upon for being too powerful for gameplay. He manipulates the only remaining copy of The Winged Dragon of Ra stolen from the company, avoiding the god's punishment with a Spell Card of his own creation, Mound of the Bound Creator, but is defeated by Jaden and agrees to return to Industrial Illusions as a loyal employee. In the English version, Franz has a German accent. Franz plays a Ra deck.

==== GX Pro League duelists ====
Several Pro League duelists are invited by Chancellor Sheppard to participate in the GX tournament.

Elroy Prescott / Sombre Guerrero (サンブレ・ゲレロ, Sanbure Gerero)
Voiced by: Kenji Iwama (Japanese); Sean Schemmel (English)
Ranked ninth in the Pro League, Memphis champion (in the Japanese version, he is instead a Latin duelist) Elroy duels Belowski. His name in the Japanese version is Spanish for "shadow soldier".
Gelgo (ゲルゴ, Gerugo)
Voiced by: Takashi Matsuyama (Japanese); Marc Thompson (English)
Gelgo duels Chazz. His character based on Golgo 13.
Maitre' D / Sommelier Parker (ソムリエ・パーカー, Somurie Pākā)
Voiced by: Naoya Uchida (Japanese); Marc Thompson (English)
Ranked eighth in the Pro League, Maitre d' begins dueling Mindy and Jasmine 2-on-1, but Alexis Rhodes steps in to duel in their place. He plays a Wine deck.
Mathmatica (マティマティカ, Mattimatika)
Voiced by: Shinichiro Ohta (Japanese); Sean Schemmel (English)
Ranked tenth in the Pro League, Mathmatica duels Damon. He plays a Math deck.
Linda / Lindo (リンド, Rindo)
Voiced by: Noriko Namiki (Japanese); Lisa Ortiz (English)
The secretary and most trusted advisor of Prince Ojin, Linda reveals the secret behind the two keys given to Jaden and Aster by Sartorius' good personality. She also assists Tyranno in chasing after Ojin when he prepares to arm their country's mind control satellite.
Lucien Grimley / Ikaku Tachibana (橘 一角, Tachibana Ikaku)
Voiced by: Kazuhiro Nakata (Japanese); David Wills (English)
A failing duelist originally from North Academy, Lucien makes a deal with the malevolent spirit of the forbidden and cursed Grim Reaper card sealed by the school, selling his soul to obtain incredible draw power. Although he claims that his goal is to be victor of the GX tournament, his true wish was to experience a trusting bond with his deck. To that end, he threw the Reaper's card away, committed to winning without its assistance. Lucien plays a One Round Win deck.
Missy / Ran Kochou (胡蝶 蘭, Kochō Ran)
Voiced by: Naoko Matsui (Japanese); Lisa Ortiz (English)
A member of Obelisk Blue infatuated with Zane Truesdale, Missy duels Syrus in hopes of pursuing her love interest in the Pro League. Missy plays an Insect deck.
Mr. Shroud / Monkey Saruyama (モンキーサル山, Monkī Saruyama)
Voiced by: Hiroshi Yanaka (Japanese); Marc Thompson (English)
A promoter that offers Zane the opportunity to participate in the Underground Duel against Mad Dog to redeem himself after his chain of failures in the Pro League. In the English version, Shroud has a Southern accent.
Mad Dog / Inukai (犬飼)
Voiced by: Yoshihisa Kawahara (Japanese); Sean Schemmel (English)
An underground Duelist that is the "Gatekeeper of Hell" after defeating twenty Duelists. He duels Zane in the underground dueling bar and is defeated. In the English version, Mad Dog's voice is an imitation of Mike Tyson. Mad Dog plays a Slime deck.
Orlando / Kabukid (カブキッド, Kabukiddo)
Voiced by: Kouji Ochiai (Japanese); Marc Thompson (English)
In the English version, Orlando is a Broadway actor who says that he starred in plays such as Deck Side Story and Duelist on the Roof. In the Japanese version, Kabukid is a professional cosplay duelist. Orlando duels against Jaden in the GX tournament. Both Crowler and Bonaparte are adoring fans of Orlando. Orlando plays a Kabuki deck.
Reginald "Reggie" Van Howell III / Houzan Gokaido (五階堂宝山, Gokaidō Hōzan)
Voiced by: Shimika Ishiba (Japanese); Pete Capella (English)
An Obelisk Blue student also known as Mr. Elite (エリート君, Elitekun), Reggie is an up-and-coming elite duelist at Duel Academy, who duels with Chazz. In the English version, he insults Chazz without end, while in the Japanese version, he idolizes him instead. Reggie plays a Warrior deck.

=== Season 3 ===
Echo (エコー, Ekō)
Voiced by: Yuki Nakao (Japanese); Priscilla Everett (English)
Echo is Adrian Gecko's friend, who admires him for putting his younger brother's needs ahead of himself despite the fact that he will always be considered lesser than the true heir to the Gecko family name, and sees that he is fit to rule the world as a king, though his responsibilities to his sibling prevent him from doing so. As an adult, she became captain of the Gecko Financial Group's spy submarine. In the third alternate dimension that Jaden and his companions visit, Adrian sacrifices her to the spirit of Exodia the Forbidden One to make it his servant. Her spirit later aids Adrian in his duel against Jesse when he is possessed by Yubel, but ends up being used by Yubel to regain its power when she feeds off the darkness in her soul. She disappears after Adrian's defeat, causing him to mourn for her loss. Her name is derived from the name of the nymph Echo in Greek mythology.
Professor Stein / Professor Kouji Satou (佐藤 浩二 / 佐藤先生, Satō Kōji / Satō-sensei)
Voiced by: Mitsuru Miyamoto (Japanese); Marc Diraison (English)
A Duel Academy professor and former Pro League duelist, Stein harbors a grudge towards Jaden for ruining the interest of other students in his lectures with his lazy approach to lessons. He prevents Jaden from reaching Professor Viper in the lab where the monkey Wheeler was trained, but seemingly falls to his death upon being defeated. In the English version, his field of specialty is history, and he was urged by his parents to earn his degree, leading him to drop out of the professional dueling circuit, while in the Japanese version, he instead comes from a poverty-stricken family and dueled to support it. In the English version, Stein also makes numerous references to the fifth season of the original anime, which took place in ancient Egypt. Stein plays a Scab Scarknight deck. His character in the English version, as well as the title of his debut episodes, are based on the game show, Win Ben Stein's Money and its eponymous host.
Trapper / Giese Hunt (ギース・ハント, Gīsu Hanto)
Voiced by: Ken Narita (Japanese); Sean Schemmel (English)
A ruthless Duel Spirit hunter, Trapper is hired by Professor Viper to duel Jesse Anderson in the lab where the monkey Wheeler was trained. Himself a victim of Duel Spirit theft, he seeks to attain the yet-to-be-created Rainbow Dragon card and lures Jesse into a battle by sealing the spirit of Sapphire Pegasus in a capsule. Trapper plays a Hunting deck.

=== Season 4 ===
Yusuke Fujiwara (藤原 優介, Fujiwara Yūsuke)
Voiced by: Makoto Naruse, Mai Fujita (young)
A mysterious new student attending Duel Academy. Jaden later discovers from Atticus that Yusuke was a student with him and Zane several years earlier, but vanished in the abandoned dormitory. Atticus later remembers that Yusuke was the original host of Nightshroud, and bestowed Nightshroud's powers and spirit to him before he vanished. The Yusuke currently at Duel Academy is later revealed to be the duel spirit Honest, Yusuke's spirit partner, who has been searching for him. Honest is later destroyed by Trueman when he sacrifices himself to help Jaden, but Jaden adds him to his deck and uses him in his third rematch against Trueman. The true Yusuke later returns to Duel Academy as the leader of Trueman's invasion, now the leader of the world of Darkness and endowed with its full power. He is challenged by Atticus to a duel after defeating virtually everyone at Duel Academy and defeats him, sending him to the world of Darkness. Yusuke is then challenged to a three-way duel with Jaden and Jesse. He defeats Jesse, but Jaden summons Rainbow Neos to defeat him and exorcise Nightshroud from his body. Yusuke plays a Clear deck.
Trueman (トゥルーマン, Turūman)
Voiced by: Hozumi Gōda
Also called Mr. T (ミスターT, Misutā T), is a mysterious being made up of dark energy that appears at Duel Academy to duel Jaden several times. There are more than one of him, however, so if the Trueman Jaden duels is the same one each time or not is uncertain. Trueman claims he is named as such because he speaks only the truth. Trueman eventually assaults the city of Domino and possesses or kidnaps most of its citizens as a ploy to lure Jaden away from Duel Academy, allowing him to assault the school by possessing the student Taigo Sorano. After the army of Truemen defeat all but Atticus, Atticus uses the power of Nightshroud to undo the amnesia Trueman has inflicted upon him and challenges their leader, Yusuke Fujiwara. During Jaden's duel with Yusuke, all the Trueman clones are killed by Rainbow Neos. Trueman plays a Dark deck. Trueman is similar to Agent Smith an antagonist from The Matrix films.
Makoto Inotsume (猪爪 誠, Inotsume Makoto)
Voiced by: Shinji Kawada
The successor to the dueling style of Psycho-Style, the rival school of Cyber-Style. Makoto challenges Zane Truesdale with the intent of declaring the superiority of Psycho-Style over Cyber-Style. However, when Zane's health fails, Syrus Truesdale duels Makoto in Zane's stead and defeats him. Makoto plays a Psycho deck.

==== Senrigan Group ====
The Senrigan Group is a powerful corporation that sponsors Aster Phoenix. The Group manufactured the ultimate D card Destiny End Dragoon for Aster, and when it was thought stolen his career was threatened. However, when the Group later recovers the card, they agree to continue funding Aster.

Mike (マイク, Maiku)
Voiced by: Tetsu Inada
A television promoter who attempts to set up a promotional duel between Aster Phoenix and Jaden Yuki. Mike later recruits Chazz Princeton to duel in Aster's place after stealing the Destiny End Dragoon card in the hopes Aster's career will fail. After telling Chazz to purposely lose to Jaden for the sake of television ratings, he sets up a similar duel between Chazz and Aster. However, the card is recovered from Mike and he is arrested.
Tsutomu (ツトム)
Voiced by: Aki Kanada
A young boy residing in Domino City. He is frustrated that he is "not strong enough" at dueling, and is consoled by Trueman, who appears due to "the darkness in Tsutomu's heart". He joins Trueman by his own accord in order to "become stronger", but later appears to be possessed by Trueman. He is used by Trueman to gain control over the rest of the residents of Domino City. It is also Trueman in disguise as him who corners Axel Brodie while the latter was investigating the city.
Taigo Sorano (空野 大悟, Sorano Taigo)
Voiced by: Toshiyuki Toyonaga
A top-ranked Obelisk Blue student in his second year who duels Jaden in the graduation tournament. After losing, Sorano is possessed by Trueman and used to duel the rest of the Academy. Sorano plays a Horus deck.

== Manga ==
Koyo Hibiki (響 紅葉, Hibiki Kōyō)
Koyo, once a three-time Duel Monsters champion, was tricked by a dark entity to become an elite duelist, although his memory of the incident was erased, and the entity declared that his health would fail each time he drew a card. Koyo decided to duel a young Jaden while in a Tokyo hospital despite his failing health, falling into a coma after finishing the duel. In a flashback, it is revealed that Chazz received an autograph from him, and in the process, Koyo's Winged Kuriboh altered Chazz's Light and Darkness Dragon card. Koyo plays a nature-based Elemental Hero deck. Before the start of the manga, Koyo gave Jaden his deck, including the one-of-a-kind Elemental Hero Terra Firma card. Koyo's full name means "autumn colors".
Midori Hibiki (響 みどり / 響先生, Hibiki Midori / Hibiki-sensei)
The head teacher of first-year Slifer Red students at Duel Academy and Koyo's sister.
Seika Konihata (小日向 星華, Konihata Seika)
A contestant in the Duel Academy beauty pageant, Seika becomes angered when Alexis wins the pageant. After forfeiting the pageant when Jaden defeats Alexis in a duel, Seika returns during a tournament to duel Jaden herself. She is defeated, and angrily rejects Jaden's suggestion that the duel was fun. Seika plays a Serpent deck.
David Rabb (デイビット・ラブ, Deibitto Rabu)
Rabb is a companion of Zane who follows him to Duel Academy. He is aware of the existence of duel spirits and targets Jaden for his Winged Kuriboh, although David later becomes aware that Chazz Princeton also has a duel spirit. He becomes a finalist in a tournament to celebrate Zane's return to Duel Academy, and has some sort of connection to a mysterious entity who desires the energy of duel spirits to manifest itself. It is also revealed that he possesses one of the Planet cards. Rabb plays a Big Saturn deck.
Reggie MacKenzie (レジー・マッケンジー, Rejī Makkenjī)
MacKenzie is a companion of Zane who follows him to Duel Academy. She is of the existence of duel spirits and targets Jaden for his Winged Kuriboh. She becomes a finalist in a tournament to celebrate Zane's return to Duel Academy, and has some sort of connection to a mysterious entity who desires the energy of duel spirits to manifest itself. It is also revealed that she possesses one of the Planet cards. MacKenzie plays an Angel deck.
Ryuga (龍牙, Ryūga)
Ryuga is a teacher trainee assigned to duel fifty students and be recognized as an official professor of Duel Academy on the condition that he pass them all. He is rumored to take the cards of those he defeats. When he duels, he uses a special ring to emit an electromagnetic force that disables his opponent's Duel Disk, preventing their use of Spell Cards. He challenges Jaden, but the duelist defeats Ryuga with his Alternate Fusion card. Ryuga plays a Dinosaur deck.

== Other characters from Yu-Gi-Oh! Duel Monsters ==
Yugi Muto / Yugi Mutou (武藤 遊戯, Mutō Yūgi)
Voiced by: Shunsuke Kazama (Japanese); Dan Green (English)
Seto Kaiba (海馬 瀬人, Kaiba Seto)
Voiced by: Kenjirō Tsuda (Japanese); Eric Stuart (English)
Maximillion Pegasus / Pegasus J. Crawford (ペガサス・J・クロフォード, Pegasasu Jei Kurofōdo)
Voiced by: Jiro "Jay" Takasugi (Japanese); Darren Dunstan (English)
Solomon Muto / Sugoroku Mutou (武藤 双六, Mutō Sugoroku)
Voiced by: Tadashi Miyazawa (Japanese); Maddie Blaustein (English)
