= Daitokuji =

Daitokuji may refer to:

- Daitoku-ji, a Buddhist temple in Japan
- Lyman Banner, a character in Yu-Gi-Oh! GX, known as Professor Daitokuji in Japan
- B-ko Daitokuji, a character in the 1986 Japanese anime film Project A-ko
