= Tai Chi Chasers =

Animated action-adventure television series

- The Tai Chi Chasers: (from left to right) Sena, Finn, Rai, Donha, and Tori.
- Taichi Senjimon
- Genre: Adventure; Science fiction Fantasy; Manhwa; Anime
- Directed by: Hiroki Shibata; Young Chan Kim
- Opening theme: Searching for a Sign
- Countries of origin: South Korea; Japan
- Original languages: Korean
- No. of seasons: 3
- No. of episodes: 39

Production
- Running time: 21–22 minutes (seasons 1–2); 23-24 minutes (season 3)
- Production companies: JM Animation; Toei Animation; Iconix Entertainment

Original release
- Network: KBS 1TV
- Release: 29 April 2007 – 20 January 2008

Tai Chi Chasers (Note: (Korean: 태극천자문, romanized: Taegeuk Cheonjamun, Japanese: 太極千字文, romanized: Taichi Senjimon, lit. '1000 Characters of Tai Chi' in Asian territories)) also known as Taegeuk Kids on KBS World is an action-adventure television series produced by JM Animation and Toei Animation. The series, inspired by East Asian mythology, revolves around the protagonist Rai, a child who gains supernatural abilities and becomes involved in a long-running armed conflict between two ethnic groups, the Tigeroids and the Dragonoids.

Tai Chi Chasers originally aired on KBS 1TV from 29 April 2007 to 20 January 2008. A localised Cantonese version of the series aired on TVB Jade in Hong Kong from 13 August 2009 to 1 January 2010, and an English language localization was distributed through 4Kids Entertainment in the United States, airing on Toonzai from 17 September 2011 until 2 June 2012.

== Premise and plot ==
Tai Chi Chasers is set in a fantasy world that is influenced by East Asian mythology. Within this fantasy world, two ethnic groups, the protagonist Tigeroids (Korean: 호족) and the antagonist Dragonoids (Korean: 용족) are engaged in a long-running armed conflict over Tai Chi cards, a set of 500 magical artefacts that both groups seek for their own purposes.

The plot revolves around the main character Rai, a child who discovers that he is descended from the Tigeroids after his community is attacked. He therefore possesses various magical abilities that all Tigeroids possess. Rai becomes a combatant in the Tigeroid armed forces, and enhances his magical abilities. He also becomes a member of an elite group of combatants, known as the Tai Chi Chasers.

Tai Chi Chasers utilizes Korean hanja to represent the various magical abilities and artefacts present throughout the series. In the English language version, distributed by 4Kids Entertainment, the hanja characters are referred to both by their Korean pronunciations and their English language translations.

== Production ==
Tai Chi Chasers was produced by KBS in association with Toei Animation. The series was distributed and localised by 4Kids Entertainment in the United States, airing on Toonzai from 17 September 2011 to 2 June 2012. The series has a total of 39 episodes, broadcast across three seasons, with 13 episodes in each season.

Similar to other productions dubbed by 4Kids Entertainment and its subsidiary 4Kids Productions, the third season of the series was not dubbed into English. This was mainly due to the dub being produced following 4Kids' bankruptcy and eventual sale of their assets in June 2012. The licensing rights would eventually revert to co-producer Iconix Entertainment.

Tai Chi Chasers was also adapted into Hebrew in Israel, where it aired on Arutz HaYeladim under the name Tai Chi Champions.

== Characters ==
=== Tigeroids ===
- Rai (라이)
  - voiced by Sohn Jeong Ah (Korean)
  - voiced by Erica Schroeder (English)

Rai is the main male protagonist, living a normal, happy life with his mother until his world is attacked and destroyed by Luka. Rai is rescued by the Tai Chi Chasers and brought to the Tiger Airship, he learns of his origins as a Tigeroid while joining the crew so he can take revenge upon Luka. Despite his seemingly amateurish mistakes on the team, Rai is considered a genius at using Tai Chi symbols and is quite intelligent, his recklessness being the cause of his mistakes. He uses the Hwa (fire), Geom (sword), Po (aggression or violence), Yang (loud), gok (bend), cue (ball), Chum (slice), Hoh (Attract), Mon (Dream) Mong (Forget), Ramm (Chaos), Shi (Time), Sah (Hot) Tai Chi cards. He can combine Po and Hwa to form Pock (explosion) and two Hwa's to form Yum (Flame). At the beginning of the series, Rai had some sort of grudge against everyone on the team, but he soon grew to like his teammates. He also has a gifted ability where a tai chi card could react to his different emotions. He was secretly given the Myun (army), Whoo (wings), and Goc (discover) by the masked tigeroid warrior which are Dragonoid cards making him a hybrid. He is now the captain of the chasers due to his cleverness in battle and intelligence. Komorka gave him the Together Card, which he has used to combine all of the chasers' powers.

- Sena (세나)
  - voiced by Lee Hyeon Seon (Korean)
  - voiced by Suzy Myers (English)

Sena is the main female protagonist, the kind and strong leader of the Tai Chi Chasers. However, she gets into heated arguments with Rai on more than one occasion, though she comes to understand him a bit during their search for the bend Tai Chi card. Eventually, she resigns from being a leader to Rai, even though she still serves as a co-leader. She's rumored to have a crush on Rai. She uses the chun (river/stream), mock (tree), pong (wind), cho (grass), Pa (Enable), am (darkness), and Do (road) Tai Chi cards.

- Finn (핀)
  - voiced by Oh Kirugyon (Korean)
  - voiced by Tom Wayland (English)

The calm and collected member of the team. Finn uses his Bing (ice), Jun (lighting), Jul (break), Yuk (pull in), and Kyun (Mirror) Tai Chi cards. He is also very good at games. In the very first game of pool that he ever played, he won in one shot. Finn, at times, can be cold and unfriendly but cares dearly for his friends. He was given the So (sweep) card but has never used it, even in dire situations.

- Donha (돈하)
  - voiced by Sa Sonun (Korean)
  - voiced by Marc Thompson (English)

The oldest of the group. He loves to eat large amounts of food and uses the Byeok (wall) Seok (stone), Bo (float), Rok (strength), and Am (brick) tai Chi cards. He is willing to put himself in danger to help his friends out. Such as when he lifted that large stone to protect Rai. He is the brute strength of the chasers and knows much about Tai Chi cards.

- Tori (또리)
  - voiced by Kim Seo-yeong (Korean)
  - voiced by Veronica Taylor (English)

The smallest of the group, a trickster who uses the Hwan (illusion) and Myeon (sleep), Quiem (lightening), Hwal (slip), Sol (laughing or lighten up) Gei (open) Sang (up), hwah (change), Soh (small), soo (search/find), Bi (sad), Soc (superspeed) Kyo (Grow) Tai Chi cards. He has developed a close relationship with Rai as he was not willing to leave Rai alone with Luka, and Rai was not willing to leave Tori behind.

- Hak (하크)
  - voiced by Eun Young Seon (Korean)
  - voiced by David Wills (English)

A talking cat who can detect Tai Chi cards for the Tigeroids. He was revealed to be friends with Duran.

- Elder Komorka (코모루카)
  - voiced by Kayzie Rogers (English)

The Chasers' elder and only adult member of the crew. She has used a very powerful Storm Tai Chi combination

- Masked Warrior/Laura (Rai's mother)

A mysterious female tigeroid who wears a mask. She wields the Riu (flow) Po (foam), Jun (Notify), Gwang (Light), Boom (Destruction) Tai Chi cards. It is questionable if she is Rai's mother or not.

- Hannah (한나)
  - voiced by An Yeong-ah (Korean)
  - voiced by Rebecca Soler (English)
  - voiced by Eden Gamliel (Hebrew)
- General Aidan (아단)
  - voiced by Marc Thompson (English)

Aidan: A tigeroid general who is also Sena's dad, his words caused Sena to doubt herself and resign as leader (even though she is a co-leader now). He wields Se (Arrow) and Tsu (Shield) tai chi cards.

- Asty (아스티)
  - voiced by Amanda Schuckman (English)
- Cloda (크로더)
  - voiced by Amanda Schuckman (English)
- Straw (스트라)
- General Zushen (즈센)
  - voiced by Mike Pollock (English)
- Elder Sid (시드)
  - voiced by Marc Thompson (English)
- Elder Pyron (파이론)

=== Dragonoids ===
- Luka (루카)
  - voiced by Wayne Grayson (English)

Luka is Rai's main opponent and enemy throughout the series. His only wish is to defeat Rai and his friends for good. He wields the Su (water), Jah (pierce), Gwae (Destruction), and Jumm (Steam) Tai Chi cards. Mischka claimed that they were friends, but something must have torn them apart.

- Jahara (자하라)
  - voiced by Erica Schroeder (English)

A female dragonoid. She usually wouldn't defeat a guy while he's down, but makes Rai an exception. She wields the Sah (thread), Dome (break) and Mo (spear) Tai Chi cards. It is unknown why Her's and Finn's break cards have different symbols. She has a secret crush on Luka.

- Garnia (가르니아)
  - voiced by Marc Thompson (English)

A brutal dragonoid that shows no mercy and will go as far as to use unfair tactics, such as shutting off the Chasers' activators. He wields the real Pock (explosion), Gaang (Steel), Dei (Big), Cha (Car), and Bang (disable) Tai Chi cards.

- Ave (아브)
  - voiced by Wayne Grayson (English)

A cocky prankster of the dragonoids. He wields the Biān (whip) Tai Chi card as his main weapon, while his other cards include Gian (smoke), Ray (captivity), Jum (Heavy), Giang (Transform), Pei (Close), Juum (Hate), Bei (Multiply), Yi (Movement) and Sha (down). After failing Mischka, he is sent back to Sunn.

- General Vicious (비샤스)
  - voiced by Darren Dunstan (English)

The general of the dragonoids He wields the forbidden Tai Chi card Gwi (ghost) and regular Dei (Big) Tai Chi card. After failing, he is severely punished and apparently transformed or killed.

- Duran (드란)

A talking dragon whom the dragonoids use to track the Tai Chi cards. He looks up to General Vicious and even states that he is his hero. He mentioned he missed Vicious after he was sent back to Sunn. He is revealed to be friends with Hak.

- General Mischka (미슈카)
  - voiced by Marc Thompson (English)

The new general of the dragonoids, whom even Luka fears. He claims that he and Luka were friends. He wields the Eum (sound) and Gyok (hit) Tai Chi Cards, along with other cards as well as Yi (Movement), Mock (Curtain), Hyung (Hideous) Bonga (Seal), Boom (Destruction), Hwan (Stealth), Boon (Divide), Ji (Stop), Hyub (Absorb), Hwan (Possess).

- Jakata (쟈카타)
  - voiced by Gary Littman (English; Season 2)
  - voiced by Danny Kramer (English; Season 3)

Jakata is the leader of the Dragonoid Assault Squad called in by the Dragonoid Emperor to replace the failing group of Luka and the others. As a leader, he focuses on his missions and always obeys orders, occasionally making jokes about his missions. After the Tai Chi Chasers defeated Mischka, Jakata nearly killed the badly wounded Mischka in Episode 33, but Mischka used the Possession card to send his soul into Jakata's body, causing Jakata to fall under Mischka's control. He wields the Yul (Heat), Chung (Bug), Po (Cannon), Giang (Thorn), Tahn (Missile), Sok (Tie), and Wae (Sacrifice) cards.

- Lita (리타)
- Yanima (야니마)
  - voiced by Jason Griffith (English)
- Terra (테라)
  - voiced by Amy Palant (English)
- Dag (다그)
- Lord Gherba/Luva (Rai's father)
  - voiced by Marc Diraison
- Emperor Diga (디가)
  - voiced by Sean Schemmel

Emperor Diga is the current Emperor of the Dragonoid race. He is striving to become the Tai Chi King by retrieving all the Tai Chi 1000 for himself, a plan that is shared by his traitorous general, Mischka. He was once a Dragonoid General himself prior to becoming the Emperor, overthrowing the previous Dragonoid Emperor in order to rise to his current position of leadership in the Dragonoid Empire. He wields the Hyung (Hideous), Myul (Erupt), Yuun (Shadow), Youm (Burn), Jun (Notify), Juum (Hate), Yuung (Cursed), Ma (Beast) Cards, along with others.

- Phoebe (비비)
  - voiced by Kate Bristol (English)
- Master Loren/Sensei (로로아)
  - voiced by Joe J. Thomas (English)
- General Bob (바르그)
  - voiced by D.C. Douglas (English)
- General Jarrell (자레스)
  - voiced by Jason Griffith (English)
- Dragonoid Elders
- Dragonoid Robots

These are goons used by all of the dragonoids. There are different types of these robots

=== Other ===
- Kyo (키오
- Yuri (유리)
- Orphanage Kids
  - Yomi (요미)
  - Cheashy (치시)
  - Sam (산모)
    - voiced by Jason Griffith
- Spirit Prince
- Spirit Princess
- Spirit King (태극왕)
  - voiced by Mike Pollock

== International broadcast ==
| Country / Region | Channel | Premiere | Season finale |
|---|---|---|---|
| South Korea | KBS1 | April 29, 2007 | January 20, 2008 |
| Thailand | DVD | 2008 | |
| Hong Kong | TVB | August 13, 2009 | January 1, 2010 |
| United States | The CW4Kids | September 17, 2011 | May 5, 2012 |
| Israel | Arutz HaYeladim | January 7, 2012 | March 31, 2012 |
| France | CanalJ | May 6, 2012 | January 27, 2013 |

== List of episodes ==
=== Season 1 (2007) ===
| No. | English title Korean title | Original release date | English release date |
|---|---|---|---|
| 1 | "An Amazing Discovery" (Korean: 화광충천 불 화) | 29 April 2007 | 17 September 2011 |
Rai, a child, travels downtown to purchase a birthday present for his mother, but is challenged by Tori, a Tigeroid and member of the Tai Chi Chasers, to a card stacking competition. Rai wins the competition and uses his winnings to purchase a present. While returning home, he is accosted by Luka, a Dragonoid. This encounter leads to a series of events which results in the destruction of Rai's home and the mysterious disappearance of his mother. Tori then reappears and transports Rai to an airship that is controlled by the Tigeroids.
| 2 | "The Chase Begins!" (Korean: 발동 태극천자문) | 6 May 2007 | 24 September 2011 |
Rai meets Komorka, one of the three Tigeroid Elders, and boards the Tigeroid Airship, where it is revealed that Rai is a Tigeroid. He also encounters two Dragonoid characters, Ave and Jahara.
| 3 | "Fitting In" (Korean: 소문만복래 웃으면 복이 와요) | 13 May 2007 | 1 October 2011 |
Rai experiences difficulties adjusting to life aboard the Tigeroid airship.
| 4 | "Friend and Foe" (Korean: 붕우유신 우리는 친구) | 20 May 2007 | 8 October 2011 |
Rai and Donha attempt to recover a Tai Chi card.
| 5 | "Totally Warped" (Korean: 난형난제 대장은 괴로워) | 27 May 2007 | 15 October 2011 |
Rai and Sena encounter a spherical spatial anomaly originating from a Tai Chi card.
| 6 | "Hidden Powers!" (Korean: 폭발 라이의 숨겨진 힘) | 3 June 2007 | 22 October 2011 |
The Tai Chi Chasers engage in combat against Dragonoid military robots.
| 7 | "An Ocean of Trouble!" (Korean: 하나를 위한 모두 모두를 위한 하나) | 10 June 2007 | 29 October 2011 |
The Tai Chi Chasers attempt to recover a Tai Chi card from the ocean.
| 8 | "Opposite Day!" (Korean: 차가운 불꽃 뜨거운 가슴) | 17 June 2007 | 5 November 2011 |
Rai is jealous of Finn's superior performance in the field. He ignores Finn's advice during combat and attempts to use a Tai Chi card against the Dragonoids. However, Rai is unable to properly use the artifact due to his lack of experience, which leads to Tori being captured by the Dragonoids as a prisoner of war. Later, Finn puts himself in a vulnerable position in order to distract the Dragonoids so that Rai can successfully rescue Tori from the enemy. In the end, Rai recognises Finn's altruistic qualities and reconciles with him, although Rai still resolves to eventually surpass his abilities.
| 9 | "Hannah's Back!" (Korean: 폭풍전야 말괄량이 불청객) | 24 June 2007 | 12 November 2011 |
Sena's sister attempts to obtain membership in the Tai Chi Chasers.
| 10 | "Fly, Rai!" (Korean: 날아라 라이 빛의 날개로) | 1 July 2007 | 19 November 2011 |
Sena attempts to convince Rai that he has more important objectives than locating his mother. Rai is angered and leaves the Tai Chi Chasers. While leaving, Rai discovers that the Dragonoid armed forces are planning to destroy the Tigeroid airship, but does not reveal this information to his former comrades-in-arms due to his resentment towards Sena. He returns to his former community, where he meets his friend, Keith, who alerts Rai to the fact that his destroyed home has been rebuilt, with an unrelated family living there. This prompts Rai to realise that the Tai Chi Chasers and the greater Tigeroid community were acting as a surrogate family for him. He resolves to reunite with them and resume the fight against the Dragonoid forces. Unbeknownst to him, however, his return to the Tigeroids is being watched by the Dragonoid forces.
| 11 | "General's Daughter!" (Korean: 부전녀전 그 아버지에 그 딸) | 8 July 2007 | 26 November 2011 |
General Aidan, Sena's father, arrives and questions her ability to lead the Tigeroid armed forces in the future.
| 12 | "Follow the Leader" (Korean: 좌절금지 시련은 있어도 좌절은 없다) | 15 July 2007 | 3 December 2011 |
Sena loses confidence in her leadership skills. Meanwhile General Vicious launches a full-scale attack on the Tigeroid airship, with the help of his forbidden "Ghost" Tai Chi Character. However, Vicious fails when Komorka uses a combination of Tai Chi Characters to create a powerful storm. The impact of the ship causes Vicious's Ghost character to wear off, and he orders the Dragonoids to retreat. Back at the Dragonoid base, Emperor Diga decides to "transform" Vicious to make an example of him for the other Dragonoids. Emperor Diga uses a Tai Chi Character to begin transforming Vicious into something terrible, and Duran looks on in fear, as General Vicious screams in fear.
| 13 | "All Together Now" (Korean: 의기투합 모두의 마음을 합하여) | 22 July 2007 | 10 December 2011 |
As punishment for his failure, Dragonoid Emperor Diga uses a Tai Chi Character to transform Vicious into a pile of dust, causing him to scream in agony, while Duran watches fearfully. The Chasers enter a forest where everything is made gigantic by a converging Tai Chi Character. Ave appears and attacks the chasers with a group of giant beetles, who are all under the control of Ave's control Tai Chi. However, the beetles' leader helps Rai and the others after escaping Ave's control character's power. Ave is defeated, and the beetles are returned to normal when the Chasers obtain the Tai Chi card. Komorka then meets the other two Tigeroid Elders, to discuss the converging characters (which are thought to be caused by Diga's actions, back in Suhn). Before leaving, Komorka declares both Rai and Sena to be the leader of the Tai Chi Chasers, until her return. Back at the Luftdrake (the Dragonoids' base on Earth), when the waiting Dragonoid team notices Ave's torn clothes and beat up condition, they asked him what happened; Ave angrily tells them not to even think about it. The Dragonoid's communication portal activates, and Emperor Diga sends a new general to Earth (General Mischka), to replace Vicious. Upon seeing their new general, the entire Dragonoid team including Luka gasps in shock as they recognize and fear their new general. Note: In the English-language localisation produced by 4Kids, the scene that shows General Vicious's transformation was cut, so viewers of the episode could only hear his screaming.

=== Season 2 (2007) ===
| No. | English title Korean title | Original release date | English release date |
|---|---|---|---|
| 14 | "Perfect Pets" (Korean: 완전소중 하크와 드란) | 29 July 2007 | 11 February 2012 |
Upon seeing his new team's reaction, General Mischka, the ruthless replacement for General Vicious, sarcastically says that he was expecting a "friendlier welcome." When Ave refuses to obey General Mischka, due to his young age and small size, Mischka tortures Ave with the Tai Chi Eum' sound, which amplifies the sound around Ave's ears by 10 times. Mischka then tauntingly wags his finger at Ave, while he screams in agony, until Ave gives in. Later, the dragon Duran recalls Mischka calling him a "useless reptile." Feeling useless to the Dragonoids, Duran jumps ship and goes through a lot of city troubles until a girl, Yuri, rescues him, naming him "Blackie." Hak thinks that he doesn't belong with the Chasers anymore, and leaves the team. He ends up in the street like a stray cat. Yuri finds him and takes him home. Yuri says she has another pet "friend" for him, Duran. It is later revealed that both Hak and Duran were friends before the Dragonoid-Tigeroid War began. They quickly become friends again. Soon afterward, both the Dragonoids and the Tigeroids figure out that their respective friend is missing, and look for them. Jahara leaves the Luftdrake to find Duran. At Yuri's house both pets fight over getting Yuri's attention, fearing they might end up on the streets again if they do not. Jahara finds them and tries to kill Hak. However, Duran stalls her, telling Jahara about his friendship with Hak, and defends Hak until the Chasers rescue him. Finn realizes that there is a Tai Chi card nearby. However, Yuri has the card, and it is the "like" card. After Rai obtains the card, Yuri runs away from both pets, feeling afraid. The Dragonoid and Tigeroid teams fight after Yuri leaves, and the Chasers win, which allows both "pets" go to their right home. For failing to kill Hak, General Mischka decides to punish Jahara, since she did not return with the Tai Chi card, but instead brought the "pathetic creature" (Duran). Mishka coldly attacks Jahara with a powerful Tai Chi blast, which knocks her to the floor in pain. However, this angers Duran, since he believes that Jahara saved his life. Later, Jahara talks to Duran alone, telling him that she likes having him around, even though he is annoying.
| 15 | "Road to Ruin" (Korean: 용감무쌍 폭풍의 자매들) | 5 August 2007 | 18 February 2012 |
General Mischka crashes a Tigeroid Airship all by himself, using his Tai Chi cards. Afterward, he collects all of the Tai Chi Characters on the downed ship. He begins questioning his new team about its inability to defeat the Tai Chi Chasers - Mischka considers the Chasers to be a "rag tag team of Tigeroids." Hannah calls Sena and tells her that the family is having another reunion. Sena is upset by this. When Rai asks why, Tori says that when Sena's sisters get together, it is not a reunion, it is a war. The Chasers are about to split up to find the Tai Chi Character when the sisters show up and tell the kids to go back to the ship, so that they can find the card themselves. Rai says they are not leaving and the race to find the Tai Chi card is on. The Chasers are at a disadvantage because the place is booby trapped, but during the challenge the sisters are trapped by Ave and the Chasers have to save them. After that the teams work with each other instead of against each other. For failing, Ave is sent back to Suhn by General Mischka, to receive punishment.
| 16 | "Scream of a Dream" (Korean: 일장춘몽 꿈같은 시간이여) | 12 August 2007 | 25 February 2012 |
During the mission, the "dream" Tai Chi is activated which traps everyone in the town, including some of the dragonoid troops, in dreams from which they will not wake up. The Chasers use a bubble to stop the Tai Chi affecting them, but when the bubble bursts Rai ends up seeing Tori's, Sena's, and Donha's dreams. Rai is unaffected because he has the break card and tries to snap them out but it does not work. Finn is the only other one unaffected because he says he does not have dreams. Hak calls Rai and tells him that everyone's dreams will turn into their nightmares, the card will absorb everyone's nightmares and these nightmares will become real. A Nightmare Monster appears and Rai loses the break card. Finn is the only one left unaffected, but Masked Warrior arrives and snaps Rai out of his dream and gives him the card to stop the dream Tai Chi. Later, on the airship, Rai starts to piece together the identity of the Masked Warrior.
| 17 | "A Tori Story" (Korean: 일희일비(一喜一悲) 슬픔이여 안녕) | 19 August 2007 | 3 March 2012 |
The Tai Chi Chasers visit the orphanage where Tori grew up, only to discover that his young friends think Tori's a world-renowned super-star. To make matters worse, the "sad" Tai Chi Character converges during Tori's performance, making everybody sad except for Tori, even as Garnia attacks, with his new "slow" Tai Chi card. Because of this, only Tori is able to stop the convergence and retrieve the card. Tori manages to stop the convergence and obtains the Tai Chi Character. This causes everybody to stop crying, although they can't remember what they were so upset about. After obtaining the character, Rai's attack sets Garnia's "skirt" on fire, after tossing him over the orphanage boundary, causing Garnia to retreat in a panic. Believing all of this to be part of the performance, Tori's friends cheer him on, and ask him to continue his songs, which the Chasers secretly believe need improvement.
| 18 | "A Hideous Turn of Events" (Korean: 오매불망(寤寐不忘) 소중한 내 친구들) | 26 August 2007 | 10 March 2012 |
The Tai Chi Chasers come across a card that erases memories and everyone but Rai and Donha are affected. Meanwhile Ave returns to the dragonoids, but he has been controlled by General Mischka, using the forbidden Hyun "monstrous" Character. This warps Ave, greatly enhancing his strength but also turning him into a mindless monster. When Ave asks Jahara to hand over the Tigeroids' characters, she replies that she left them alone because of what Mischka had done to Ave. As a result of Jahara's betrayal, Mischka orders Ave to kill both Donha and Jahara. The Tigeroids are unable to defeat Ave for long, and Rai is knocked out of the Tigeroid Airship. However, Rai is able to obtain the character and stop the convergence, which shocks General Mischka. Jahara manages to send both herself and Ave back to their base, while using the Tai Chi Yeon "smoke" character to cover their retreat. General Mischka decides to punish Jahara for treason, despite Luka's protests. Before her punishment, Jahara asks Luka to remember her. Then, Jahara cries out in dismay at the character Mischka uses on her, for "punishment."
| 19 | "A Fleeting Friendship" (Korean: 오월동주 혼란 속에 핀 우정) | 2 September 2007 | 17 March 2012 |
At the Luftdrake, General Mischka sends Jahara (who fainted from her "punishment) back to Suhn, to receive her real punishment from Emperor Diga. While searching for a Tai Chi card, both Rai and Luka get trapped in another dimension and must work together to get out, even as Ave attacks them.
| 20 | "Family Time" (Korean: 시공초월 그리운 엄마 아빠) | 9 September 2007 | 24 March 2012 |
During a battle with Ave, The Shi "time" Tai Chi card converges, sending the Tai Chi Chasers into the past. While Donha, Finn, Tori and Hak are sent back to prehistoric times, Rai, Sena and Ave are not sent as far back and meet Rai's parents. Ave continues to attack Rai and Sena. Luva, Rai's father, shows Rai an incomplete painting depicting a fighting Tiger and Dragon. In the end, Rai's father, Luva is able to use his special Shim ("caring") Tai Chi card, to reverse the monstrous Hyun character controlling Ave (Rai's father was able to activate the character without a card activator, just like Rai), just before the "Hyun" Character destroys Ave's body completely. When Ave snaps out of his confusion and tries to take the Time card, it converges again, and sends the Tai Chi Chasers back into the present, with the Time card in the possession of Rai. However, Ave is left in the past and is transformed into a child by the converging Time character, and seems to remember nothing about being a Dragonoid. In the present-day run-down house of Rai, Luva's painting now shows the Tai Chi King standing in between the fighting Dragon and Tiger.
| 21 | "Misfit Marauders" (Korean: 예측불허 용황돌격대) | 16 September 2007 | 31 March 2012 |
The Tai Chi Chasers enter a secret base and meet other Tigeroids. Meanwhile, the Dragonoid Emperor Diga sends his Dragonoid Assault Squad to deal with the Tigeroids.
| 22 | "A Chilling Reunion" (Korean: 한래서왕 설원에 피어나는 온기) | 23 September 2007 | 7 April 2012 |
The Tai Chi Chasers obtain the Tigeroid's final Tai Chi Character (except for the Characters that General Mischka captured in Episode 15): Sa, the Tigeroids' "heat" character. This allows them to stop a convergence that would have cooked an entire city. While escorting Elder Sid to the Sage's conference, the Tai Chi Chasers are attacked by Luka and Garnia. Jahara also returns, but she is now under the control of the Hyun "Hideous" character that General Mischka has inflicted on her. As a result, she now attacks both the Tigeroids and the Dragonoids.
| 23 | "Operation Dragon Strike!, Part 1" (Korean: 정면돌파 루프트드라케 공격 작전) | 30 September 2007 | 14 April 2012 |
The Tai Chi Chasers must find a way to take down the Lightning Shield surrounding the Luftdrake (The Dragonoid base on Earth), despite the intense lightning protecting the shield generator. Also, the Dragon Assault Squad begins attacking the Tigeroids' Airships.
| 24 | "Operation Dragon Strike!, Part 2" (Korean: 살신성인 아름다운 전우애) | 7 October 2007 | 21 April 2012 |
The Tigeroids begin their attack on the Dragonoid base, the Luftdrake. However, entering the Luftdrake turns out to be a death trap, set up by both Emperor Diga and General Mischka. Note: In the 4Kids-dubbed English version, the scene that actually shows Garnia dying to save Jahara is cut. Because of this, viewers of the episode are unable to see the scene where Garnia is destroyed by the Hyun character, and instead see a flash of light, after hearing Garnia scream.
| 25 | "Out of Character" (Korean: 풍전등화 비밀기지를 사수하라) | 14 October 2007 | 28 April 2012 |
After the Tigeroids manage to escape the Luftdrake, they receive a call from their base signaling that it is under attack. However, the Tigeroid Airships won't be able to make it back to the unprotected base, even at maximum speed. Tori uses his "fast" Tai Chi card on the Chasers' Airship, allowing it to move way ahead of the others. It is too late, since the Dragonoids Jakata and Dag have already entered the base and begun attacking, moving directly towards the base's Character chamber. When the Tai Chi Chasers finally get there, Tori passes out from using his fast card too many times, and the Tigeroid airship is attacked by Terra and Lita. The Tigeroid Airship loses its main engine and crashes, preventing them from getting to the Tigeroid base. Sena and Donha stay behind to deal with Terra and Lita, while Finn and Rai head to the base. Meanwhile, Komorka manages to stall Jakata and Dag, by trapping them with the Ahm "darkness" card. However, when Hannah shows up, Jakata manages to capture them forcing Komorka to release the Dragonoids from her Darkness card, and bring them to the Character Chamber. When Jakata notices the chamber is empty, he demands to know where Komorka hid them, until he finds the Tai Chi Characters disguised, as Hannah's bow tie, which they manage to steal. Rai comes into the room and fights Jakata, while Dag escapes with the Tai Chi Characters. Rai manages to injure Jakata severely, before chasing after Dag. Outside the base, Sena and Donha manage to defeat Terra and Lita, reverting them into dolls. Back inside the base, Finn is fighting the Dragonoid robots when he sees Dag fly by, taking the robots with him. Rai uses the woo/wing card to give chase after Dag, even though Komorka warns him not to. As Rai leaves, Jakata escapes in a bad condition, and vows that the fight is not over yet. Rai manages to get past the Dragonoid robots, and confronts General Mischka himself. Mischka uses the Yi "Movement" card to evade Rai's attacks, and then tells Rai he will fight him another time. The Dragonoids get away. Later, General Mischka defeats Dag (which reverts him into a doll), when he does not immediately give Mischka the Tigeroids' Tai Chi Characters. Mischka then laughs, saying that he now has both the Dragonoids' and the Tigeroid's Characters, which makes him close to becoming the Tai Chi King. Back at the Tigeroid base, Rai is placed under arrest, due to an accusation of being a Dragonoid spy, as the Tigeroids have observed Rai using the "Wing" card, a card that only a Dragonoid should be able to use.
| 26 | "Gate to Destiny" (Korean: 자중지란 친구인가 적인가) | 21 October 2007 | 5 May 2012 |
General Mischka returns to Suhn, in order to begin his conquest of the Universe. When he arrives, 2 Dragonoid ships chase after him. However, General Mischka uses his newly gained Tai Chi Characters to crash both ships, since he knew that Emperor Diga has learnt of his plan to become the Tai Chi King. Lord Gherba (Diga's personal guard) then informs Emperor Diga of Mischka's betrayal. Diga flies into a rage, and orders Gherba to hunt Mischka down and retrieve the lost Characters, using whatever means necessary. Meanwhile, Rai is accused of being a Dragonoid spy and sentenced to petrification, by the Tigeroid Elder Pyron. The truth about Rai is revealed. Rai is part Dragonoid. However, the other Chasers manage to help Rai escape, along with help from the Masked Tigeroid. When Elder Pyron discovers that the Tai Chi Chasers were helping Rai escape, he orders his Tigeroid soldiers to arrest them all. The other Tigeroids, except those under Pyron's command, also try to help the Chasers escape. The Chasers head to the Gate Room, because that is the only way they can escape to Suhn, to stop General Mischka. Meanwhile, the Masked Tigeroid sets a fire in the main generator room, which temporarily distracts Pyron. Along the way, Hannah tricks a squad of Pyron's soldiers into running down the wrong hallway, which prevents the Chasers from being caught. Elder Pyron and his soldiers manage to catch up to the Chasers in the Gate Room. Elder Komorka convinces Elder Pyron (the only elder who believes Rai to be guilty) to let Rai and the Tai Chi Chasers go. Rai and the other Chasers escape to the Tigeroid/Dragonoid homeworld of Suhn, through the activated portal. Note: This episode is the conclusion to the 4-part Season 2 finale on Toonzai and the final episode dubbed by 4KidsTV before their bankruptcy in 2012.

=== Season 3 (2007–08) ===
| No. | Title | Original release date |
|---|---|---|
| 27 | " (Korean: 천방지축 괴짜 소녀 비비)" | 28 October 2007 |
General Mischka lands in a forest in Suhn with the Tigeroids' Tai Chi characters, which he now wears as a pendant around his neck. Meanwhile, the Chasers arrive on the Island of the Spirits, but with the help of the old dynasty has sent care of the door Taeguek to prevent any help from Hak in finding the Spirit King. Lord Gherba, Diga's right-hand man, sends a search group to find Jakata, who tell him to assist the search team or he will be reverted to a doll, but he refuses because he wants revenge himself on Mischka, and strikes out on his own. On the Island of the Spirits, Phoebe (Luka's younger sister), a Dragonoid girl, shows up with the Fa Flower character. She ignores a warning from her tutor saying that they should now go for the future and not let it get away. Phoebe leaves and Rai goes after her, wanting to know where the Spirit King is, but he is suddenly attacked a group of monsters. Then Phoebe appears and the monsters became docile as pets and obey Phoebe. The animals were nice, but then, things were changing. Rai discovers that Phoebe has his activator. The forest fires on the other side of the island cause Phoebe to be concerned for her animal friends, and Rai starts worrying about his teammates and follows Phoebe. When they enter the forest, they find a vengeful Jakata, who started the fire in order to smoke out Mischka.
| 28 | " (Korean: 기상천외 로로아 장로배 달리기 대회)" | 4 November 2007 |
Phoebe takes the other Chasers to her home where she was raised. They suddenly run into Luka. Phoebe is happy to see him because he's her brother, but not Rai. They also meet Master Loren. Hak and Duran reunite and are happy to see each other again. Jahara comes out of the room with her pupils restored. Master Loren asks Phoebe to remain safe with himself, but Rai has made her the sixth member of the team and calls Master Loren "Old Man". Master Loren challenges all the Chasers to a track race. General Jarrriel stops by and says that he has been blacked out by Mischka. He also joins the race. Jarriel keeps getting hit. Rai is dismayed that Master Loren is beating him. Phoebe constructs a finish line near by lava. Jarriel, upset about losing, threatens and attacks Rai but fails and almost falls into lava. Master Loren appears and tells Rai he's leaving the work to Rai. Rai saves Jarriel's life. Loren restores a bridge that was damaged. Finn wins, but Tori and Sena crash, and Donha has over-eaten wild berries. Phoebe says she can stay under one condition; Rai and Luka have to get along. Jarriel wants to go see what his father "General Bob" is doing. Master Loren warns Rai that if Dragonoid's and Tigeroid's Tai Chi Characters were put together, the universe will become corrupted. Master Loren offers Luka a chance to travel with the Chasers. Meanwhile surrounded by Bob's bots, Bob tries to turn Mischka over to the Emperor. Mischka escapes with a Tai Chi Card.
| 29 | " (Korean: 용호상박 멀고도 가까운 사이)" | 11 November 2007 |
Luka tells Jahara that he is going somewhere important. The Chasers are packed and ready to travel on foot. In the mountains, Luka goes ahead of them. Phoebe tells Luka to slow down and Tori sprains his ankle. Luka is forced to go back. Phoebe uses her Healing Card, and Luka bandages Tori's leg. Luka tells Rai how he became a warrior - it was his ancestors who raised him. Tori complains that they are Tigeroids. Donha thinks about going to McDonald's to eat Chicken Nuggets in Suhn. Phoebe has an idea about where the Tigeroids can eat and grow. Phoebe explains that her mother was killed by Emperor Diga. She initially says a cobra bit her mother, but later admits that her Mother was impaled by Diga for escaping Suhn. Rai cheers her up by promising he'll bring Emperor Diga to justice. Meanwhile at Bob and Jarriel's warship, Jakata asks Bob if he can have the Tai Chi Armour. Jakata uses the Tai Chi Cards that were from his siblings to buy the armour. Donha and Phoebe are cooking but Phoebe makes a lot of mistakes. Donha cheers Phoebe up. Phoebe thinks adding extra salt and hot sauce will help. Rai gets mad at Phoebe and Luka, and dumps Phoebe. Phoebe tells the story about Mischka and Luka. Phoebe wishes to be like her brother. Rai then says his mother is probably imprisoned in Northern Suhn which makes Phoebe cry. Luka senses Jakata wearing his armor. He tries to use a Tai Chi card, and Phoebe tries to attack Jakata with her Flower Card but fails. Jakata starts off with the Yul Heat character. Rai tries to attack but fails. Luka tells Rai to protect his sister. The rest of the Cthasers try to use their cards, but in vain. The armour knows The Chasers' every move. Luka passes Garnia's Pok Explosion card to Rai. Phoebe feels better and learns how to cook.
| 30 | " (Korean: 막상막하 천자문 경연 대회)" | 18 November 2007 |
Mischka has wandered into a mystical cave that leads to the Spirit tree. As for the Tai Chi Chasers, Phoebe leads them to the Spirit neighborhood where all the spirit animals live, which explains it was Hak and Duran's home. The next test is located there. Luka, Phoebe, and Duran go to the Dragon side and the other Chasers go on the Tiger side. When Hak arrives, his parents beat him up, as do Duran's parents to Duran. It is their culture. As they eat, Hak spots his friends. A strange bell rings; it is the union bell ringing that triggers the spirits challenging each other. Rai thinks they fight like elementary schoolers, and tries to break the fight up, but he gets tortured. Suddenly, the prayer walls speak. The next test is the "Tai Chi Olympics" hosted by Tori. While they play, General Jarriel spies on them. The prayer walls break down and Tori tells everyone, including General Jarriel, that they are winners. Jarriel has brought his troops to attack. The spirits scare Jarriel. Meanwhile at the mystical cave, Mischka passes through security and is called a trespasser by the princesses.
| 31 | " (Korean: 와신상담 쟈카타의 대반격)" | 25 November 2007 |
As Hak and Duran's father leaves, Luka still wants to confront Mischka. Jakata tells Lord Gherba about his concerns, but Lord Gherba tells him to toughen up. Humiliated, Jakata immediately hangs up. As The Neo Tai Chi Chasers travel, they get tired and stop near a waterfall. Tori is concerned about camping with Phoebe again. Phoebe asks Tori for some funny jokes, but Sena stops Tori from telling them. Rai and Luka look for food with Donha, but the fruits are sharp. They think Luka can help, but he refuses. A Dragonoid ship passes above them. They think it is Jarriel. Lord Gherba asks Bob and Jarriel to call a search party for Mischka and Jakata. Jarriel vows to go and hold Phoebe to ransom. When the Chasers go to the campsite, they see Phoebe crying. Sena says that Tori told Phoebe an offensive "Yo Mama Joke." After they eat, They let Phoebe do the chores due to the fact that Dragonoids are hard to trust. Phoebe complains about not being trusted and blames it on Luka. Jakata spies on the Neo Tai Chi Chasers and kidnaps Phoebe while she's alone. Hak and Duran warn everyone that Phoebe has been kidnapped. Luka gets angrier when he hears of it, and Rai vows to go find her. Phoebe is in Jakata's Volcanic Lair. Jakata insults Phoebe's master. Jakata tells Phoebe his story - he was brought to life by Shing the Birth Tai Chi with his 4 siblings. Phoebe thinks he's joking. Phoebe gets angry when he calls her "Chick" again. Phoebe refuses to be with people who attack nature. Jakata is looking for Mischka but is unable to locate him. Phoebe insults Jakata, who tells her to shut up, making her cry. Rai asks Luka for Su the Water Tai Chi in case of an emergency. Phoebe is seen tied up with a chain Tai Chi. Rai appears and releases Phoebe. Jakata battles Rai in a volcano. Rai tries to use his new Tai Chi but fails. He tries a combo with the Hwa card, but the volcano makes Jakata stronger. Jakata creates a lava monster to attack Rai, who escapes it. During the battle, General Jarriel appears holding Phoebe for ransom. Jakata creates another monster to attack General Jarriel. Jakata tries to attack Rai with multiple monsters, but Rai defends with Luka's Water card. Rai tries to finish Jakata off, but Phoebe asks Rai if Jakata can join the Tai Chi Chasers due to his toughness. Rai gives Luka his water card back after the battle. Mischka finally arrives at the Spirit Tree. The Princesses try to freeze Mischka, but he kills the Princesses instead. Mischka is now one step closer to being legendary. Note: This is the second Tai Chi Chasers episode to not release on Saturday (the first was "An Amazing Discovery", which was aired in the U.S. on 17 September 2011).
| 32 | " (Korean: 점입가경 정령왕 동굴에서의 결전)" | 2 December 2007 |
When Mischka was 18 and in training class, he was appearing for his final exam in combat. He thought he was the best, but Luka had taken down every robot with his water card. Luka graduates while Mischka remains formless. In the present, Mischka is in the Spirit Tree doing a ritual. The Original Chasers leave Phoebe behind because she might get hurt. They finally reach the spirit tree. Meanwhile, Phoebe tries to prove her toughness by jumping off a cliff but hurts herself. Meanwhile at Bob's airship, they take Jakata to Gherba. Jakata wakes up and destroys a wall with his heat card. At the spirit tree, Mischka transforms the tigeroid Tai Chi Characters into tablet form. Jakata breaks in trying to attack Mischka, but Mischka deflects. Lord Gherba reveals where Mischka is and Diga goes after him. Rai hears voices in his head telling him the princesses are in trouble and warns the others. Bob tries to challenge the Chasers. Luka says he will battle his teacher while the original Tai Chi Chasers battle Mischka. Phoebe is stuck in a valley with no one to help her until an injured Jakata arrives. Phoebe uses her healing card on Jakata and takes care of him. Jakata flirts with Phoebe which makes her mad. Jakata walks away during recovery. In the spirit tree, the Chasers encounter Mischka. Mischka shows the petrified princesses and uses Co the Curse Tai Chi on the tablet. While Rai, Sena, and Fin take on Mischka, Donha and Tori try to help the princesses. Bob injures Luka with Jay the Flail card but Luka does not go down. With Mischka, he has the ability to use 500 different Tai Chi symbols. Sena distracts Mischka by physically attacking him while Rai uses his tai chi card. But Mischka deflects it and gives Sena a concussion. Mischka roasts the tigeroids, ticking Finn off. Finn wants Rai's Army Card. The Army card corrupts and overpowers him instead. A light flashes across the entire tree. Finn is exhausted. Rai is able to defeat Mischka with his wing and explosion tai chi. Emperor Diga then appears to destroy the tigeroids.
| 33 | " (Korean: 마각노출 가면전사의 정체)" | 9 December 2007 |
Sena's sisters and her teammates confront Diga and his plans to kill everyone while Rai learns the truth about the Masked Tigeroid. Jakata is now possessed by Mischka.
| 34 | " (Korean: 견리망의 여기저기 배신자)" | 16 December 2007 |
Komorka starts worrying about the Tai Chi Chasers, now the Neo Tai Chi Chasers, and so does Hannah. Stephanie (a Tigeroid Councilor) receives a notification from Asty. Asty tells Komorka that the Tai Chi Chasers got the 2nd Tai Chi Characters (The Dragonoid's Tai Chi Characters). The council blesses Rai for retrieving the 2nd Tai Chi Characters. Rai tells Komorka that his mother was the Masked Warrior. Rai still misses his father. As Elder Pyron, Sid, and General Aiden walk in, Rai shows them the 2nd Tai Chi Characters. Elder Pyron finally forgives the Tai Chi Chasers. Sid says he will wait at the gate. Komorka thinks something fishy is going on with Sid. As they walk back to Phoebe's house, Rai gets a flashback (from Episode 20 and 33). Phoebe is worried about Rai. They both have lost their parents, but she says "It's time to move on." Tori cheers everyone up. The council on Earth changes the rules which were made up by Emperor Diga in Episode 26. Komorka sends Hannah to Suhn at dawn. Luka and Donha check on Jahara to see how she's doing. She seems like she is healing. Rai sees Luka practicing his sword fighting and joins in to practice for taking revenge against Diga who took his mother to the North. Rai and Luka start talking about their parents. Meanwhile in the bamboo forest, Finn is talking to Sid. Hannah arrives at Suhn and wakes Rai up (like how his mother used to wake him up). He sees General Zushen too, who has brought a gift for the Chasers, their airship. Finn brings in the box where the 2nd Tai Chi Characters were stored. Asty uses Gah the Portal card. As they leave, Hannah teases Rai again about his activator. He reveals to Hannah he has 2 (Luka gave Rai Garnia's Activator). At the base, Komorka tells troops that there is something fishy. They head for the Gate to Suhn. Sid wants to go to Suhn but Pyron wouldn't let him. They attack each other. Komorka saves Pyron. Then Sid smoke screens them with Bing the Ice Tai Chi and gets away. Hannah arrives with the box. When Komorka opens the box, she curses him. When Hannah looks inside, the contents are gone. The Chasers get an emergency call from Komorka that there is a spy on the ship and look for him. Rai finds Finn leaving the airship. They find out Finn is the spy. Rai goes after Finn but Finn blows Rai off. As Finn returns to the island of spirits, he gives Elder Sid The 2nd Tai Chi Characters. In the North, the Dragonoid Elders are in a sages conference when Lord Gherba comes in.
| 35 | " (Korean: 인지상정 우정와 운명 사이)" | 23 December 2007 |
Finn and Elder Sid have apparently betrayed them but Rai doesn't want to believe it. His friends tell him that is only a human-looking machine, created by Gherba to achieve his ends: to create a new world. For his part, Gherba will betray his king, Diga, during a show of force with his new androids. He finds himself at the head of the Dragonoids. His ultimate goal is to bring together the Dragonoid and Tigeroid peoples so that a new world can emerge. But he needs Rai's power. With the help of Sid the Elder and Finn, will he manage to rally Rai to his cause? The birth of this new world has already entailed so many sacrifices.
| 36 | " (Korean: 역지사지 호족과 용족의 정의)" | 30 December 2007 |
Rai and his friends prepares for the final hours.
| 37 | " (Korean: 교우이신 믿음으로 지킨 우정)" | 6 January 2008 |
As war rages between Tiegroids and Dragonoids, Phoebe and Luka confront Mischka. They manage to wake up Jakata who regains control of her body by returning to the doll state. Luka manages to get rid of Jahara's monstrous symbol. The Tai Chi Chasers manage to get Finn back into their group, but Rai learns that Lord Gherba is none other than his father, Luva.
| 38 | " (Korean: 혈육의 정 아버지와 아들)" | 13 January 2008 |
Diga manages to escape. He informs Luva that he was the one who manipulated him from the start by inciting him to hate thanks to a Tai Chi card. Then he merges with all the Tai Chi symbols and turns into a monstrous corruption dragon. With the help of the King of Spirits, Rai and his friends will have to destroy the Tai Chi symbols to defeat the emperor.
| 39 | " (Korean: 태극왕 선계의 평화여 영원하라)" | 20 January 2008 |
Rai has sworn to protect the unreal world, echoing his father's hopes. But the task is difficult. Diga, transformed into a Dragon attacks Dragonoids and Tigeroids alike. They unite against the Monster, but its powers have become immense and make it almost invulnerable. However, Rai will succeed, with the indispensable help of the resistance. These trials will have seen the birth of the new Tai Chi King, and a new hope for lasting peace in the world. Note: This episode is the conclusion to the Northern Suhn Arc in Season 3.

== See also ==
- South Korean animation
