= Pat & Stan =

- Pat and Stan
- Pat and Stan
- Genre: Animation; Comedy
- Created by: Pierre Coffin
- Directed by: Pierre Coffin; Patrick Delage (movie)
- Voices of: English: Dan Green; David Wills; Sean Schemmel; Bella Hudson; Evelyn Lanto; Bryan Tyler
- Countries of origin: France; Germany
- Original language: French
- No. of seasons: 3
- No. of episodes: 39 (+ 29 specials)

Production
- Executive producer: Jean-Jacques Benhamou (movie)
- Producers: Jean-Jacques Benhamou; Jacques Bled (movie)
- Running time: 7 minutes 2–3 minutes (shorts); 26 minutes (special)
- Production companies: Mac Guff Ligne; TV-Loonland AG

Original release
- Network: TF1
- Release: 2004 – January 10, 2010

Pat et Stanley (English: Pat & Stan, Italian: Pat e Stan, Dutch: Pat en Stan, Danish: Nik og Jan, Serbian: Pet i Sten/Petko i Stanko) is an animated series that appeared as part of the children's television programme TFOU on the French network TF1. The show is animated by Mac Guff and created by Pierre Coffin.

Pat and Stan have appeared in 39 short episodes, as well as the 2006 26-minute special Pat et Stanley: Le Trésor de Pit et Mortimer (Pat and Stanley: The Treasure of Pit and Mortimer).

== Characters ==
=== Main ===
- Patrick "Pat" Hippo (voiced by Dan Green) - a pink anthropomorphic hippopotamus. He is lazy, sometimes clumsy and often plays pranks on Stan. He likes video games.
- Stanley "Stan" Dog (voiced by David Wills) - a yellow anthropomorphic beagle. He likes to clean the house where he lives with Pat. He is rather grumpy and is in love with Stephanie.

=== Recurring ===
- Aunt Martha (voiced by Carrie Keranen) - an anthropomorphic pig. She is an aunt.
- Professor Chi-Chi (voiced by Bryan Fenkart) - a anthropomorphic rat who spends his days inventing machines that cause damage, especially when Pat and Stan use them. He does not like to be disturbed when he works in his laboratory.
- Stephanie (voiced by Bella Hudson) - an orange anthropomorphic cat. She is a painter and does yoga, She is the girlfriend of Stan and Pat.
- Emily (voiced by Bella Hudson) - a brown anthropomorphic mole.
- Lilli (Voiced by Carrie Keranen) - a white anthropomorphic rabbit. She is the girlfriend of Stuart.
- Stuart (voiced by Sean Schemmel) - a white anthropomorphic sloth. He is the best friend of Pat and Stan.
- Momo - an orange bunny. He is the son of Lilli.
- Brutox - is a anthropomorphic pig who steals stuff from his classmate Professor Chi-Chi. He appears on "Super Loser".
- The Chickens - They are chicken triplets.
- The Elephants - They are elephant triplets.

== Episodes ==
=== Series overview ===
| Season | Episodes | Originally aired | |
| Season | Episodes | Season premiere | Season finale |
|---|---|---|---|
| 1 | 13 | 2004 | 2005 |
| 2 | 13 | 2006 | 2007 |
| 3 | 13 | 2008 | 2009 |

=== Season 1 (2004-05) ===
| No. in series | No. in season | Title | Directed by | Written by | Storyboard by | Air date |
|---|---|---|---|---|---|---|
| 1 | 1 | "Bath Time" "Jour de bain" | Pierre Coffin; Marco Allard | Pierre Coffin | Marco Allard | TBA |
It is April 11 - Stan's bath day. Despite Pat's insistence, he decides not to cooperate for a wash and scrub because he hates it.
| 2 | 2 | "Cyber Stuart" "Cyber Jean-Luc" | Pierre Coffin; Gark | Gark | David Berthier | TBA |
Pat plays an engrossing video game in the living room - but must avoid becoming a telly addict.
| 3 | 3 | "Mosquito Warning" "Attention moustique" | Pierre Coffin; Piano | Lionel Moreau | Eric Delbecq | TBA |
Stan is happy as he is going to be on the front page of the next day's paper along with Professor Chi Chi and his new invention.
| 4 | 4 | "Wild Camping" "Camping très sauvage" | Pierre Coffin; Marco Allard | Hervé Nicourt; Laurent Nicourt | Didier Ah-Koon; Marco Allard | TBA |
Pat is excited about going camping, but Stan is less than enthusiastic.
| 5 | 5 | "The Pool" "La piscine" | Pierre Coffin; Romain Segaud | Lionel Moreau | David Berthier | TBA |
Stan decides to dig a pool in the back garden.
| 6 | 6 | "Pat & Stan Artists!" "Pat et Stan artistes" | Pierre Coffin; Samuel Tourneux | Fred Lebollec’h | Hervé Barbereau | TBA |
| 7 | 7 | "My Friend Helmut" "Mon ami Helmut" | Pierre Coffin; Laurent Nicolas | Nicolas Gallet | Didier Ah-Koon | TBA |
Stan listens to music full blast, much to the annoyance of Pat, who is worried about keeping things quiet for Helmut, his virtual pet.
| 8 | 8 | "Super Loser" "Super Blaireaux" | Pierre Coffin; Laurent Nicolas | Hervé Eparvier | Didier Ah-Koon | TBA |
The professor is sleeping soundly but a shadow breaks suddenly into his lab.
| 9 | 9 | "The Death of Norbert" "La disparition de Norbert" | Pierre Coffin; Piano | Hervé Eparvier | Eric Delbecq | TBA |
Pat and Stan decide to go to the seaside for the weekend with Stephanie, but at the last minute Stan realises he has forgotten Norbert, his stuffed animal.
| 10 | 10 | "Pat Keeps the Rabbits" "Pat, garde lapins" | Pierre Coffin; Samuel Tourneux | Lionel Moreau | Hervé Barbereau | TBA |
Momo gets the measles, so Pat and Stan babysit him along with the rest of Lili's litter.
| 11 | 11 | "Double Pat" "Double Pat" | Pierre Coffin; Alexandre Hesse | Hervé Eparvier | Florent Sabourin; Marco Allard | TBA |
The lawn needs to be mowed, the trash emptied, window frames painted, and the garage cleaned. Stan is up for it but Pat prefers to be lazy and play video games.
| 12 | 12 | "A Button on the Nose" "Un bouton sur le nez" | Pierre Coffin; Gark | Hervé Eparvier | Didier Ah-Koon | TBA |
One morning Stan notices that he has got a pimple on his nose.
| 13 | 13 | "The Band Wagon" "Tous en scène" | Pierre Coffin; Gark | Catherine Bernet; Romain Victor-Pujebet | Didier Ah-Koon | TBA |
The pair rehearse a play written by Stephanie.

=== Season 2 (2006-07) ===
| No. in series | No. in season | Title | Directed by | Written by | Storyboard by | Air date |
|---|---|---|---|---|---|---|
| 14 | 1 | "The Gamma Zapper" "La zapette gamma" | Pierre Coffin; Benoît Féroumont | Gark; Joël Couttausse | Didier Ah-Koon | TBA |
| 15 | 2 | "Babysitters" "Baby-sitter" | Pierre Coffin; Alexandre Hesse | Joël Bassaget | Eric Delbecq; Nicolas Moschini | TBA |
The duo are asked to babysit Lili's kids, but they lose the bunnies.
| 16 | 3 | "Stuart Does Everything" "Jean-Luc fait tout" | Pierre Coffin; Samuel Tourneux | Joël Bassaget | Hervé Barbereau | TBA |
The friends manage to turn every event into the craziest of adventures - but jeopardise the football match.
| 17 | 4 | "Aunt Martha Moves" "Tante Marthe s'installe" | Pierre Coffin; Piano | Joël Bassaget | Eric Delbecq | TBA |
While her house is being renovated Aunt Martha is staying with her nephews. Between the morning aerobics, grocery shopping, gardening and cleaning sessions, her stay is turning into a bit of a nightmare for Pat and Stan. Professor Chichi offers his help to Stan as it's the perfect opportunity for the Professor to test his latest invention: the Psycho-switch! This revolutionary device can influence peoples' behaviour and change their personality. Stan thinks this can potentially turn Aunt Martha into a "cool" aunt but the invention backfires and it's Stan who becomes the guinea pig of this new invention!
| 18 | 5 | "Roll With It" "Roule ma poule" | Pierre Coffin; Samuel Tourneux | Nicolas Gallet | Eric Delbecq | TBA |
Pat's latest book gives him confidence.
| 19 | 6 | "True-False Bobo" "Vrai faux bobo" | Pierre Coffin; Laurent Nicolas | Fred Lebollec’h | Eric Delbecq | TBA |
Pat fakes being sick in order to escape having to go to Aunt Martha's with Stan. The problem is that Pat really becomes sick and the symptoms are not pretty: Pat's tail starts to grow to worrying proportions...
| 20 | 7 | "Sting Recall" "Piqûre de rappel" | Pierre Coffin; Gark | Elisabeth Patte | David Berthier | TBA |
Stan is sleeping as Pat barges in announcing that Lili just called. She will be there shortly to give him his flea shot. Not a great day for Stan...but that's the least of his worries. This very day keeps on repeating itself everytime he wakes up! Stan is going to have to learn to adapt!
| 21 | 8 | "Stephanie Love" "Stéphanie amoureuse" | Pierre Coffin; Laurent Nicolas | Elisabeth Patte; Joël Couttausse | David Berthier | TBA |
Stephanie is hiding something, and may be in love.
| 22 | 9 | "MicroStan" "Microstan" | Pierre Coffin; Laurent Nicolas | Piano; Joël Couttausse | David Berthier | TBA |
Stan has a meeting with Professor Chi Chi.
| 23 | 10 | "The Hamster of Bengal" "Le hamster du Bengale" | Pierre Coffin; Laurent Nicolas | Pierre Coffin | Eric Delbecq | TBA |
Stephanie and Pat offer Stan a hamster to help calm him down.
| 24 | 11 | "In Search of Lost Treasure" "À la recherche du trésor perdu" | Pierre Coffin; Laurent Nicolas | Joël Bassaget | Eric Delbecq | TBA |
Aunt Martha comes across a strange map in an antique store which may lead to secret lost treasures.
| 25 | 12 | "Pat & Stan Poles (part 1)" "Pat et Stan aux antipodes" | Pierre Coffin; Thomas Szabo | Patrick Galliano | Georges Abolin | TBA |
A meteorite falls into the garden of Pat and Stan and makes a big seemingly bottomless hole. As our heroes are debating in the garden about how deep the hole is, a loud sound startles them and causes them to jump in the hole.
| 26 | 13 | "Dig-o-Mania (part 2)" "Creusomania" | Pierre Coffin; Thomas Szabo | Patrick Galliano | Eric Delbecq | TBA |
Pat misplaces a key needed to help launch Professor Chi Chi's rocket.

=== Season 3 (2008-09) ===
| No. in series | No. in season | Title | Directed by | Written by | Storyboard by | Air date |
|---|---|---|---|---|---|---|
| 27 | 1 | "Stan Phone Home" "Stan téléphone maison" | Pierre Coffin; Alexandre Hesse | Hervé Eparvier | Didier Ah-Koon | TBA |
Pat plays at being an extra terrestrial, which annoys Stan.
| 28 | 2 | "Astro-Spountz" "Le cosmospountz" | Pierre Coffin; Elisabeth Patte; Fabien Polack | Elisabeth Patte | Eric Delbecq | TBA |
The pair decide to surprise Stephanie on her birthday.
| 29 | 3 | "One Night Dog" "Une nuit de chien" | Pierre Coffin; Gark | Lionel Moreau | David Berthier | TBA |
Professor Chi Chi arrives at Pat and Stan's in a panic and asks them if he can stay the night. He was fine-tuning an invention when BANG, his house and his laboratory exploded. Stan offers up his bed while he sleeps on the sofa in the living room. It's like sleeping on a bed of nails! To top it off professor Chi Chi is a sleepwalker... It's going to be a long, hard night!
| 30 | 4 | "The Return of Stuart" "Le retour de Jean-Luc" | Pierre Coffin; Alexandre Hesse | Lionel Moreau | Hervé Barbereau | TBA |
Stuart returns from his vacation. It's a bit of a surprise when he notices all his friends seem to be avoiding him. Down heartened, Stuart takes refuge with Pat and Stan who although hesitant at first, take him in. The truth is that all his friends are secretly preparing a surprise party for his return!
| 31 | 5 | "Aunt Martha Comes to Dinner" "Tante Marthe vient dîner" | Pierre Coffin; Laurent Nicolas | Lionel Moreau | Didier Ah-Koon | TBA |
With the help of Stuart, Pat and Stan invite Aunt Martha over for dinner. They want to ask for the keys to her house by the sea for the weekend. Operation: nephew charm!
| 32 | 6 | "Pat's Pet" "La bébête à Papat" | Pierre Coffin; Laurent Nicolas | Joël Bassaget | David Berthier | TBA |
Pat makes friends with a spider he finds in the attic. He decides to adopt it and names it Roro... to the great displeasure of Stan who refuses to live with an insect. Especially now the two friends are hosting a dinner the next day for friends. Chance has it that 'Roro' escapes from his jar that evening... causing panic amongst the guests!
| 33 | 7 | "Nasalation" "Liaison nasale" | Pierre Coffin; Laurent Nicolas | Nicolas Gallet | Didier Ah-Koon | TBA |
The mailman delivers a small package to Pat but Stan grabs it and runs away to open it himself! The package contains a perfume spray which the advertising boasts is 100% guaranteed, making everyone fall in love with whoever wears it. Stephanie won't be able to resist him... But the result is disastrous as everyone steers clear of Stan because of his horrendous smell!
| 34 | 8 | "A Short Break" "Une petite pause" | Pierre Coffin; Thomas Szabo | Nicolas Gallet | Didier Ah-Koon | TBA |
After the remote control overheats, Pat and Stan find themselves alone in the world.
| 35 | 9 | "The Great Vacation" "Les grandes vacances" | Pierre Coffin; Alexandre Hesse | Nicolas Gallet | Didier Ah-Koon | TBA |
Before leaving for vacation, Stan installs a high-tech alarm system to ward off thieves. The system is connected to an extremely intelligent super computer. While they're getting ready to take the car out of the garage Pat makes a blunder and all the alarm systems are engaged. Result: the house, piloted by the super computer, locks down all the doors and shutters. Pat and Stan find themselves imprisoned in their own house …
| 36 | 10 | "Egg Surprise" "Oeuf surprise" | Pierre Coffin; Alexandre Hesse | Joël Couttausse | Didier Ah-Koon | TBA |
Pat and Stan hunt for Easter eggs.
| 37 | 11 | "The Ghost of Aunt Patty" "Le fantôme de Mamy Madeleine" | Pierre Coffin; Benoît Féroumont | Hervé Eparvier | Hervé Barbereau | TBA |
Pat has just discovered a picture of his Mammy Madeleine in the attic. He proudly shows it to Stan and Stéphanie. He would really like to hang it in the living room but Stan adamantly refuses which leads to a battle between the two friends and the picture finishes up in pitiful state. Annoyed, Pat goes to see professor Chi Chi to feed his hamster and discovers a strange invisibility paint. With this he can avenge himself against Stan by being the ghost of Mammy Madeleine.
| 38 | 12 | "Scare Me If You Can" "Fais moi peur" | Pierre Coffin; Benoît Féroumont | Patrick Galliano | Hervé Barbereau | TBA |
Pat must win the singing competition at the neighbour's party. To gather strength, Pat swallows a whole sandwich and he's overcome by hiccups! Will he be able to get rid of the hiccups and participate in the competition?
| 39 | 13 | "Grand Hotel" "Grand hôtel" | Pierre Coffin; Benoît Féroumont | Joël Bassaget | Lionel Allaix | TBA |
The duo install a special antenna - but a great deal of damage is caused when it is struck by lightning.

=== Film (2006) ===
| Title | Directed by | Written by | Original release date |
|---|---|---|---|
| "Pat and Stan in The The Treasure of Pit and Mortimer" "Pat et Stanley: Le Trésor de Pit et Mortimer" | Pierre Coffin; Patrick Delage | Pierre Coffin; Fabien Welhman; Benoit Philippon; Marc Jolivet | 2006 |

== Broadcast ==
Outside France, the duo are most famous for the short clip in which Pat is seen singing "The Lion Sleeps Tonight". The clip appeared in Italy in a commercial by Ferrero's Kinder chocolates; they also produced a "Happy Hippo" shaped chocolate snack. It also appeared in Indonesia as a filler for a local TV channel based at Sukamara Regency, Central Kalimantan, Sukamara Jaya Television (SJTV), of which the original audio has been completely replaced with a dialogue in Banjarese that includes instances of body shaming.

Two English dubs have also been made, one broadcast on CITV and Pop in the United Kingdom, with Pat and Stan being voiced by Jay Simon and John Telfer respectively, and another on Kids' WB (later known as The CW4Kids and then, Toonzai) and also The Shorts on Cartoon Network in the United States, where Pat and Stan were voiced by Dan Green and David Wills respectively and under two Dutch versions on Jetix in the Netherlands and on Ketnet in Flanders. Pat and Stanley are now featured in many unofficial online videos singing English (as well as international) songs. It was on Cartoon Network's website from December 5, 2014 to April 11, 2015.

In October 9, 2008, it was reported that ITV had acquired and secured rights of the show to air and re-air on the CITV channel, ITV had acquired and secured rights of all readily available formats of the show since its conception in 2004 such as the 350 shorts of the show already made and the half-hour 'Treasure Hunt'' special, too. The 350 shorts of the show were scheduled to be put on the CITV website very soon but would not be making its debut TV launch in the then upcoming Christmas of the same year. ITV had also acquired the latest new series produced at the time consisting of 39 episodes in 7 minute formats to air in the spring of 2009 on the CITV channel.
