= David Wills (voice actor) =

American voice actor (born 1970)

- Born: September 28, 1970 (age 55); Maplewood, New Jersey, United States
- Other names: David Willis, Dave Wills
- Occupation: Voice actor
- Years active: 1992–present

David Wills (born September 28, 1970) is an American voice actor, who works with 4Kids Entertainment and NYAV Post. He was formerly a disc jockey under the name Ghosty for Sirius Satellite Radio and was the host of channel 118: Radio Classics under the name Dave Wills. Currently, he hosts That Modern Rock Show as Ghosty on Saturday nights from 9:00 PM to 1:00 AM EST on WFDU and its website.

== Filmography ==
=== Anime/Animation ===
- Angel's Friends - Additional Voices
- Celebrity Deathmatch - Various voices
- Chaotic - Raznus
- Dinosaur King - Dr. Spike Taylor, Ed
- Farhat - Farhat (Season 2 only), additional voices
- Funky Cops - Walker
- G.I. Joe: A Real American Hero - Bullhorn
- G.I. Joe Sigma Six - Heavy Duty, General Hawk
- GoGoRiki - Boboriki, Docoriki, Docoriki’s Evil Clone
- Huntik: Secrets and Seekers - Hoffman
- Jungle Emperor Leo - Coco
- Mobile Suit Gundam Unicorn - Bollard, Additional Voices
- Newbie and the Disasternauts - Zabrowski, Roger
- Ninja Nonsense - Devil, Dad
- Polar Krush - Henderson the Hedgehog, Henry the Hyena
- One Piece - Buggy, Arlong, Rayleigh
- Our Crazy Love - Nicholas
- Pat & Stan - Stan
- Robin Hood: Mischief in Sherwood - the Sheriff
- Shura no Toki - Age of Chaos - Additional Voices
- Skatoony - Albert Pewpert
- Sonic X - Espio the Chameleon, Black Narcissus
- Teenage Mutant Ninja Turtles - Stainless Steel Steve
- The Donkey King - Zandar
- Thumb Wrestling Federation - The Big Time (season 3-5)
- TMNT: Back to the Sewer - Stainless Steel Steve
- Turtles Forever - 80s Splinter, Mirage Shredder
- Tai Chi Chasers - Hak
- Viva Piñata - Fergy Fudgehog
- Yu-Gi-Oh Duel Monsters - Seeker, Nezbitt, Gozaburo Kaiba, Roland, Mr. Ishtar
- Yu-Gi-Oh GX - Tyranno Hasselberry, Chancellor Sheppard, Kagemaru
- Yu-Gi-Oh 5Ds - Chief Armstrong, Tank, Dragan
- Yu-Gi-Oh Zexal - Roscoe, Wolfsbane, Erazor and Don Thousand

=== Live-action dubbing ===
Year	Title	Role	Notes
2008	The Machine Girl	Suguano	English dub

=== Video games ===
Year	Title	Role	Notes
2005–2010	Sonic the Hedgehog series	Espio the Chameleon	Succeeded by Troy Baker
2006	Sonic the Hedgehog	Duke of Soleanna	
