= Erica Schroeder =

American voice actress (born 1975)

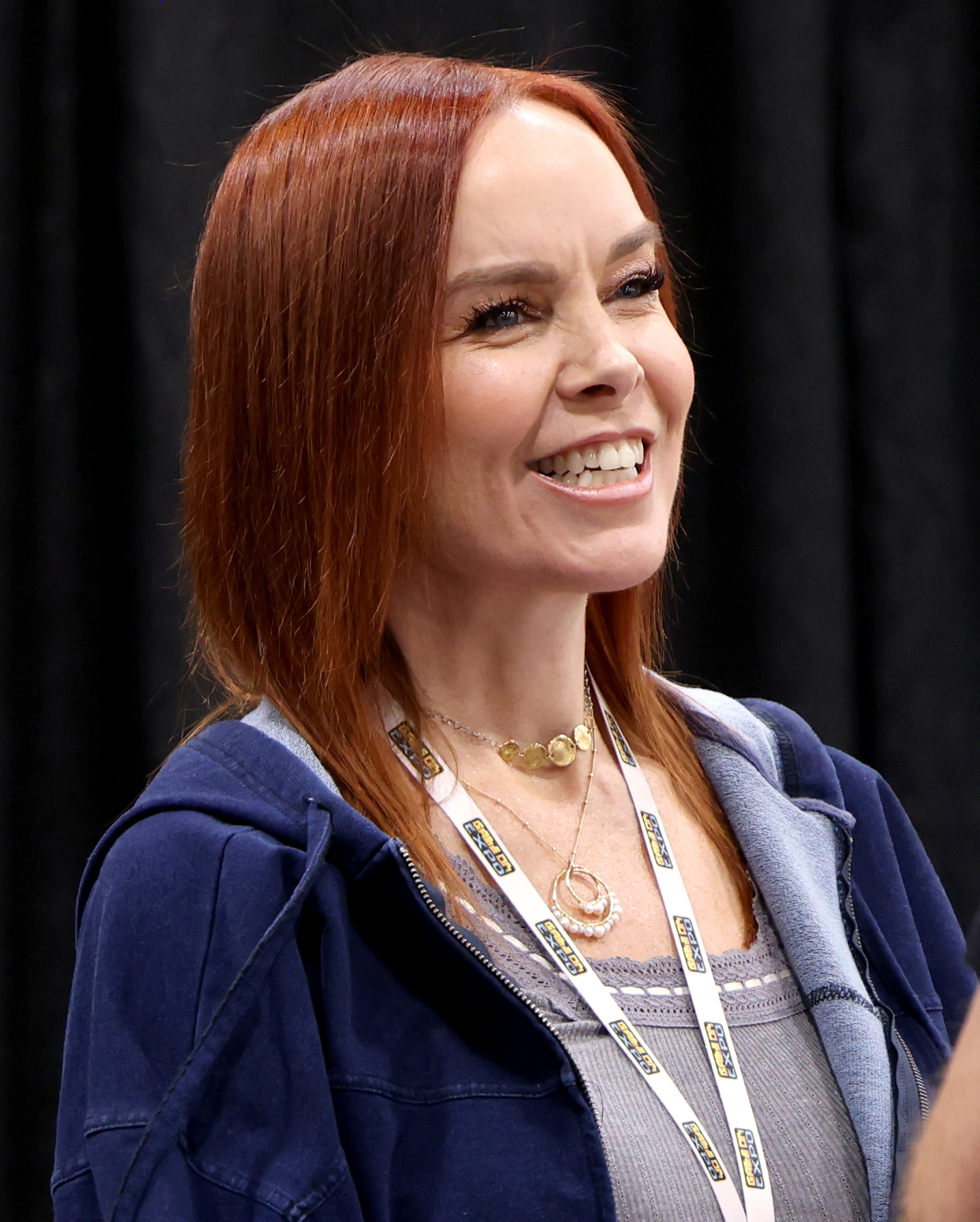
- Schroeder in 2025
- Born: April 27, 1975 (age 51); Albany, New York, U.S.
- Occupation: Voice actress
- Years active: 2002–present
- Spouse: Kenneth Kacmar (m. 2001)
- Children: 2
- Website: https://www.ericaschroeder.com/

Erica Schroeder (born April 27, 1975), sometimes credited as Bella Hudson, is an American voice actress, best known for voicing Lyserg Diethel in both anime adaptations of Shaman King, Devos in World of Warcraft: Shadowlands, Emma Frost in Joss Whedon's Astonishing X-Men, Ilvira in Secret Magic Control Agency, and Cheese and Cat in Boy Girl Dog Cat Mouse Cheese.

Schroeder was the English language original voice of Blaze the Cat in Sonic the Hedgehog from 2005 to 2010. Other roles she is known for are Monkey D. Luffy in One Piece (4Kids dub), Mai Valentine (Season 4), Akiza Izinski and Dark Magician Girl in Yu-Gi-Oh! and its spin-off Yu-Gi-Oh! 5D's, and Nurse Joy (4Kids dub, Seasons 7–8) and Eevee in Pokémon. She has been a major presence in the world of animation and has voiced over 250 roles for video games and animation since 2002. She appeared as Elita in Signe Baumane's animated feature, My Love Affair with Marriage, in 2022, with Cameron Monaghan and Emma Kenney of Shameless, and Matthew Modine of Stranger Things. She was in the original casts and cast albums of Jane Eyre and Shout! The Mod Musical.

== Personal life ==
Schroeder is the mother of voice actress Madigan Kacmar, who appeared in the Golden Globe and Oscar-nominated Mirai, and is married to composer Kenneth Kacmar.

== Filmography ==
=== Anime ===
List of voice performances in anime television series and OVAs
Year	Title	Role	Notes	Source
2002	Ultraman Tiga	Rena Yanase	4Kids Entertainment English dub	
2003–present	Pokémon	Bianca, Nurse Joy, Uxie, Azelf, Mesprit, Fantina, Wobbuffet, Pancham, Sylveon, Tapu Koko, Eevee, Sobble, Drizzile, Lapras, Pawmi, Pawmo, Pawmot, Additional Voices	Nurse Joy (seasons 7–8, 4Kids), Wobbuffet (seasons 20–25)	
2003	Samurai Deeper Kyo	Saiko		
2003	Sadamitsu The Destroyer	Vote Counting Girl		
2003–06	Yu-Gi-Oh!	Mana/Dark Magician Girl, Mai Valentine	Mai Valentine in Season 4 after Megan Hollingshead	
2004	Seven of Seven	Tsukie Kayano, Melody Honey		
2004	Giant Robo	Youshi	OVA, NYAV Post dub	
2004	Domain of Murder	Sayoko Toyama	OVA	
2004	Shura no Toki: Age of Chaos	Iori (Child), Oume		
2004	Shrine of the Morning Mist	Chika Yurikusa		
2004	Gokusen	Sayuri		
2004–07, 2021–present	One Piece	Monkey D. Luffy (4Kids) / Buckingham Stussy, Joy Boy (Funimation)	4Kids Entertainment dub / Funimation dub	
2004–05	Shaman King	Lyserg Dithel, Matti, Kino Asakura, Lee Lee La La		
2005	Gin Rei	Youshi, Rud		
2005	Shadow Star Narutaru	Misono Tamai		
2005	Midori Days	Yuka		
2005	Magical DoReMi	Dorie's Mom, Rona, Ms.Suki, Gia, Additional Voices		
2005	Mew Mew Power	Bridget Verdant/Mew Bridget, Additional Voices	4Kids dub of Tokyo Mew Mew	
2005–08	Yu-Gi-Oh! GX	Fonda Fontaine (Season 1), Camula, Sarina, Tania, Dark Magician Girl	Fonda before Veronica Taylor, Tania after Kathleen Delaney	
2006	Munto 2: Beyond the Walls of Time	Ryueli	OVA	
2006	Pokémon Chronicles	Nurse Joy		
2006	GaoGaiGar: The King of Braves	Swan White		
2006	Outlanders	Momo, Additional Voices	OVA	
2007	Ah! My Goddess: Flights of Fancy	Shiho Sakakibara		
2007	Re: Cutie Honey	Scarlet Claw	OVA	
2007	Phoenix	Obaba, Uzume		
2008–09	Dinosaur King	Sheer, Mrs. Drake, Jim		
2008–11	Yu-Gi-Oh! 5D's	Akiza Izinski, John, Rally Dawson, Ms. Bartlet, Zora		
2008	Joe vs. Joe	Maki Takahura	OVA	
2009	Kurokami: The Animation	Nam		
2009	Tamagotchi!	Ciaotchi, Otokitchi, Building, Sales Bird		
2011–15	Yu-Gi-Oh! Zexal	Cathy Catherine, Mrs. Francis		
2013	Zetman	Akemi Kawakami, Ritsuko		
2016–18	Yu-Gi-Oh! Arc-V	Melissa Trail, Riley Akaba, Ray Akaba		
2021	Suppose a Kid from the Last Dungeon Boonies Moved to a Starter Town	Lloyd Belladonna		
2021	Full Dive	Maria		
2021	Shaman King	Lyserg Dithel		
2021	Mieruko-chan	Arai		
2021	Deep Insanity: The Lost Child	Vera		
2021	My Senpai Is Annoying	Natsumi Kurobe		
2022	Akebi's Sailor Uniform	Yuwa		
2022	Yu-Gi-Oh! Sevens	Proprietress, Additional Voices		
2023	My Happy Marriage	Kanoko Saimori		
2026	Medalist	Nozomi Yuitsuka		
TBA	Emma – A Victorian Romance	Kelly Stownar		

=== Animation ===
List of voice performances in animation
Year	Title	Role	Notes	Source
2004–07	Winx Club	Daphne, Piff, Galatea, Maia, Liss, Yakobetta	4Kids dub (as Bella Hudson)	
2004	Blue's Room	Mandi Ahonen		
2005	G.I. Joe: Sigma 6	Baroness	First voice actor	
2006	Padre Pio	Additional Voices		
2006–08	Kappa Mikey	Additional Voices		
2006–09	Thumb Wrestling Federation	Wasabi, Itsy Bitsy, Pei Pei the Purple Panda, Additional Voices		
2007	Marc Logan	Antonia	(as Bella Hudson)	
2009–12	Huntik: Secrets & Seekers	Amazonian Second in Command, Teien, Cristine, Elder Daughter of Casterwill		
2009	Pat & Stan	Stephanie, Emily		
2009	Astonishing X-Men	Emma Frost	Motion comic	
2011–12	Tai Chi Chasers	Rai, Jahara		
2013–14	The Crumpets	Ms. McBrisk, Ditzy, Bother	Distribimage dub	
2014	Tip the Mouse	Jody		
2015–16	Winx Club	Faragonda, Icy, Piff, Critty, Squonk	DuArt dub	
2016	Regal Academy	Astoria Rapunzel, The Shortbread Witch		
2016	World of Winx	Sophie, Lorelei		
2016	Marcus Level	Marcus		
2018–19	Space Chickens in Space	Niven		
2018–21	44 Cats	Meatball, Piperita		
2019–24	Boy Girl Dog Cat Mouse Cheese	Cheese, Cat		
2019	Winx Club	Faragonda, Icy	3Beep dub	
2022	My Love Affair with Marriage	Elita		
2025–present	Winx Club: The Magic is Back	Griselda		

=== Films ===
List of voice performances in direct-to-video, television films and feature films
Year	Title	Role	Notes	Source
2004	Little Longnose	Witch		
2005	The Boy Who Wanted To Be A Bear	Mother of She-Bear, Spirit of the Mountain, Additional Voices		
2006	Pokémon: Lucario and the Mystery of Mew	Queen Ilene	Credited as Bella Hudson	
2007	Cutie Honey	Scarlet Claw	Live-action dub	
2010	Animals United	Sushi the Polar Bear		
2011	Pokémon—Zoroark: Master of Illusions	Rowena	Credited as Bella Hudson	
2011	Yu-Gi-Oh! Bonds Beyond Time	Akiza Izinski, Dark Magician Girl	Credited as Bella Hudson	
2015	Zarafa	Zarafa		
2016	Psychic School Wars	Yuriko Yamagiwa		
2016	Mai Mai Miracle	Nagako Aoki		
2016	Your Name	Additional Voices		
2018	Pokémon the Movie: The Power of Us	Margo		
2020	Tokyo Godfathers	Gin's daughter Kiyoko, Cat Lady, additional voices		
2021	Secret Magic Control Agency	Ilvira		
2022	The Deer King	Sae		
2024	Ghost Cat Anzu	Yuzuki		

=== Video games ===
List of voice performances in video games
Year	Title	Role	Notes	Source
2004	Shaman King: Power of Spirit	Lyserg Dithel, Matilda		
2004	Yu-Gi-Oh! Destiny Board Traveler	Dark Magician Girl		
2005	Shadow the Hedgehog	Secretary	Credited as Bella Hudson	
2005	Sonic Rush	Blaze the Cat	Credited as Bella Hudson	
2006	Shadow Hearts: From the New World	Hildegard Valentine, Okanagan		
2006	Sonic the Hedgehog	Blaze the Cat	Credited as Bella Hudson	
2006	Sonic Riders	Wave the Swallow	Credited as Bella Hudson	
2007	Sonic and the Secret Rings	Shahra, Blaze the Cat	Credited as Bella Hudson	
2007	Sonic Rush Adventure	Blaze the Cat	Credited as Bella Hudson	
2007	Mario & Sonic at the Olympic Games	Blaze the Cat	Credited as Bella Hudson	
2008	Sonic Riders: Zero Gravity	Wave the Swallow, Blaze the Cat	Credited as Bella Hudson	
2008	Insecticide	Madame Quinbee		
2009	Sonic and the Black Knight	Sir Percival, Blaze the Cat		
2009	Mario & Sonic at the Olympic Winter Games	Blaze the Cat		
2014	Super Smash Bros. for Nintendo 3DS and Wii U	Meloetta		
2015	Just Cause 3	Dimah Ali Umar al-Masri		
2016	Yu-Gi-Oh! Duel Links	Mai Valentine, Akiza Izinski		
2017	White Day: A Labyrinth Named School	Kim Seong-a, Master of the Labyrinth		
2020	World of Warcraft: Shadowlands	Devos		
2021	Pathfinder: Wrath of the Righteous	Nocticula		
2026	Goddess of Victory: Nikke	Princess		

=== Audio ===
List of voice performances in audio format
Year	Title	Role	Notes	Source
2017	The Truth	Betsy	Fiction podcast; Episode: "Do the Voice"	
