= Yu-Gi-Oh! Duel Links =

2016 video game

- Developer: Konami
- Publisher: Konami
- Series: Yu-Gi-Oh!
- Engine: Unity
- Platforms: iOS, iPadOS, Android, Microsoft Windows
- Release: iOS, Android: JP: November 17, 2016; WW: January 11, 2017; Microsoft Windows: WW: November 17, 2017
- Genres: Digital collectible card game Strategy game

Yu-Gi-Oh! Duel Links (遊☆戯☆王 デュエルリンクス) is a free-to-play digital collectible card game developed and published by Konami for the iOS, Android and Microsoft Windows platforms, based on the Yu-Gi-Oh! Trading Card Game. After an initial beta period, the game was first released in Hokkaido, Japan on November 17, 2016, and then released to the rest of the world on January 11, 2017. The Windows version was released worldwide via Steam and in Japan via Yahoo! Japan Games on November 17, 2017.

== Plot ==
Duel Links features characters from the entire Yu-Gi-Oh! anime franchise. Seto Kaiba has created a virtual reality "Duel World" in order to gather the best duelists so they can compete. Players first have the option to play as either Yami Yugi or Seto Kaiba. As they continue to win duels, other characters become unlocked, including the character the player did not choose at the beginning. The player can then unlock other "Duel Worlds" that incorporate other Yu-Gi-Oh! series into the game as they level up and progress throughout the game.

== Gameplay ==
The game uses a format known as "Speed Duels" which uses the rules of the trading card game with various modifications. Players have 4000 Life Points, the Main Phase 2 is removed, the number of Monster Zones and Spell/Trap Zones is reduced from 5 to 3, the Main Deck's size is reduced from 40-60 cards each to 20-30 cards each and the Extra Deck is reduced from 15 to 5 (although this number can be increased to 9 by completing certain missions), and players start with a 4 card hand instead of 5. Players can also use Skills that affect duels in various ways. These effects include but are not limited to adding cards to the hand or field, increasing monster stats, increasing life points, adding cards to the deck at the start of the duel, changing the player's starting hand, and revealing the contents of face-down cards. The winner of a duel either reduces their opponent's life points to 0, allows their opponent to run out of cards, or win under special conditions. Players are rewarded with experience points and various items after a duel, with more items earned from winning.

The game has the player in a hub where they can choose various NPCs to duel against. From here they can also access the Gate which allows them to duel against Legendary Duelists. The current stage the player is on will also be displayed. By completing missions within the stage, players can advance to the next stage which will gradually unlock more difficult opponents and Legendary Duelists at the Gate. Progressing in stages will allow the player to unlock Character Unlock Missions as well.

By completing Character Unlock Missions, players can unlock new Legendary Duelists to play as. Legendary Duelists are based on key characters from the Yu-Gi-Oh series, such as Joey Wheeler, Maximilion Pegasus, Chazz Princeton, and Dr. Vellian Crowler. Each Legendary Duelist comes with their signature card and unique skills.

New cards can be obtained for the player's decks from either Legendary Duelists, the in-game Card Trader using various items or from card packs. Card packs are purchased from the in-game shop using Gems. Card packs can also be purchased with real money via microtransactions. The possible contents of a card pack can vary depending on which BOX the player chooses to buy from. Each card has a probability of being pulled based on their rarity. Common N and R cards tend to have weaker effects, while rarer SR and UR cards have stronger effects. The card pool released at launch includes many cards recognizable from the Yu-Gi-Oh! Duel Monsters anime. As more BOXes were added over time, the card pool expanded to include many cards from more modern Yu-Gi-Oh sets.

At launch, the game's original format did not include cards and mechanics related to Synchro, Xyz, Pendulum, and Link Summoning. Beginning in 2017 with the release of GX World based on Yu-Gi-Oh! GX, every subsequent year has introduced a new Duel World with its associated Summoning mechanic or theme. Yu-Gi-Oh! 5D's was added with Synchro Summoning in 2018 followed by a world themed after Yu-Gi-Oh! The Dark Side of Dimensions in 2019, then a world based on Yu-Gi-Oh! ZEXAL with Xyz Summoning in 2020, then Yu-Gi-Oh! ARC-V with Pendulum Summoning in 2021 and then Yu-Gi-Oh! VRAINS with Link Summoning in 2022 currently rounding up the current Master Duel anime. In 2023, Rush Dueling from Yu-Gi-Oh! SEVENS and its associated world was added into the game and was followed with a world based on Yu-Gi-Oh! GO RUSH!! in 2024.

The game also includes a PvP mode where players can duel in real-time with friends, as well as participate in random matches with players around the world. There is also a ranked ladder where players compete for rank and prizes including tickets which can be used to exchange for certain cards.

Special events often occur for a limited amount of time to provide variety and the opportunity to win rare cards and unlock new Legendary Duelists. These events typically have special opponents with goals and missions that must be completed in order to earn the rewards Cards and characters exclusive to events are usually made available outside of the event at a later date.

== Characters ==
The current roster of playable characters for the game consists of the original series, Yu-Gi-Oh! Duel Monsters, Yu-Gi-Oh! GX, Yu-Gi-Oh! 5D's, Yu-Gi-Oh! The Dark Side of Dimensions, Yu-Gi-Oh! ZEXAL, Yu-Gi-Oh! ARC-V, Yu-Gi-Oh! VRAINS, Yu-Gi-Oh! Sevens, and Yu-Gi-Oh! Go Rush!!. These are the characters that can be currently unlocked by completing their character missions and special events in-game. In 2025, “Alt Style” was added to certain characters.

=== Yu-Gi-Oh! ===
- Yami Yugi
- Seto Kaiba
- Joey Wheeler
- Tea Gardner
- Mai Valentine
- Yugi Muto
- Weevil Underwood
- Rex Raptor
- Mako Tsunami
- Yami Marik
- Yami Bakura
- Bandit Keith
- Ishizu Ishtar
- Odion
- Maximillion Pegasus
- Mokuba Kaiba
- Paradox Brothers
- Arkana
- Bonz
- Espa Roba
- Tristan Taylor
- Lumis and Umbra
- Duke Devlin
- Solomon Muto
- Marik Ishtar
- Rebecca Hawkins
- Serenity Wheeler
- Noah Kaiba
- Alister

=== Yu-Gi-Oh! GX ===
- Jaden Yuki
- Zane Truesdale
- Aster Phoenix
- Chazz Princeton
- Alexis Rhodes
- Jesse Anderson
- Dr. Vellian Crowler
- Bastion Misawa
- Syrus Truesdale
- Yubel
- Tyranno Hassleberry
- Sartorius Kumar
- Jaden/Yubel
- Blair Flannigan
- Axel Brodie
- Supreme King Jaden
- Jim “Crocodile” Cook

=== Yu-Gi-Oh! 5D's ===
- Yusei Fudo
- Jack Atlas
- Crow Hogan
- Akiza Izinski
- Leo
- Luna
- Officer Tetsu Trudge
- Dark Signer Kalin Kessler
- Dark Signer Carly Carmine
- Dark Signer Rex Goodwin
- Carly Carmine
- Kalin Kessler
- Antinomy
- Primo
- Aporia
- Paradox
- Z-one
- Sherry LeBlanc

=== Yu-Gi-Oh! The Dark Side of Dimensions ===
- Seto Kaiba (DSOD)
- Mokuba Kaiba (DSOD)
- Sera (DSOD)
- Aigami (DSOD)
- Scud (DSOD)
- Joey Wheeler (DSOD)
- Yugi Muto (DSOD)
- Téa Gardner (DSOD)
- Bakura (DSOD)

=== Yu-Gi-Oh! ZEXAL ===
- Yuma Tsukumo and Astral
- Bronk Stone
- Tori Meadows
- Reginald "Shark" Kastle
- Kite Tenjo
- Quattro
- Trey
- Anna Kaboom
- Rio Kastle
- Girag
- Quinton
- Alito
- Mizar
- Dumon
- Vector
- Marin
- Nash

=== Yu-Gi-Oh! Arc-V ===
- Yuya Sakaki
- Yuri
- Yugo
- Yuto
- Zuzu Boyle
- Lulu Obsidian
- Rin
- Celina
- Gong Strong
- Sylvio Sawatari
- Declan Akaba
- Sora Perse
- Shay Obsidian
- Dennis McField

=== Yu-Gi-Oh! VRAINS ===
- Playmaker and Ai
- Soulburner/Soulburner and Flame
- The Gore
- Blue Angel
- Varis
- Ghost Gal
- Spectre
- Akira Zaizen

=== Yu-Gi-Oh! Sevens ===
- Yuga Ohdo
- Lucidien “Luke” Kallister
- Gavin Sogetsu
- Romin Kassidy
- Mimi Imimi
- Roa Kassidy
- Nail Saionji
- Asana Matsuba
- Yuo Goha
- Yuka Goha
- Tiadosia “Tiger” Kallister
- Yuro Goha
- Saburamen

=== Yu-Gi-Oh! Go Rush!! ===
- Yudias Velgear
- Yuhi Ohdo
- Yuamu Ohdo
- Zuwijo Zwil Velgear
- Maddox Sogetsu
- Immi Imimi
- Asaka Mutsuba

== Reception ==
Reception

Aggregate score
Aggregator	Score
Metacritic	iOS: 80/100

Review score
Publication	Score
Pocket Gamer	9/10

Several publications praised Yu-Gi-Oh! Duel Links for simplifying many of the rules of the traditional card game and making it very accessible to new players. AppCritic noted that it would also appeal to veteran players saying, "While this is not a full TCG experience, there's still a good amount of depth and strategy involved for veteran Yu-Gi-Oh! players." Pocket Gamer praised the presentation of the game saying that "it's all presented in a way that is arguably better than the original anime, and there's even full voice acting delivered by the original voice actors. This not only creates an authentic feel that's second to none, but most importantly, it all adds to the nostalgia and immersion. Ultimately making the player feel like they have literally stepped into the world of Yu-Gi-Oh!."

The game exceeded 65 million mobile downloads worldwide by March 2018, and exceeded 80 million downloads across PC and mobile devices by 1 November 2018. The game has reached 100 million mobile downloads worldwide, as of October 2019. In addition, Steam Spy estimates the game to have more than 2 million players on Steam.

The game grossed $23.9 million in 2016. In Japan, the game grossed ¥9.44 billion in 2018 and ¥7.13 billion in 2019, for a combined ¥16.57 billion ($104.66 million) in Japan during 2018–2019. In the first half of 2021, it grossed $110 million, making it the top-grossing card battler mobile game during the period. In total, the game's known revenue during 2016, 2018–2019 and the first half of 2021 adds up to $284 million.

In November 2020, Duel Links celebrated the milestone of reaching 5 billion duels.

In March 2022, Duel Links celebrated reaching 150 million downloads worldwide with more than 75 billion cards collected and 7 billion duels done by duelists across the world.

== Languages ==
The game supports established languages in English, French, Italian, German, Spanish (Spain), Portuguese (Brazil), Chinese (Simplified and Traditional), Korean and Japanese. The dubbing voice supports English, Korean and Japanese. Typical for the main card game, but also for the first in an official Yu-Gi-Oh! product, the Russian language later also became available in 2020.
