= Jack Atlas =

American military personnel (born 1917)

- Born: June 3, 1917
- Died: February 26, 1999 (aged 81)
- Education: Tufts University
- Occupation: Publicist

Jack Atlas (June 3, 1917 – February 26, 1999) was an American publicist who became an important figure in the development of movie trailers.

After graduating from Tufts University in 1939, Atlas moved to Los Angeles and began working for the Metro-Goldwyn-Mayer Publicity Department as a "downtown planter" in 1942. Atlas left his position there to serve in the U.S. Navy during World War II from 1943 to 1946. He returned to the studio in 1946 and worked there in various capacities until 1960. In 1951 Atlas wrote and produced behind-the-scenes segments for The Ed Sullivan Show. In 1955 Atlas was appointed associate producer of MGM's first television program, MGM Parade, which ran for 34 weeks with actor George Murphy as host. When the show was canceled, Atlas returned to MGM's trailer department for special assignments. Here he wrote MGM's first featurettes for television for the films Raintree County and The Teahouse of the August Moon.

In 1960 Atlas left MGM to work as vice president of promotion at Columbia Pictures. In 1973 he left Columbia to launch, with his wife Myrtle, the Jack Atlas Organization, the first company to offer all production of marketing materials under one roof. The company flourished. Atlas retired in 1983.

Among the notable movie trailers Atlas produced are Ben-Hur, South Pacific and Funny Girl.

Atlas served as a member of the board of governors of the Academy of Motion Picture Arts and Sciences (P.R. branch) from 1963 to 1971 and was chairman of the Academy Ball for three years.
