= List of Yu-Gi-Oh! Go Rush!! characters =

The following is a list of characters from the Yu-Gi-Oh! anime series, Yu-Gi-Oh! Go Rush!!.

== Characters ==
=== Main characters ===
Yudias Velgear
Voiced by: Arthur Lounsbery (Japanese); John Patneaude (English)
The main protagonist of the series and an alien from Velgear VIII of the Velgear Star Cluster. He was forced to flee his home and learn about Rush Dueling, which he believes can lead his friends and comrades to a new future. In the second season, after ending the war within his homeworld, he returns to Earth and faces off against the new leaders of MIK; Phaser Ryugu and Tremolo Ryugu, and later on, Kuaidal Velgear, the first Velgearian created by The Creator. In the third season, he faces off against the Dark Matter Empire led by his ally Yuamu Ohdo, then Yuhi Ohdo after he became "Otes" due to Yuamu's actions before facing off against Otes in the Sengoku era. After defeating Otes, Yudias stays in the past with the remaining Velgearians to ensure that the Ohdo twins' future came to pass; he even adopted the Ohdo name for himself, implying that he is the first member of the Ohdo family bloodline that would later include Yuhi, Yuamu and Yuga.
After defeating Kuaidal, the latter vanishes but later revives within Yudias' body, becoming his partner and giving him the ability to Ritual Summon.
Yuhi Ohdo (王(おう)道(どう) 遊(ゆう)飛(ひ), Ōdō Yūhi)
Voiced by: Toshiki Kumagai (Japanese); Paul Castro Jr. (English)
Yuamu's older twin brother who works for UTS under Yuamu. He believes a mysterious substance, Earthdamar, was stolen from him by aliens, and has been searching for the aliens ever since to retrieve it. Both he and Yuamu are Yuga Ohdo's ancestors.
In the third season, Yuhi uses the "Monster Reborn" card and Dark Power to erase his memories and become "Otes" to ensure that Yuga Ohdo's future comes to pass. He then attempts to use Yuna Goha's Time Machine to enter Yuga's era. However, he is ultimately defeated by Yudias and he loses his Dark Power after ending up in the Sengoku era due to Yuna's Time Machine, returning to his former self. He later helps Yudias in his final battle against Otes before returning to his timeline.
Yuamu Ohdo (王(おう)道(どう) 遊歩(ゆあむ), Ōdō Yuamu) / Dark Meister (ダークマイスター, Dāku Maisutā)
Voiced by: Koko Fukushima (Japanese); Michelle Jin (English)
Yuhi's younger twin sister and the president of UTS. Both she and Yuhi are Yuga Ohdo's ancestors. In the finale of the second season, Yuamu experiences the memories of her descendant Yuga Ohdo and resolves to become "Otes" to ensure that Yuga's future takes place. However, she is defeated by Yudias after she took over for Yuga in the final Duel, before then sending Yuga back to his timeline.
In the third season, she goes missing after disappearing in a dark storm and she later appears in the Dark Matter Space surrounded by the deceased Velgearians. Yuamu uses the Dark Power of the Dark Matter Space to become the Dark Meister, creating the Dark Matter Empire and eventually becoming the main antagonist of the third season. She planned to obtain "Monster Reborn" to erase her memories and become Otes. However, she ultimately fails in her efforts when Yuhi becomes Otes instead. After Yudias defeated Yuhi-Otes, Yuna's Time Machine activated and she was sent to the Sengoku era, she seemingly lost her Dark Power. After helping Yudias to defeat Otes, she returned with Yuhi back to their timeline.
Maddox Sogetsu / Manabu Sogetsu (蒼(そう)月(げつ)マナブ, Sōgetsu Manabu)
Voiced by: Natsuki Hanae (Japanese); Barrett Leddy (English)
He is in charge of MIK's Mutsuba Town branch, dedicated to cracking down on aliens who come to Earth without proper authorization, and is partnered with Nyandestar, who he makes daily rounds with. After Phaser Ryugu takes over MIK in the second season, Maddox joins forces with Yudias, Yuamu and Yuhi. He is confirmed to be Gavin Sogetsu's ancestor.
Zuwijo Zwil Velgear (ズウィージョウ・ズィル・ベルギャー, Zuwījou Ziru Berugyā)
Voiced by: Takuya Eguchi (Japanese); Blythe Melin (English)
An alien from the Velgear Star Cluster. He was Yudias' superior officer and disappeared in battle but reappears on Earth with an interest in Rush Duels and in Yuhi's Earthdamar.
In the second season, Zuwijo later vanished from existence due to the Velgearians reaching the end of their lifespan, although he was revived within the Dark Matter Space during the third season before joining the Dark Matter Empire. He later rejoined Yudias and his allies after Yuhi became Otes. In the finale, he remains in the past with his fellow Velgearians including Yudias to help ensure the Ohdo twins' future comes to pass.

=== UTS ===
The Ultraterrestrial Tracker Squad / Ultraterrestrial Trouble Solutions (宇(う)宙(ちゅう)人(じん)トラブル相(そう)談(だん)者(しゃ), Uchūjin Toraburu Sōdansha; lit. 'Alien Trouble Consultancy'), or UTS for short, is a corporate entity run by Yuamu and Yuhi that specializes in getting rid of troublesome aliens. Most of the characters working for UTS resemble many of the side characters from Yu-Gi-Oh! SEVENS and it is implied that they may be their ancestors.

Galixon Townsend / Galixon Tazaki (田(た)崎(ざき)ギャリクソン, Tazaki Gyarikuson)
Voiced by: Mitsuki Nakamura (Japanese); Michael Silberblatt (English)
A veteran member of UTS and is the primary caretaker of Yuhi and Yuamu.
Danko Entant / Dabingo Arisugawa (有(あり)栖(す)川(がわ)ダビンゴ, Arisugawa Dabingo)
Voiced by: Yusuke Saeki (Japanese); Nicholas Corda (English)
A veteran member of UTS and was formerly employed as an animation director.
Tyson Getz / Gale Taira (平(たいら)ゲイル, Taira Geiru)
Voiced by: Rei Miura (Japanese); Barrett Leddy (English)
A veteran member of UTS.
Gwyneth Purdy / Gurumi Purisaki (プリ崎(さき)グル美(み), Purisaki Gurumi)
Voiced by: Rie Kawamura (Japanese); Grace Choi (English)
A veteran member of UTS, serving as the seamstress of the company.
Makiko Maki (巻(まき) 巻(まき)子(こ), Maki Makiko)
Voiced by: Mari Uchiyama (Japanese); Diana Huey (English)
A veteran member of UTS.
Manipillio Elephantus / Manupilio Zomyoji (象(ぞう)明(みょう)寺(じ)マニュピリオ, Zōmyōji Manyupirio)
Voiced by: Chado Horii (Japanese); Danny Kramer (English)
A veteran member of UTS.
Mo Toombs / Mondai Omaneo (御(お)前(まえ)乃(の)モンダイ, Omaeno Mondai)
Voiced by: Ryo Takizawa (Japanese); Kevin K. Gomez (English)
A veteran member of UTS, specializing in urban rumors.
Bob Briscoe / Torey Yagi
Voiced by: Tomohiro Shiozaki (Japanese); Bryson Baugus (English)
A veteran member of UTS and the caterer of the company.

=== The Secrecy ===
The Secrecy / Organization for Monitoring Interstellar Kriminals (迷(めい)惑(わく)異(い)星(せい)人(じん)監(かん)視(し)機(き)構(こう), Meiwaku Iseijin Kanshikikō; lit. 'Organization for Monitoring Troublesome Aliens'), or MIK for short, is a corporate entity that cracks down on aliens that have come to Earth without proper authorization. They are also responsible for monitoring aliens that live on Earth in designated areas.

Phaser Ryugu (竜(りゅう)宮(ぐう)フェイザー, Ryūgū Feizā)
Voiced by: Kosuke Tanabe
The commander of MIK, spearheading a crackdown on aliens and their associates in Mutsuba Town.
Tremolo Ryugu (竜(りゅう)宮(ぐう)トレモロ, Ryūgū Toremoro)
Voiced by: Yū Hayashi
A Special Enforcement Officer of MIK, working directly under his older brother Phaser.
Ranran Nanahoshi (七(なな)星(ほし)ランラン, Nanahoshi Ranran)
Voiced by: Yuna Kamakura (Japanese); Grace Choi (English)
Serving as the head of the MIK headquarters, Ranran surveys the Alien Residential Area.
Meowdestar / Nyandestar (ニャンデスター, Nyandesutā)
Voiced by: Fairouz Ai (Japanese); Kendell Byrd (English)
An alien from Pawtner, Nyandestar inadvertently ends up in Mutsuba Town after her planet is attacked by The☆Lugh, where she and London devise a plan that leads her to join MIK and become Manabu's partner.
Energy Copyko
Voiced by: Enako
A prison guard for MIK who was promoted due to her mimicry abilities.
Henry Honya
Voiced by: Takuto Yoshinaga
He resembles Booster Page and works for MIK, claiming to be Number One in the Astral Observation Division.
Jane Honya
Voiced by: Takako Tanaka
Henry's younger sister.
Peter Honya
Voiced by: Taichi Kusano
Henry's younger brother.
Nostra / Nomura (野村, Nomura)
Voiced by: Aoi Ichikawa
A humanoid alien who, along with his partner, Damas, takes on the identity of a prophet known to the public as Nomurandamas (ノムラトダマス, Nomuratodamasu).

=== Rovian Bandits ===
The Rovian Bandits is an organization of ruffians who strike terror into the aliens in the underground sector of the Alien Residential Area.

Rovian Kassidy / Rovian Kirishima (霧島ロヴィアン, Kirishima Rovian)
Voiced by: Tomori Kusunoki (Japanese); Abby Espiritu (English)
The queen of the Badloon Castle and the leader of the "Rovian Bandits". She later becomes an ally of Yudias, Yuamu and Yuhi during the second season. She seems to be Romin Kassidy's ancestor.
London Kassidy / London Kirishima (霧(きり)島(しま)ロンドン, Kirishima Rondon)
Voiced by: Kazuki Furuta (Japanese); James Brown Jr. (English)
Initially introduced as Manya's manager, London is later revealed to be a member of the Rovian Bandits. He seems to be Roa Kassidy's ancestor.
Yuna Goha (ゴーハ・ユウナ, Gōha Yuuna)
Voiced by: Kanon Takao (Japanese); Hayden Daviau (English)
The current president of Goha Company, who was reported missing in the Alien Residential Area by London, who hires UTS to find her. Alongside Asaka Mutsuba and Yuga Ohdo, Yuna helped to recreate Rush Dueling in the series.
In the second season, it is revealed that Yuna has romantic feelings for Yuga. When Kuaidal Velgear created the Kuaidal Spacetime, Yuna imagined a married life with Yuga but was left deeply affected when it was revealed to be fake. This ultimately drives her into a dangerous obsession with Yuga as she desires to enter the future and be with him regardless of the consequences. To this end, in the third season she forms a brief alliance with Yuamu and the Dark Matter Empire to transform Goha Company into Goha Corporation and later to create a Time Machine with the help of Yuhi when he becomes Otes. However, she betrays her former friends to use the machine for her own desires to be with Yuga. After entering the machine, her fate remains unknown.
Jaburamen / Menjaburo Omori (大(おお)森(もり) 麺(めん)ジャブ郎(ろう), Ōmori Menjaburō)
Voiced by: Daisuke Nagumo (Japanese); Mark Lee (English)
A self-proclaimed student of noodle dipping, Menjaburo was reported to have gone missing after his encounter with Yuna, only to be revealed that he is directly under her employment.
Tab Pitman / Netsuzo Shinjitsu (真(しん)実(じつ)ネツゾー, Shinjitsu Netsuzō)
Voiced by: Tomoya Yamamoto (Japanese); Matthew Hooper (English)
A freelance journalist who covers exclusive news of Mutsuba Town, Netsuzo is approached by Yuna to join the Rovian Bandits in their pursuit for the underground Space Treasure.

=== Arctic Nebula ===
The Luug / The☆Luug (ザ☆ルーグ, Za☆Rūgu)
Voiced by: Taku Yashiro (Japanese); Matthew Gumley (English)
Also commonly known as The Great King of Terror (恐きょう怖ふの大だい王おう, Kyōfu no Daiō). A ruler from the Arctic Nebula, his ship emerges beyond the Solar System and approaches the Earth. He is a minor antagonist of the first season, but later becomes an ally in the second season. He is implied to be Lucidien "Luke" Kallister's ancestor.
The Curiosity / Zaion / The☆Providence (ザ☆セツリ, Za☆Setsuri)
Voiced by: Yoshitsugu Matsuoka (Japanese); Y. Chang (English)
He serves The☆Lugh, acting as his chief of staff. He is seemingly Nail Saionji's ancestor.
The Hobbysaurus / The☆Mokeida Mbembe (ザ☆模(も)型(けい)田(だ)ムベンベ, Za☆Mokeida Mubenbe)
Voiced by: Ryota Iwasaki (Japanese); Greg Abbey (English)
One of the servants of The☆Lugh, participating in the Friendship Rush Duel Tournament.

=== Aliens ===
The Creator
Voiced by: Daisuke Namikawa
He is responsible for the creation of the Velgearians and their endless war. It is later revealed that he is Otes's Earthdama that was separated from Otes after his battle against Yuga Ohdo in the end of Yu-Gi-Oh! SEVENS. After The Creator created Kuaidal Velgear, the first Velgearian, the latter absorbed The Creator into his heart to prevent him from leaving. As Kuaidal has since fused with Yudias, The Creator's fate remains unknown.
Kuaidal Velgear (クァイドゥール・ベルギャー, Kwaidūru Berugyā)
Voiced by: Subaru Kimura
The first Velgearian created by The Creator and thus the artificial blueprint for the entire Velgearian race. He was one of the main antagonists of the second season. He wishes to enjoy Rush Dueling before the end of his lifespan. As a result, he used various methods to achieve this goal by creating the distortive "Kuaidal Spacetime" and using "Darkness" cards to manipulate other characters. He is ultimately defeated by Yudias and fades from existence.
In the third season, Kuaidal revives within Yudias and becomes his partner, showing the ability to switch places with him. However, Yuna Goha eventually separates Yudias and Kuaidal in order to gain the latter's knowledge of time travel for her time machine. Whilst within Yudias' body, Kuaidal also discovered the power of Ritual Summoning and passed this technique down to Yudias.
Dinowa Velgear (ディノワ・ベルギャー, Dinowa Berugyā)
Voiced by: Yūko Natsuyoshi (Japanese); Lauren Choo (English)
A Velgearian from the Velgear Star Cluster and one of Zuwijo's servants, being his self-proclaimed right-hand woman.
Nisho Dukas / Dudi Nisho (デュッディ・ニーショウ, Dyuddi Nīshou)
Voiced by: Tarusuke Shingaki (Japanese); Andrew Paull (English)
Commander of the Dukas Armada in the Dukas Star System.
Teru Kawai (合(か)羽(わ)井(い)テル, Kawai Teru)
Voiced by: Kengo Kawanishi (Japanese); Mike Liscio (English)
An alien who comes to Mutsuba Town, and has a connection to Yuhi, having been the alien who stole his Earthdamar.
Chupataro Kaburagi (鏑(かぶら)木(ぎ) チュパ太(た)郎(ろう), Kaburagi Chupatarō)
Voiced by: Shin Yuki (Japanese); Seth Fuentes (English)
An alien who comes to Mutsuba Town, and is described as having a "strong obsession".
Graves / Bochi (ボチ, Bochi)
Voiced by: Takuma Nagatsuka (Japanese); Hunter C. Smith (English)
An alien currently in Manya's care, who initially came to Mutsuba Town to eliminate the Sogetsu Clan, until he had a change of heart after coming in contact with Manabu.
Terza Flatwood / Mitsuko Hiramori (平(ひら)森(もり)みつ子, Hiramori Mitsuko)
Voiced by: Yū Kobayashi (Japanese); Alice Himora (English)
An alien who works for Zuwijo.
George Jersey (ジョウジ・ジャージ, Jōji Jāji)
Voiced by: Takaya Kuroda (Japanese); Eric Stuart (English)
An alien from the Jersey Devil Planet, currently residing in the Alien Residential Area of Mutsuba Town alongside his younger brothers.
Jerry Jersey / Jouge Jersey (ジョウゲ・ジャージ, Jōge Jāji)
Voiced by: Yusuke Tonozaki (Japanese); Dan Green (English)
An alien from the Jersey Devil Planet, currently residing in the Alien Residential Area of Mutsuba Town alongside his brothers George and Ofuruno.
Otto Jersey / Ofuruno Jersey (オフルノ・ジャージ, Ofuruno Jāji)
Voiced by: Kyohei Natsume (Japanese); Ted Lewis (English)
An alien from the Jersey Devil Planet, currently residing in the Alien Residential Area of Mutsuba Town alongside his George and Jouge.
Fisher Sky (フィッシャー・須海, Fisshā Sukai)
Voiced by: Kenji Nojima (Japanese); Henry Mason (English)
A Skyfish alien made up from multiple consciousnesses who reside in the Alien Residential Area of Mutsuba Town, and operate under the identity of the Informant.
Myuda Velgear (ミューダ・ベルギャー, Myūda Berugyā)
Voiced by: Tatsuyuki Kobayashi (Japanese); Jacob Tarconish (English)
A Velgearian from the Velgear Star Cluster and one of Zuwijo zir Velgear's servants, tasked with infiltrating MIK and stealing the Earthdamar.
Deceptus / Damas (ダマス)
A Chapeau Alien, a type of parasitic alien that lives on the heads of humanoid aliens, who when with his partner Nomura takes on the identity of a prophet called Nomurandamas (ノムラトダマス, Nomuratodamasu).
Shubaha (シューバッハ, Shūbahha)
Voiced by: Shūichirō Umeda (Japanese); Kevin Andrew Rivera (English)
He owns a delivery service that is known throughout space for its speed and is from a family of Dragon Busters (ドラゴンバスター, Doragonbasutā)) that can transform into swords and hunt space dragons.

=== Mutsuba Town ===
Asaka Mutsuba (六(むつ)葉(ば)アサカ, Mutsuba Asaka)
Voiced by: Minami Takahashi (Japanese); Jennifer Silverman (English)
The president of the Mutsuba Heavy Machinery and the de-facto leader of Mutsuba Town. Asaka, along with Yuga Ohdo and Yuna Goha, was responsible for the creation and distribution of Rush Duels. In the third season, Asaka constructs a mask based on Otes' mask as part of her plan to become Otes to ensure that Yuga's future happens, but her plan is foiled by Yuhi when he becomes Otes.
Damamu (ダマムー, Damamū)
Voiced by: Hina Kino
Yuhi's Earthdama, having eventually gained free will after being extracted from his body and manifesting a physical body for themselves, and they are sought by Zuwijo as part of his plan to win the war in the Velgear Star Cluster.
Grotto Ishida / Ishida Glatt (グラット石(いし)田(だ), Guratto Ishida)
Voiced by: Shota Hayama
A citizen of Mutsuba Town with a fascination towards rock balancing who tends to be confused for an alien.
Mike / Makeru Kurimoto (栗(くり)本(もと)マケル, Kurimoto Makeru)
Voiced by: Kentarō Kumagai (Japanese); Billy Bob Thompson (English)
The host of Mutsuba Cable TV.
Miranda Ichimaru
Voiced by: Saki Yasui (Japanese); Lisa Clair (English)
The only camera operator of Mutsuba Cable TV.
Immi Imimi / Manya Atachi (安(あ)立(たち)マニャ, Atachi Manya)
Voiced by: Rio Suzuki (Japanese); Anjali Kunapaneni (English)
Yuamu's childhood friend who moved away from Mutsuba Town to become an actress.

=== Returning characters ===
Yuga Ohdo (王道 遊我, Ōdō Yūga)
Voiced by: Hiiro Ishibashi (Japanese); Bryson Baugus (English)
The main protagonist of Yu-Gi-Oh! SEVENS and the creator of Rush Duels, who ended up in the past after his duel against Otes and was forced to recreate it after being found by Zuwijo. He is responsible for giving Yudias his Duel Disk and cards. Referred as "That Guy" (アイツ, Aitsu), Yuga works at the Goha Company for Yuna.
In the second season, Yuga eventually gives up hope of returning to his timeline in the future and instead resolves to take on the identity of Otes. To this end, he attempted to prevent the recreation of the "Monster Reborn" card after Yudias and his allies believed that it could revive the Velgearians following their disappearance. He is then opposed by Yuhi and Yudias, but is injured during their Duel and is replaced by Yuamu, who ultimately loses the Duel in his place. Yuga is ultimately sent back to his timeline by Yudias, Yuhi and Yuamu, reuniting with Lucidien "Luke" Kallister, Romin Kassidy and Gavin Sogetsu as shown in the series finale.
Otes (オーティス, Ōtisu) / Usu Otei (翁丁臼おていうす, Oteiusu)
Voiced by: Daisuke Namikawa
The main antagonist of Yu-Gi-Oh! SEVENS, who Yuga defeated before they were sent back in the past. His Earthdama was separated from him and went on to become The Creator.
Otes' identity becomes a significant plot point in the third season, as Yuamu and Asaka create their own plans to become Otes to ensure that Yuga's timeline comes to pass. Yuhi is the one that ultimately succeeds in briefly becoming "Otes" much to everyone's horror, but after his loss to Yudias, Yuhi is returned to normal. It is later revealed that Otes was transported to the Sengoku era following his Duel with Yuga; he recreated Rush Duels in that era and adopted the name of Usu Otei, becoming a ruthless lord. He then attempted to return to the future but was defeated by Yudias. Afterwards, he was exiled to a faraway planet with Kuaidal to be watched for eternity.
