= List of Yu-Gi-Oh! Sevens characters =

The following is a list of characters from the Yu-Gi-Oh! anime series, Yu-Gi-Oh! Sevens.

== Characters ==
=== Main characters ===
Yuga Ohdo (王道 遊我, Ōdō Yūga)
Voiced by: Hiiro Ishibashi (Japanese); Bryson Baugus (English)
An enthusiastic fifth grader who tinkers with machines and makes up new rules, which applies to the making of Rush Duels. He became the true King of Duels after defeating Luke and Otes. After defeating Otes, he and Yuga disappear into the past alongside Kaizo for two years before returning; Yuga also appears in Yu-Gi-Oh! GO RUSH!! and ends up recreating Rush Duels in the past while missing in space, though his actions did not lead to any major changes in his timeline.
Lucidien "Luke" Kallister / Tatsuhisa "Luke" Kamijō (上城龍久 / ルーク, Kamijō Tatsuhisa / Rūku)
Voiced by: Taku Yashiro (Japanese); Matthew Gumley (English)
An aspiring lad, who aims to become the "King of Duels" by partaking in Yuga's Rush Duels. He has an alleged "power" that triggers a Pauli effect, causing machinery to temporarily shut down. However, it was later revealed that it was a watch his grandfather gave him that has this ability.
Gavin Sogetsu / Gakuto Sōgetsu (蒼月学人, Sōgetsu Gakuto)
Voiced by: Natsuki Hanae (Japanese); Barrett Leddy (English)
An adamant, disciplined member of Goha 7th Elementary's student council.
Romin Kassidy / Romin Kirishima (霧島ロミン, Kirishima Romin)
Voiced by: Tomori Kusunoki (Japanese); Abby Espiritu (English)
A guitarist of the band "RoaRomin", who takes an interest in duelling after receiving a card from a musician she admires.
Roa Kassidy / Roa Kirishima (霧島ロア, Kirishima Roa)
Voiced by: Kazuki Furuta (Japanese); James Brown Jr. (English)
Romin's cousin and leader of the band "RoaRomin". He became Yuga's rival early on in the series after spying on him to learn about Rush Duels, but later became his friend.
Nail Saionji / Neiru Saionji (西(さい)園(おん)寺(じ)ネイル, Saionji Neiru)
Voiced by: Yoshitsugu Matsuoka (Japanese); Y. Chang (English)
The overseer of Goha Duels, who steals Kaizo's data to aid in his efforts to erase Rush Dueling. He is also the first known person to Maximum Summon.
Asana Mutsuba (六(むつ)葉(ば)アサナ, Mutsuba Asana)
Voiced by: Minami Takahashi (Japanese); Jennifer Silverman (English)
The heir to the Mutsuba Heavy Machinery company, which helped construct Goha City, and the leader of the Heavy Cavalry Duel Club, who has power over the entire school.

=== Goha 7th Elementary ===
Rayne Nanahoshi / Ranze Nanahoshi (蘭(らん)世(ぜ), Nanahoshi Ranze)
Voiced by: Yuna Kamakura (Japanese); Grace Choi (English)
Rino's twin sister and vice president of the student council, who assists Gavin with the student council's duties and enforces discipline at Goha 7th. She is in love with Yuga. She once worked for Nail before quitting, then, between the Rush Duel tournament arc, returned and left again.
Rino Nanahoshi / Rinnosuke Nanahoshi (凛(りん)之(の)介(すけ), Nanahoshi Rinnosuke)
Voiced by: Chiaki Kobayashi (Japanese); Evan Maltby (English)
Rayne's twin brother and secretary of the student council, who assists Gavin with the student council's duties and enforces discipline at Goha 7th. He is devoted to Gavin.
Ricky / Riku Endo (遠藤リク, Endō Riku)
Voiced by: Rikuya Yasuda (Japanese); Kevin Cutliffe (English)
One of Yuga's friends.
Katsu Kobayakawa (小早川カツ, Kobayakawa Katsu)
Voiced by: Shunpei Ooba
One of Yuga's friends.
Scoop Pitman / Bakuro Shinjitsu (真実バクロー, Shinjitsu Bakurō)
Voiced by: Tomoya Yamamoto
The Newspaper Club's head. He criticized Rush Duels in the Yuga 7 newspapers until he dueled and saw how fun Rush Duels were.
Masa / Masaru (マサル, Masaru)
Voiced by: Kentarō Kumagai
The Newspaper Club's interviewer.
Nico (ニコ, Niko)
Voiced by: Saki Yasui
The Newspaper Club's photographer.
Yosh Imimi / Yoshio Atachi (安(あ)立(たち)ヨシオ, Atachi Yoshio)
Voiced by: Takuma Nagatsuka (Japanese); Marc Thompson / Henry Mason (English)
Mimi's son. He loves Rush Duels, which brings him into conflict with his mother.
Tiadosia "Tiger" Kallister / Haruka "Tiger" Kamijo (上(かみ)城(じょう) 大(はる)華(か) / タイガー, Kamijō Haruka / Taigā)
Voiced by: Saeko Kamijo (Japanese); Cat Protano (English)
Lucidien's older sister and the president of the Concert Band Club. She is Asana's childhood friend. However, they went their separate ways because of a feud involving Luke when they were kids, which caused her to think that Asana had abandoned her while searching for the missing Luke.

=== Goha 3rd Elementary ===
Saburamen / Menzaburo Oomori (大(おお)森(もり)麺(めん)三(ざぶ)郎(ろう), Ōmori Menzaburō)
Voiced by: Daisuke Nagumo (Japanese); Caleb Yen (English)
A fifth grader from Goha 3rd Elementary who loves ramen and dreams of one day creating new rules that fuse ramen and Dueling together. He achieves this goal during the Goha siblings arc in season 2, when Yuga made the app that makes up several dueling systems.
Buff Grimes / Arata Arai (洗(あら)井(い) 新(あら)太(た), Arai Arata)
Voiced by: Ryōta Ōsaka
The leader of the Washing Club. He works for Nail Saionji and is the weakest member of the Garden of Curiosity. He cheats in duels.

=== Goha 2nd Elementary ===
Professor Diggs / Kan Hakubutsu (はくぶつ かん, Hakubutsu Kan)
Voiced by: Yuki Sakakihara
A sixth grader at Goha 2nd Elementary and president of the Dueling & Dinosaur Research Club. In season 1, his club and Yuga's friends were looking for a dueling kaiju. However, when he wanted to get it for himself, he learned his lesson after realizing that it was selfish and not something his grandfather would do.
Tracker / Hunt Goto (後(ご)藤(とう)ハント, Gotō Hanto)
Voiced by: Risae Matsuda
A student at Goha 2nd Elementary and a member of the Dueling & Dinosaur Research Club. He is called Tracker because he can sense artifacts and other things by sneezing.
Trench / Kaseki Hotta (堀(ほっ)田(た)カセキ, Hotta Kaseki)
Voiced by: Ryōta Suzuki
A student at Goha 2nd Elementary, and vice-chairman of the Dueling & Dinosaur Research Club.

=== Goha Aquatic Elementary ===
Skipjack / Nanami Maguro (間(ま)黒(ぐろ) 七(なな)海(み), Maguro Nanami)
Voiced by: Makoto Furukawa
The captain of the Goha Aquatic Elementary ship and a Fisherman Duelist.

=== Goha 6th Elementary ===
Galian Townsend / Galient Tazaki (田(た)崎(ざき)ギャリアン, Tazaki Gyarian)
Voiced by: Mitsuki Nakamura (Japanese); Michael Silberblatt (English)
The tactical advisor of the Heavy Cavalry Duel Club.
Schubel Quill / Schubel Kayama (加(か)山(やま)シュベール, Kayama Shubēru)
Voiced by: Yugo Sato (Japanese); Robb Morelia (English)
A member of the Heavy Cavalry Duel Club, who is constantly accompanied by Pidgetrap, his pet pigeon.
Pigetrap / Dove-rap (ハトラップ, Hatorappu)
Schubel's pet pigeon, who is considered a Tactical Advisor of Goha 6th Elementary's Heavy Cavalry Duel Club.
Janko Entant / Jango Arisugawa (有(あり)栖(す)川(がわ)ジャンゴ, Arisugawa Jango)
Voiced by: YouthK Saeki (Japanese); Nicholas Corda (English)
The former president of the Student Council at Goha 6th Elementary, who holds the "Dark Rush Duel Tournament" in defiance of the Heavy Cavalry Duel Club's stance on Rush Duels.
Terra Kneadalina / Finger Chikako (フィンガー地(ち)下(か)子(こ), Fingā Chikako)
Voiced by: Chitose Morinaga (Japanese); Daisy Guevara (English)
An "assassin" who works for Goha 6th Elementary's Heavy Cavalry Duel Club, though claims to be from the Shiatsu Nether-Empire.
Caterpillio Elephantus / Caterpillio Zomyoji (象(ぞう)明(みょう)寺(じ)キャタピリオ, Zōmyōji Kyatapirio)
Voiced by: Chado Horii (Japanese); Danny Kramer (English)
The mechanic of Goha 6th Elementary's Heavy Cavalry Duel Club.
Botan Kenzaki (健(けん)崎(ざき), Kenzaki Botan)
Voiced by: Sara Matsumoto
She works with Jango and Genri in the Student Council.

=== Goha 5th Elementary ===
Kit Schrödinger / Schrödinger Nekoyama (猫(ねこ)山(やま)シュレディンガー, Nekoyama Shuredingā)
Voiced by: Yoshiki Nakajima (Japanese); Billy Bob Thompson (English)
He works for Nail Saionji and is the president of the Duel Mad Scientists.
Booster Page / Braun Honya (本(ほん)屋(や)ブラウン, Hon'ya Buraun)
Voiced by: Takuto Yoshinaga
The president of the Duelstronauts.
Lionel Alec / Leo Alec (亜(あ)鈴(れ)区(く)レオ, Areku Reo)
Voiced by: Kentaro Kumagai (Japanese); Zachary Owen Turner (English)
A member of the Duelstronauts.
Valencia Siegel / Kamome Tere (手(て)令(れ)カモメ, Tere Kamome)
Voiced by: Sara Matsumoto (Japanese); Laurie Hymes (English)
A member of the Duelstronauts.
Nana Nanahoshi / Nanaho Nanahoshi (七(なな)星(ほし)ナナホ, Nanahoshi Nanaho)
Voiced by: Ayaka Takamura (Japanese); Christina Costello (English)
Rayne and Rino's cousin, who is the President of the Battle Bug Club and Yuga Ohdo's childhood friend.

=== Goha 4th Elementary ===
Zo Ikitenai (行(いき)手(て)内(ない) 造(ぞう), Ikitenai Zō)
Voiced by: Yuki Yonai
A student at Goha 4th Elementary and the President of the Zombie Duel Club.

=== Goha Enterprises ===
President Goha (ゴーハ社(しゃ)長(ちょう), Gōha Shachō)
Voiced by: Hajime Shacho (Japanese); Brent Mukai (English)
The mysterious president of Goha Enterprises and subsequently the de facto ruler of Goha City. The stress of his job eventually gets to him, and he is discarded by the President Drone.
President Drone (社(しゃ)長(ちょう)ドローン, Shachō Dorōn)
Voiced by: Hajime Shacho (Japanese); Brent Mukai (English)
It assists President Goha in running the Goha Corporation, as it has done with many past presidents of the company. It was created to help the substitute Goha President while the Goha 6 were in space.
Mimi Imimi / Mimi Atachi (安立ミミ, Atachi Mimi)
Voiced by: Rio Suzuki (Japanese); Anjali Kunapaneni (English)
The Number 6 among the "Top of the Hexagon", the six executives of the Goha Enterprises, who is sent to Goha #7 Elementary undercover as a transfer student to investigate Rush Dueling. Mimi aspires to ascend to the rank of Goha President, but is demoted for her failure to keep her fellow Tops in check when they attempted to fire Nail. However, she discovers the Goha President after he collapses and becomes the new President after being chosen by the President Drone. She is evicted from her position after the return of the Goha 6. At the end of the series, she becomes the Vice-President of Goha Enterprises.
Goha Corporation Drone
Voiced by: Mari Kawano
Machines which control the duel rules. They have different colors and shapes.
Otes (オーティス, Ōtisu)
Voiced by: Daisuke Namikawa (Japanese); Mateo Ervin (English)
The main antagonist of the series. He is an official that works in the Development Department of Goha Corp, where he created the Sevens Roads series and gave them to Yuga when he was a child. He is also known as the Hologram Man (ホログラムの男(おとこ), Horoguramu no otoko), an urban legend in Goha City challenging duelists to test them and see if they are worthy to be known as the "King of Duels". He formed a faction with Celestia Noodlina, Terra Kneedalina, Prioria Sweedalina, Oceania Illumilina, Ghostia Taxilina, Konvoy Sagawa, and President Drone.
In the series finale, Otes is defeated by Yuga and disappears into space alongside him; he does not return two years later, leaving his fate unknown. Otes' identity and face is never revealed in the series; in the following series, Yu-Gi-Oh! GO RUSH!!, which is set in the past, Otes' identity becomes a significant plot point as several characters eventually attempt to become Otes to ensure the timeline of SEVENS takes place. Otes is later revealed to have survived his final Duel against Yuga and ended up in the Sengoku era, recreating Rush Duels in that time period.
Seatbastian / Sebastian (セバスチャン, Sebasuchan)
Voiced by: Yōhei Tadano (Japanese); Wayne Grayson (English)
A Goha Corporation Drone, specifically a massage chair drone, who serves as Nail's butler and throne. After Nail was defeated, he was assigned to aid Yuga and his friends. Nail fixed him after his duel with Terra Kneedalina.
Prioria Sweetalina / Sweets Kakoko (スイーツ過(か)去(こ)子(こ), Suītsu Kakoko)
Voiced by: Chitose Morinaga (Japanese); Daisy Guevara (English)
She resembles Celestia and Terra, and claims to have come from an ancient civilization. She works as an announcer for the Goha Corporation during the Goha Rush Duel Team Battle Royal, but her true masters are Goha 66.
Goha 66 (ゴーハ66(ダブルシックス), Gōha Daburu Shikkusu)
Voiced by: Jouji Nakata
Leader of the organization of the same name; Goha 66, who is plotting to take control of the Goha Corporation.
Oceania Illumilina / Flash Umiko (フラッシュ海(う)深(み)子(こ), Furasshu Umiko)
Voiced by: Chitose Morinaga (Japanese); Daisy Guevara (English)
She resembles Celestia, Terra, and Prioria; she replaces the latter as an announcer for the Goha Rush Duel Team Battle Royal after her departure for the past.
Yuro Goha (ゴーハ・ユウロ, Gōha Yuuro)
Voiced by: Takuya Eguchi (Japanese); Alejandro Saab (English)
A Turbo Duelist and the eldest of the Goha 6. He is also one of the six true presidents of Goha Corporation and a student of Goha Space Elementary.
Yujin Goha (Gōha Yuujin)
Voiced by: Masaki Yano (Japanese); Glen Feinstein (English)
He describes himself as a "Maritime Duelist" and he is the second-eldest of the Goha 6. He is also one of the six true presidents of Goha Corporation and a student of Goha Space Elementary.
Yuran Goha (Gōha Yuuran)
Voiced by: Soma Saito (Japanese); Peej Mele (English)
He is described as the most mysterious and reserved member of the Goha 6 and is the third-eldest. He is also one of the six true presidents of Goha Corporation and a student of Goha Space Elementary.
Yuka Goha (Gōha Yuuka)
Voiced by: Akari Tadano (Japanese); Daisy Guevara (English)
The only female member of the Goha 6. She is also one of the six true presidents of Goha Corporation and a student of Goha Space Elementary.
Yuo Goha (ゴーハ・ユウオウ, Gōha Yuuou)
Voiced by: Daiki Yamashita (Japanese); Kieran Regan (English)
One of the Goha 6, and the one who set in motion the plan to challenge Yuga and his friends to Duels by holding the Super Rush Robot hostage, though he also has his own goals behind the scenes. He is also one of the six true presidents of Goha Corporation and a student of Goha Space Elementary.
Yuga Goha (ゴーハ・ユウガ, Gōha Yūga)
Voiced by: Yuri Ise (Japanese); Christian A. Guerrero (English)
One of the Goha 6 and the most dangerous. Yuo sealed his memories when he attempted to take over the world, becoming a shy boy in a chameleon suit named Swirly (グルグル, Guruguru), who became a member of the Rush Duel Club. However, Swirls returned to his former self and resumes his place as one of the six true presidents of Goha Corporation.

=== Goha City ===
Kaizo (カイゾー, Kaizō)
Voiced by: Yūsuke Kobayashi (Japanese); Jake Paque (English)
A 'road' that Yuga Ohdo invented after modifying a Goha Corp Drone. After Yuga defeats Otes in the series finale, Kaizo disappears into space alongside Yuga but seemingly returns with him two years later. Kaizo also returns in Yu-Gi-Oh! GO RUSH!!.
Gwendoline Purdy / Gibumi Purisaki
Voiced by: Rie Kawamura (Japanese); Grace Choi (English)
Known by the stage name of Princess G (プリンセスG(ジー), Purinsesu Jī), she is a first-rate Duelist and musician who was responsible for giving Romin Kassidy the card "Prima Guitarna the Shining Superstar". She decided to quit after the Goha men wanted her to help making a song to destroy the reputation of Rush Duels. She then worked as a teacher before quitting.
Toombs / Ushiro Omaeno (御(お)前(まえ)乃(の)ウシロウ, Omaeno Ushirō)
Voiced by: TBA (Japanese); Kevin K. Gomez (English)
The bassist of the band RoaRomin.
Tyler Getz / Getta Taira (平月太, Taira Getta)
Voiced by: Rei Miura (Japanese); Barrett Leddy (English)
The drummer of the band RoaRomin and Roa Kassidy's childhood friend. He has feuds with Roa because Roa steals attention and is selfish.
Briscoe / Nick Yagi (八(や)木(ぎ)ニック, Yagi Nikku)
Voiced by: Tomohiro Shiozaki (Japanese); Bryson Baugus (English)
A friend of Saburamen.
Sushiko Maki (巻(まき) 寿(す)司(し)子(こ), Maki Sushiko)
Voiced by: Mari Uchiyama
A friend of Saburamen.
Celestia Noodlina / Noodle Sorako (ヌードル宇(そ)宙(ら)子(こ), Nūdoru Sorako)
Voiced by: Chitose Morinaga (Japanese); Daisy Guevara (English)
A petite young girl who works at a ramen store in the Garden of Curiosity and claims to be an alien from the Menmen system of the Ra Nebula. Saburaman has a crush on her. She is later revealed to work for Otas.
