= List of Yu-Gi-Oh! Arc-V characters =

The key characters as they appear in Yu-Gi-Oh! Arc-V. From top to bottom: Yuya, Yuto, Yugo, and Yuri (left). Zuzu, Celina, Rin, and Lulu (right)

The following is a list of characters from the Yu-Gi-Oh! anime series, Yu-Gi-Oh! Arc-V.

== Dimensional counterparts ==
Yuya Sakaki (榊 遊矢, Sakaki Yūya)
Voiced by: Kenshō Ono, Arisa Shida (young) (Japanese); Michael Liscio, Jr. (English)
The main protagonist of the series, Yuya is a cheerful fun-loving youth who seeks to become the greatest Dueltainer and bring smiles to everyone with his Dueltainment after being inspired by his father, Yusho Sakaki. During his first official duel years after his father mysteriously disappeared, Yuya gained the ability to use Pendulum Summoning to summon multiple monsters at once through the mysterious power of his necklace while gradually mastering all four summoning methods. Yuya then learns about the existence of his dimensional counterparts: Yuto, Yugo, and Yuri, and the worlds they originated from. Following his meeting with his counterparts and accidentally absorbing Yuto, eventually learning to communicate and consciously "trade" places, Yuya learns of an inner darkness that causes them to enter a state of rage while briefly synchronizing their minds with Yugo and Yuri. Both the darkness and the interdimensional conflict cause Yuya to nearly lose sight of his ideals before Zuzu, his mother Yoko, and his friends help him rekindle his love to make others happy, a feat that he achieved by having warring factions within the Synchro and Xyz Dimensions ceasing their fighting amongst themselves.
When Yuya arrives to the Fusion Dimension, reuniting with his father after 3 years as they mount to rescue Zuzu and her counterparts, he learns from Leo Akaba that he and his dimensional counterparts are actually the splintered reincarnations of the demon duelist Z-ARC, the darkness within the four youths which has been influencing their fusion so he can be reborn. Despite Yusho's attempt to keep him and Yuri apart, and his friends all having faith in him, Yuya ended up succumbing to Zarc's control right after he defeated Yuri. Yuya is powerless as Zarc reconstitutes himself while proclaiming the youth no more. However, when Zuzu's soul emerged from Ray, Yuya regains himself to resist Zarc long enough to cause his defeat and be subjected to the En Cards. But Riley circumvents the process by extracting Zarc from his body, leaving Yuya still merged with his counterparts as consequence after Zarc was defeated.
Once Yuya regained his memories of Zuzu, Celina, Rin, Lulu, and the other dimensions, he is told by Declan only he can expel Zarc's soul by making Riley smile, and Yuya begins a pilgrimage to the other dimensions to prepare himself by facing the other Lancers while searching for a way to save Zuzu and her counterparts. Yuya was initially afraid to summon the four dimension dragons out of fear it will awaken Zarc's soul within Riley, until his counterparts helped him realize that they inherited Zarc's ability to communicate with Duel Monster Spirits. Managing to win over the dragons prior to dueling Declan, Yuya comes to understand what kind person Zarc is before he went mad and determines to put his past life at peace as Dueltainer. After passing his Junior class and promoted into Senior class, he duels Declan and with his counterparts' support, he succeeded not only defeating Declan but also making Riley smile, pacifying Zarc's soul. He has then officially become a Professional Duelist and reunited with Zuzu who was revived with Celina, Rin, and Lulu inside her, after Ray transported all the Lancers, and the Lancers' allies to the Pendulum Dimension, and sensed his Dueltaining performance.
Yuya uses a Performapal, Magician, and Odd-Eyes deck and his ace monster is Odd-Eyes Dragon until his awakened ability to Pendulum Summon upgraded it into Odd-Eyes Pendulum Dragon. Due to the machinations of Zarc and absorbing his counterparts, Yuya also gained Yuto's Dark Rebellion Xyz Dragon, Yugo's Clear Wing Synchro Dragon, and Yuri's Starving Venom Fusion Dragon, allowing his necklace to create hybrid versions of Odd Eyes through Fusion, Synchro, and Xyz.
Zuzu Boyle / Yuzu Hiiragi (柊 柚子, Hīragi Yuzu)
Voiced by: Yūna Inamura (Japanese); Emily Bauer (English)
Yuya's childhood best friend and fellow classmate at You Show Duel School. She often carries a paper fan on her person, which she uses on Yuya or her father Skip whenever they do something foolish. She harbors romantic feelings for Yuya that is obvious to everyone except Yuya himself and acts jealous whenever Aura makes advances towards him. Following her initial lost to Julia, Zuzu asked Sora to teach her Fusion summoning so she can fight Julia on an even ground. She eventually succeeded in defeating Julia during the ARC League Championship and got Crystal Rose from her as a prize and a sign of friendship. Like Yuya, Zuzu has dimensional counterparts: Lulu Obsidian, Celina, and Rin. Zuzu and her counterparts each possess a strange bracelet that reacts whenever Yuya or any of his counterparts are proximity of each other. In her bracelet's case, it quickly teleporting one of the youths to another location. This made Zuzu a target of Leo Akaba and Duel Academy's forces as she ends up in the Synchro Dimension with Yugo.
She was reunited with Yuya in the Synchro Dimension, only to be sucked into a wormhole that sent her to Domino City in the Fusion Dimension where she was looked after by Yusho and Alexis before she was captured while the Lancers were on their way to Duel Academy to rescue her counterparts. It was only then that Zuzu and her counterparts learn that they are the splintered reincarnations of Leo's daughter Ray Akaba, their bracelets originally being the four En Cards which their original self used to split Zarc at the cost of their world and herself. She and her counterparts were then forcefully merged through Arc-V's power into an incorporeal Ray with Zuzu's bracelet restored to the En Flowers card which channels the other En Cards' power. During the battle against Zarc, Zuzu's soul briefly emerged from Ray to reach Yuya and give him the courage to resist Zarc's control so he can be defeated. Due to Riley's actions when the dimensions once more separated, with Ray ending up back in the Arc-V Reactor after being expelled from the youth's body, Zuzu wasn't able to return to the Pendulum Dimension with no one remembering her save Declan until his reenactment of Arc League Championship restored everyone's memories of her. During Yuya's last duel against Declan, Ray sensed Yuya's dueling and revived with Zuzu as the dominant aspect of their being as well as her counterparts residing inside her body, allowing her to reunite with Yuya and the others. Zuzu uses a Melodious deck. Her initial ace monster is Mozarta the Melodious Maestra until she learned Fusion Summoning from Sora Perse with Bloom Diva the Melodious Choir as her new ace monster.
Yuto / Ute (ユート, Yūto)
Voiced by: Manpei Takagi (Japanese); Michael Liscio, Jr. (English)
A young boy from the Xyz Dimension who resembles Yuya in appearance. He has the power to cause real damage in duels. Along with Shay, Yuto is on the search for Lulu who is currently captured by Leo Akaba. Yuto went to Standard Dimension after hearing Shay went there to look for Declan and followed him there. Following his arrival, he mistook Zuzu as Lulu and came to her aid when she was about to duel Sylvio, taking over the duel and defeat Sylvio. Since then, he observed Zuzu until he saw her training to learn Fusion summon, convincing him that she is not Lulu. Yuto and Yuya are both alike, they both care for their friends and do not want to hurt anyone. At the same time Yuto and Yuya are different, while Yuto is serious and cold, Yuya is positive and energetic. Unlike Shay he is not reckless and impatient, though if his anger gets the better of him, he becomes aggressive. After his defeat at Yugo's hand, he entrusted his Dark Rebellion Xyz Dragon to Yuya and got absorbed into him, initially taking over Yuya's body whenever the need presents itself with the two sensing each other. But since their arrival in the Xyz Dimension, Yuto and Yuya are able to freely communicate with each other and even swap bodies. Yuto's presence inside Yuya was kept a secret from everyone until during the duel between Shay and Kite, Yuto talked while accidentally possessing Yuya's body. Yuto ended up succumbing to Zarc's power in Yuya's Duel against Yuri and Yuya completes their original self's resurrection immediately afterwards. Due to Riley's actions when the dimensions once more separated, having aided Yuya in resisting Zarc, Yuto was presumed to have died until Shay sensed his presence within Yuya's body following the former's loss. During Yuya's duel with Jack, Yuto finally reveals himself to Yuya as he and their counterparts give Yuya their support. Yuto uses a Phantom Knights deck and his ace monster is Dark Rebellion Xyz Dragon.
Lulu Obsidian / Ruri Kurosaki (黒咲 瑠璃, Kurosaki Ruri)
Voiced by: Rin Aizawa (Japanese); Emily Bauer (English)
Shay's little sister and Yuto's friend, who is the Xyz Dimension counterpart of Zuzu Boyle. Kidnapped by Yuri when Duel Academy attacked their world, Lulu was kept in the Western Tower where she is placed under the Doctor's control by the time Kite rescues her in Shay's place. Though Lulu is released from Buggenstein's control during her duel against Shay, When she was looking for Kite, she ran into Yuya and she is once again being taken control to duel Yuya and Yuto together with Celina since she can only be freed by defeating the Doctor. After she is freed from the mind control, she and her counterparts are then sacrificed by Leo alongside to reconstitute their original self Ray while Lulu's bracelet is restored to the En Birds spell card which negates Xyz monster effects. Due to Riley's actions when the dimensions once more separated, with Ray ending up back in Arc-V after being expelled from the youth's body, Lulu was not able to return to the Xyz Dimension. During Yuya's duel against Declan, Lulu and her counterparts reacted to Yuya's dueling from within the reactor and Ray revived them in Zuzu's body to reunite with their friends. Lulu uses a Lyrilusc deck that focuses on Xyz Summoning and her ace monster is Lyrilusc - Assembly Nightingale. When her mind was controlled, she also added a Fusion Parasite to perform Fusion Summoning.
Yugo / Hugo (ユーゴ, Yūgo)
Voiced by: Shinpei Takagi, Arisa Shida (young) (Japanese); Michael Liscio, Jr. (English)
A Turbo Duelist who is Yuya's Synchro Dimension counterpart. He is somewhat dimwitted and will often get angry at people when he assumes they're saying his name incorrectly. He is an orphan who grew up in an orphanage in the slums of New Domino City. His childhood friend, Rin, was kidnapped by Yuri, leading him to traveling dimensions in hope of finding her. He met Yuto at Heartland City and mistook him as Yuri and Yuto mistook him as an ally of Duel Academy, leading to their battle but they were interrupted by the Resistance's arrival. Since then, he had looked for Yuto and eventually found him at Standard Dimension shortly after Sora was transported back to the Fusion Dimension. He then reappeared at Battle Royal, meeting Zuzu who was chased by Yuri and accidentally got transported back to the Synchro Dimension with her. After hearing the whole story from Zuzu, he was determined to help her prevent Duel Academy's invasion. Next Yugo reunited with Zuzu in Domino City in the Fusion Dimension and happy to see her alive, then he was taken to You Show Duel School in the Fusion Dimension by Zuzu and Alexis. But when Yugo infiltrates Duel Academy to find Rin, he ends up facing Yuri. It's revealed that he and his counterparts are the reincarnations of the demon duelist Zarc, leading Yugo to be absorbed by Yuri following his defeat after learning their connections. Due to Riley's actions when the dimensions once more separated, having aided Yuya in resisting Zarc, Yugo was presumed to have died until during Yuya's duel with Jack, Yugo finally reveals himself to Yuya as he and their counterparts give Yuya their support. Yugo uses a Speedroid deck and his ace monster is Clear Wing Synchro Dragon.
Rin (リン, Rin)
Voiced by: Sarah Emi Bridcutt (Japanese); Emily Bauer (English)
She is Yugo's childhood friend and Zuzu Boyle's Synchro Dimensional counterpart, being the first to be kidnapped by Yuri when he first came to the Synchro Dimension which lead to Yugo traveling across the Four Dimensions to find and save Rin from Duel Academy. She is locked in Duel Academy's Eastern Tower, but was then freed by Yugo who came to save her. However, during her time being held captive, Rin ends up under the Doctor's control via his Fusion Parasites and defeated Yugo before she is eventually released from the scientist's control after Leo Akaba sealed him into a card. Rin is then sacrificed by Leo Akaba alongside Zuzu, Lulu, and Celina to reconstitute their original self Ray while Rin's bracelet is restored to the En Winds spell card which negates Synchro monster effects. Due to Riley's actions when the dimensions once more separated, with Ray ending up back in Arc-V after being expelled from the youth's body, Rin was not able to return to the Synchro Dimension. During Yuya's duel against Declan, Rin and her counterparts reacted to Yuya's dueling from within the reactor and Ray revived them in Zuzu's body to reunite with their friends. Rin uses Windwitch deck that focuses on Synchro Summoning and her ace monster is Windwitch - Winter Bell. When her mind was controlled, she also added Fusion Parasite to perform Fusion Summoning.
Yuri / Joeri (ユーリ, Yūri)
Voiced by: Kenshō Ono (Japanese); Michael Liscio, Jr. (English)
Another person that strongly resembles Yuto, Yugo, and Yuya. He is the one responsible for kidnapping Lulu and Rin, and is ordered by Leo Akaba to capture Zuzu. He appeared during the Battle Royal, turning Halil and Olga into cards before confronting Zuzu. Unlike his counterparts, he is sadistic and cruel, seeing his given mission as a game and enjoys turning people into cards. He is very devoted to Leo and would obey his order without question, going as far as to get rid of anyone including his own allies that he thinks is getting in his way. However, after he continuously sealing people into cards, he no longer cares about Leo's order and simply cards people for his own amusement, eventually having a goal to turn every people in all dimensions into cards until he is the only person left. When Yuri learned that he, Yuya, Yuto, and Yugo are the reincarnations of Zarc, Yuri made it his goal to absorb his other selves, absorbing Yugo after he defeated him. Though Yuya defeated him after forcing him into a duel with Yusho's card on the line, Yuri ultimately got his wish to become one with his counterparts fulfilled when Zarc possesses Yuya and absorbed him. Due to Riley's actions when the dimensions once more separated, having aided Yuya in resisting Zarc, Yuri was presumed to have died until during Yuya's duel with Jack, Yuri finally reveals himself to Yuya as he and their counterparts give Yuya their support. Yuri uses a Predaplant deck and Honor Student Deck which specializes in Ancient Gear monsters, and his ace monster is Starving Venom Fusion Dragon.
Celina / Serena (セレナ, Serena)
Voiced by: Yūna Inamura (Japanese); Emily Bauer (English)
A female duelist from the Fusion Dimension that resembles Zuzu Boyle. She is an old acquaintance of Declan as met during his visit to the Fusion Dimension 3 years ago during her initial escape attempt. She came to Standard Dimension to find Shay in hope she can prove her worth to Leo Akaba, who had locked her up for years in Duel Academy. She turned Dipper into a card after she defeated him. Initially believing that Duel Academy's goal is justice, she immediately turned against them once knowing the suffering they have inflicted on others from Zuzu and Shay, leading her to join the Lancers. During Duel Academy's invasion in the Synchro Dimension, Celina ends being captured by Duel Academy and briefly placed under the Doctor's control until Leo seals the doctor into a card. Celina is then sacrificed by Leo alongside Zuzu, Lulu, and Rin to reconstitute their original self Ray while Celina's bracelet is restored to the En Moon spell card which negates Fusion monster effects. Due to Riley's actions when the dimensions once more separated, with Ray ending up back in Arc-V after being expelled from the youth's body, Celina was not able to return to the Fusion Dimension. During Yuya's duel against Declan, Celina and her counterparts reacted to Yuya's duelling from within the reactor and Ray revived them in Zuzu's body to reunite with their friends. Celina uses a Lunalight deck focused on Fusion Summoning, later receiving Pendulum monsters from Declan, and her ace monster is Lunalight Cat Dancer.

== Paradise City / Standard Dimension / Pendulum Dimension ==
=== You Show Duel School ===
Skip Boyle / Syuzo Hiiragi (柊 修造, Hīragi Shūzō)
Voiced by: Mitsutaka Itakura (Japanese); Tom Wayland (episodes 1-7) Billy Bob Thompson (episodes 8-148) (English)
Zuzu's father and You Show Duel School's owner and founder who gets emotional easily but when serious, he is a tough duelist to beat, he often refers to things as being hot-blooded. He uses a Guts Master deck.
Gong Strong / Noboru Gongenzaka (権現坂 昇, Gongenzaka Noboru)
Voiced by: Youhei Ōbayashi (Japanese); Billy Bob Thompson (English)
Yuya's childhood friend who works at his family dojo, but often comes to help him at You Show Duel School. During childhood, He was the one who always defending Yuya from bullying. He is a Steadfast style Duelist, refusing to get an Action Card and won't budge from his place even if he receive attacks. After being badly injured in his Duel with the Battle Beast, he was helped by Sylvio and Jack Atlas. Gong uses a Superheavy Samurai deck composed solely of monsters and later learns Synchro Summoning from Kit, and even later adds Pendulum Summoning to his deck, becoming the first person to Pendulum-Synchro Summon. His initial ace monster is Superheavy Samurai Big Benkei, but upon learning to Synchro Summon from Kit Blade with Superheavy Samurai Warlord Susanowo as his new ace monster.
Tate / Tatsuya Yamashiro (山城 タツヤ, Yamashiro Tatsuya)
Voiced by: Nanami Shinde (Japanese); Amanda D'Archangelis (English)
A young boy who joins the You Show Duel School after seeing one of Yuya's duels. He is quite knowledgeable about duels.
Frederick / Futoshi Harada (原田 フトシ, Harada Futoshi)
Voiced by: Kyōko Chikiri (Japanese); Marc Thompson (English)
A tubby young student of You Show Duel School, who often talks about "getting the shivers" (しびれる～, shibireru~). He uses a Doodle deck.
Allie / Ayu Ayukawa (鮎川 アユ, Ayukawa Ayu)
Voiced by: Satomi Akesaka (Japanese); Alyson Leigh Rosenfeld (English)
A young girl at You Show Duel School. She uses an Aquaactress deck. She is often mistaken to be Zuzu's little sister.

=== Leo Institute of Dueling ===
Declan Akaba / Reiji Akaba (赤馬 零児, Akaba Reiji)
Voiced by: Yoshimasa Hosoya (Japanese); Billy Bob Thompson (English)
The head of Leo Corporation, who takes an interest in Yuya's potential. He is famous as a genius Duelist who earned his pro license at age of 15. He seeks to oppose his father, Leo, forming a special team that consists of strong Duelists called Lancers to fight Duel Academy. Declan has a very serious and stoic demeanor, is very calm and collected in most situations, and only talks when it's necessary. Declan's seemingly apathy of the people who turned into cards and his decision to make Riley a Lancer made Yuya initially thought him as being heartless and only viewing them as disposable pawns, but it's later revealed that Declan actually cares for the well-beings of his friends and others, and would go great lengths to save them. Following Zarc's defeat, taking care of the infant Riley became from absorbing the evil duelist's soul, Declan is the only member of the Standard Dimension based Lancers to retain his memories while orchestrating the Junior ARC League Championship together with Yusho to restore Yuya's memories in hopes that Yuya can save his sister from her self-imposed fate. When Yuya's duels across the dimensions failed to achieve the ideal response from Riley, Declan decides to duel Yuya as the latter's final test to become Professional Duelist, which resulted in his defeat. Declan uses a D/D/D (pronounced "Triple D" and standing for "Different Dimension Demon") deck, capable of Fusion, Synchro, and Xyz Summoning, and later develops his own Pendulum Monsters after studying Yuya's actions.
Riley Akaba / Layra Akaba (赤馬 零羅, Akaba Reira)
Voiced by: Yui Ishikawa (Japanese); Alyson Leigh Rosenfeld, Erica Schroeder (Possessed by Ray) (English)
Declan's adopted younger sister and daughter of Leo and Henrietta Akaba. For most of the series, she is mistaken and referred as a boy due to her masculine clothing until the final Duel against Zarc. She is a student of Leo Institute of Dueling who is very shy and seems reluctant to Duel unless her older brother watches the match. Riley originated from a war-torn country, the ordeal of mistrust and constantly living in fear causing the girl to emotionally shut down as a defense mechanism. However, her interaction with Yuya and his friends slowly make her regain her sense of self and her meeting with Jack made Riley gain her resolve to fight to protect her comrades. Her experience as a war victim granted Riley an ability to sense and read other people's hearts, allowing her to hear the rage of Four Heavenly Dragons and a partially reconstituted Ray as consequence. In duel against Zarc, Riley allows Ray to possess her body so she can defeat Zarc. But the moment Ray defeated Zarc, Riley forced the spirit out of her body and used the En Cards' power to extract Zarc's disembodied essence from Yuya to prevent him from making another return. Since the En Cards turns all power into pure existence, Riley is reborn as an infant girl yet her quick absorption of Zarc's essence kept her from being splintered with the dimensions. However, Riley is rendered catatonic while the evil soul begins to gradually take over the child's body. Declan sees Yuya as the only person who can save Riley from being consumed by Zarc by getting the infant to smile. Riley finally able to smile once Zarc's soul inside her is pacified by Yuya's last duel against Declan, freeing her from the evil soul. Like Declan, Riley's C/C deck uses multiple summoning methods.
Henrietta Akaba / Himika Akaba (赤馬 日美香, Akaba Himika)
Voiced by: Kikuko Fujimoto (Japanese); Lianne Marie Dobbs (English)
Declan and Riley's mother and chairwoman of the Leo Corporation. She bears strong grudge against her husband, Leo Akaba, for abandoning her and the company. Her obsession for revenge resulting her to adopted Riley and conduct experiment on the girl to make her an ideal Duel soldier to fight against Duel Academy. After the dimensional war ended, she came to regret for what she had done and takes care of Riley who was reverted into infant to atone for what she had done.
Sylvio Sawatari / Shingo Sawatari (沢渡 シンゴ, Sawatari Shingo)
Voiced by: Shōgo Yano (Japanese); Michael Lockwood Crouch (English)
A narcissistic second-year student at the Leo Institute, whose father is running for Paradise City mayor, his father is a loudmouth. He first met Yuya by pretending to be his admirer and later stole his Pendulum cards, which Yuya retrieved back after he defeated him. He was injured after being defeated by Yuto and vowed his revenge against Yuya thinking it was him who injured him not knowing it was actually Yuto who did it. He later also entered ARC League Championship, but lost to Yuya again in the first round. When the Obelisk Force invaded the championship, Declan gave him special permission to once again participate in the Lancers selection by assisting Moon Shadow, Celina, and Shay, and officially becoming a Lancer after working together to defeat the Obelisk Force. He uses various decks, including Darts, Monarchs, and Yosenju, often changing them based on what he believes is the strongest, before settling on an Abyss Actor deck.
Dipper O'rion / Hokuto Shijima (志島 北斗, Shijima Hokuto)
Voiced by: Natsuki Hanae (Japanese); Daniel J. Edwards (English)
The top student in LID's Xyz course. A boy that dresses almost like a joker, Dipper uses a Constellar deck, with his aces being Constellar Pleiades and Constellar Ptolemy M7. He is turned into a card by Celina during the ARC League Championship because she mistook him as a native of the Xyz Dimension. After Zarc was defeated, he was freed from being trapped inside a card.
Kit Blade / Yaiba Todo (刀堂 刃, Tōdō Yaiba)
Voiced by: Kengo Takanashi (Japanese); Robby Duncan Sharpe (English)
The top student in LID's Synchro course. A boy who carries a wooden sword around and is one of Gong's mentors. Kit uses an X-Saber deck, with his ace being XX-Saber Gottoms.
Julia Krystal / Masumi Kotsu (光津 真澄, Kōtsu Masumi)
Voiced by: Arisa Kiyoto (Japanese); Kate Bristol (English)
The top student in LID's Fusion course. She is determined to take down the duelist that hurt her Fusion Course Teacher Marco. She is initially a rival of Zuzu's, and eventually sees her as an equal when Zuzu defeats her during the ARC League Championship, giving her the Crystal Rose card as a sign of respect. Julia uses a Gem-Knight deck, with her aces being Gem-Knight Master Diamond and Gem-Knight Lady Brilliant Diamond.
Claude / Nakajima (中島, Nakajima)
Voiced by: Yūki Hayashi (Japanese); Ryan Andes (English)
He works for the Leo Institute of Dueling including for Declan and Henrietta Akaba and informing them about the new duel summoning called Pendulum Summoning.

=== ARC League Championship ===
Aura Sentia / Mieru Hochun (方中 ミエル, Hōchun Mieru)
Voiced by: Aoi Yūki (Japanese); Sarah Natochenny (English)
A young fortune teller who excels in prophecies and seeks out her "fated one". Japanese name means "reading your fortune". Aura uses a Prediction Princess deck, which focus on Flip Summoning and Ritual Summoning, her ace being Prediction Princess Tarotrei. She develops a crush on Yuya following her first duel with him, much to the dismay of both Yuya and Zuzu.
Reed Pepper / Michio Mokota (茂古田 未知夫, Mokota Michio)
Voiced by: Yasuaki Takumi (Japanese); Jason Griffith (English)
A young chef who specializes in "Cooking Duels" and uses a Cookpal deck, whose strategy is to wait for his opponent to summon a monster(s), only to destroy it by returning the Royal Cookpal monsters he controls to his hand. He was turned into card during the Battle Royal in his attempt to assist Shay, Moon Shadow, and Celina. He has many fans who adores him both for his cooking and dueling. He was free from being trapped inside a card after Zarc was defeated.
Pierre L'Supérieure / Eita Kyuando (九庵堂 栄太, Kyūandō Eita)
Voiced by: Yusuke Katayama (Japanese); Wayne Grayson (English)
A snarky young duelist who is an expert at quiz shows. In Japanese, his name is a pun on "Q & A". He uses a Quiz Deck, whose main strategy is to force his opponents into answering questions and using effects to ensure they answer incorrectly, thus putting them at a disadvantage.
Grizzlepike Jones / Gen Ankokuji (暗黒寺 ゲン, Ankokuji Gen)
Voiced by: Hiroshi Shirokuma (Japanese); Ryan Andes (English)
A former student of the Strong Dojo and an admirer of Sledgehammer, who would often pick on Yuya. He uses a Battleguard deck that specializes in taking control of his opponent's monsters.
Moon Shadow / Tsukikage Fuma (風魔 月影, Fūma Tsukikage)
Voiced by: Manabu Sakamaki (Japanese); Eddy Lee (English)
A ninja duelist from the Fūma Clan Duel School who becomes a member of the Lancers after his brother, Sun Shadow, was turned into a card by Sora. He dutifully serves Declan and will obey all of his orders without question. In the Synchro Dimension, Moon Shadow purposely lose in his Turbo Duel against Shinji and acted as an informant, gathering information about Roget and then secretly reporting it to Declan. He initially swore to avenge his brother, but then forgives Sora after the latter proved his sincerity by saving him from Obelisk Force. During the battle royal after infiltrating Duel Academy, he was carded by the Battle Beast. He was revived after being trapped in a card. Moon Shadow uses a Ninjutsu Art deck.
Iggy Arlo / Isao Kachidoki (勝鬨 勇雄, Kachidoki Isao)
Voiced by: Kenji Nojima (Japanese); Jason Griffith (English)
An ace student of the Bandit Warrior Academy. He fought Yuya in a duel and initially had the upper hand but lost to him when the latter achieved his awaken state for the first time. The humiliation that he experienced caused him to hold a grudge against Yuya. Iggy returned for a rematch against Yuya in the Fusion Dimension, having accepted an offer from Dennis to come along. He is defeated once more, but finally understands the worth of Dueltaining that Yuya believes in, putting his grudge behind him. He uses a Star deck and uses a violent dueling style that causes him to physically attack his opponents to prevent them from getting Action Cards.

=== Other characters ===
Yoko Sakaki (榊 洋子, Sakaki Yōko)
Voiced by: Ryoko Yūi (Japanese); Saskia Maarleveld (English)
Yuya's mother. She used to be a biker gang leader nicknamed Loco Yoko until she met and fell in love with Yusho's Dueltainment. Though she became a mother and focused on it than dueling lately, she is still the Queen of dueling, she often provides advice to her son and she always has faith in him even when others don't. She can be Smitten by the small things like when she gave all of Yuya's breakfast to Sora just because he mistaken her to be Yuya's sister and is a big fan of Reed Pepper. Yoko uses a Biker deck, and her ace monster is Road Raven Red Queen.
Yusho Sakaki / Yusyo Sakaki (榊 遊勝, Sakaki Yūshō)
Voiced by: Hiroki Tōchi (Japanese); Michael Liscio, Jr. (English)
Yuya's handsome father, a well-known Dueltainer who disappeared three years ago before his match against the Sledgehammer. But in reality, having helped Leo set up the Solid Vision technology, Yusho ended up in the Xyz Dimension. Yusho spent three years as a teacher of Heartland Duel School's Clover branch before Leo's Duel Academy invades Xyz Dimension, with Yusho accidentally brought to the Fusion Dimension by Aster. Yusho set a duel school for children fleeing from Duel Academy together with Alexis before reuniting with Yuya and offering to help his son and Lancers infiltrate Duel Academy. After learning the truth behind Yuya, Zuzu, and their counterparts from Leo, gradually accepting the truth, Yusho is forced to immobilize his son before attempting to keep him and Yuri apart. But the duel that followed resulted with Yusho carded by Yuri who used him to force Yuya into the duel that ensure Zarc's rebirth. Soon after Zarc's defeat, Yusho was restored and ended up in the Pendulum Dimension where he helped Declan in his plan to restore Yuya's memories. Yusho uses Peformapal deck like Yuya's cards, and his ace monster is Peformapal Sky Magician.
Nico Smiley (ニコ・スマイリー, Niko Sumairī)
Voiced by: Hajime Ījima (Japanese); Bryan Tyler (English)
A weaselly manager who initially worked with the previous champion, The Sledgehammer, before Yuya defeated him. He now helps Yuya find opponents for the Junior ARC League Championship.
The Sledgehammer / Strong Ishijima (ストロング石島, Suturongu Ishijima)
Voiced by: Atsushi Miyauchi (Japanese); Will Sasso (English)
The former champion duelist who originally became champion after Yusho disappeared prior to a duel against him. After being defeated by Yuya he decided to retire as a champion and start over, much to Nico's dismay. He uses a Battleguard deck.

== Other Dimensions ==
=== Heartland City / Xyz Dimension ===
Shay Obsidian / Syun Kurosaki (黒咲 隼, Kurosaki Shun)
Voiced by: Yamato Kinjo (Japanese); Matt Shipman (English)
A duelist from the Xyz Dimension who works alongside Yuto to rescue his younger sister Lulu, Shay is a battle-hardened duelist who shows nothing but very serious and violent determination in his duel. Though his callous attitude can make him sometimes pragmatic, he deeply values his comrades and has a soft spot for children while remembering their cheers before their dimension was attacked by Duel Academy. Motivated to avenge his comrades and save Lulu from Leo, Shay went to Standard Dimension and attacked several LID members to lure out Declan, hoping to use him as bargaining chip against Leo. Upon learning the young man's relationship to his estranged father, Shay accepted Declan's offer of an alliance to fight their mutual enemy, entering the ARC League Championship to determine suitable Duelists will become Lancers. While joining the Lancers, unaware that Yuto was absorbed by his counterpart, Shay was distrustful of Yuya and the others until befriending Crow and then watching Yuya's Duel against Jack. Despite being injured protecting Saya during his duel against the Obelisk Force in Heartland, Shay went to the Fusion Dimension with Aster to save Lulu. However, he and Aster end up being among the wave of duelists to hinder Zarc while reaching Yuya and Yuto. After the dimensions once more separated, Shay left for the Fusion Dimension again to find his sister, only to learn the truth of her nature as Ray's incarnation from Leo and that she and Yuto has ceased to be. This causes an infuriated Shay to partially blaming Yuya for his actions as Zarc and accepted his challenge. Although losing the duel, he is given newfound hope that Lulu still exists from sensing Yuto's presence within Yuya. He was the first person to sense Yuto's spirit within Yuya even before Yuya himself when he thought Yuya had stolen Yuto's Dark Rebellion XYZ Dragon, he was also the first person to sense Yuto within Yuya when they all (including Yuya) thought that Yuto and the other counterparts of Zarc were dead and now only Yuya remained as Zarc's original body. He is last seen watching the final duel between Yuya and Declan, and then got transported into the Pendulum Dimension where he is reunited with Lulu who is now residing inside Zuzu. Shay uses a Raidraptor deck and his ace monster is Raidraptor Ultimate Falcon.
Kite Tenjo / Kaito Tenjo (天城 カイト, Tenjō Kaito)
Voiced by: Kōki Uchiyama (Japanese); Christopher Kromer (English)
He is an alternate universe version of the Kite Tenjo that appeared in the Yu-Gi-Oh! Zexal anime. Kite was a famous Dueltainer from Heartland City's Duel School, Clover School, the rival school of Yuto and Shay's Spade Branch. He was expected to become Heartland City's Dueltaining Champion before the invasion by Duel Academy. The destruction of his hometown and losing his family and comrades made Kite bitter and holds strong hatred for Duel Academy. He became a member of the Resistance and one of the only few who survives so far. After losing his family, he cut ties with the other Resistance members as he believes that comrades are nothing but a burden and since then continues hunting down any Duel Academy Duelist that he come across in Heartland City alone. The invasion consequently makes Kite distrustful of anyone who came from other dimensions and quickly assume them as his enemies, which leads to his Duel against Sylvio, Gong, and Yuya. After his Duel against Shay, Kite reflected on his actions and eventually rejoined Yuya and the others. He goes with Yuya, Gong and Sylvio to the Fusion Dimension, replacing Shay who was heavily injured during his Duel against the Obelisk Force. He end up being among the wave of duelists to hinder Zarc while reaching Yuya and Yuto, teaming with Shay. He is last seen watching the final duel between Yuya and Declan, and then got transported into the Pendulum Dimension. Unlike his zexal version who uses Photon deck, Kite uses a Cipher deck and his ace monster is Galaxy-Eyes Cipher Dragon.
Allen Kozuki (神月 アレン, Kōzuki Aren)
Voiced by: Michiyo Murase (Japanese); Devon Talbott (English)
He is one of the few remaining members of the Resistance. Together with Saya and Kite, he was a student from Heartland City's Duel School, Clover School under Yusho's guidance. He is cheerful and layback, immediately accepting the Lancers with open arms when Shay introduced them as his allies. His belief that Yusho has abandoned them during the invasion, however, made Allen refuses to accept Yuya who is Yusho's son, even to discover that Yuto is living inside Yuya's soul, resulting him to treat Yuya as an outsider. However, after Yuya defeats the Tyler sisters in a duel he eventually accept Yuya as his friend. He has a crush on his friend, Saya, and is very protective of her. He is last seen watching the final duel between Yuya and Declan, and then got transported into Pendulum Dimension. He uses a Railway Deck.
Saya Sasayama / Sayaka Sasayama (笹山 サヤカ, Sasayama Sayaka)
Voiced by: Ryōko Maekawa (Japanese); Laurie Hymes (English)
She is one of the few remaining members of the Resistance. Together with Allen and Kite, she was a student from Heartland City's Duel School, Clover School under Yusho's guidance. She is also a close friend of Lulu. She's a kind and shy girl who cares for her friends, but her lacking self-confidence in Duels caused her to be easily depressed and lose her spirit if someone points out her mistakes. She is haunted by guilt for her inability to muster up courage to help Lulu when she witnessed her being abducted. After seeing Shay's Duel against Kite, she determines to never run away again and will fight together with her friends. She is last seen watching the final duel between Yuya and Declan, and then got transported into Pendulum Dimension. She uses a Fairy Deck.
The Resistance (レジスタンス, Rejisutansu)
A group of Duelists that banded together after Duel Academy maliciously attacked their city. The backbone of the Resistance was formed by Duelists from the Clover and Spade branches of Heartland Duel School, who were training to become professional Duelists.

=== New Domino City / Synchro Dimension ===
Crow Hogan (クロウ・ホーガン, Kurō Hogan)
Voiced by: Shintarō Asanuma (Japanese); Christopher C. Adams (English)
He is an alternate universe version of the Crow Hogan that appeared in the Yu-Gi-Oh! 5D's anime. A Duelist of the Synchro Dimension, Crow lives in the slums of New Domino City, where he takes care of three orphans. Crow saved Yuya, Celina, Sylvio, and Riley when they were surrounded by Sector Security and lets them hide at his house. Like his friend Shinji and the other Commons in general, Crow holds deep hatred for the Topsiders. However, while Shinji focuses on creating a revolution to overthrow the Topsiders, Crow focuses more on emphasising the bonds and unity of Commons. His hatred for the Topsiders ceases after he realised that the revolution led by Shinji also got innocent children involved and it will only create another conflict between the Topsiders and Commons instead of creating an equal society. Throughout their stay in Synchro Dimension, Crow becomes a close ally to Lancers, assisting them in their mission to protect Zuzu and Celina from Duel Academy, and then helps them to thwart Roget's evil plan. After Roget's defeat, Crow officially joined the Lancers, going to Duel Academy with them where he ended up carded by the Battle Beast. He is later restored while helping Sylvio duel Zarc in an attempt to reach Yuya. He is last seen watching the final duel between Yuya and Declan, and then got transported into Pendulum Dimension. Like his 5D's version, Crow uses a Blackwing Deck and uses new Assault Blackwing monsters and his ace monster is Assault Blackwing - Raikiri the Rain Shower.
Shinji Weber (シンジ・ウェーバー, Shinji Wēbā)
Voiced by: Kaito Ishikawa (Japanese); Graham Halstead (English)
He is one of Crow's close friends, a Commons who nurses a vengeful grudge against the Topsiders and seeks to incite revolution. After being sent to the underground following his loss against Yuya, he inspires and leads the Commons to rebel against the Topsiders, successfully leading them to escape from underground and causes a riot in New Domino City. He stopped his rebellion once Yuya's Dueltaining manages to reach him, leading him and his friends to give their support to Yuya, who in turn successfully united both the Topsiders and Commons. Shinji uses a Battlewasp deck, with his aces being Battlewasp - Ballista the Armageddon and Battlewasp - Hama the Conquering Bow.
Jack Atlas (ジャック・アトラス, Jakku Atorasu)
Voiced by: Takanori Hoshino (Japanese); Ted Lewis (English)
He is an alternate universe version of the Jack Atlas that appeared in the Yu-Gi-Oh! 5D's anime. Titled the Master of Faster, he is the strongest Duelist in New Domino City. He is a duelist native from Commons and the first Commons to win the Friendship Cup, allowing him to reside in New Domino as a Topsider. He is viewed as both a hero and traitor among the Commons. Though he appears to be arrogant, he is actually just frustrated because there's no one powerful enough to test his own limit and let him grow as Duelist. He also believes that every people has their own role, and apply this belief to cards as well, believing there's no such a thing as a useless card, something that he shares with Yuya. He became Yuya's opponent in Friendship Cup exhibition match, which he easily won in three turns. He later Dueled Yuya again in the final match, helping Yuya to realize his own Dueltaining by pointing out that he has unconsciously been imitating his father's Dueltainment. The Duel ended with his loss, but Jack was satisfied because he finally found an opponent that can exchange words with him through Dueling and allows him to grow as a Duelist. After the people of New Domino City were united, Jack goes to Duel Academy and helped Yuya defeat the Battle Beast and Sanders while among the duelists to hinder Zarc's attack. After the dimensions once more separated, Jack appeared before Yuya in the Fusion Dimension to challenge him to a duel to force Yuya to overcome his fear of using all four Dimension Dragons at once to save Riley. He is last seen watching the final duel between Yuya and Declan, and then got transported into Pendulum Dimension. Like his 5D's version, Jack uses a Red Power deck and his ace monster is Scarlight Red Dragon Archfiend.
Chojiro Tokumatsu (徳松 長次郎, Tokumatsu Chōjirō)
Voiced by: Shunsuke Sakuya (Japanese); Marc Thompson (English)
A Commons duelist who often used dueling to teach people to get along, earning the title "Hero Chojiro" ("Enjoy Chōjirō" in Japanese version). He would often give back to his fellow commons by breaking up fights by persuading the ones involved to duel each other instead, and teach young commons how to duel. When pressure from the Topsiders caused him to cheat, he was arrested and thrown into the Facility. As a result of his imprisonment, the Friendship Cup was created to bring both Commons and Topsiders together in their mutual love of dueling. It was revealed at the facility, that Crow was once one of his pupils during Crow's childhood. After meeting Yuya there, he regains his former love of dueling and joins him in the Friendship Cup, but lost to Zuzu in the first round. He is last seen watching the final duel between Yuya and Declan, and then got transported into Pendulum Dimension with Frank, Amanda, and Tarren. Chojiro uses a Flower Cardian Deck and his ace monster is Flower Cardian Lightshower.
Sector Security / Security (セキュリティー, Sekyuritī)
An organization led by the evil Jean-Michel Roget, who attempts to maintain law and order in New Domino City as well as to help him in his goal. They have two subsections in the organization Duel Chasers, who engage criminals in Turbo Duels and the Arrest Corps, who catch fugitives that escape from the Facility. They were all free from mind control when Sora and Moon Shadow destroyed the control system.
Officer 227 / Duel Chaser 227 (デュエルチェイサー227, Dueru Cheisā Ni Ni Nana)
Voiced by: Hiroki Gotō (Japanese); Jason Griffith (English)
One of the Duel Chasers working for Sector Security, who use Duel Runners to catch criminal Turbo Duelists. He loses his job after failing to catch Yugo, later being given a second chance in the Friendship Cup only to lose to Yuya and sent to the underground labor facility, he and the other officers started a rebellion and beat up Lucas Swank. Like the other members of Sector Security, he uses a Goyo Deck. He's the first Synchro Duelist to Fusion summon after receiving Polymerization and Goyo Emperor from Roget.
Sergey Volkov (セルゲイ・ヴォルコフ, Serugei Vorukov)
Voiced by: Daichi Endō (Japanese); Marc Thompson (English)
A relentless criminal duelist who was sent to the underground facility and chosen by Lucas Swank to be one of the evil Jean-Michel Roget's personal duelists. He was infamous for mercilessly crushing any Duelists on his path, earning him the title "The Dueling Destroyer". It took 30 Sector Security operatives to arrest him and he was imprisoned in the Facility. However, he ran amok, resulting in heavily injured the other inmates, leading him to be sent to the underground facility. He is participating in the Friendship Cup, defeating Damon in the first round. He was defeated by Jack Atlas after merging with his Duel Runner and falls off the duel lane. He was presumedly killed by the Commons after surviving the fall. He uses a Thorn Prisoner Deck that reduces his own Life Points, and then an Earthbound Deck. Both Decks are capable of Synchro and Fusion Summoning.
Melissa Trail / Melissa Claire (メリッサ・クレール, Merisa Kurēru)
Voiced by: Yuka Hirata (Japanese); Erica Schroeder (English)
A female reporter who does live reports on Turbo Duels and serves as the MC of the Friendship Cup.
Lucas Swank / Gallagher (ギャラガー, Gyaragā)
Voiced by: Yuto Nakano (Japanese); Dennis T. Carnegie (English)
A shady manager who runs an underground duel arena. He also works in the underground garbage refinery, choosing worthy duelists to work for the evil Jean-Michel Roget. During the rebellion used by Lancers and everyone who are imprisoned in the underground, Lucas is beaten by the former Duel Chasers whom he had mistreated and is last seen in their custody.
High Council / Administrative Council (行政評議会, Gyōsei Hyōgi-kai)
Councilmen of five that is in charge of New Domino City and learns about Duel Academy invading the four dimensions from Declan. They called for Yuya and the others to be brought to them after the evil Jean-Michel Roget re-arrested all of them. There, the High Council and Declan wanted them to participate in the Friendship Cup in order for the Standard and Synchro dimensions to work together against Duel Academy. They initially intended for Declan and the evil Jean-Michel Roget to fight against each other in order to determine who wins. However, after watching how much New Domino has changed because of the Duel between Yuya and Jack, they decided to retire and abolish the current social status system, allowing the citizens of New Domino City to live equally.
Sam / Chilli (チッリ, Chirri)
Voiced by: Arika Takase (Japanese); Florian Knorn (German); David Errigo Jr. (English)
A boy from the Commons who serves as a bellboy at the hotel the Friendship Cup duelists are participating in. He admired Jack as a symbol of the Commons, but after being likened to Tuning Magician, a low level card, he believes that Jack is looking down on people like him. Sam gives this card to Yuya and wants him to defeat Jack and give it back to him once he beats Jack. Only until he learned from Yuya when he uses Tuning Magician to perform a Synchro Summon that Sam realized that Jack was trying to tell him that just like each card has its own role, every person also has their own role. Sam's admiration for Jack also returned following this realization.

=== Duel Academy / Fusion Dimension ===
Sora Perse / Sora Shiunin (紫雲院 素良, Shiun'in Sora)
Voiced by: Mie Sonozaki (Japanese); Eileen Stevens (English)
A young boy with a habit for sweets who comes to admire Yuya's dueling style and enrolls at You Show Duel School. He is also one of Zuzu's mentors. Sora can be impressed by another duelist who is as amazing as Yuya is. While initially thought to be a kind boy, he soon reveals himself to be a sadistic hunter from the Fusion Dimension who seeks to hunt Xyz users. In his Duel against Yuto, he is forcefully sent back to the Fusion Dimension when he revealed his true objective. After finding out that Leo is also targeting Zuzu, Sora revealed that he truly regards Yuya and Zuzu as his first true friends, so he initially decided to switch Zuzu with Celina, attempting to convince Yuya to go back to Standard Dimension with Zuzu so they won't be involved in the war. During his time at duel academy, he had classmates but made friends with none of them as everyone was training to be duel warriors in which Sora graduated while being at the top of his class. After meeting Yuya and Zuzu, he felt like he had finally made real friends, and had formed a friendship bond with them. It was the bond and the time spent with Zuzu that convinced Sora to protect Zuzu no matter what the cost, and save Moon Shadow from the obelisk force during duel academy's invasion in the Synchro Dimension. However, after seeing Yuya's strong resolve to protect his friends, Sora finally decided to betray Duel Academy and helps Yuya in protecting Zuzu, joining the Lancers. He was the one who took Yuya's pendant when Yuya and his counterparts were merging, he cried for Yuya when he turned into Zarc while dueling the latter showing that he cares for his friend and wants him back normal. He and Aster, end up being among the wave of duelists to hinder Zarc, while reaching Yuya. He is last seen watching the final duel between Yuya and Declan, and then got transported into Pendulum Dimension. Sora uses a Fluffal, Edge Imp, and Frightfur Deck and his ace monster is Frightfur Chimera.
Barrett (バレット, Baretto)
Voiced by: Miō Tanaka (Japanese); Marc Thompson (English)
A soldier from the Fusion Dimension who accompanies Celina to Standard. He was defeated by Declan but not before he sent his comrades Celina's location. He receives a new mission from Leo to go to the Synchro Dimension to capture Zuzu and Celina with the Obelisk Force and Yuri. He later Duels Yuya, who is protecting Celina with Riley, but was then defeated by Sergey. However, he uses the last of his strength to transport Celina back to the Fusion Dimension, fulfilling half of his mission.
Dennis McField / Dennis Mackfield (デニス・マックフィールド, Denisu Makkufīrudo)
Voiced by: Tetsuya Kakihara (Japanese); Daniel J. Edwards (English)
He is a Dueltainer from LID Broadway branch who came as an exchange student. He saved Yuya when he was cornered by Nagi and Taka in Battle Royal and later defeated Zuzu in the next duel, but lost to Celina after that. He is later revealed to be a spy from Duel Academy and an acquaintance of Yuri whom he helped to locate Lulu and Zuzu. His identity is exposed during his rematch against Shay in Friendship Cup and he was defeated in the Duel. He is sent back to Duel Academy by Sora after he takes over his mission. He informed Leo Akaba that Zuzu and Celina were in the Synchro Dimension, then he went back to the Standard Dimension and then went to Bandit Warrior Academy to recruit Iggy Arlo, promising him that he'll have revenge on Yuya. He then ambushes the You Show Duel School at the Fusion Dimension and Duel Kite when he was chasing after Yusho and his students. After being defeated by Kite, Yusho tried to convince Dennis to join them. But Dennis is too guilt ridden over betraying the Lancers to accept and turned himself into a card. Following Zarc's defeat, Dennis is restored and serves as Yuya's opponent in the Xyz Dimension as they hold a duel to both test the youth and restore morale among the Xyz Dimension residents. Following his loss, Dennis is allowed to teach dueltainment to the children of Xyz Dimension. He is last seen watching the final duel between Yuya and Declan, and then got transported into Pendulum Dimension. Dennis uses a Performage deck that specialises in Xyz Summoning and Pendulum-Xyz Summoning, later upgrading it to also use Fusion Summoning, with his ace monster being Performage Trapeze Magician. He also possesses an Ancient Gear deck much like the Obelisk Force.
Obelisk Force (オベリスクフォース, Oberisuku Fōsu)
The main attack force of Duel Academy, referring to the Obelisk Blue class of Yu-Gi-Oh! GX. They use Ancient Gear decks and are capable of turning people into cards.
Jean-Michel Roget (ジャン・ミシェル・ロジェ, Jan Misheru Roje)
Voiced by: Masamichi Kitada (Japanese); Darren Dunstan (English)
The head of Sector Security in New Domino City of the Synchro Dimension. He is later revealed to be from the Fusion Dimension, but he betrayed Duel Academy as his true ambition is to control and turn the Synchro Dimension into his own personal empire. He was gathering strong Duelists for this purpose, but all of his plans were thwarted by Jack and the Lancers. In desperation, he kidnaps Zuzu in attempt to use her as a bargaining chip so he won't be branded a traitor by Leo and is confronted by Declan, leading them to Duel. He lost and attempts to escape back to Duel Academy with Zuzu, but this was thwarted by Jack and Crow. Driven mad by his loss, Roget tries to destroy the entire Synchro Dimension using his interdimensional transport device, but a malfunction creates a wormhole that sucked him instead, he was probably killed in that wormhole as it led to the void between dimensions. He uses an Ancient Gear deck.
Alexis Rhodes / Asuka Tenjoin (天上院 明日香, Tenjōin Asuka)
Voiced by: Sanae Kobayashi (Japanese); Emlyn Morinelli McFarland (English)
She is an alternate universe version of the Alexis Rhodes that appeared in the Yu-Gi-Oh! GX anime. She is a former honor student of Duel Academy who was known for defeating Duelists who tried to woo her. Like Celina, she initially believes that what Duel Academy is doing is justice, but after hearing what happened in Xyz Dimension from a girl, she started to doubt Duel Academy's goal. She and that girl were the first to defect and they both decided to run away from Duel Academy and head to Domino City, but the girl was turned into card in the process by Juvenile Officers while Alexis was saved by Yusho. After hearing everything from Yusho, she helped him built You Show Duel School and since then helps other Duelists who ran away from Duel Academy and she is infamous among Juvenile Officers for defeating their duelists while saving the students who escaped, and she's 1 of Leo Akaba's Top 10 most wanted students. She saves Zuzu from the Juvenile Officers and brings her to You Show Duel School, next she and Zuzu both took Yugo with them to You Show Duel School in the Fusion Dimension, and then accompanies Yusho with Kite to Duel Academy. While Yusho went ahead to Leo's place with Declan and Riley, she along with Sora stays behind to duel Yuri who was ordered to defeat them. Despite her attempt to change Yuri, she is defeated and sealed into a card. After Zarc's defeat, like everyone who were turned into cards, she returned to normal. She is last seen watching the final duel between Yuya and Declan, and then got transported into Pendulum Dimension. Like her GX version, Alexis uses a Cyber Girl deck and her ace monster is Cyber Angel Vrash.
Aster Phoenix / Edo Phoenix (エド・フェニック, Edo Fenikkusu)
Voiced by: Akira Ishida (Japanese); Oliver Wyman (English)
He is an alternate universe version of the Aster Phoenix that appeared in the Yu-Gi-Oh! GX anime. He is the Commander-in-Chief of Duel Academy for the invasion of Xyz Dimension. He is a strong loyalist of Duel Academy's goal and dismissed Yusho's philosophy of bringing Duels with smiles. However, after being defeated by Yusho's Dueltaining and experienced joy for the first time in Dueling, Aster becomes torn between Yusho's and Leo's teaching. To prove that Leo's goal is correct, he keeps looking for Yusho for a rematch since his defeat, but instead encounters Yuya who then becomes his target of resentment. His second Duel against Yuya helped Aster to see the errors of his way, resulting him to defect from Duel Academy and convinced his subordinates to do the same. To atone for what he did, he dedicated himself in rebuilding the Xyz Dimension, though he later also joins the battle at Duel Academy. While at duel academy, Aster learned out about Yuya, Yuto, Yugo, and Yuri being the reincarnation of Zarc. He and Kite did their best to stop Zarc from resurrecting, but they failed. He end up being among the wave of duelists to hinder Zarc while reaching Yuya, teaming with Sora. He was the one who saw how much Sora truly cares for Yuya when he cried for him when he turned into Zarc. Following Zarc's defeat, Aster returns to the Xyz Dimension to continue rebuilding Xyz Dimension and oversees Yuya's duel with Dennis. He is last seen watching the final duel between Yuya and Declan, and then got transported into Pendulum Dimension. Like his GX version, Aster uses a Destiny Hero deck and his ace monster is Destiny Hero - Dystopia.
Juvenile Officers (補導員, Hodō-in)
A group of officers employ by Duel Academy and hired by Leo Akaba to capture runaway Duelists who escape from them. Alexis Rhodes is infamous around them after she defeated a large number, making her 1 of Leo Akaba's Top 10 most wanted students.
Mamoru Noro (野呂 守, Noro Mamoru)
Voiced by: Tasuke Nishimura (Japanese); Sam Black (English)
He is the Deputy Commander of Duel Academy that is stationed in Heartland City with Aster to seal everyone in cards. He has a habit of making calculations on Duel Academy's schedule and Duel to the smallest detail and got restless if his calculations are wrong. He asked Leo Akaba to send the Tyler sisters to the Xyz Dimension to deal with the lancers. After Aster and Tyler Sisters decided to defect from Duel Academy and joined Yuya, Mamoru is forced to surrender and help them in rebuilding Xyz Dimension when Kite and his Resistance allies cornered him. He and the Tyler sisters were put in charge of rebuilding the Xyz Dimension while Aster went with Shay to the Fusion Dimension. He is last seen watching the final duel between Yuya and Declan, and then got transported into Pendulum Dimension. In Japanese version, he is nicknamed "Noroma-chan" (blockhead or slowpoke) by the Tyler Twins.
Gloria Tyler (グロリア・タイラー, Guroria Tairā)
Voiced by: Yō Taichi (Japanese); Alyson Leigh Rosenfeld (English)
The older twin of Tyler sisters. They are both infamous among the Resistance for defeating the majority of the Spade School Duelists, the school where Yuto, Shay and Lulu came from. She and her younger twin sister Grace was sent to the Xyz Dimension by Leo Akaba to go after the Lancers. Upon arriving they defeated Allen, Saya, Gong, and Sylvio but was defeated by Yuya and Shay. She is serious, blunt, and an aggressive woman with a huge ego as a Duelist, taking offence if someone thought that she and her sister will lose a duel. Her seriousness also makes her can be quite impatient and easily annoyed if her opponent doesn't meet her criteria. After being defeated by Yuya, she is captivated by his Dueltaining, though to a lesser extent than her sister. Her stubbornness also initially made her refuse to admit her interest in Yuya's Dueltaining until her sister urged her to be honest with herself, convincing her to join Yuya and his friends together with Grace and Aster. After defecting from Duel Academy, she and her sister atone their past mistakes by helping in rebuilding the Xyz Dimension. She along with her younger twin sister and Noro were put in charge of rebuilding the Xyz Dimension while Aster went with Shay to the Fusion Dimension. She is last seen watching the final duel between Yuya and Declan, and then got transported into Pendulum Dimension. Gloria uses an Amazoness deck and her ace monster is Amazoness Empress.
Grace Tyler (グレース・タイラー, Gurēsu Tairā)
Voiced by: Mai Fuchigami (Japanese); Alyson Leigh Rosenfeld (English)
The younger twin of Tyler sisters. They are both infamous among the Resistance for defeating the majority of the Spade School Duelists, the school where Yuto, Shay and Lulu came from. She and her older twin sister Gloria was sent to the Xyz Dimension by Leo Akaba to go after the Lancers. Upon arriving they defeated Allen, Saya, Gong, and Sylvio but was defeated by Yuya and Shay. Unlike her sister, Grace is more soft-spoken and sarcastic, usually likes to make mocking remarks to her opponents to shatter their concentration. She is also a more carefree woman than her sister as she doesn't mind losing as long as she has fun in the Duel. After being defeated by Yuya's Dueltaining, Grace takes interest in Yuya's Dueltaining to the point she got excited when watching him Duel even though they are supposed to be enemies and even willing to neglect her mission. This interest eventually sprouted her desire to try Dueltaining, convincing her sister to betray Duel Academy and join forces with Yuya and his friends. After defecting from Duel Academy, she and her sister atone for their past mistakes by helping in rebuilding the Xyz Dimension. She along with her older twin sister and Noro were put in charge of rebuilding the Xyz Dimension while Aster went with Shay to the Fusion Dimension. She is last seen watching the final duel between Yuya and Declan, and then got transported into Pendulum Dimension. Grace uses an Amazoness deck and her ace monster is Amazoness Pet Liger.
Captain Cutter / Captain Solo (キャプテン・ソロ, Kyaputen Soro)
Voiced by: Daichi Hayashi (Japanese); Marc Thompson (English)
Captain Cutter is the captain of the pirate ship that the Lancers use to travel to Duel Academy, until he ambushed them while Celina who was brainwashed by the evil Doctor has taken Zuzu back to Duel Academy. He challenged Yuya to a duel, until Sora stepped in and helped Yuya win the duel. After his defeat, he ordered his shipmates and tried to follow Declan's boat, but the function of the steering wheel was broken thanks to Moon Shadow causing the ship to running in circles, plus causing it to sink.
The Doctor (ドクトル, Dokutoru)
Voiced by: Takayuki Miyamoto (Japanese); Chad Sheveland (English)
The Doctor he is one of the Leo's closest aides, and an evil mad scientist, possessing the technology to brainwash individuals through the use of his "Fusion Parasite" cards which he used on Lulu, Rin, Celina, and then Zuzu. He tried to take control of Yuya's brain with one of his parasites, but Z-ARC's presence in the youth's body rendered him immune. When the Doctor brought the four girls into Leo's throne room to begin merging the dimensions, he wanted to duel Yuya but he ended up being carded by Leo for his dangerous thinking with Zuzu and her counterparts freed from his control.

=== Original Dimension ===
Zarc (ズァーク, Zāku)
Voiced by: Kenshō Ono (Japanese); Michael Liscio Jr. (English)
He is the original owner of the Four Heavenly Dragons and one of the true creators of Pendulum Summon and central antagonist of the series. In the past, he was a Duelist who claimed to be able to hear the voices of monsters and connect his heart with them. This made him a very skilled and undefeated Duel champion, widely known as a superstar for mastering Fusion, Synchro, and Xyz summonings. Though he originally dueled for fun and to make everyone happy, the stress Zarc suffered from the people's continuous demands for violent duels drove him mad and turned him into a violent and egotistic sadist who lives for a challenge. This led Zarc to fuse himself with his dragons and become Supreme King Z-ARC / Supreme King Dragon Zarc (覇王龍ズァーク, Haōryū Zāku), going on a rampage before Ray stopped him by scattering his essence with the En Cards, cards made from pure energies of nature. Zarc's fragmented soul, his vengeful desire for revenge partly creating the Pendulum necklace that grants Pendulum Summoning, reincarnated into four boys: Yuya, Yuto, Yugo, and Yuri. Prior to the revelation of his existence, giving Yuya the ability to Pendulum Summon, Zarc occasionally manifests as a darkness within his incarnations whenever they were overwhelmed by anger or if two or more of the dragons are summoned at the same time, causing them to enter a state of rage that made them only thinking of defeating their opponents.
During his incarnations' awakened states, their minds momentarily blended, Zarc would take control of the youths and influence them into physically merging back into his original body. It was after Yuya defeated Yuri, who respectively absorbed Yuto and Yugo prior, that Zarc consciously took over Yuya's body to complete his resurrection. Despite Zarc explained that Yuya is no more as he and his counterparts have fulfilled their purpose to reconstitute him, he is gradually irked by the continuous dueling and his fear of losing revealed. Yuya eventually able to metaphysically fight against Zarc's control that led to his defeat at Ray and Riley's hands. The moment Zarc is defeated, he is extracted from Yuya's body and absorbed by Riley using the En Cards' power. However, instead of splintering him back into four incarnations, only Yuya was revived which make him the main body of Z-ARC and the youth's revived identity. Though a prisoner within Riley's catatonic infant body, Zarc begins to slowly take control so he can resume his rampage. Declan theorizes that only by Yuya making Riley smile would exorcize Zarc and stop him for good, though Yuya gradually learns of the person Zarc originally was during his duel with Declan and determines to remind Zarc how he once was to help him find peace. During Yuya's final duel against Declan, Zarc eventually found peace as Riley smiled, letting go of his past to peacefully passed on. Zarc uses a Supreme King Deck that uses the Four Heavenly Dragons and all four types of summoning, his ace monster being his Supreme King Z-ARC form.
Ray Akaba (赤馬 レイ, Akaba Rei)
Voiced by: Mai Fuchigami (Japanese); Emily Bauer, Erica Schroeder (Possessing Riley) (English)
She was Leo Akaba's daughter in the Original Dimension and the focus of the Revival Zero Project and one of the true creators of Pendulum Summon. To stop Zarc who almost completely destroyed the whole world, Ray stole the En Cards, four spell cards imbued with Earth's natural energies, Flower, Moon, Wind, and Bird, that Leo had created and sacrificed herself in place of her father, resulting the world to be split into four dimensions and the purifying power of the cards partly created the Pendulum necklace that grants Pendulum Summoning. Like Zarc, her soul was then split into four pieces reincarnated into four girls: Zuzu, Celina, Rin, and Lulu. With the exception of Celina, due to Leo's interference, the other incarnations were placed with their respective Zarc incarnations as part of Ray's intent to keep an eye on the youths in case Zarc manifests. Leo's ultimate goal is to revive Ray by merging her incarnations back into one while restoring the Original Dimension. Though her reincarnations were all transferred into the Arc-V Reactor, Leo's hastiness only restored the En Cards while Ray was in a partially corporeal state within the core. After telepathically guiding Riley to borrow her body, Ray manages to regain the En Cards and defeat Zarc with Yuya's help, only for Riley to expel her from her body and use the cards' power to seal Zarc's disembodied essence into herself. As a result, Ray is displaced from the En Cards' effect with none of Ray's incarnations returning to their respective restored dimensions. Ray's body is revealed to be still trapped inside the Arc-V Reactor in an inactive state, with even Leo not knowing what is happening to her and her incarnations. During Yuya's duel against Declan, Ray reacted to Yuya's dueling from within the reactor and she revived as Zuzu with her counterparts now residing inside her.
Leo Akaba (赤馬 零王, Akaba Reo)
Voiced by: Daisuke Namikawa (Japanese); Billy Bob Thompson (English)
Declan and Riley's father and former owner of the Leo Corporation, Leo is originally a resident of the Original Dimension where he developed the ARC System and incorporated it with Duel Monsters. When Zarc and his four dragons went on a rampage, Leo developed the four En Cards to seal them away. But his daughter Ray stole the cards and use them to splintering their reality, a displaced Leo ends up in the Standard Dimension in an amnesic state. He worked with Yusho to develop the ARC System from scratch before regaining his memories, abandoning his new life to travel the dimensions to find Ray. It only meeting Celina in the Fusion Dimension that Leo learned that Ray splintered herself into four separate girls, establishing Duel Academy and using his students to launch an interdimensional campaign to gather all four of Ray's splintered incarnations. Once Zuzu was captured, Leo proceeds to merge her and her counterparts back into Ray while restoring the Original Dimension. Though his hastiness failed to fully revive Ray, it restored the En Cards which he takes to defeat Zarc like he had planned to do before. But Zarc quickly defeated Leo before giving him the chance to use the En Cards on him. After Zarc's defeat and Arc-V split into four dimensions once more, the remorseful Leo tries to find out what happened to Ray while assuming the worst case scenario that her incarnations have ceased to be. After Yuya defeats Declan, Leo got transported to Pendulum Dimension just as Ray's body started to react. As Zuzu is revived and reunited with Yuya, Leo finally comes into terms with Ray's death and finally accept her passing. Now he counts on Yuya to make the world as 1 through his dueling.
Four Heavenly Dragons (四天の竜, Shiten no Ryū)
They are a quartet of Duel Monster spirits that consists of Odd-Eyes Dragon, Dark Rebellion Xyz Dragon, Clear Wing Synchro Dragon, and Starving Venom Fusion Dragon. They were originally belonged to Zarc, who considered them the strongest dragons of their respective summoning type, and used them in violent manners in his duels following the audience's demands. The resulting continuous violent duels caused the dragons to harbour hatred for humanity for forcing them to fight. When Zarc was driven mad and summoned them, the four dragons finally got their chance to unleash their rage towards humans before Zarc fused with them to become Supreme King Z-ARC. When Ray splintered Zarc's essence with the En Cards, each of the Four Dragons ended up in the possession of Zarc's incarnations.
After Odd-Eyes was transformed into Odd Eyes Pendulum Dragon, all four dragons would call out to each other whenever summoned at the same time to awaken Zarc within his incarnations so they can merge again. However, Zarc ends up defeated again with the dragons now in Yuya's possession though he was fearful of using them. While Yuya initially assumed the dragons were reviving Zarc out of their mutual grudge towards humanity, he learned once mustering the courage to summon them all during his duel against Jack that they are actually afraid of Ray since Zarc's first defeat by her would render them powerless. This convinces Yuya to prove to the dragons that they are strong enough as they are without needing to be merged into the Supreme King, with the dragons themselves responding to Yuya's desire to protect as they helped him win his duel against Jack. After Declan's defeat, the four dragons finally let go of their resentment towards humanity and was able to find peace through Yuya's Dueltaining.
