= List of Yu-Gi-Oh! VRAINS characters =

The following is a list of characters from the Yu-Gi-Oh! anime series, Yu-Gi-Oh! VRAINS.

== Characters ==
=== Main characters ===
Yusaku Fujiki (藤木 遊作, Fujiki Yūsaku) / Playmaker (プレイメーカー, Pureimēkā)
Voiced by: Shōya Ishige (Japanese); Jake Paque (English)
A calm and intelligent 16-year-old high school student whose secret work as a hacker has made him prefer not to stand out or interact with others. As Playmaker, he fights against the Knights of Hanoi to uncover the truth of his past. Ten years prior to the events of the series, he was kidnapped along with five other children, including Jin, Specter, Theodore, and Miyu, and imprisoned in a room, where he was forced to fight and win duels in order to be fed. During his imprisonment, Roken (Varis) encouraged him and told him to think of three reasons to live, which led to his habit of giving three reasons for his actions. Although he and the children were rescued six months later, the trauma of his imprisonment scarred him; wanting to put his past behind him, he became determined to uncover the truth behind his kidnapping. At the beginning of the series, he captures an Ignis he calls, Ai and holds him hostage during his battles against the Knights. In the second season, three months after defeating Varis and saving LINK VRAINS, Queen places a bounty on him despite his heroic actions, as Ai returned to his possession despite him having freed him. After learning that Jin's stolen consciousness is connected to the destruction of Cyberse, Yusaku becomes determined to stop the war between humanity and the Ignis and teams up with Akira Zaizen, Skye, Emma, and the Knights of Hanoi. After he defeats Bohman and saves humanity, those who were erased are revived and SOL Technologies removes the bounty on him after Ai defeats Queen. He reluctantly fights against Ai to save SOL Technologies, after which he leaves to go on a journey in the Network. There's a strong indication he's determined to search for Ai & still find a way for humans & Ignis to coexist, no matter what.
He uses a Cyberse Deck that focuses on Link Summoning, with his ace monsters being Decode Talker and Firewall Dragon; he previously used a Warrior Deck before obtaining his Cyberse Deck. In Season 2, he masters Ritual, Fusion, Synchro and Xyz Summoning with Cyberse Magician, Cyberse Clock Dragon, Cyberse Quantum Dragon, and Firewall eXceed Dragon. He also evolves his Firewall Dragon into Link-5 Firewall Dragon Darkfluid. Yusaku's skill is Storm Access, which allows him to add one random Link Monster from a Data Storm to his extra deck if his life points are 1,000 or less. In season 2, Ai creates a new Skill called Neo Storm Access. Like Storm Access, Yusaku has to have 1,000 life points or less, but it allows him to add any random monster from the Data Storm to his extra deck rather than just Link Monsters. Another feature of Neo Storm Access is that if Yusaku does not add a monster from the Data Storm to his extra deck, if he has 100 life points or less, he can add any random monster from the Data Storm to his extra deck and then draw one card.
Ai (アイ)
Voiced by: Takahiro Sakurai (Japanese); Michael Liscio Jr. (English)
An A.I. program with free will known as an Ignis (イグニス, Igunisu), who both SOL Technologies and the Knights of Hanoi seek. Five years prior to the events of the series, when the Knights attacked and destroyed his home world of Cyberse, he sealed it away to save it from destruction at the cost of being unable to return home. In the process, Cracking Dragon devoured him, causing him to lose most of his memories. While he attempts to escape from Yusaku, he traps him in his Duel Disk to use him as leverage against the Knights. After capturing him, Yusaku names him Ai after the fact that he is an AI program and was an eyeball when they met. It is later revealed that Dr. Kogami created him ten years ago during the Lost Incident based on Yusaku, with his story of losing his memories being a lie to prevent Yusaku from questioning him. After Varis is defeated, Ai returns to Cyberse to find it destroyed, leading him to return to Yusaku and work alongside him after learning that Cyberse's destruction and Jin's stolen consciousness are connected. He ultimately frees himself from Playmaker's Duel Disk and sacrifices himself, but returns because of the backup he placed in Roboppy.
He is the main antagonist of Season 3, where he assumes human form with the help of SOL Technologies' android SOLtis, with Roboppi accompanying him. He duels and wins against Queen, putting her in the hospital to avenge Earth. He then steals her code key and leaves a message for Akira, telling him that he will use his code key to take over SOL Technologies. Along with Roboppi, he defeats Akira and the Duelists protecting him and steals their consciousness, except for Playmaker, Soulburner, and Revolver. After Roboppi's defeat, Ai invites Playmaker to come to SOL Technologies' factory, leading to their final Duel. During the Duel, Ai reveals that Lightning had left a message in case he lost, showing a simulation in which he, as the sole surviving Ignis, would lead to the extinction of humanity. Ai then ran his own simulations and they all produced the same results, with Yusaku dying to protect him in the simulations causing him to fall into despair. Fearing that he may become like Lightning and Bohman and not wanting Yusaku to die, Ai decides to delete himself. He is seemingly deleted after Playmaker defeats him, but is revealed to have survived.
Ai uses @Ignister deck, which is modeled after his fallen comrades. He tends to summon many monsters through spell cards and monster effects to quickly perform Link Summon. For spells and traps, he uses the "A.I." archetype. Each @Ignister monster represents him and his fellow Ignis. Doyon @Ignister and Dark Templar @Ignister represent Ai, Achichi @Ignister and Fire Phoenix @Ignister represent Flame, Hiyari @Ignister and Water Leviathan @Ignister represent Aqua, Doshin @Ignister and Earth Golem @Ignister represent Earth, Bururu @Ignister and Wind Pegasus @Ignister represent Windy, and Pikari @Ignister and Light Dragon @Ignister represent Lighting. He also enhances Bohman's programming and obtains his most powerful card, the Link 6 Monster The Arrival @Ignister, which represents the combined power of all the Ignis.
Skye Zaizen / Aoi Zaizen (財前 葵, Zaizen Aoi) / Blue Angel (ブルーエンジェル, Burū Enjeru) / Blue Gal / Blue Girl (ブルーガール, Burū Gāru) / Blue Maiden (ブルーメイデン, Burū Meiden)
Voiced by: Yuki Nakashima (Japanese); Emily Cramer (English)
Yusaku's classmate and a member of the duel club, who, as Blue Angel, was a Celebrity Duelist and popular duel idol. She is the younger step-sister of Akira Zaizen, the head of security of SOL Technologies. Since Akira rarely came home from work, Skye became determined to use her career as a Celebrity Duelist to gain recognition from him. After being Deleted during a duel with Playmaker after Specter tricks her into playing a card, Skye realizes that Akira cared for her and is torn between following his request to never enter LINK VRAINS and her desire to continue dueling. However, after Emma provoked her, Skye decides to reenter LINK VRAINS and defeats Baira, gaining Akira's recognition by freeing the Deleted, but Specter defeats her. In the second season, she becomes Ghost Gal's partner in investigating the Ignis and creates a new avatar, Blue Gal, which she uses when on missions with Ghost Gal. She joins Playmaker's side in the Ignis War to stop Lightning's plans and save Aqua from Shepherd. After learning that Lightning infected her childhood friend Miyu, whom she met ten years before the events of the series, with a computer virus and put her in a coma, she teams up with Aqua, changing her avatar to Blue Maiden, and fights to save her. After Playmaker defeats Bohman, Miyu recovers and she visits her in the hospital. Her ace monster is Trickstar Holly Angel and she uses a Trickstar Deck that focuses on Link Summoning and effect damage. As Blue Maiden, she uses a Marincess deck that Aqua created. In Season 2, she masters Fusion Summoning. In Season 3, she learns that Yusaku is Playmaker.
George Gore / The Gore (Go 鬼塚 豪, GO Onizuka)
Voiced by: Daiki Hamano (Japanese); Daniel J. Edwards (English)
A famous Celebrity Duelist who was raised in an orphanage and works as a Duelist to repay his debt to the orphanage. Gore was admired by the children of the orphanage until Playmaker gains their admiration following his victory against a Knight, causing him to see him as his rival. To win back his fans, he lures Playmaker into a trap and duels him; although he loses, his dueling wins back the children of the orphanage. He later helps Playmaker battle the Knights, defeating Dr. Genome and challenging Varis, but loses. In the second season, he quits being a Celebrity Duelist, giving his Gouki deck to Kenji and Yozaka, and becomes a bounty hunter to hunt down Playmaker for SOL Technologies and regain his former glory. He serves as an antagonist after being experimented on under Queen, defeating Earth and having his data implanted in his brain, but returns to normal some time after his second duel with Playmaker.
After becoming a bounty hunter, he uses a Dinowrestler Deck and masters Fusion and Synchro Summoning, with his new ace monsters being Dinowrestler King T Wrextle, Dinowrestler Chimera T Wrextle, and Dinowrestler Giga Spinosavate.
Theodore Hamilton / Takeru Homura (穂村 尊, Homura Takeru) / Soulburner (ソウルバーナー, Sourubānā)
Voiced by: Yuki Kaji (Japanese); Eddy Lee (English)
A mysterious Duelist who first appears alongside the fire Ignis, Flame, while watching the duel between Playmaker and Bohman, and helps Playmaker by interfering to challenge Bit and Boot as he pursues Bohman and Harlin. He was also a victim of the Lost Incident. After his parents died in an incident while searching for him, Theodore cut himself off from everyone except for his grandparents and friend Kiku and often skipped school. He also swore to never Duel again until he met Flame and learned about the Lost Incident. Deciding to confront his life, he befriends Yusaku and Kolter and joins their cause. Although he is able to duel again, he fears the Despair from the Dark card, which repeatedly defeated him during his time in captivity, until he overcomes his trauma with Flame's encouragement. After Playmaker defeats Ai, he returns to his hometown and introduces Kiku to LINK VRAINS. He uses a Salamangreat Deck and his ace monster is Salamangreat Heatleo. His skill is Burning Draw, which lowers his life points to 100 and allows him to draw one card from his deck for every thousand life points he lost.
Flame (不霊夢 "フレイム", Fureimu)
Voiced by: Taku Yashiro (Japanese); Marc Thompson (English)
The Fire Ignis, who was in the possession of Theodore, whom he was based on. After the destruction of Cyberse, Flame approached Theodore and encouraged him to confront his life, leading to their partnership. Bohman later absorbs him and Windy, and he is erased after Bohman is defeated.

=== Knights of Hanoi ===
The Knights of Hanoi (ハノイの, Hanoi no Kishi) were a mysterious hacker group that hacked by Dueling in LINK VRAINS to destroy Cyberse, which exists in the depths of the Network. Their soldiers used DARK Machine decks and their ace monster was Cracking Dragon.

Roken Kogami / Ryoken Kogami (鴻上 了見, Kōgami Ryōken) / Varis / Revolver (リボルバー, Riborubā)
Voiced by: Shunsuke Takeuchi (Japanese); Daniel J. Edwards (English)
The leader of the Knights of Hanoi and Playmaker's main rival. He is the main antagonist of the first season, who seeks to destroy Cyberse. Varis is distrusting of the Internet, believing it to be a world of fiction. After Playmaker's third duel with Bohman, he becomes his ally despite wanting to duel Yusaku again as Playmaker, and later apologizes to Theodore as Soulburner for his father's past actions. Varis uses a Rokket Deck, and his ace monster is Borreload Dragon. In Season 2, he masters Synchro and Xyz Summoning, and in Season 3 masters Fusion Summoning. After losing to Soulburner, he and the Knights decide to atone for their crimes and sins and build a better future for themselves.
Specter (スペクター, Supekutā)
Voiced by: Kajimoto Daiki (Japanese); Billy Bob Thompson (English)
Varis' right-hand man, who was one of the six children kidnapped in the Lost Incident. Unlike the other children, Specter enjoyed his time in captivity, feeling that he was being tested and needed for a greater purpose. Because he was orphaned and abandoned as a baby, he struggled to connect with others, leaving him alone and bored with society until the Lost Incident occurred. After the Incident, Specter felt lonelier when he was returned to the orphanage and decided to run away, returning to where he was held captive. This led to Varis finding him and inviting him to join the Knights. Since then, Specter has been loyal to Varis, fulfilling his wishes at all costs and showing cruelty to those who oppose the Knights. Despite being on opposing sides, Specter is distraught over the death of Earth, his Ignis. Specter uses a Sunavalon/Sunvine Deck that focuses on restoring his LP.
Kiyoshi Kogami (鴻上聖, Kōgami Kiyoshi)
Voiced by: Takayuki Sugō (Japanese); H.D. Quinn (English)
The founder of the Knights of Hanoi, the creator of the Ignis, and Varis's father. Ten years prior to the events of the series, he kidnapped six children for the Hanoi Project, which led to the creation of the Ignis. Seven years prior to the events of the series, he seemingly died, but his consciousness remained in LINK VRAINS, with Roken taking care of his body in the real world. He dies after Playmaker and Varis' third duel, entrusting Varis to kill the Ignis he created, believing them to be a threat to humanity. It is later revealed that Lightning infected him.
Faust (ファウスト, Fausuto)
Voiced by: Satoshi Mikami (Japanese); Ryan Andes (English)
One of Varis's childhood friends, who is dedicated to him and determined to follow him to the end, even if means being branded a criminal. After Genome and Baira lose and are purged, Aso kidnaps Shima, who he mistakes as Playmaker's ally after seeing him use Cyberse Wizard. He lures Playmaker into dueling him, but loses and is purged, which he recovers from after the events at the Tower of Hanoi.
He uses a Motor Worm Deck and uses Motor Worm Spreader Queen as his ace card.
Clarissa Turner / Kyoko Taki (滝響子, Taki Kyōko) / Baira (バイラ, Baira)
Voiced by: Ami Koshimizu (Japanese); Syndi Szabo (English)
One of Varis's childhood friends. She and Aso started the plan of transforming duelists into Anothers to lure out Playmaker. Unlike most of the Knights, she doubts Kogami's plan and worries about the burden of the crimes that Varis will carry if the plan is executed. After Blue Angel challenges her, inspired by her belief in herself, she decides to free the Deleted victims after losing against Blue Angel. However, this causes Varis to purge her, and she is sent to prison after the downfall of the Knights until Varis breaks her out.
She uses a Virus Deck and uses Dark Mummy Surgical Forceps as her ace card.
Dr. Genome (ドクター・ゲノム, Dokutā Genomu)
Voiced by: Takuya Kirimoto (Japanese); H.D. Quinn (English)
Ten years prior to the events of the series, he was one of Dr. Kogami's assistants, who helped him plan and execute the Hanoi Project. Along with Kogami, Aso, and Clarissa Turner, he helped create the Ignis – six AI with free will based on the victims of the Lost Incident and the Duel Monsters attributes. When Lightning infected Dr. Kogami with a computer virus to cover up the Hanoi Project, he helped recreate his consciousness inside the network and served as a Knight since then. After losing to The Gore, Varis purges him, which he recovers from after the events at the Tower of Hanoi. He uses a Helixx Deck.
Pandor (パンドール, Pandōru)
Voiced by: Kim Hyang-Ri (Japanese); Grace Choi (English)
An Anti-Ignis AI that Varis created, who can split herself into four copies that can share information with each other. Three of the copies are erased when The Gore, Ghost Gal, and Shepherd are defeated, with the fourth one being spared because Ai spares Blue Maiden to make her feel his pain. She uses a Topologina deck.

=== SOL Technologies ===
The company in charge of Link VRAINS. In season 2, they hire a group of bounty hunters led by Queen to hunt Playmaker and capture Ai, succeeding in capturing and dissecting the Earth Ignis due to Gore's efforts. Shepherd later discovers that Queen plans to capture and dissect the Ignis to create a new, more powerful Ignis. In season 3, Ai takes over the company after defeating Queen and Akira, planning to use SOLtis to make copies of himself. After Ai's defeat, Akira regains control of the company.

Akira Zaizen (財前晃, Zaizen Akira)
Voiced by: Shouma Yamamoto (Japanese); Barrett Leddy (English)
The Security Manager of SOL Technologies and Skye's older stepbrother, who seeks Ai in order to find Cyberse and save the company. He lived with Skye, but rarely came home because of his work. After Playmaker's Duel against Varis, Zaizen is demoted from his position after he overhears of an incident that happened ten years ago that SOL Technologies caused and seeks to find the truth. After the Knights' downfall, he regains his original position as Security Manager and Queen forces him to hire a team of bounty hunters to capture Playmaker. It is also revealed that he was a bounty hunter three years before the events of the series, working alongside Ghost Gal and Shepherd. Bohman later takes his consciousness, but he stops the Neuron Link, and is revived after Playmaker defeats him. In Season 3, he is promoted to Executive Director and gathers a group of Duelists to protect him from Ai while learning that Yusaku is Playmaker, and is later promoted to CEO.
Queen (クイーン, Kuīn)
Voiced by: Megumi Koyama (Japanese); Alyson Leigh Rosenfeld (English)
The Vice-Chairwoman of SOL Technologies and one of the higher-ups at SOL Technologies, who is Akira's current boss. She places a bounty on Playmaker and rehires Akira as Security Manager, putting him in charge of assembling a team of bounty hunters to capture Playmaker and Ai. She serves as an antagonist in Season 2, seeking to dissect the Ignis to create a new, more powerful Ignis. After losing to Ai, she is hospitalized.
Bishop (ビショップ, Bishoppu)
Voiced by: IKKAN (Japanese); Marc Thompson (English)
One of the higher-ups at SOL Technologies, who communicates through a hologram of a bishop chess piece.
Knight (ナイト, Naito)
Voiced by: Masaaki Yano (Japanese); Sam Black (English)
One of the higher-ups at SOL Technologies, who communicates through a hologram of a knight chess piece.
Rook (ルーク, Rūku)
Voiced by: Koichi Makishima (Japanese); Michael Liscio Jr. (English)
One of the higher-ups at SOL Technologies, who communicates through a hologram of a rook chess piece.
Kitamura (北村)
Voiced by: Masayuki Kato (Japanese); Wolfe Scott (English)
Akira's former boss and replacement as Security Manager of SOL Technologies, who serves as a minor antagonist, being in charge of the project to create an army of AI to protect LINK VRAINS from hackers. He is cruel, often threatening to fire his employees and cut their salary when something goes wrong. Specter defeats him and he is absorbed into the Tower of Hanoi.
Risa Hayami (早見)
Voiced by: Chihiro Ikki (Japanese); Rachel Slotky (English)
Akira's co-worker, who has a crush on him and has worked for SOL Technologies for three years. She works alongside him when he returns to his position as manager and supports him three months later after Ai's downfall.

=== Den City ===
Cal Kolter / Shōichi Kusanagi (草薙 翔一, Kusanagi Shōichi)
Voiced by: Subaru Kimura (Japanese); Sam Black (English)
A hacker and Yusaku's ally, who helps him fight the Knights to save his younger brother, Jin, who was a victim of the Lost Incident. It is implied that he knows about a mysterious group of people who used to ride the Data Storm, as he recognizes the Data Storm when Ai manifests one.
Emma Bessho (別所エマ, Bessho Ema) / Ghost Gal / Ghost Girl (ゴーストガール, Gōsuto Gāru)
Voiced by: Yuna Kamakura (Japanese); Megan MacPhee (English)
A Cyber Treasure Hunter who steals information and sells it for profit, accepting jobs from anyone, most often Zaizen or SOL Technologies, as long as she receives high payment for her services. After becoming curious about SOL Technologies and Ignis, Emma challenges Playmaker to a Duel, offering the backdoor to SOL Technologies' database as a prize if he wins, and decides to team up with Zaizen to infiltrate it after he defeats her. After losing to Varis, she is the first victim to be absorbed into the Tower of Hanoi, but is revived after Playmaker defeats Varis and saves LINK VRAINS. In the second season, she is offered a job as a bounty hunter to pursue Playmaker, but refuses because she owes him her life. It is also revealed that she was a mercenary who worked alongside Akira and Shepherd three years prior to the events of the series and that Shepard is her older half-brother. Bohman takes her consciousness, but she is revived after Playmaker defeats him. She and Shepherd later duel Roboppy, but are defeated and erased; after Playmaker defeats Ai, they are revived and form a partnership three months later.
She uses an Altergeist Deck and her ace monster is Altergeist Primebanshee. In Season 2, she masters Synchro Summoning.
Naoki Shima (島 直樹, Shima Naoki) / Brave Battler (ブレイブマックス, Bureibumakkusu)
Voiced by: Chiharu Sawashiro (Japanese); Marc Thompson (English)
Yusaku's classmate and a member of the Dueling Club, who is a fan of Playmaker. Despite liking Duel Monsters and owning the newest Duel Disk, he lacks confidence in his skill and does not enter LINK VRAINS. When the Knights go on a rampage in LINK VRAINS, he receives a portion of card data of Cyberse Wizard, which he believes to be from Playmaker, and enters LINK VRAINS under the username Lonely Brave, defeating a Knight using Cyberse Wizard. After becoming overly confident, he changes his username to Brave Battler. Aso then kidnaps him to lure Playmaker out, but is saved after Playmaker defeats Aso and is inspired to make his own path after receiving words of encouragement from Playmaker. Bohman takes his consciousness to create a Neuron Link, but he is revived after Playmaker defeats him. He uses a Baboon deck.
Frog (カエル, Kaeru) and Pigeon (鳩, Hato)
Frog Voiced by: Tomokazu Seki (Japanese); Marc Thompson (English)
Pigeon Voiced by: Tomokazu Seki (Japanese); Billy Bob Thompson (English)
LINK VRAINS reporters who search for scoops about Playmaker. Varis captures them for eavesdropping, and, although Specter lets them go, Windy captures them again and they are forced to work for Lightning.
Jin Kolter / Jin Kusanagi (草薙仁, Kusanagi Jin)
Voiced by: Ryōta Suzuki (Japanese); Ryan Nicolls (English)
Kolter's younger brother and one of the victims of the Hanoi Project. During the Lost Incident, Lightning mentally tortured him, causing him severe trauma that rendered him unresponsive. Three months after the destruction of Hanoi Tower, his consciousness is stolen and locked in LINK VRAINS under Lightning's control, with her using him as a puppet. During the duel with Varis, Lightning frees him from his control and uses him as a hostage to make Varis hesitate to deliver the final blow until Bohman retrieves Jin's data. However, Lightning kept a part of Jin's data, which he used as an extra Life Point to avoid defeat. After Playmaker defeats Bohman, he is revived and loses his memory of the Lost Incident because the data was his memory. By the end of the series, he completely recovers and begins working at Cal's food truck.
Miyu Sugisaki (美(み)優(ゆ), Miyu Sugisaki)
Voiced by: Natsumi Fujiwara (Japanese); Anne Chamberlain (English)
Skye's childhood friend and one of the victims of the Hanoi Project, being Aqua's Origin. She was separated from Skye for ten years after Skye lied to her mother in her defense about losing her mother's ring, causing her mother to forbid them from playing. She was in a coma after Lightning infected her with a computer virus, but she awakens from her coma after Playmaker defeats Bohman and reconciles with Skye.
Kenneth Drayden / Kengo Dojun (道順 健碁, Dōjun Kengo) / Shepherd / Blood Shepherd (ブラッドシェパード, Buraddo Shepādo)
Voiced by: Takanori Okuda (Japanese); Danny Kramer (English)
A bounty hunter known for his ruthless nature who SOL Technologies hires to hunt down Playmaker and Ai, whom he resents because of a car accident that damaged his right arm to the point and paralyzed his mother's spine. He is Emma's half-brother because they share the same father, whom he resents for abandoning him and his mother for his job and after discovering that he has started a new family. After discovering SOL Technologies's true reasons for wanting the Ignis, Shepherd quits working for them and sets out to hunt the Ignis. He encounters Lightning and challenges him to a duel, but is defeated and erased, but is revived after Bohman is defeated. He is later summoned to protect Akira and prevent Ai from stealing his code key, and he and Ghost Gal duel Roboppy, but are defeated and erased. They are revived after Ai is defeated and is last seen working together with his sister. Shepherd uses a Drone deck.
Kiku Kamishirakawa (上白河 綺久, Kamishirakawa Kiku)
Voiced by: Miyu Shimabukuro (Japanese); Ashley Eileen Bucknam (English)
Theodore's friend from his hometown.

=== Ignis ===
AI with free will created by Dr. Kogami through the Hanoi Project.

Windy (ウィンディ, Windi)
Voiced by: Chihiro Suzuki (Japanese); Bryan Tyler (English)
The Wind Ignis, who is defeated by Varis and infected with a virus. While he recovers, Soulburner defeats him and Lightning incinerates him, transferring his Data into Flame. He and Flame are later absorbed by Bohman, and he is erased after Bohman is defeated. He uses a Stormrider deck that focuses on Field Spells and controlling no cards in his Spell & Trap Zones.
Earth (アース, Āsu)
Voiced by: Fumihiro Okabayashi (Japanese); Billy Bob Thompson (English)
The Earth Ignis, who is based on Specter and has feelings for Aqua. He is captured after The Gore defeats him and Queen dissects him, implanting his data into The Gore and corrupting his monster G Golem Crystal Heart. After Playmaker's second duel with The Gore, Ai retrieves G Golem Crystal Heart and returns it to Aqua. He and Aqua are absorbed by Bohman, and he is erased after Bohman is defeated. He uses a G Golem deck focused on protecting Crystal Heart.
Aqua (アクア, Akua)
Voiced by: Ayako Kawasumi (Japanese); Lindsay Sutton (English)
The Water Ignis and the sub-leader of the Ignis, who was based on Miyu and has the ability to tell the difference between truth and lies. She was imprisoned by Lightning until Earth freed her. Blue Gal later rescues her from Shepard and tells her about Miyu, and she later teams up with Blue Maiden to fight Lightning. After Playmaker's second duel with The Gore, Ai retrieves G Golem's Crystal Heart and returns it to her, giving her deck to Skye. She and Earth are absorbed by Bohman, and she is erased after Bohman is defeated.
Lightning (ライトニング, Raitoningu)
Voiced by: Issei Maeda (Japanese); Marc Schenfisch (English)
The Light Ignis and the leader of the Ignis, who was based on Jin Kolter. He works alongside Windy until he incinerates him after losing to Soulburner. He is the series' central antagonist, being responsible for destroying Cyberse, imprisoning Aqua, manipulating Windy and using him as a pawn, traumatizing Jin, and infecting Dr. Kogami and Miyu with computer viruses. His goal is to create a powerful Ignis, a goal shared by Queen. After his duel with Varis, he is absorbed by Bohman, and erased after he is defeated. He uses an Armatos Legio deck that is heavily focused on swarming the field.

=== Mirror LINK VRAINS ===
Bohman (ボーマン, Bōman)
Voiced by: Kenji Matsuda (Japanese); Sam Black (English)
A third generation AI created by Lightning as a vessel to unify all of the Ignis into one perfect body. In Season 2, he serves as a secondary antagonist, stealing Jin's consciousness, later becoming the main antagonist after Lightning's death. He absorbs Flame, Windy, Earth, Aqua and Lightning, and erases Blue Maiden, Soulburner and Jin. After Playmaker defeats him, he is erased. He uses a Hydradrive deck focused on anti-Attribute tactics, and can use Storm Access as well as Master Storm Access in his fourth duel with Playmaker.
Harlin / Haru (ハル, Haru)
Voiced by: Ryoko Shiraishi (Japanese); Dan Rosales (English)
A second generation of AI created by Lightning, who is erased after being defeated by Blue Maiden. He uses a Hydradrive deck.
Bit (ビット, Bitto)
Voiced by: Kento Fujinuma (Japanese); Billy Bob Thompson (English)
A first generation of AI created by Lightning, who can combine with Boot into a single Avatar called "BitBoot" who is capable of using two Skills. It uses a D-Scale deck.
Boot (ブート, Būto)
Voiced by: Masaaki Yano (Japanese); Michael Liscio Jr. (English)
A first generation of AI created by Lightning, who can combine with Bit into a single Avatar called "BitBoot" who is capable of using two Skills. It uses a D-Scale deck.
