= A Taste of Space =

A Taste of Space may refer to:

- "A Taste of Space" (Battle for Dream Island), a 2020 web series episode
- "A Taste of Space", a 2020 episode of Yu-Gi-Oh! Sevens season 1
