= Yu-Gi-Oh! Go Rush!! season 2 =

Yu-Gi-Oh! Go Rush!!
- Season 2
- No. of episodes: 51

Release
- Original network: TV Tokyo
- Original release: April 2, 2023 – March 24, 2024

Season chronology
- ← Previous; Season 1 Next → Season 3

Yu-Gi-Oh! Go Rush!! is the seventh spin-off anime series in the Yu-Gi-Oh! franchise and the eleventh anime series overall. It is produced by Bridge and broadcast on TV Tokyo. The series is directed by Nobuhiro Kondo. Toshimitsu Takeuchi is in charge of series' scripts, and Kazuko Tadano and Hiromi Matsushita are designing the characters. This season follows Yudias, Yuhi and Yuamu as they face several new threats including the Ryugu Brothers and Kuaidal Velgear, as they discover the origins of the Velgearians and their eventual fate.

This season uses three theme songs. From Episodes 52–102, the opening theme is "Soul Galaxy" by BRADIO. From episodes 52-77, the first ending theme is Cosmos" by Taichi Mukai. From episodes 78–102, the second ending theme is "Song of Departure" (旅立ちの唄, Tabidachi no Uta) by 175R.

An edited English dub of the second season premiered on ITVX in the United Kingdom on August 11, 2026 and on Disney XD in the United States on October 3, 2026.

== Episode list ==
No. overall	No. in season	English dub title / Japanese translated title	Directed by	Written by	Storyboarded by	Original release date (Note: The series premiered on TV Tokyo on April 3 at 7:30 a.m. JST.)	American air date
52	1	"Welcome Home, Yudias" / "Yudias Returns"; Transliteration: "Kaettekita Yuudiasu!" (Japanese: 帰ってきたユウディアス！)	Mizuno Kentaro	Higuchi Tatsuto	Kondo Nobuhiro	April 2, 2023	October 3, 2026
53	2	"Found Footage" / "Yuhi: The Runaway Chronicles"; Transliteration: "Yūhi Yasagure Retsuden" (Japanese: 遊飛やさぐれ列伝)	Hishikawa Naoki	Nomura Yuichi	Hishikawa Naoki	April 9, 2023	October 10, 2026
54	3	"Yuna vs. The Traitor" / "Yuna's Determination"; Transliteration: "Yūna no Ketsui" (Japanese: ユウナの決意)	Yamada Nao	Yamada Kenichi	Furuta Jouji	April 16, 2023	October 17, 2026
55	4	"Duel to Rule the School" / "Alien School #8"; Transliteration: "Dai-hachi Uchūjin Gakkō" (Japanese: 第8宇宙人学校)	Miyoshi Masato	Matsui Aya	Kondo Nobuhiro	April 23, 2023	October 24, 2026
56	5	"Road of Regrets" / "Yuhi's Road"; Transliteration: "Yūhi no Rōdo" (Japanese: 遊飛のロード)	Fukumoto Shinichi	Ueno Kimiko	Komoto Shogo	April 30, 2023	October 31, 2026
57	6	"Rush Rebellion" / "Operation: Take Back the Surface"; Transliteration: "Chijō Dakkan Sakusen" (Japanese: 地上奪還作戦)	Takayama Tomoya	Yamaguchi Hiroshi	Takayama Tomoya	May 7, 2023	November 7, 2026
58	7	"No Good Deed" / "The Commander Exposed"; Transliteration: "Hadaka no Sōsui" (Japanese: 裸の総帥)	Mikamoto Yasumi	Yamada Kenichi	Komoto Shogo	May 14, 2023	November 14, 2026
59	8	"Keeping Secrets" / "Phaser's Secret"; Transliteration: "Feizā no Himitsu" (Japanese: フェイザーの秘密)	Sumio Watanabe	Hiroshi Yamaguchi	Akira Nishimori	May 21, 2023	November 21, 2026
60	9	"Un-Phazed" / "Yuamu's Road"; Transliteration: "Yuamu no Rōdo" (Japanese: 遊歩のロード)	Yasumi Mikamoto	Kenchi Yamada	Shogo Komoto	May 28, 2023	November 28, 2026
61	10	"Catfight" / "Cat's Duel"; Transliteration: "Kyattsu Dyueru" (Japanese: キャッツデュエル)	Unknown	Kimiko Ueno	Shinichi Watanabe	June 4, 2023	December 5, 2026
62	11	"Home Away From Home" / "Reunion"; Transliteration: "Saikai" (Japanese: 再会)	Unknown	Toshimitsu Takeuchi	Naoto Hashimoto	June 11, 2023	December 12, 2026
63	12	"Face Off with Phazer" / "The Last Dragon Chronicles"; Transliteration: "Ryū no Sumu Ie" (Japanese: 竜の棲む家)	Unknown	Aya Matsui	Tomoya Takayama	June 18, 2023	December 19, 2026
64	13	"Phazer's Final Reckoning" / "Those Who Are Born on the Star"; Transliteration: "Hoshi ni Umareta Mono-tachi" (Japanese: 星に生まれた者たち)	Unknown	Yuichi Nomura	Nobuhiro Kondo	June 25, 2023	December 26, 2026
65	14	"The Trumpet Trials" / "What's in the Box? Pu-Puku-Pu"; Transliteration: "Hako no Nakami wa Puppukupū" (Japanese: ハコの中身はプップクプー)	Unknown	Tatsuto Higuchi	TBA	July 2, 2023	
66	15	"The Galaxy Cup" / "The Galaxy Cup Begins!"; Transliteration: "Kaimaku! Gyarakushī Kappu" (Japanese: 開幕！ギャラクシーカップ)	Unknown	Kenichi Yamada	TBA	July 9, 2023	
67	16	"Fish Out of Water" / "Sogetsu's Connections"; Transliteration: "Sōgetsu no Tsunagari" (Japanese: 蒼月のツナガリ)	Unknown	Hiroshi Yamaguchi	TBA	July 16, 2023	
68	17	"Control the Role" / "The First Rush Duel"; Transliteration: "Hajimete no Rasshu Dyueru" (Japanese: はじめてのラッシュデュエル)	Unknown	Kimiko Ueno	TBA	July 23, 2023	
69	18	"Tremolo vs. Dinois"; Transliteration: "Toremoro vs Dinowa" (Japanese: トレモロvsディノワ)	Unknown	Aya Matsui	TBA	July 30, 2023	
70	19	"Attack of the Closet!"; Transliteration: "Kyōshū! Fanshī Kēsu" (Japanese: 強襲! ファンシーケース)	Unknown	Yuichi Nomura	TBA	August 6, 2023	
71	20	"A Dream for Furniture"; Transliteration: "Kagu ni Kaketa Yume" (Japanese: 家具にかけた夢)	Unknown	Tatsuto Higuchi	TBA	August 13, 2023	
72	21	"Vengeance is Mine"; Transliteration: "Fukushū suru wa Ware ni Ari" (Japanese: 復讐するはワレにあり)	Unknown	Kimiko Ueno	TBA	August 20, 2023	
73	22	"Encroachment"; Transliteration: "Shinshoku" (Japanese: 侵食)	Unknown	Kenichi Yamada	TBA	August 27, 2023	
74	23	"My Road"; Transliteration: "Atakushi no Rōdo" (Japanese: アタクシのロード)	Unknown	Hiroshi Yamaguchi	TBA	September 3, 2023	
75	24	"Karutios Plan"; Transliteration: "Karutiosu Keikaku" (Japanese: カルティオス計画)	Unknown	Toshimitsu Takeuchi	TBA	September 10, 2023	
76	25	"Proto-Velgear"; Transliteration: "Purotoberugyā" (Japanese: プロトベルギャー)	Unknown	Toshimitsu Takeuchi	TBA	September 17, 2023	
77	26	"The Creator"; Transliteration: "Sōzōshu" (Japanese: 創造主)	Unknown	Toshimitsu Takeuchi	TBA	September 24, 2023	
78	27	"Idiot Moment 88"; Transliteration: "Aho Taiken Hachijūhachi" (Japanese: アホ体験88)	Unknown	Kimiko Ueno	TBA	October 1, 2023	
79	28	"Kuaidul Spacetime"; Transliteration: "Kwaidūru Jikū" (Japanese: クァイドゥール時空)	Unknown	Yuichi Nomura	TBA	October 8, 2023	
80	29	"Luxury Space Furniture Store Providence"; Transliteration: "Kōkyū uchū Kaguya Setsuri" (Japanese: 高級宇宙家具屋セツリ)	Unknown	Aya Matsui	TBA	October 15, 2023	
81	30	"Storm Clouds Over Mutsuba Tower!"; Transliteration: "Fūun! Mutsuba Tawā" (Japanese: 風雲！ムツバタワー)	Unknown	Kenichi Yamada	TBA	October 22, 2023	
82	31	"Ladybug Bakery"; Transliteration: "Tentōmushi no Panya" (Japanese: テントウムシのパン屋)	Unknown	Tatsuto Higuchi	TBA	October 29, 2023	
83	32	"Hello, Baby!"; Transliteration: "Konnichiwa Aka-chan" (Japanese: こんにちは赤ちゃん)	Unknown	Hiroshi Yamaguchi	TBA	November 5, 2023	
84	33	"The Jobless"; Transliteration: "Hatarakazaru Mono" (Japanese: 働かざる者)	Sumio Watanabe	Kimiko Ueno	Naoto Hashimoto	November 12, 2023	
85	34	"Spacetime Classroom"; Transliteration: "Jikū Kyōshitsu" (Japanese: 時空教室)	Daiki Nishimura	Yuichi Nomura	Shinichi Watanabe	November 19, 2023	
86	35	"The Kotatsu Revolt"; Transliteration: "Kotatsu no Ran" (Japanese: 炬燵の乱)	Kentaro Mizuno	Kenichi Yamada	Shogo Komoto	November 26, 2023	
87	36	"What Will You Do, Yudias?"; Transliteration: "Dōsuru Yuudiasu" (Japanese: どうするユウディアス)	Yuzo Sasaki	Tatsuto Higuchi	Tomoya Takayama	December 3, 2023	
88	37	"The Giant of Light"; Transliteration: "Hikari no Kyojin" (Japanese: 光の巨人)	Yasumi Mikamoto	Toshimitsu Takeuchi	Shogo Komoto	December 10, 2023	
89	38	"Two Galaxies"; Transliteration: "Futatsu no Ginga" (Japanese: ふたつの銀河)	Nao Yamada	Toshimitsu Takeuchi	Nobuhiro Kondo	December 17, 2023	
90	39	"One Galaxy"; Transliteration: "Hitsotsu no Ginga" (Japanese: ひとつの銀河)	Katsuyuki Komai	Toshimitsu Takeuchi	Nobuhiro Kondo	December 24, 2023	
91	40	"Death to Spies"; Transliteration: "Supai ni wa Shi wo" (Japanese: スパイニハシヲ)	Naoki Hishikawa	Aya Matsui	Naoto Hashimoto	January 7, 2024	
92	41	"The Birth of an Animal Star"; Transliteration: "Dōbutsu Sutā Tanjō" (Japanese: 動物スタァ誕生)	Shinichi Fukumoto	Hiroshi Yamaguchi	Takeshi Mori	January 14, 2024	
93	42	"A Clockwork Zaion"; Transliteration: "Haguruma Jikake no Zaion" (Japanese: 歯車じかけのザイオン)	Tomoya Takayama	Kimiko Ueno	Tomoya Takayama	January 21, 2024	
94	43	"The Gene of Princess"; Transliteration: "Purinsesu no Idenshi" (Japanese: プリンセスの遺伝子)	Akira Tsunoda	Tatsuto Higuchi	Nobuhiro Kondo	January 28, 2024	
95	44	"Farewell, Tazaki"; Transliteration: "Saraba Tazaki" (Japanese: サラバ田崎)	Unknown	Yuichi Nomura	TBA	February 4, 2024	
96	45	"The Bowl of Silence"; Transliteration: "Chinmoku no Donburi" (Japanese: 沈黙の丼)	Unknown	Kenichi Yamada	TBA	February 11, 2024	
97	46	"The Stolen Robot"; Transliteration: "Ubawareta Robo" (Japanese: 奪われたロボ)	Unknown	Hiroshi Yamaguchi	TBA	February 18, 2024	
98	47	"Extinction"; Transliteration: "Shōmetsu" (Japanese: 消滅)	Unknown	Aya Matsui	TBA	February 25, 2024	
99	48	"The Last Cicada Samurai"; Transliteration: "Rasuto Semizamurai" (Japanese: ラストセミザムライ)	Unknown	Kimiko Ueno	TBA	March 3, 2024	
100	49	"The Obstructor"; Transliteration: "Tachihadakaru Mono" (Japanese: 立ちはだかる者)	Unknown	Toshimitsu Takeuchi	TBA	March 10, 2024	
101	50	"Resurrection of the Dead"; Transliteration: "Shisha Sosei" (Japanese: 死者蘇生)	Unknown	Toshimitsu Takeuchi	TBA	March 17, 2024	
102	51	"There Is No Victor in Space"; Transliteration: "Shōshanaki Sora" (Japanese: 勝者なき宇宙)	Unknown	Toshimitsu Takeuchi	TBA	March 24, 2024	

== Home media ==
=== Japanese ===
Marvelous co., ltd. (Japan, Region 2/A)
Volume	Episodes	Release date	Ref.
1	52–64	October 25, 2023	
2	65-77	January 24, 2024	
3	78-90	April 24, 2024	
4	91-102	July 24, 2024	
