= Yu-Gi-Oh! Sevens season 2 =

Yu-Gi-Oh! Sevens
- Season 2
- The cover of the fifth Blu-ray compilation, featuring Yuo Goha (left) and The☆Lukeman (right).
- No. of episodes: 40 (Japanese); 37 (English)

Release
- Original network: TV Tokyo
- Original release: June 20, 2021 – March 27, 2022

Season chronology
- ← Previous; Season 1 Next → Yu-Gi-Oh! Go Rush!! Season 1

Yu-Gi-Oh! Sevens is the sixth spin-off anime series in the Yu-Gi-Oh! franchise and the tenth anime series overall. It is produced by Bridge and broadcast on TV Tokyo. The series is directed by Nobuhiro Kondo. The series follows Yūga and his friends as they show off the delights of Rush Duels while under the watchful eye of the Goha Corporation that oversees the city. This season follows Yuga and his friends as they battle against the mysterious Goha Six Siblings, the true presidents of Goha Corporation. From episodes 53–92, the second opening theme is "Harevutai" (ハレヴタイ), performed by The Brow Beat while the second ending theme is "Never Looking Back", performed by Shizukunome.

== Episode list ==
No. overall	No. in season	English dub title / Japanese translated title	Directed by	Written by	Original release date	American air date (Note: For simplicity purposes on the episode table, the English air dates only reflect the televised broadcast on Disney XD in the United States. Some episodes might be streamed in advance on Hulu.)
53	1	"Give It a Swirl!" / "Let's Go! Rush Gulul!"; Transliteration: "Iku zo! Rasshu Guryuryu!" (Japanese: いくぞ！ラッシュグリュリュ！)	Shunichi Kato	Yuichi Nomura	June 20, 2021	March 25, 2023
54	2	"Turbo Rush Duel!" / "Riding Rush Duel!"; Transliteration: "Raidingu Rasshu Dyueru!" (Japanese: ライディング・ラッシュデュエル！)	Shinichi Fukumoto	Toshimitsu Takeuchi	June 27, 2021	April 1, 2023
55	3	"Water Hazards" / "Yujin and the Sea"; Transliteration: "Yuujīn to Umi" (Japanese: ユウジーンと海)	Hiroaki Kudo	Aya Matsui	July 4, 2021	April 3, 2023
56	4	"Play Ball!" / "Kattobashing!"; Transliteration: "Kattobashingu!" (Japanese: かっとバシング！)	Hiromichi Matano	Ueno Kimiko	July 11, 2021	April 4, 2023
57	5	"Kendo Conflict!" / "I'm the Fourth Assassin"; Transliteration: "Daiyon no Shikaku dosu e" (Japanese: 第四の刺客どすえ)	Masahiko Watanabe	Higuchi Tatsuto	July 18, 2021	April 5, 2023
58	6	"Pulling the Strings" / "Crossing Destinies"; Transliteration: "Kōsa-suru Unmei" (Japanese: 交差する運命)	Tomoya Takayama	Hiroshi Yamaguchi	July 25, 2021	April 6, 2023
59	7	"Order Button"; Transliteration: "Chūmon Botan" (Japanese: 注文ぼたん)	Hiroshi Akiyama	Koji Saito	August 1, 2021	N/A
60	8	"Legend of the Sevens" / "Do You Remember Atachi?"; Transliteration: "Atachi Oboeteimasuka" (Japanese: あたち・おぼえていますか)	Nao Yamada	Yuichi Nomura	August 8, 2021	April 7, 2023
61	9	"Face the Heat" / "Live! Powerful Rush Duel"; Transliteration: "Jikkyō! Pawafuru Rasshu Dyueru" (Japanese: 実況！パワフルラッシュデュエル)	Yasumi Mikamoto	Kimiko Ueno	August 15, 2021	April 8, 2023
62	10	"The Lukeman!" / "The☆Lukemen! The☆Lukemen!!"; Transliteration: "Za☆Rūkumen! Za☆Rūkumen!!" (Japanese: ザ☆ルークメン！ザ☆ルークメン！！)	Tsurumi Mukaiyama	Tatsuto Higuchi	August 22, 2021	April 15, 2023
63	11	"President Luke!" / "The Sixth Man"; Transliteration: "Dairoku no Otoko" (Japanese: 第6の男)	Ryuta Yamamoto	Aya Matsui	August 29, 2021	April 22, 2023
64	12	"Fear the Gear" / "A Family of Gears"; Transliteration: "Haguruma no Ichizoku" (Japanese: 歯車の一族)	Shinichi Fukumoto	Hiroshi Yamaguchi	September 5, 2021	April 29, 2023
65	13	"Clash of the Giants" / "Solitary Providence"; Transliteration: "Kokō no Setsuri" (Japanese: 孤高のセツリ)	Tomoya Takayama	Naoto Iyoku	September 12, 2021	May 6, 2023
66	14	"Rise of the Supervillain" / "Final Battle! Devil Empire"; Transliteration: "Kessen! Majin Teikoku" (Japanese: 決戦！魔神帝国)	Masato Miyoshi	Toshimitsu Takeuchi	September 19, 2021	May 13, 2023
67	15	"Rise of the Superhero" / "Space Warrior The☆Lukeman"; Transliteration: "Uchū Senshi Za☆Rūkumen" (Japanese: 宇宙戦士ザ☆ルークメン)	Naoto Hashimoto	Koji Saito	September 26, 2021	May 20, 2023
68	16	"The Melancholy of Yuo"; Transliteration: "Yuuou no Yūutsu" (Japanese: ユウオウのユウウツ)	Hiroshi Akiyama	Yuichi Nomura	October 3, 2021	N/A
69	17	"Fish Fight" / "Field of Fishreams"; Transliteration: "Fīrudo Obu Gyorīmusu" (Japanese: フィールド・オブ・ギョリームス)	Yasumi Mikamoto	Iyoku Naoto	October 10, 2021	May 27, 2023
70	18	"Pest Control" / "That Person, The Hidden Nanahoshi"; Transliteration: "Sono Mono, Ura Nanahoshi" (Japanese: その者、裏七星)	Matsuo Asami	Higuchi Tatsuto	October 17, 2021	June 3, 2023
71	19	"Curry Chaos" / "Danger: Do Not Mix"; Transliteration: "Mazeruna Kiken" (Japanese: 混ぜるなキケン)	Tomoya Takayama	Aya Matsui	October 24, 2021	June 10, 2023
72	20	"Stop the Presses!" / "The Fantastic Underground Luke Factory"; Transliteration: "Yume no Chika Rūku Kōjō" (Japanese: 夢の地下ルーク工場)	Shinya Sasaki	Yamaguchi Hiroshi	October 31, 2021	June 17, 2023
73	21	"Lose to Win" / "An Adult's Corporate Entertainment Rush Duel"; Transliteration: "Otona no Settai Rasshu Dyueru" (Japanese: オトナの接待ラッシュデュエル)	Nao Yamada	Iyoku Naoto	November 7, 2021	June 24, 2023
74	22	"Rush Ghoul" / "Duel Zombie"; Transliteration: "Dyueru Zonbi" (Japanese: デュエルゾンビ)	Shinichi Fukumoto	Yamaguchi Hiroshi	November 14, 2021	July 1, 2023
75	23	"Snoopin' Around" / "The Mystery of Yuga"; Transliteration: "Yūga no Nazo" (Japanese: 遊我の謎)	Ryuta Yamamoto	Aya Matsui	November 21, 2021	July 8, 2023
76	24	"Tiger Trouble!" / "The Merciless Tiger"; Transliteration: "Jihinaki Tora" (Japanese: 慈悲なき虎)	Naoto Hashimoto	Nomura Yuichi	November 28, 2021	July 15, 2023
77	25	"Monster Reborn!" / "Swirly Revival"; Transliteration: "Yomigaeru Guruguru" (Japanese: 蘇るグルグル)	Naoki Hishikawa	Higuchi Tatsuto	December 5, 2021	July 22, 2023
78	26	"Yuga vs. Yuga" / "Yuga Goha"; Transliteration: "Gōha Yūga" (Japanese: ゴーハ・ユウガ)	Yasumi Mikamoto	Toshimitsu Takeuchi	December 12, 2021	July 29, 2023
79	27	"Counting Cards" / "Rush Duel Sealed Away"; Transliteration: "Rasshu Dyueru Fūin" (Japanese: ラッシュデュエル封印)	Tomoya Takayama	Toshimitsu Takeuchi	December 19, 2021	August 5, 2023
80	28	"The Six Goha Siblings"; Transliteration: "Gōha Roku Kyōdai" (Japanese: ゴーハ6兄弟)	Masato Miyoshi	Saito Koji	December 26, 2021	N/A
81	29	"Mindwiped" / "Irreplaceable Days"; Transliteration: "Kakegaenonai Hibi" (Japanese: かけがえのない日々)	Shinichi Fukumoto	Iyoku Naoto	January 9, 2022	August 12, 2023
82	30	"Rush Duel - Duel of the Rush" / "Daor of the Rush"; Transliteration: "Dōro Obu Za Rasshu" (Japanese: ドーロ・オブ・ザ・ラッシュ)	Kentaro Mizuno	Yuichi Nomura	January 16, 2022	August 19, 2023
83	31	"Duel of the MCs" / "Journey's Companions"; Transliteration: "Tabi no Nakama-tachi" (Japanese: 旅の仲間たち)	Kazusa	Yuichi Nomura	January 23, 2022	August 26, 2023
84	32	"Secret Gig" / "Two Ideals"; Transliteration: "Futatsu no Omoi" (Japanese: 二つの想い)	Shigenori Kurii	Higuchi Tatsuto	January 30, 2022	September 2, 2023
85	33	"Stop Pretending" / "The Return of the King"; Transliteration: "Ō no Kikan" (Japanese: 王の帰還)	Nao Yamada	Higuchi Tatsuto	February 6, 2022	September 9, 2023
86	34	"Going Solo" / "The Kirishima Affair"; Transliteration: "Kirishima, Bando Yamerutte Yo" (Japanese: 霧島、バンドやめるってよ)	Ryuta Yamamoto	Aya Matsui	February 13, 2022	September 16, 2023
87	35	"Clash of Chords" / "Kirishima Melon"; Transliteration: "Kirishima Meron" (Japanese: 霧島メロン)	Tomoya Takayama	Aya Matsui	February 20, 2022	September 23, 2023
88	36	"Rush Duel Rescue" / "The Truth Behind the Kamijo Gear Company"; Transliteration: "KGC no Shinjitsu" (Japanese: KGCの真実)	Shinichi Fukumoto	Hiroshi Yamaguchi	February 27, 2022	November 4, 2023
89	37	"Tiger Tamer!" / "Tiger & Dragon"; Transliteration: "Taigā & Doragon" (Japanese: タイガー&ドラゴン)	Naoki Hishikawa	Hiroshi Yamaguchi	March 6, 2022	November 11, 2023
90	38	"Race to Space!" / "To Space!"; Transliteration: "Sora e!" (Japanese: 宇宙へ！)	Yasumi Mikamoto	Toshimitsu Takeuchi	March 13, 2022	November 18, 2023
91	39	"Showdown in Space" / "Fierce Battle! Rush Robot Duel!"; Transliteration: "Gekitō! Rasshu Robo Dyueru!" (Japanese: 激闘! ラッシュロボデュエル!)	Kentaro Mizuno	Toshimitsu Takeuchi	March 20, 2022	November 25, 2023
92	40	"End of the Road" / "King of Duels"; Transliteration: "Dyueru no Ō" (Japanese: デュエルの王)	Naoto Hashimoto	Toshimitsu Takeuchi	March 27, 2022	December 2, 2023

== Home media release ==
=== Japanese ===
Marvelous co., ltd. (Japan, Region 2/A)
Volume	Episodes	Release date	Ref.
Duel 5	53–67	December 22, 2021	
Duel 6	68–79	April 27, 2022	
Duel 7	80–92	July 27, 2022	
