= Yu-Gi-Oh! Go Rush!! season 3 =

Yu-Gi-Oh! Go Rush!!
- Season 3
- No. of episodes: 49

Release
- Original network: TV Tokyo
- Original release: April 7, 2024 – March 30, 2025

Season chronology
- ← Previous; Season 2

Yu-Gi-Oh! Go Rush!! is the seventh spin-off anime series in the Yu-Gi-Oh! franchise and the eleventh anime series overall. It is produced by Bridge and broadcast on TV Tokyo. The series is directed by Nobuhiro Kondo. Toshimitsu Takeuchi is in charge of series' scripts, and Kazuko Tadano and Hiromi Matsushita are designing the characters. This season follows Yudias and Yuhi as they battle against Yuamu, who has become the leader of a new faction called the Dark Matter Empire, as part of her ultimate plan to become "Otes" for the sake of her descendant Yuga Ohdo's future.

This season uses two theme songs. From Episodes 103 to 150, the opening theme is "Let's Duel!" (デュエルしようぜ！, Dyueru shiyou ze!) by Masayoshi Oishi. From episodes 103 to 127, the first ending theme is "STAR RUSH" (STAR(スター) RUSH(ラッシュ), Sutā Rasshu) by Ayaka Nanase. From episodes 128 to 150, the second ending theme is "It Won't Be Goodbye" (サヨナラにはならない, Sayonara ni wa Naranai) by Ayaka Nanase, replacing "STAR RUSH".

== Episode list ==
No. overall	No. in season	Title	Directed by	Written by	Storyboarded by	Original release date (Note: The series premiered on TV Tokyo on April 3 at 7:30 a.m. JST.)
103	1	"A Currygeous Journey Begins"; Transliteration: "Karei naru Tabidachi" (Japanese: 華麗なる旅立ち)	Unknown	Unknown	TBA	April 7, 2024
104	2	"Sa, Darkman"; Transliteration: "Sa, Dākumen" (Japanese: サ，ダークメン)	Unknown	Yuichi Nomura	TBA	April 14, 2024
105	3	"Captain Epoch"; Transliteration: "Kyaputen Epokku" (Japanese: キャプテンエポック)	Unknown	Tatsuto Higuchi	TBA	April 21, 2024
106	4	"My Mommy is Nyandestar"; Transliteration: "Mama wa Nyandesutā" (Japanese: ママはニャンデスター)	Unknown	Kenichi Yamada	TBA	April 28, 2024
107	5	"A Cheer from the Dark"; Transliteration: "Kurayami kara no Osu" (Japanese: 暗闇からの押忍)	Unknown	Kimiko Ueno	TBA	May 5, 2024
108	6	"Evacuation Zone"; Transliteration: "Tettai Ryōiki" (Japanese: 撤退領域)	Unknown	Hiroshi Yamaguchi	TBA	May 12, 2024
109	7	"Dark Meister"; Transliteration: "Dāku Maisutā" (Japanese: ダークマイスター)	Unknown	Aya Matsui	TBA	May 19, 2024
110	8	"It Is My Turn"; Transliteration: "Ware no tān" (Japanese: ワレのターン)	Unknown	Yuichi Nomura	TBA	May 26, 2024
111	9	"Darkman Zuwijo"; Transliteration: "Dākumen Zuwījou" (Japanese: ダークメン・ズウィージョウ)	Unknown	Tatsuto Higuchi	TBA	June 2, 2024
112	10	"Damamu's Right"; Transliteration: "Damamū no Kenri" (Japanese: ダマムーの権利)	Unknown	Hiroshi Yamaguchi	TBA	June 9, 2024
113	11	"Dark Matter Space"; Transliteration: "Dāku Matā Kūkan" (Japanese: ダークマター空間)	Unknown	Unknown	TBA	June 16, 2024
114	12	"Castle of Darkness"; Transliteration: "Yami no Shiro" (Japanese: 闇の城)	Unknown	Unknown	TBA	June 23, 2024
115	13	"Those Who Walk in the Dark"; Transliteration: "Yami o Aruku Mono" (Japanese: 闇を歩く者)	Unknown	Unknown	TBA	June 30, 2024
116	14	"That’s What Pisses Me Off about You!"; Transliteration: "Souiu Tokoro ga Mukatsukundayo!" (Japanese: そういう所がムカつくんだよ！)	Unknown	Unknown	TBA	July 14, 2024
117	15	"Mochi☆Pals"; Transliteration: "Mochi☆Tomo" (Japanese: モチ☆トモ)	Unknown	Unknown	TBA	July 21, 2024
118	16	"Toward the Earth"; Transliteration: "Chikyū e…" (Japanese: 地球へ…)	Unknown	Unknown	TBA	July 28, 2024
119	17	"DM Particles"; Transliteration: "DM Ryūshi" (Japanese: DM粒子)	Unknown	Unknown	TBA	August 4, 2024
120	18	"Ideals of the Leaders"; Transliteration: "Danchō no Omoi" (Japanese: 団長の思い)	Unknown	Unknown	TBA	August 11, 2024
121	19	"MIK of My Youth"; Transliteration: "Waga Seishun no MIK" (Japanese: わが青春のMIK)	Unknown	Unknown	TBA	August 18, 2024
122	20	"Gear Manga Kamijo-kun"; Transliteration: "Hagurumanga Kamijō-kun" (Japanese: はぐるまんが上城くん)	Unknown	Unknown	TBA	August 25, 2024
123	21	"Soy Sauce Revolution"; Transliteration: "Oshōyu Kakumei" (Japanese: オショーユ革命)	Unknown	Unknown	TBA	September 1, 2024
124	22	"Mask of Deception"; Transliteration: "Itsuwari no Kamen" (Japanese: 偽りの仮面)	Unknown	Unknown	TBA	September 8, 2024
125	23	"Road Holiday"; Transliteration: "Rōdo no Kyūjitsu" (Japanese: ロードの休日)	Unknown	Unknown	TBA	September 15, 2024
126	24	"Let the Living be Sealed into the Light"; Transliteration: "Seija wa Hikari ni Fūjirare" (Japanese: 生者は光に封じられ)	Unknown	Unknown	TBA	September 22, 2024
127	25	"The Dead Rise from the Darkness"; Transliteration: "Shisha wa Yami kara Yomigaeru" (Japanese: 死者は闇から蘇る)	Unknown	Unknown	TBA	September 29, 2024
128	26	"Carve a Road of Toil Through It All and Press Onward"; Transliteration: "Rōdō wo Kirihiraite Tsukisusume" (Japanese: 労働を切り開いて突き進め)	Unknown	Unknown	TBA	October 6, 2024
129	27	"The Insect Ninja Attack!"; Transliteration: "Konchū Ninja Raishū!" (Japanese: 昆虫忍者来襲！)	Unknown	Unknown	TBA	October 13, 2024
130	28	"White Hat and Massage Chair"; Transliteration: "Shiroi Bōshi to Massāji Chea" (Japanese: 白い帽子とマッサージチェア)	Unknown	Unknown	TBA	October 20, 2024
131	29	"Something"; Transliteration: "Samushingu" (Japanese: サムシング)	Unknown	Unknown	TBA	October 27, 2024
132	30	"A Cheer for Her Fated One!"; Transliteration: "Unmei no Osu!" (Japanese: 運命のオス！)	Unknown	Unknown	TBA	November 3, 2024
133	31	"The Name Is Otes"; Transliteration: "Sono Na wa Ōtisu" (Japanese: その名はオーティス)	Unknown	Unknown	TBA	November 10, 2024
134	32	"Tale of the Tiny Can"; Transliteration: "Chīsana Kan no Monogatari" (Japanese: 小さな缶の物語)	Unknown	Unknown	TBA	November 17, 2024
135	33	"Somewhere Similar to Here"; Transliteration: "Koko ni Nita Basho" (Japanese: ここに似た場所)	Unknown	Unknown	TBA	November 24, 2024
136	34	"The Door to That Guy"; Transliteration: "Aitsu e no Tobira" (Japanese: アイツへの扉)	Unknown	Unknown	TBA	December 1, 2024
137	35	"Dark Otes"; Transliteration: "Kuroi Ōtisu" (Japanese: 黒いオーティス)	Unknown	Unknown	TBA	December 8, 2024
138	36	"Time Power"; Transliteration: "Jikan Pawā" (Japanese: 時間パワー)	Unknown	Unknown	TBA	December 15, 2024
139	37	"Great Growth"; Transliteration: "Ōi Naru Seichō" (Japanese: 大いなる成長)	Unknown	Unknown	TBA	December 22, 2024
140	38	"Sengoku Rush Duel"; Transliteration: "Sengoku Rasshu Dyueru" (Japanese: 戦国ラッシュデュエル)	Unknown	Unknown	TBA	January 12, 2025
141	39	"Hey! Sogetsu Style"; Transliteration: "Hey! Sōgetsu-Ryū" (Japanese: Hey! 蒼月流)	Unknown	Unknown	TBA	January 19, 2025
142	40	"Princess of Beasts"; Transliteration: "Kedamono no Hime" (Japanese: けだものの姫)	Unknown	Unknown	TBA	January 26, 2025
143	41	"Usu and Dark"; Transliteration: "Usu to Kuro" (Japanese: 臼と黒)	Unknown	Unknown	TBA	February 2, 2025
144	42	"The Yudias Incident"; Transliteration: "Yuudiasu no Hen" (Japanese: ユウディアスの変)	Unknown	Unknown	TBA	February 9, 2025
145	43	"The Letter That Leapt Through Time"; Transliteration: "Toki o Kakeru Shojō" (Japanese: 時をかける書状)	Unknown	Unknown	TBA	February 16, 2025
146	44	"The Monk Who Can't Wait Until Tomorrow"; Transliteration: "Ashita Machikirenai Hōshi" (Japanese: 明日待ちきれない法師)	Unknown	Unknown	TBA	February 23, 2025
147	45	"Ten and Ran"; Transliteration: "Ten to Ran" (Japanese: 天と蘭)	Unknown	Unknown	TBA	March 2, 2025
148	46	"Moonlight Smile"; Transliteration: "Mūnraito Sumairu" (Japanese: ムーンライト・スマイル)	Unknown	Unknown	TBA	March 9, 2025
149	47	"Courage and Wings"; Transliteration: "Yūki to Tsubasa" (Japanese: 勇気と翼)	Unknown	Unknown	TBA	March 16, 2025
150	48	"An Otherworldly Final Duel"; Transliteration: "Chōjō Kessen Dyueru" (Japanese: 超常決戦デュエル)	Unknown	Unknown	TBA	March 23, 2025
151	49	"There Are Duelists Right Here"; Transliteration: "Dyuerisuto wa Koko ni Iru" (Japanese: 決闘者はここにいる)	Unknown	Unknown	TBA	March 30, 2025

== Home media ==
=== Japanese ===
Marvelous co., ltd. (Japan, Region 2/A)
Volume	Episodes	Release date	Ref.
1	103-115	October 23, 2024	
2	116-127	November 8, 2024	
3	128-139	April 23, 2025	
4	140-151	July 23, 2025	
