= Yu-Gi-Oh! VRAINS season 3 =

Yu-Gi-Oh! VRAINS
- Season 3
- No. of episodes: 17

Release
- Original network: TV Tokyo
- Original release: May 22 – September 25, 2019

Season chronology
- ← Previous; Season 2 Next → Yu-Gi-Oh! Sevens; Season 1

Yu-Gi-Oh! VRAINS is the fifth main spin-off anime series in the Yu-Gi-Oh! franchise and the ninth anime series overall. It is produced by Gallop and broadcast by TV Tokyo. The series is directed by Masahiro Hosoda. The series follows Yusaku Fujiki and takes place in a high school environment in Den City. The series features Charisma Duelists who use VR and are similar to YouTubers. The show's theme is "Let's take one step forward and try it!" This season focuses on Yusaku and his allies having to battle Ai, who turns against them and attempts to seize control of SOL Technologies for his own plans. This season uses two theme songs. From episodes 104 to 120, the opening theme is "Calling" (コーリング, Kōringu) by Kimeru, while the ending theme is "Are You Ready?" (アーユーレディ？, Ā Yū Redi?) by BiS.

The English dub of the season aired in Canada on Teletoon (episodes 104-108) from January 31, 2021, to February 28, 2021. first premiered in Australia on 9Go! (episodes 109–120) from August 27, 2021, to September 13, 2021

== Episode list ==
No. overall	No. in season	English dub title / Japanese translated title	Written by	Original release date	English air date
104	1	"Your Reign is Over" / "Declaring A Crime"; Transliteration: "Hanko Seimei" (Japanese: 犯行声明)	Shin Yoshida	May 29, 2019	January 31, 2021 (Note: The English dub of Yu-Gi-Oh! VRAINS episodes 104–108 first premiered in Canada on Teletoon.)
Ai speaking to the graves of the Ignis tells them that he made his decision. At Cafe Nom, Kolter mentions to Yusaku that Jin is recovering quickly and that he has no memories of the Lost Incident. Yusaku speculates that Lightning used Jin's memories to survive his duel with Varis. Kolter asks if Ai has returned and Yusaku admits that he hasn't and doubts that he ever will. Kolter tells him to use this moment to move on with his life. At a luxury cruise ship Ai and Roboppy hack into two SOLtis to move around. Ai and Roboppy confront Queen in her room. Ai wishes to use SOL Technologies and needs Queen's code key. He challenges her to a duel for it and to avenge Earth. Although Queen had an early lead by summoning Golden Allure Queen, Ai was able to defeat her in a single turn. Akira is informed of Queen's defeat and is shocked by the message that Ai left behind.
105	2	"Unlikely Alliance" / "Intercept"; Transliteration: "Geigeki" (Japanese: 迎撃)	Shin Yoshida	June 5, 2019	February 7, 2021
Akira wishes to meet Playmaker and Soulburner in Link VRAINS despite it being shut down. Theodore is hesitant to go, believing it to be a trap but Kolter believes it isn't as SOL Technologies removed Playmaker from their wanted list. Playmaker, Soulburner and Unnamed enter Link VRAINS to speak with Akira and Blue Maiden. Ghost Gal, The Shepherd and George Gore also arrive. Akira explains that someone attacked Queen and stole her code key. Akira owns the other half and needs protection from the culprit. Akira states that if the culprit completes the code key they can gain control of SOL Technologies. Unnamed adds that the culprit will also gain control of the network. Akira plays the message that was left behind revealing that it was Ai who attacked Queen, shocking everyone. Ai declares that in three days he will target Akira for his code key. Later Akira visits Varis who introduces him to Pandor, an Anti-Ignis AI that he created. The next day Skye takes her brother to Cafe Nom to cheer him up. While there they encounter Yusaku who admits he's Playmaker to the both of them. After Akira returns to work Skye sensing that Yusaku is conflicted about fighting Ai asks him to stay out of the upcoming battle. As everyone gets ready for the battle against Ai, Playmaker decides to join them believing as his partner it's his duty to prevent him from causing anymore harm.
106	3	"Roboppi Mops Up" / "Good Luck, Roboppy!!"; Transliteration: "Ganbare!! Roboppi" (Japanese: がんばれ！！ロボッピ)	Masaaki Tachihara	June 12, 2019	February 14, 2021
As Ai and Roboppy head to where Akira and Blue Maiden are located, Roboppy becomes worried as they are outnumbered. Ai admits that this is true and states that everyone is much stronger than him. Ai explains that the only way for Roboppy to get stronger is to defeat opponents that are more powerful that him. Playmaker encounters Ai who tells him that he plans to carry on Lightning's wishes. Soulburner and Varis also encounter Ai who engages them in a duel. The three realize that the Ai that they are facing are copies meant to stall them while the real one makes his way to Zaizen's location. The real Ai defeats both Dr. Genome and Baira and is confronted by Faust. Roboppy finds both Ghost Gal and The Shepherd and challenges them both to a duel. Roboppy uses his Appliancer monsters to quickly summon three Link Monsters. Working together with her brother Ghost Gal is able to Link Summon Altergeist Memorygant.
107	4	"Cleaning House" / "Slay the Demon"; Transliteration: "Oni o Utsu" (Japanese: 鬼を討つ)	Masaaki Tachihara	June 19, 2019	February 21, 2021
Ghost Gal uses her Altergeist Memorygant to destroy Roboppy's monsters putting him at a disadvantage. However Roboppy is able to defeat them using a new Appliancer monster. The Shepherd shields her from the attack and both of them are defeated and erased. Meanwhile Ai has defeated both Faust and Spectre. The Gore challenges the real Ai who blames him for causing Earth`s death. Gore explains that after being defeated by Playmaker, he had the AI chip removed and while recovering in the hospital he was greeted by the children of the orphanage that he abandoned. Gore vows to defeat Ai for their sake. Gore reveals that he went back to using his Gouki deck and uses his Gouki monsters to Link Summon Gouki The Master Ogre. Ai counters this by quickly summoning out Dark Templar @Ignister. Dark Templar attacks Master Ogre but Ai activates the quick-play spell TAIstrike to make its attack points the same as the monster it's battling. Ai also adds that both players will lose life points equal to the destroyed monsters attack points. However Dark Templar and Ai life points remain unscathed. Ai urges Gore to give up but he refuses to and vows to always get up no matter how many times he's knocked down.
108	5	"Smash and Mash" / "Indomitable Spirit"; Transliteration: "Futōfukutsu no Seishin" (Japanese: 不撓不屈の精神)	Shin Yoshida, Masaaki Tachihara	July 3, 2019	February 28, 2021
The Gore Link Summons Gouki Heel Ogre. He quickly sets up and summons multiple Gouki Link Monsters on his field. Gore summons a new Link Monster Gouki The Powerload Ogre and uses its effect alongside his other Gouki monsters to destroy Ai's field and leave him open for attack. Gore attack directly but Ai was able to survive the assault but activating the effect of the trap card, Ai's Hymn which was destroyed earlier. Ai activates the spell card Ai Love Yousion using one of Gore's monsters to Fusion Summon Earth Golem @Ignister. Ai uses his new monster to overcome and defeat Gore. Ai and Robopoppy arrive at the area where Akira and Blue Maiden are located only to find that they are not there. Roboppy is confused but Ai admits that he anticipated this. Arriving immediately afterwards Varis explains to both Playmaker and Soulburner that the Zaizen siblings are in an airplane while in a special network location created by him. Ai enters the airplane using a fighter jet. As he is about to enter the room where Akira and Skye are located, Ai is confronted by Pandor. The two proceed to have a duel on top of the airplane.
109	6	"AI vs. AI" / "The Ignis Hunter"; Transliteration: "Igunisu o Karu Mono" (Japanese: イグニスを狩るもの)	Shin Yoshida	July 10, 2019	August 27, 2021 (Note: The English dub of Yu-Gi-Oh! VRAINS episodes 109–120 first premiered in Australia on 9Go!.)
Pandor questions Ai about him targeting humanity and asks if he intends to hurt humans. Ai admits that he doesn't intend to but he may have to go through with it. Using her Topologina monsters Pandor is able to corner Ai and knock his life points down to 200. Pandor tells him to hand over the code key and the consciousness data of all the duelists he defeated. She wants to protect him as a fellow AI program and urges him to give back the data and flee. Ai refuses but thanks Pandor for caring. Pandor admits that she accepted the duel in order to stall for time until the airplane reaches the airport but to her surprise the plane begins to rise instead of landing. Ai reveals that he hacked into the pilot system of the airplane and is in control. Ai is able to turn the duel into his favor, overcoming Pandor's strategy and defeats her. With nothing standing in his way, Ai enters the network where the Zaizen siblings are and confronts them.
110	7	"Siblings and Circuits" / "Ai's Sad Frustration"; Transliteration: "Ai no Iradachi" (Japanese: 哀の苛立ち)	Atsushi Maekawa	July 17, 2019	August 30, 2021
Ai confronts both Akira and Blue Maiden and demands his half of the code key. Ai challenges them to a duel. Raising his hand he summons images of Playmaker, Soulburner and Varis to watch the duel. During the course of the duel Ai uses Judgment Arrows much to the shock of everyone. Ai attempts to use the effects of Judgment Arrows but Blue Maiden is able to negate this. Blue Maiden asks Ai why they are fighting each other when they both feel guilty about being unable to save Aqua and pleads with him to stop the duel. Ai becomes upset at Blue Maiden and calls her out for replacing Aqua with Pandor. Pandor responds that time keeps moving forward and that is the reason she took Aqua's place. Ai snaps back that time stopped moving for him and he can't move forward until he defeats anyone that opposes him. Akira admits that humans were responsible for creating and destroying the Ignis and apologies on the behalf of SOL Technogies. However Ai rejects the apology and demands that Akira fights for the sake of his loved ones. Working together with his sister Akira is able to Link Summon Tindangle Acute Cerberus.
111	8	"Stronger Together" / "Wanting to Fight Each Other"; Transliteration: "Semegiau Ishi" (Japanese: せめぎ合う意思)	Atsushi Maekawa	July 24, 2019	August 31, 2021
Akira uses Tindangle Acute Cerberus to attack Ai and knock his life points down to 400 and then increase his monsters attack points to 4600. Ai counters this by Ritual Summoning Water Leviathan @Ignister and use its effect to banish Tindangle Acute Cerberus from the field. Water Leviathan attacks Akira's remaining monster and uses its other effect to return all his Link Monsters to the Graveyard to increase its attack points. Ai attempts to defeat Akira with this attack but Blue Maiden activates the trap Marincess Bubble Circle to protect him. Blue Maiden uses multiple Link Summons to eventually summon a new Link Monster: Marincess Great Bubble Reef. Blue Maiden uses the effect of Marincess Bubble Circle to banish a monster from her graveyard and deal 100 points of damage to Ai while increasing the attack points of her Great Bubble Reef. Great Bubble Reef attacks Ai but he activate the trap HAi which doubles the damage between the attack of the monsters battling. The Zaizen siblings are defeated but only Akira is erased. Blue Maiden demands to know why she was spared and Ai replies that she will suffer the same way he has, by living with the regret of not being able to protect the one dear to her. Ai takes Akira's half of the code key and leaves. In the real world Skye sheds a tear for failing to protect her brother.
112	9	"All Hail Roboppi!" / "SOL's Decline"; Transliteration: "Soru sha no Chōraku" (Japanese: SOL社の凋落)	Shin Yoshida, Junki Takegami	July 31, 2019	September 1, 2021
Yusaku, Theodore and Kolter arrive at the airplane where Akira and Skye are located but are too late to help him. Ai uses the Code Keys he gained from Akira and Queen to gain control of SOL Tech. Ai proceeds to fire all the employees and replace them with the SOLtis androids. After discovering LINK VRAINS is open again, Yusaku is contacted by Varis and he goes to see him alongside Soulburner. Varis informs both of them about Ai's takeover of SOL Tech. Soulburner asks if they can find Ai But Varis responds that it's impossible due to Ai using an algorithm to control the company. With no other options Playmaker and Soulburner decide to enter Link VRAINS in search of clues. While traveling with Ai, Roboppy awakens from a dream he has. Telling Ai about it, he sees it as a sign that he will become one with the universe. Ai states that Roboppy will eventually become strong enough to not defeat him but also become strong to conquer the universe. As a reward for helping him defeat his enemies, Ai gives Roboppy an island that is filled with sentient appliances for him to rule along with data that entered his body. Roboppy enters his island and begins to play with the appliances there. While exploring LINK VRAINS Soulburner notices the island and lands on it, encountering Robopoppy there. Soulburner wishes to know where Ai is but Roboppy refuses to tell him. Roboppy challenges Soulburner to a duel promising to tell where Ai is if he wins to which the latter accepts.
113	10	"Roboppi's World" / "King of Appliances"; Transliteration: "Kaden no Ōsama" (Japanese: 家電の王様)	Junki Takegami	August 7, 2019	September 2, 2021
Playmaker arrives at the island where Roboppy and Soulburner are dueling. Through multiple Link Summons Soulburner manages to bring out Salmangreat Heatleo. Using two equip spell cards Salamangreat Claw and Fang allows Heatleo to gain 500 ATK Points and the ability to attack three times. Using the effect of these cards Soulburner is able to destroy most of Robopoppy's field and lower his life points to 1000. Soulburner tries to convince Robopoppy to live with humans but he refuses vowing to defeat the one who torments Ai. Soulburner is surprised to hear this as Robopoppy blames him for failing to protect Flame claiming that Ai wouldn't be attacking humanity if he did. Robopoppy continues stating that Ai is blaming himself for the death of his friends and is miserable because of it. Playmaker defends Soulburner pointing out that nothing could be done but Robopoppy doesn't understand and refuses to understand. Beginning his turn Robopoppy is able to Link Summon Appliancer Laundry Dragon and uses its co-linked effect to remove both Laundry Dragon and Heatleo from the field. Robopoppy then activates the Quick Play Spell Appliancer Recycle to banish two monster from his and Soulburner's graveyard to revive Laundry Dragon while Soulburner revives Heatleo. Robopoppy uses his revived monster's effect to destroy Heatleo and deal damage to equal to its attack points to Soulburner's life points leaving him with only 800 life points left.
114	11	"The Chosen One" / "Dreaming Roboppy"; Transliteration: "Yumemiru Roboppi" (Japanese: 夢見るロボッピ)	Junki Takegami	August 14, 2019	September 3, 2021
Soulburner summons Salmangreat Falco and activates Spinny's effect to revive itself from the graveyard and uses the two to Link Summon Salmangreat Sunlight Wolf. Soulburner activates Falco's effect in the graveyard, bringing back and setting Salamangreat Claw. Soulburner proceeds to Link Summon Salamangreat Heatleo once more. Soulburner uses Reincarnation Link Summon to Special Summon Heatleo and use its effect to destroy one of Roboppy's cards. Soulburner then equips Salmangreat Claw to Heatleo allowing it to attack three times. Soulburner attempts to destroy Appliancer Laundry Dragon but Roboppy activates the effect of Appliancer World to move Laundry Dragon next to Celtopus's link and increase its attack points and then uses Laundry Dragon's effect to make the battle damage 0 while banishing Heatleo. However Soulburner activates the effect of Salmangreat Zebroid X to Special Summon itself and Jack Jaguar to the field. He then uses his two monsters to Xyz Summon Salmangreat Blaze Dragon. Soulburner attacks with his new monster while equipping it with Salmangreat Tail to increase its attack points even further while gaining life points as well. However Roboppy is able to survive the attack. Roboppy activates Appliancer Test and Special Summons Vacculphant and Propelion. He then uses both of them to Link Summon Appliancer Laundry Dragon and Dryer Drake. Roboppy attacks Blaze Dragon with Laundry Dragon but Soulburner activates Salamangreat Ring to negate the attack and increase Blaze Dragon's attack by 500. Roboppy attempts to attack with Dryer Drake but Soulburner uses Blaze Dragon to Recarnation Xyz Summon it again while using its effect to destroy Laundry Dragon. However this fails as Roboppy use a spell card in his graveyard to Special Summon his Laundry Dragon when it is destroyed. Roboppy uses his monsters to attack and destroy Blaze Dragon then activates Dryer Drake's co-linked effect to switch places with Laundry Dragon allowing it to attack again. However Roboppy suddenly ends his turn and collapses, reverting to his robot form. Ai watching this notes that Roboppy's AI couldn't handle the program he gave him. Roboppy wakes up but has no idea where he is except for a desire to go back and clean Yusaku's room. Playmaker unable to see Roboppy like this tells Soulburner to finish the duel. Soulburner activates the spell card Rising fire to Special Summon Salamangreat Heatleo and destroys Dryer Drake thus winning the duel and erasing Roboppy. Both Playmaker and Soulburner are sad about Roboppy's defeat but suddenly Soulburner receives data in the shape of a letter addressed to Playmaker.
115	12	"Unfinished Business" / "Where It All Began"; Transliteration: "Hajimari no Basho" (Japanese: 始まりの場所)	Mitsutaka Hirota	August 21, 2019	September 6, 2021
Varis appears before Soulburner and Playmaker and demands that he give the letter to him. Soulburner refuses as he wants to give to Playmaker. Varis points out that Playmaker might spare Ai due to being his partner. Annoyed that Varis is still treating them like enemies and remembering that they didn't finish their previous duel, Soulburner suggests a rematch to decide who gets the letter. Soulburner tells Varis to not let him win like before. Varis responds that the reason he threw their last duel was because defeating both Lightning and Bohman was more important. With no reason to team up again, Varis assures him that he will take the duel seriously. Raising his hand Varis changes the island they are on to the area where the Lost Incident took place calling it the perfect place to settle things. Though Playmaker is worried for Soulburner, he convinces him to let him duel as he won't be to move on until he settles things with Varis. Soulburner begins the duel by Link Summoning Salmangreat Heatleo and setting a card face down which is exactly how their previous duel began. Varis summons Quadborrel Dragon and uses its effect to destroy Heatleo while Link Summoning Borreload Dragon afterwards. Varis attempts to end the duel in a single turn by attacking with both Borreload and Quadborrel but Soulburner is able to save himself by using his facedown card Salamangreat Gazer to lower Borreload's attack points by 1000 for each link marker Heatleo has thus reducing the damage to zero. As Soulburner begins his turn he knows that Varis saved him and the other victims of the Lost Incident and feels conflicted by his father but Soulburner has lost so much because of it as well. Soulburner Xyz Summons Salamangreat Miragestallio and through multiple Link Summons manages to revive Heatleo. Soulburner attempts to use Heatleo's effect to destroy a monster on Varis's field but the latter is able to negate this. Activating Fusion of Fire Soulburner fuses Heatleo and Wolfie in his hand to Fusion Summon Salamangreat Violent Chimera. Soulburner raises the attack points of Violent Chimera to 8600 and manages to destroy Borreload but Varis is able to reduce the damage he takes leaving him with 800 Life Points.
116	13	"Stuck in the Past" / "Complete Combustion"; Transliteration: "Kanzen Nenshō" (Japanese: 完全燃焼)	Mitsutaka Hirota	August 28, 2019	September 7, 2021
As the duel between Soulburner and Varis continues, Varis regains the upper hand by summoning a new link monster, Topologic Zeroboros. Varis insults Soulburner claiming that he can't do anything without his Ignis to guide him and that he'll remain trapped in the Lost Incident forever. Soulburner responds that prior to being kidnapped he got into a fight with his parents but can't seem to remember what they were arguing about. Soulburner demands to know how can he apologize to his parents if they are dead. Varis explains that just because someone died doesn't mean that they are gone and Soulburner doesn't need to apologize to his parents. Flame briefly appears within Soulburner's duel disk and encourages him to move forward, assuring him that he and his parents will always be with him in his heart. Soulburner launches a counterattack against Varis and manages to defeat him. Varis congratulates Soulburner upon his victory. Hearing this causes Soulburner to remember what Flame told him before that Varis wanted to apologize to him.
117	14	"Forced Hand" / "Parallel Paths"; Transliteration: "Majiwaranai Michi" (Japanese: 交わらない道)	Shin Yoshida	September 4, 2019	September 8, 2021
With the Duel over, Soulburner realizes that Varis didn't care about getting the letter and was trying to help him overcome his trauma. Varis denies this claiming that he was fighting for himself. Varis walks away intending to turn himself in to atone for his actions. However Soulburner stops him and asks him to atone by watching over the network instead. Soulburner explains that eventually everyone including him will forget about the Lost Incident and wants Varis to remember it to atone for what he's done. Varis accepts Soulburner's terms and leaves. Soulburner gives the letter to Playmaker leaving the rest up to him. After analyzing the letter Yusaku heads to Ai's location. As he walks there a card is thrown to him by Ryoken. The two bid each other farewell calling each other by their real names for the first time. Entering the SOL Tech factory Ai greets Yusaku. Ai leads him to the area where the SOLtis are being produced and reveals that he is making copies of himself. Ai explains that the copies will have free will and over time will develop their own personalities though Ai admits that he has no idea what they will do. Yusaku demands that Ai free everyone he defeated but Ai states that he can't unless he loses in a duel and adds that his copies won't stop be created as well. Yusaku accuses him of acting like Lightning though Ai replies he isn't as extreme as him. Ai responds that he doesn't plan on destroying humanity and only wants to give AIs a chance to survive. With no options left Yusaku and Ai begin their first and final duel with each other. As the duel begins Playmaker believes that Ai was responsible for giving him his Cyberse deck. Ai denies this stating that he was being chased by the Hanoi for five years. However Playmaker mentions that Ai was subtly influencing his life when he was on the run and was even responsible for him meeting and teaming up with Kolter. Ai admits that he set everything up so that Playmaker would protect him and defeat the Hanoi but he also admits that Playmaker is the only friend he has left.
118	15	"Alone Together" / "Reckless Proposal"; Transliteration: "Mubō na Teian" (Japanese: 無謀な提案)	Shin Yoshida	September 11, 2019	September 9, 2021
Playmaker questions Ai's reasons for making copies of himself. Ai responds that he created them to cope with his loneliness and the fact that he wasn't able to save his friends. Playmaker tells not to blame himself as nothing could be done. Ai replies he knows this and mentions he understands how Yusaku felt alone during the Lost Incident. Ai admits Varis was right about giving free will to AIs. Ai mentions that this Duel will decide his fate and whether the copies will be made or not. Playmaker responds even he makes copies of himself they won't be his friends and his loneliness won't disappear. Ai reveals that his free will will be spread across his copies and regardless of who wins the Duel he will cease to exist. Continuing the Duel Ai assembles all of his @Ignister monsters and uses them to Link Summon a Link 6 monster The Arrival Cyberse @Ignister. Ai states The Arrival gains 1000 ATK for every Link Monster used to summon it, therefore gaining 6000 attack points. Its effect places a counter on itself. Ai adds it gains 1000 attack points for every card on his field and with four cards on his field The Arrival gains 4000 attack points for a total of 10000. The Arrival's effect activates destroying a card and allowing Ai to summon a token to the field. Ai uses the token to Link Summon Darkwight @Ignister with its effect preventing it from being targeted for an attack while it's linked to another monster. With another monster on the field The Arrival now has 11000 ATK. Playmaker begins his turn by bringing out Firewall Exceed Dragon and Cyberse Quantum Dragon. Playmaker attacks with Quantum Dragon and activates its effect to return The Arrival back to Ai's hand. However Ai activates Arrival's effect to negate the effect of Quantum Dragon when it has a counter placed on it and counterattacks.
119	16	"A Losing Battle" / "A Broken Ego"; Transliteration: "Kowareyuku Jiga" (Japanese: 壊れゆく自我)	Shin Yoshida	September 18, 2019	September 10, 2021
Playmaker survives the attack by activating Linkslayer's effect to reduce the battle damage to zero when its linked to another monster. Cyberse Quantum Dragon is destroyed and Darkwight's effect activates dealing 500 point of damage when a monster on his opponent's field is destroyed. Remembering Yusaku asked what happened to him Ai decides to reveal the truth. Back in Cyberse World Ai enters Lightning's cave and discovered a message left behind by him. A copy of Lightning appears and shows Ai a simulation of what would happen if he was the only surviving Ignis. The simulation showed Den City completely in ruins. Ai mentions that if any other Ignis besides him or Lightning were to survive, this event wouldn't happen. Playmaker believes that Lightning created that simulation just to hurt him. Ai acknowledges this and mentions he made several of his own simulations. But no matter what decision he makes, the results remained the same: with the world being destroyed. Ai came to the conclusion that he really is the problem and fears he will turn out like Bohman and Lightning if he continues to live on. Continuing the Duel Ai activates The Arrival's effect to destroy Linkslayer on Playmaker's field to Special Summon a token but the latter activates Cyberse Synchron's effect to banish itself from the graveyard and negate The Arrival's effect. Ai decides to attack Firewall Exceed Dragon and destroys it though Playmaker takes no damage due to Linkslayer's effect. Playmaker uses Linkslayer to Link Summon Linkross and its effect Special Summons two link tokens. Playmaker then summons Metal Molephosis and activates its effect to change the tokens to DARK attribute and dragon types and fuses them into Borreload Furious Dragon. Ai realizes that Varis gave him that card. Playmaker also Link Summons Firewall Dragon Darkfluid and its effect activates gain four counters for each monster used to summon it and 2500 ATK per counter gaining 13000 attack points. Playmaker attacks with Darkfluid but Ai activates The Arrival's effect removing a counter on it to negate Darkfluid's effect. Playmaker then uses Borreload Furious Dragon's effect to destroy a card on his and Ai's field choosing Borreload and Ai's Judgement Arrow's card. With less cards on his field The Arrival's attack points decrease to the point where Darkfluid can destroy it. However Ai activates the effect of Wind Pegasus in his graveyard to banish Darkfluid, however Playmaker activates its effect to remove a counter on Darkfluid to negate Wind Pegasus's effect. Darkfluid attacks twice lowering Ai's life points. Ai tricks Playmaker into using two of Darkfluid's counters and lower its attack points making it weaker than The Arrival. Ai special summons Gatchiri @Ignister and sets a card increasing The Arrival's ATK to 13000. Ai attacks Darkfluid and destroys it though Playmaker is able to reduce the damage he takes. After successfully destroying Darkfluid, Ai Special Summons Gussari @Ignister to the field and increases The Arrival's attack points even further. Ai extends an offer to Playmaker asking him to merge with him and become one being.
120	17	"Journey's End" / "Connected World"; Transliteration: "Tsunagaru Sekai" (Japanese: 繋がる世界)	Shin Yoshida	September 25, 2019	September 13, 2021
Playmaker rejects Ai's offer pointing out that merging together isn't the answer and won't help ease Ai's pain. As Playmaker notes with nothing in his hand or field the card he draws will decide everything. As he draws Ai activates the trap A.I.Q limiting both players to one Link Summon on this turn. Through multiple monster summons Playmaker is able to Link Summon Accesscode Talker, a Link 4 monster. Activating Accesscode Talker's effect to banish a card in his graveyard to destroy a card on his opponent's field, Playmaker is able to wipe out all the cards on Ai's field except for The Arrival Cyberse @Ignister. With no other cards on Ai's field The Arrival's attack points are low enough for it to be destroyed. However Ai activates the effect of Gussari @Ignister in his graveyard, banishing it to change the attack points of both monsters on the field to 3000 causing both The Arrival and Accesscode Talker to take each other out. Gussari's other effect activates allowing Ai to Special Summon a Link Monster with fewer attack points than the one that was destroyed. Ai chooses Dark Templar @Ignister while Playmaker counters this by activing Cynet Closure's effect to return Recoded Alive from his deck to the graveyard and banishes it to Special Summon Decode Talker. Ai attacks with Dark Templar and activates TAi Strike to defeat Playmaker but the latter removes the trap Code Hack from his graveyard to negate the effect of TAi Strike and increase the ATK of Decode Talker by 700 thus winning the duel. Playmaker states that he would have won if he didn't activate TAi Strike which Ai admits that he knew Playmaker was up to something when he summon Decode Talker. Ai reveals in one of the simulations he made Yusaku died protecting him. Raising his hand Ai releases the conscious data of everyone he defeated. Ai's body begins to glow and he realizes he's about to vanish. Remembering how Yusaku named him Ai asks him what his name means. Playmaker tearfully replies that Ai means to love people. Accepting this Ai passes away telling Playmaker his last words: I love you. Waking up in the real world Yusaku cradles Ai's empty SOLtis body mourning the loss of his friend and partner. Three months later peace has returned. Skye visits Cal, who is spending time with Jin, Akira has now become the CEO of SOL Technologies, Ghost Gal and The Shepard are working together, The Gore is back as a celebrity duelist, Theodore returns to his hometown and enters LINK VRAINS with Kiku by his side and the Knights of Hanoi are now protecting the network to atone for their crimes. Yusaku is mentioned by many to be on a journey though everyone has faith that he will return someday. Meanwhile, somewhere in the network, a digital eyeball resembling Ai was formed and looked around in confusion.
