= Yu-Gi-Oh! Go Rush!! season 1 =

Yu-Gi-Oh! Go Rush!!
- Season 1
- The cover of the first Blu-ray compilation, featuring Yudias Velgear (human form top left and alien form top right), Yuamu Ohdo (bottom left) and Yuhi Ohdo (bottom right).
- No. of episodes: 51

Release
- Original network: TV Tokyo
- Original release: April 3, 2022 – March 26, 2023

Season chronology
- ← Previous; Yu-Gi-Oh! Sevens season 2 Next → season 2

Yu-Gi-Oh! Go Rush!! is the seventh spin-off anime series in the Yu-Gi-Oh! franchise and the eleventh anime series overall. It is produced by Bridge and broadcast on TV Tokyo. The series is directed by Nobuhiro Kondo. Toshimitsu Takeuchi is in charge of series' scripts, and Kazuko Tadano and Hiromi Matsushita are designing the characters. This season follows Yudias, Yuhi and Yuamu as they face off against Zuwijo Zwil Velgear, Yudias' commander, who is seeking to use Rush Duels to forcibly end the war in their homeworld.

An edited English-language dub premiered in the United States on Disney XD on January 11, 2025.

This season uses two theme songs. From episodes 1 to 51, the opening theme is "Shinkirō" (蜃気楼) (Mirage) by Frederic while the ending theme is "One Way" by Yūsuke Saeki.

== Episode list ==
No.	English dub title / Japanese translated title	Directed by	Written by	Storyboarded by	Original release date (Note: The series premiered on TV Tokyo on April 3 at 7:30 a.m. JST.)	American air date
1	"Meet the Ultraterrestrial Tracker Squad" / "This Is Ultraterrestrial Trouble Solutions!"; Transliteration: "Kochira Uchūjin Toraburu Sōdansha!" (Japanese: こちら宇宙人トラブル相談所!)	Masato Miyoshi	Toshimitsu Takeuchi	TBA	April 3, 2022	January 11, 2025
2	"The Secrecy" / "The Organization for Monitoring Interstellar Kriminals"; Transliteration: "Meiwaku Iseijin Kanshi Kikō" (Japanese: 迷惑異星人監視機構)	Shinya Sasaki	Toshimitsu Takeuchi	TBA	April 10, 2022	January 18, 2025
3	"The Kebobbery!" / "Be Afraid? The Blood-Sucking Alien"; Transliteration: "Kyōfu? Kyūketsu Uchūjin" (Japanese: 恐怖？吸血宇宙人)	Tomoya Takayama	Higuchi Tatsuto	TBA	April 17, 2022	January 25, 2025
4	"Trap Tutorial" / "The Chupacabra's Trap"; Transliteration: "Chupakabura no Wana" (Japanese: チュパカブラの罠)	Shinichi Fukumoto	Hiroshi Yamaguchi	TBA	April 24, 2022	February 1, 2025
5	"All Washed Up!" / "I'm Tell Kawai, and I'm Thirsty"; Transliteration: "Kawai Teru nda Yo" (Japanese: カワイテルンダヨ)	Yuto Nakamura	Yuichi Nomura	TBA	May 1, 2022	February 8, 2025
6	"Three Terrifying Tales" / "Whether You Believe It or Not Is Your Problem"; Transliteration: "Shinjiru ka Shinjinai ka wa Omae no Mondai" (Japanese: 信じるか信じないかはお前の問題)	Yuzo Sasaki	Kazuho Hyodo	TBA	May 8, 2022	February 15, 2025
7	"Training Troubles" / "Can You Name All the Monster Types?"; Transliteration: "Monsutā Shuzoku Ieru ka na?" (Japanese: モンスター種族言えるかな?)	Yuki Shiina	Aya Matsui	Kondo Nobuhiro	May 15, 2022	February 22, 2025
8	"Showdown with a Star!" / "Good Manya-rning from TV Land"; Transliteration: "Terebi no Kuni kara Manyanya Chiwa" (Japanese: テレビの国からマニャニャちわ)	Nao Yamada	Hiroshi Yamaguchi	Furuta Jouji	May 22, 2022	March 1, 2025
9	"Doggy Duel!" / "Bochi of the Graveyard"; Transliteration: "Hakaba no Bochi" (Japanese: 墓場ぼボチ)	Ryuta Yamamoto	Higuchi Tatsuto	Yamamoto Ryuta	May 29, 2022	March 8, 2025
10	"Earthdama Drama" / "Magical Sheep Girl Meeeg-chan"; Transliteration: "Mahō Yōjo Meegu-chan" (Japanese: 魔法羊女メェ～グちゃん)	Yasumi Mikamoto	Yuichi Nomura	Yamada Hiroyuki	June 5, 2022	March 15, 2025
11	"Testing Time!" / "Where's Zuwijo?"; Transliteration: "Zuwījou o Sagase!" (Japanese: ズウィージョウを捜せ！)	Takayama Tomoya	Yamaguchi Hiroshi	Mori Takeshi	June 12, 2022	March 22, 2025
12	"The Grand Plan" / "Earthdama"; Transliteration: "Āsudamā" (Japanese: アースダマー)	Fukumoto Shinichi	Takeuchi Toshimitsu	Hashimoto Naoto	June 19, 2022	March 29, 2025
13	"Wrath of the Requiem" / "Requiem of Fiction"; Transliteration: "Kyokō no Rekuiemu" (Japanese: 虚構のレクイエム)	Mizuno Kentaro	Takeuchi Toshimitsu	Komoto Shogo	June 26, 2022	April 5, 2025
14	"The Next Case" / "Client: London"; Transliteration: "Irainin Rondon" (Japanese: 依頼人ロンドン)	Sasaki Shinya	Hyodo Kazuho	Fujiwara Ryouji	July 3, 2022	April 12, 2025
15	"The Alien Underground" / "The Devil Wears Jersey"; Transliteration: "Jāji o Kita Akuma" (Japanese: ジャージを着た悪魔 –)	Sasaki Yuzo	Matsui Aya	Kondo Nobuhiro	July 10, 2022	April 19, 2025
Note: This episode is dedicated to Kazuki Takahashi who died on July 4, 2022.
16	"Sky Sky Sky" / "Duel Ghost"; Transliteration: "Dyueru no Bōrei" (Japanese: デュエルの亡霊)	Nakamura Yuto	Higuchi Tatsuto	Mori Takeshi	July 17, 2022	April 26, 2025
17	"The Info Broker" / Information, De-Sky? Transliteration: "Jōhō de Sukai?" (Japanese: 情報デスカイ?)	Komai Katsuyuki	Nomura Yuichi	Yamada Hiroyuki	July 24, 2022	May 3, 2025
18	"Eye See All" / The Great Prophecy of Nomurandamas; Transliteration: "Nomuratodamasu no Daiyogen" (Japanese: ノムラトダマスの大予言)	Watanabe Sumio	Yamaguchi Hiroshi	Furuta Jouji	July 31, 2022	May 10, 2025
19	"The Big Boss" / The Power of Cuteness? Transliteration: "Kawaii no Chikara?" (Japanese: カワイイの力?)	Takayama Tomoya	Hyodo Kazuho	Takayama Tomoya	August 7, 2022	May 17, 2025
20	"The Rovian Bandit" / Yuna Goha; Transliteration: "Gōha Yūna" (Japanese: ゴーハ・ユウナ)	Shiina Yuuki	Takeuchi Toshimitsu	Komoto Shogo	August 14, 2022	May 24, 2025
21	"Mission: Find Yudias" / Intruders Breaking the Ru-ru-ru-ru-rules; Transliteration: "Shinnyūsha Rūru Yabutterururururu" (Japanese: 侵入者ルール破ってルルルルル)	Miyoshi Masato	Higuchi Tatsuto	Kondo Nobuhiro	August 21, 2022	May 31, 2025
22	"The Queen of Powloon Castle"; Transliteration: "Pāronjō no Joō" (Japanese: パーロン城の女王)	Fukumoto Shinichi	Higuchi Tatsuto	Hashimoto Naoto	August 28, 2022	June 7, 2025
23	"Ramen Rumble" / Hanako the Naruto; Transliteration: "Naruto no Hanako" (Japanese: ナルトの華子)	Unknown	Matsui Aya	TBA	September 4, 2022	June 14, 2025
24	"My Friend Got Turned into a T-Shirt" / Be Revived! Yudias; Transliteration: "Yomigaere! Yuudiasu" (Japanese: よみがえれ！ユウディアス)	Mizuno Kentaro	Yamaguchi Hiroshi	Mori Takeshi	September 11, 2022	June 21, 2025
25	"The Takeover" / UTS Under Attack; Transliteration: "Nerawareta Yū Tī Esu" (Japanese: 狙われたUTS)	Mikamoto Yasumi	Takeuchi Toshimitsu	Komoto Shogo	September 18, 2022	June 28, 2025
26	"Secret of the Space Treasure" / Fly! Rush Duel; Transliteration: "Tobe! Rasshu Dyueru" (Japanese: 翔べ！ラッシュデュエル)	Komai Katsuyuki	Takeuchi Toshimitsu	Kondo Nobuhiro	September 25, 2022	July 5, 2025
27	"How to Make a Cartoon" / It's Tough Making an Anime; Transliteration: "Anime wa Tsurai yo" (Japanese: アニメはつらいよ)	Yuzo Sasaki	Yuichi Nomura	Hashimoto Naoto	October 2, 2022	July 12, 2025
28	"Old School Duel" / Fight! UTS Eight; Transliteration: "Tatakae! Yū Tī Esu Eito" (Japanese: 闘え！UTSエイト)	Unknown	Higuchi Tatsuto	TBA	October 9, 2022	July 19, 2025
29	"Rubble Trouble" / Rocka-Dabba-Doo! Transliteration: "Ishidabadū!" (Japanese: イシダバドゥー！)	Unknown	Unknown	TBA	October 16, 2022	July 26, 2025
30	"The Redeem Queen" / Festival Queen; Transliteration: "Fesutibaru Kuīn" (Japanese: フェスティバルクイーン)	Unknown	Yamada Kenichi	TBA	October 23, 2022	August 2, 2025
31	"Remote Rush Duel"; Transliteration: "Rimōto Rasshu Dyueru" (Japanese: リモートラッシュデュエル)	Unknown	Matsui Aya	TBA	October 30, 2022	August 9, 2025
32	"The Great King of Terror" / Invasion! The Great King of Terror; Transliteration: "Shūrai! Kyōfu no Daiō" (Japanese: 襲来！恐怖の大王)	Unknown	Ueno Kimiko	TBA	November 6, 2022	October 4, 2025
33	"Jurassic Plastic" / Plastic World; Transliteration: "Purachikku Wārudo" (Japanese: プラチック・ワールド)	Takayama Tomoya	Yamaguchi Hiroshi	Takayama Tomoya	November 13, 2022	October 11, 2025
34	"Are You Kitten' Me?" / The☆Nyandestar; Transliteration: "Za ☆ Nyande Sutā" (Japanese: ザ☆ニャンデスター)	Mikamoto Yasumi	Nomura Yuichi	Mori Takeshi	November 20, 2022	October 18, 2025
35	"Learning About London" / London, Lies, and Cassette Tape; Transliteration: "Rondon to Uso to Kasettotēpu" (Japanese: ロンドンと嘘とカセットテープ)	Mizuno Kentaro	Higuchi Tatsuto	Komoto Shogo	November 27, 2022	October 25, 2025
36	"To Freeze or Not To Freeze" / Feelings I Want to Convey, Yei! Transliteration: "Todoketai Omoi Iei!" (Japanese: 届けたい想いイェイ！)	Song Shenda	Yamaguchi Hiroshi	Hashimoto Naoto	December 4, 2022	November 1, 2025
37	"The Zuwijo" / Zuwijo the Dark; Transliteration: "Ankoku no Zuījō" (Japanese: 暗黒のズウィージョウ)	Song Shenda	Yamaguchi Hiroshi	Yamada Hiroyuki	December 11, 2022	November 8, 2025
38	"A Cool Duel" / The☆Luug! The☆Luug! Transliteration: "Za☆Rūgu Za☆Rūgu" (Japanese: ザ☆ルーグ・ザ☆ルーグ)	Watanabe Sumio	Takeuchi Toshimitsu	Kondo Nobuhiro	December 18, 2022	November 15, 2025
39	"Who's That Guy?" / That Guy from the Future; Transliteration: "Mirai Kara Kita Aitsu" (Japanese: 未来からきたアイツ)	Sasaki Yuzo	Takeuchi Toshimitsu	Takayama Tomoya	December 25, 2022	November 22, 2025
40	"Summoning Spectacle" / Chant Improvement Dojo; Transliteration: "Kōjō Kōjō Dōjō" (Japanese: 口上向上道場)	Fukumoto Shinichi	Matsui Aya	Watanabe Shinichi	January 8, 2023	November 29, 2025
41	"Planet Meowmeowmeow" / The Miracle on Planet Pawtner; Transliteration: "Nyakayoshi-sei no Kiseki" (Japanese: ニャカヨシ星の奇跡)	Komai Katsuyuki	Ueno Kimiko	Kondo Nobuhiro	January 15, 2023	December 6, 2025
42	"The Courier" / Shewbahha the Courier; Transliteration: "Hakobiya Shūbahha" (Japanese: 運び屋シューバッハ)	Mikamoto Yasumi	Yamada Kenichi	Hashimoto Naoto	January 22, 2023	December 13, 2025
43	"Hearing Whispers" / Is It Okay if I Whisper to You? Transliteration: "Sasayaitemo Ī no Kai?" (Japanese: ささやいてもいいのかい)	Mizuno Kentaro	Nomura Yuichi	Kondo Nobuhiro	January 29, 2023	December 20, 2025
44	"Operation Yudias" / Break Through the Encirclement! Transliteration: "Hōimō o Toppa Seyo!" (Japanese: 包囲網を突破せよ！)	Isowa Yuri	Higuchi Tatsuto	Miyoshi Masato	February 5, 2023	December 27, 2025
45	"Decisions, Decisions" / A Fateful Choice; Transliteration: "Unmei no Sentaku" (Japanese: 運命の選択)	Takayama Tomoya	Higuchi Tatsuto	Takayama Tomoya	February 12, 2023	January 3, 2026
46	"Who is the Earthdama?" / The Invaders from Planet Earth; Transliteration: "Chikyū Kara no Shinryakusha" (Japanese: 地球からの侵略者)	Watanabe Sumio	Yamaguchi Hiroshi	Umino Namako	February 19, 2023	January 10, 2026
47	"Dueling with Efficiency" / I'm Damamu! Transliteration: "Boku-chin Damamū!" (Japanese: ボクちんダマムー！)	Komai Katsuyuki	Ueno Kimiko	Kondo Nobuhiro	February 26, 2023	January 17, 2026
48	"Playtime with Damamu" / A Close Call on Planet Velgear; Transliteration: "Berugyā-sei Kikiippatsu" (Japanese: ベルギャー星危機一髪)	Fukumoto Shinichi	Hyodo Kazuho	Watanabe Shinichi	March 5, 2023	January 24, 2026
49	"Rush to War" / Yudias vs. Zuwijo; Transliteration: "Yuudiasu tai Zuwījou" (Japanese: ユウディアス対ズウィージョウ)	Mikamoto Yasumi	Takeuchi Toshimitsu	Tsuchiya Akira	March 12, 2023	January 31, 2026
50	"Rush to Retaliate" / Battleship Rush Duel; Transliteration: "Senkan Rasshu Dyueru!" (Japanese: 戦艦ラッシュデュエル！)	Tomoya Takayama; Yuzo Sasaki	Takeuchi Toshimitsu	TBA	March 19, 2023	February 7, 2026
51	"Rush to Redemption" / Karutumata; Transliteration: "Karutumāta" (Japanese: カルトゥマータ)	Komai Katsuyuki	Takeuchi Toshimitsu	Hashimoto Naoto	March 26, 2023	February 14, 2026

== Home media ==
=== Japanese ===
Marvelous co., ltd. (Japan, Region 2/A)
Volume	Episodes	Release date	Ref.
1	1–13	October 26, 2022	
2	14–26	January 25, 2023	
3	27–39	April 26, 2023	
4	40–51	July 26, 2023	
