= Yu-Gi-Oh! Sevens season 1 =

Yu-Gi-Oh! Sevens
- Season 1
- The cover of the first Blu-ray compilation, featuring Yuga Ohdo (left) and Tatsuhisa "Luke" Kamijō (right).
- No. of episodes: 52

Release
- Original network: TV Tokyo
- Original release: April 4, 2020 – June 13, 2021

Season chronology
- ← Previous; Yu-Gi-Oh! VRAINS; Season 3 Next → Season 2

Yu-Gi-Oh! Sevens is the sixth spin-off anime series in the Yu-Gi-Oh! franchise and the tenth anime series overall. It is produced by Bridge and broadcast on TV Tokyo. The series is directed by Nobuhiro Kondo. The series follows Yūga and his friends as they show off the delights of Rush Duels while under the watchful eye of the Goha Corporation that oversees the city. On April 28, 2020, it was announced that after episode 5, the remaining episodes would be delayed for five weeks due to the effects of the COVID-19 pandemic. On July 10, 2020, it was announced it will be delayed again due to the aforementioned pandemic and will resume on August 8, 2020. Starting April 4, 2021, it aired on Sunday at 7:30 AM JST.

An edited English dub began production in early 2021, and premiered on Disney XD on June 6, 2022, and on Hulu on June 7, 2022, in the United States.

The first opening theme is "Nanananananana" (ナナナナナナナ), performed by Yusuke Saeki while the first ending theme is "Goha #7 Elementary School Song" (ゴーハ第7小学校校歌, Goha Dai 7 Shou Gakkou Kouku), performed by Hiiro Ishibashi, Taku Yashiro, and Natsuki Hanae.

== Episode list ==
No.	English dub title / Japanese translated title	Directed by	Written by	Original release date	American air date (Note: For simplicity purposes on the episode table, the English air dates only reflect the televised broadcast on Disney XD in the United States. Some episodes might be streamed in advance on Hulu.)
1	"Ready for the Rush!" / "Let's Do This! Rush Duel!"; Transliteration: "Iku zo! Rasshu Dyueru!" (Japanese: いくぞ！ラッシュデュエル！)	Naoto Hashimoto	Toshimitsu Takeuchi	April 4, 2020	June 6, 2022
2	"The Future King of Duels" / "The Man Who Possesses Evil"; Transliteration: "Akuma o Kau Otoko" (Japanese: 悪魔を飼う男)	Junto Sasaki	Toshimitsu Takeuchi	April 11, 2020	June 6, 2022
3	"Rock the Rush Duel" / "Romin's Secret"; Transliteration: "Romin no Himitsu" (Japanese: ロミンの秘密)	Imazaki Itsuki	Ayumu Hisao	April 18, 2020	June 7, 2022
4	"Rush Duel Resignation" / "Goodbye, Student Council President!"; Transliteration: "Sayonara, Seitokaichō!" (Japanese: さよなら、生徒会長！)	Shuichi Kato	Masahiro Yokotani	April 25, 2020	June 7, 2022
5	"Breaking News!" / "Rook, Fight of a Man"; Transliteration: "Rūku, Otoko no Tatakai" (Japanese: ルーク、男の闘い)	Yasumi Mikamoto	Hiroshi Yamaguchi	May 2, 2020	June 8, 2022
6	"Rushing for Ramen" / "Sorry for the Noodles! Ramen Duel!"; Transliteration: "Gomen! Rāmen Dyueru!" (Japanese: 御麺！ラーメンデュエル！)	Tomoya Takayama	Ueno Kimiko	June 13, 2020	June 8, 2022
7	"Disco Duel" / "The Transfer Student is a Grade-Schooler?"; Transliteration: "Tenkōsei wa Shōgakusei?" (Japanese: 転校生は小学生？転校生は小学生？)	Daiki Nishimura	Nomura Yuichi	June 20, 2020	June 9, 2022
8	"Rush Crushed Kid" / "Post-Apocalypse and Neapolitan Spaghetti"; Transliteration: "Seikimatsu to Naporitan" (Japanese: 世紀末とナポリタン世紀末とナポリタン)	Yuki Morita Shunichi Kato	Hisao Ayumu	June 27, 2020	June 9, 2022
9	"Dino Detours" / "Wonderful Jurassic"; Transliteration: "Suteki na Jurashikku" (Japanese: 素敵なジュラシック素敵なジュラシック)	Imazaki Itsuki	Nomura Yuichi	July 4, 2020	June 10, 2022
10	"Behind You!" / "A Horrifying Horror Duel"; Transliteration: "Kyōfu no Kaidan Dyueru" (Japanese: 恐怖の怪談デュエル恐怖の怪談デュエル)	Yuji Suzuki	Yokotani Masahiro	August 8, 2020	June 10, 2022
11	"Hungry for a Duel" / "No More Holding Back!"; Transliteration: "Gaman ga Genkai!" (Japanese: ガマンが限界！ガマンが限界！)	Tomoya Takayama	Ueno Kimiko	August 15, 2020	June 11, 2022
12	"Drawing a Foul" / "The Forbidden Ace"; Transliteration: "Kinjirareta Ēsu" (Japanese: 禁じられたエース禁じられたエース)	Naoto Hashimoto	Toshimitsu Takeuchi	August 22, 2020	June 18, 2022
13	"The Chosen One" / "Another King"; Transliteration: "Mō Hitori no Ō" (Japanese: もう一人の王もう一人の王)	Hiroshi Akiyama	Toshimitsu Takeuchi	August 29, 2020	June 25, 2022
14	"Curry Worries" / "Romin's Kitchen"; Transliteration: "Rominzu Kicchin" (Japanese: ロミン'sキッチン)	Imazaki Itsuki	Hiroshi Yamaguchi	September 5, 2020	July 2, 2022
15	"A Deep-Sea Duel" / "Setting Sail! Goha Fishing Elementary"; Transliteration: "Shussen! Gōha Suisanshō" (Japanese: 出船！ゴーハ水産小)	Yasumi Mikamoto	Ayumu Hisao	September 12, 2020	July 9, 2022
16	"Clean-Up Operation" / "The Man Who Washes Duels"; Transliteration: "Dyueru wo Arau Otoko" (Japanese: デュエルを洗う男デュエルを洗う男)	Shinichi Fukumoto	Yuichi Nomura	September 19, 2020	July 16, 2022
17	"Purr-plexed!" / "The Cat in the Garden of Providence"; Transliteration: "Setsuri no Niwa no Neko" (Japanese: セツリの庭のネコ)	Yuji Suzuki	Yamaguchi Hiroshi	September 26, 2020	July 23, 2022
18	"The Beat of Defeat" / "Sorry, Gett-A Chance"; Transliteration: "Gomen ne Getta Chansu" (Japanese: ごめんねゲッタチャンス)	Tomoya Takayama	Toshimitsu Takeuchi	October 3, 2020	July 30, 2022
19	"A Duel of Thrones" / "The One Who is a Throne"; Transliteration: "Gyokuza-taru Mono" (Japanese: 玉座たるもの)	Sueda Yoshifumi	Yuichi Nomura	October 10, 2020	August 6, 2022
20	"What Makes A Hero a Hero?" / "Being an Adult is Tough"; Transliteration: "Otona wa Tsurai yo" (Japanese: オトナはつらいよ)	Naoto Hashimoto	Ayumu Hisao	October 17, 2020	August 13, 2022
21	"A Taste of Space" / "Close Encounters of the Noodle Kind"; Transliteration: "Men to no Sōgū" (Japanese: 麺との遭遇)	Noriyuki Nakamura	Yamaguchi Hiroshi	October 24, 2020	August 20, 2022
22	"Cleaning Time!" / "The Sealed Devil"; Transliteration: "Fūjirareta Akuma" (Japanese: 封じられた悪魔)	Naoto Hashimoto	Hisao Ayumu	October 31, 2020	August 27, 2022
23	"I'm Curious" / "What Lies Beyond Providence"; Transliteration: "Setsuri no Saki ni Aru Mono" (Japanese: セツリの先にあるもの)	Masato Miyoshi	Nomura Yuichi	November 7, 2020	September 3, 2022
24	"Helping a Friend" / "Resolve"; Transliteration: "Kakugo" (Japanese: 覚悟)	Yasumi Mikamoto	Yamaguchi Hiroshi	November 14, 2020	September 10, 2022
25	"Maximum Mayhem" / "Dreams, Courage, and Friendship"; Transliteration: "Yume to Yūki to Yūjō" (Japanese: 夢と勇気と友情)	Tomoya Takayama	Takeuchi Toshimitsu	November 21, 2020	September 17, 2022
26	"The Final Nail" / "Maximum Duel!"; Transliteration: "Makishimamu Dyueru!" (Japanese: マキシマムデュエル！)	Masahiro Takada	Takeuchi Toshimitsu	November 28, 2020	September 24, 2022
27	"Luke Club" / "The Luke Club Is Born!"; Transliteration: "Rūku-bu Tanjō!" (Japanese: ルーク部誕生！)	Naoto Hashimoto	Matsui Aya	December 5, 2020	October 1, 2022
28	"Training Camp" / "Training Camp! Sushi Duel"; Transliteration: "Gasshuku! Osushi Dyueru" (Japanese: 合宿！お寿司デュエル)	Jiro Arimoto	Kimiko Ueno	December 12, 2020	October 8, 2022
29	"Heavy Duty Duel" / "Galient Digging"; Transliteration: "Gyarian Daichi wo Horu" (Japanese: ギャリアン大地を掘る)	Yuki Inaba	Nomura Yuichi	December 19, 2020	October 15, 2022
30	"Tiger's Breath" / "The Tiger Way of Battle"; Transliteration: "Tatakai no Kokyū" (Japanese: 闘いの虎吸)	Shinichi Fukumoto	Takeuchi Toshimitsu	December 26, 2020	October 22, 2022
31	"Draw Draw Draw!" / "Rebelli-Ant Is Mine"; Transliteration: "Hangyakusuru wa Ware ni Ari" (Japanese: 叛逆するは我にアリ)	Naoki Hishikawa	Yamaguchi Hiroshi	January 9, 2021	October 29, 2022
32	"Here Come the Cavalry" / "The Lady Who Loves Her Heavy Cavalry"; Transliteration: "Jūki Mezuru Himegimi" (Japanese: 重騎愛づる姫君)	Tomoya Takayama	Aya Matsui	January 16, 2021	November 5, 2022
33	"Construction Chaos" / "Goha #6 Elementary School"; Transliteration: "Gōha Dairoku Shōgakkō" (Japanese: ゴーハ第(だい)6小(しょう)学(がっ)校(こう))	Yasumi Mikamoto	Tatsuto Higuchi	January 23, 2021	November 12, 2022
34	"Pressure Points" / "The Shiatsu Nether-Empire Strikes Back"; Transliteration: "Shiatsu Teikoku no Gyakushū" (Japanese: 指圧底国の逆襲)	Yusuke Onoda	Kimiko Ueno	January 30, 2021	November 19, 2022
35	"Demolition Duel" / "Sound! Gohanium"; Transliteration: "Hibike! Gōhaniumu" (Japanese: 響け！ゴーハニウム)	Sueda Yoshifumi	Yamaguchi Hiroshi	February 6, 2021	November 26, 2022
36	"Sibling Showdown" / "Enlightenment ♡ Ranze Eyes"; Transliteration: "Kaigan ♡ Ranze Aizu" (Japanese: 開眼♡らんぜアイズ)	Nana Imanaka	Nomura Yuichi	February 13, 2021	December 3, 2022
37	"CooCoo Duel" / "Coo-Coo-Luke-Coo"; Transliteration: "Kurukkurūku" (Japanese: クルックルーク)	Noriyuki Nakamura	Matsui Aya	February 20, 2021	December 10, 2022
38	"Maximum Risk" / "Unearth the Maximum!"; Transliteration: "Makishimamu wo Horiokose!" (Japanese: マキシマムを掘り起こせ！)	Naoto Hashimoto	Takeuchi Toshimitsu	February 27, 2021	December 17, 2022
39	"Breaking Tradition" / "Reclaim Mutsuba's Pride"; Transliteration: "Torimodose! Mutsuba no Hokori!" (Japanese: 取り戻せ！ムツバの誇り！)	Tomoya Takayama	Takeuchi Toshimitsu	March 6, 2021	December 24, 2022
40	"I Quit" / "Give Me Jam ♪"; Transliteration: "Gibu Mī Jamu ♪" (Japanese: ギブ・ミー・ジャム♪)	Masahiko Watanabe	Tatsuto Higuchi	March 13, 2021	December 31, 2022
41	"Student Council Crisis" / "I'll Yameruler the Sogetsu Style"; Transliteration: "Sōgetsu-ryū Yamerūra" (Japanese: 蒼月流ヤメルーラ)	Shinichi Fukumoto	Ueno Kimiko	March 20, 2021	January 7, 2023
42	"All About Space" / "Space Operations Duel Squadron"; Transliteration: "Uchū Sakusen Dyueru-tai" (Japanese: 宇宙作戦デュエル隊)	Yasumi Mikamoto	Yamaguchi Hiroshi	April 4, 2021	January 14, 2023
43	"Change of Plans" / "Opening! Team Battle Royal"; Transliteration: "Kaimaku! Chīmu Batoru Roiyaru" (Japanese: 開幕！チームバトルロイヤル)	Naoki Hishikawa	Yuichi Nomura	April 11, 2021	January 21, 2023
44	"The Battle Royal Begins" / "Dissonance"; Transliteration: "Fukyōwaon" (Japanese: 不協和音)	Sumio Watanabe	Matsui Aya	April 18, 2021	January 21, 2023
45	"Treasure Trackers" / "Upstart Hunter"; Transliteration: "Narikin Hantā" (Japanese: 成金ハンター)	Kazusa	Higuchi Tatsuto	April 25, 2021	January 28, 2023
46	"Meats vs. Sweets" / "Back to the Past"; Transliteration: "Bakku tu za Kako" (Japanese: バック・トゥ・ザ・過去)	Nao Yamada	Yamaguchi Hiroshi	May 2, 2021	February 4, 2023
47	"Bad Business" / "Employee's Counterattack"; Transliteration: "Gyakushū no Shain" (Japanese: 逆襲のシャイン)	Masahiko Watanabe	Yuichi Nomura	May 9, 2021	February 11, 2023
48	"Once Were Friends" / "Clash of Secret Techniques"; Transliteration: "Ōgi Gekitotsu" (Japanese: 奥義激突)	Naoto Hashimoto	Aya Matsui	May 16, 2021	February 18, 2023
49	"Battle of the Band" / "RoaRomin"; Transliteration: "Roaromin" (Japanese: ロアロミン)	Noriyuki Nakamura	Yamaguchi Hiroshi	May 23, 2021	February 25, 2023
50	"DJ G!" / "Gakuting"; Transliteration: "Gakutingu" (Japanese: ガクティング)	Yasumi Mikamoto	Ueno Kimiko	May 30, 2021	March 4, 2023
51	"Battle Royal Revelation" / "Road vs Daor"; Transliteration: "Rōdo Bāsasu Dōro" (Japanese: ロードvsドーロ)	Tomoya Takayama	Toshimitsu Takeuchi	June 6, 2021	March 11, 2023
52	"Battle Royal Finale" / "The Last Rush Duel"; Transliteration: "Saigo no Rasshu Dyueru" (Japanese: 最後のラッシュデュエル)	Naoki Hishikawa	Toshimitsu Takeuchi	June 13, 2021	March 18, 2023

== Home media release ==
=== Japanese ===
Marvelous co., ltd. (Japan, Region 2/A)
Volume	Episodes	Release date	Ref.
Duel 1	1–13	October 28, 2020	
Duel 2	14–26	January 27, 2021	
Duel 3	27–39	May 26, 2021	
Duel 4	40–52	August 25, 2021	
