= List of Yu-Gi-Oh! Go Rush!! episodes =

Yu-Gi-Oh! Go Rush!! is the seventh spin-off anime series in the Yu-Gi-Oh! franchise and the eighth anime series overall. On December 17, 2021, TV Tokyo announced that Yu-Gi-Oh! Go Rush!! would premiere on April 3, 2022, on TV Tokyo and BS TV Tokyo, with key staff members from Yu-Gi-Oh! Sevens returning for their respective positions: Nobuhiro Kondo is directing the series at Bridge, Toshimitsu Takeuchi is in charge of series' scripts, and Kazuko Tadano and Hiromi Matsushita are designing the characters.

An English dub of Go Rush!! premiered in the United States on Disney XD on January 11, 2025.

The series uses eight pieces of theme music: three opening themes and five ending themes. From episodes 1–51, the first opening theme is "Shinkirō" (蜃気楼) (Mirage) by Frederic while the ending theme is "One Way" by Yūsuke Saeki. From episodes 52–102, the second opening theme is "Soul Galaxy" by BRADIO while the ending theme is "Cosmos" by Taichi Mukai until episode 77. From episode 78 to 102, the third ending theme is "Song of Departure". From episodes 103 to 150, the third opening is "Let's Duel!" (デュエルしようぜ！, Dyueru shiyou ze!) by Masayoshi Oishi while the fourth ending theme is "STAR RUSH" (STAR(スター) RUSH(ラッシュ), Sutā Rasshu) by Ayaka Nanase until episode 127. From episode 128 to 150, the fifth ending theme is "It Won't Be Goodbye" (サヨナラにはならない, Sayonara ni wa Naranai) by Ayaka Nanase.

== Series overview ==
Season	Episodes	Originally released	
Season	Episodes	First released	Last released
1	51	April 3, 2022	March 26, 2023
2	51	April 2, 2023	March 24, 2024
3	49	April 7, 2024	March 30, 2025

== Episode list ==
=== Season 1 (2022–23) ===
No.	English dub title / Japanese translated title	Directed by	Written by	Storyboarded by	Original release date (Note: The series premiered on TV Tokyo on April 3 at 7:30 a.m. JST.)	American air date
1	"Meet the Ultraterrestrial Tracker Squad" / "This Is Ultraterrestrial Trouble Solutions!"; Transliteration: "Kochira Uchūjin Toraburu Sōdansha!" (Japanese: こちら宇宙人トラブル相談所!)	Masato Miyoshi	Toshimitsu Takeuchi	TBA	April 3, 2022	January 11, 2025
2	"The Secrecy" / "The Organization for Monitoring Interstellar Kriminals"; Transliteration: "Meiwaku Iseijin Kanshi Kikō" (Japanese: 迷惑異星人監視機構)	Shinya Sasaki	Toshimitsu Takeuchi	TBA	April 10, 2022	January 18, 2025
3	"The Kebobbery!" / "Be Afraid? The Blood-Sucking Alien"; Transliteration: "Kyōfu? Kyūketsu Uchūjin" (Japanese: 恐怖？吸血宇宙人)	Tomoya Takayama	Higuchi Tatsuto	TBA	April 17, 2022	January 25, 2025
4	"Trap Tutorial" / "The Chupacabra's Trap"; Transliteration: "Chupakabura no Wana" (Japanese: チュパカブラの罠)	Shinichi Fukumoto	Hiroshi Yamaguchi	TBA	April 24, 2022	February 1, 2025
5	"All Washed Up!" / "I'm Tell Kawai, and I'm Thirsty"; Transliteration: "Kawai Teru nda Yo" (Japanese: カワイテルンダヨ)	Yuto Nakamura	Yuichi Nomura	TBA	May 1, 2022	February 8, 2025
6	"Three Terrifying Tales" / "Whether You Believe It or Not Is Your Problem"; Transliteration: "Shinjiru ka Shinjinai ka wa Omae no Mondai" (Japanese: 信じるか信じないかはお前の問題)	Yuzo Sasaki	Kazuho Hyodo	TBA	May 8, 2022	February 15, 2025
7	"Training Troubles" / "Can You Name All the Monster Types?"; Transliteration: "Monsutā Shuzoku Ieru ka na?" (Japanese: モンスター種族言えるかな?)	Yuki Shiina	Aya Matsui	Kondo Nobuhiro	May 15, 2022	February 22, 2025
8	"Showdown with a Star!" / "Good Manya-rning from TV Land"; Transliteration: "Terebi no Kuni kara Manyanya Chiwa" (Japanese: テレビの国からマニャニャちわ)	Nao Yamada	Hiroshi Yamaguchi	Furuta Jouji	May 22, 2022	March 1, 2025
9	"Doggy Duel!" / "Bochi of the Graveyard"; Transliteration: "Hakaba no Bochi" (Japanese: 墓場ぼボチ)	Ryuta Yamamoto	Higuchi Tatsuto	Yamamoto Ryuta	May 29, 2022	March 8, 2025
10	"Earthdama Drama" / "Magical Sheep Girl Meeeg-chan"; Transliteration: "Mahō Yōjo Meegu-chan" (Japanese: 魔法羊女メェ～グちゃん)	Yasumi Mikamoto	Yuichi Nomura	Yamada Hiroyuki	June 5, 2022	March 15, 2025
11	"Testing Time!" / "Where's Zuwijo?"; Transliteration: "Zuwījou o Sagase!" (Japanese: ズウィージョウを捜せ！)	Takayama Tomoya	Yamaguchi Hiroshi	Mori Takeshi	June 12, 2022	March 22, 2025
12	"The Grand Plan" / "Earthdama"; Transliteration: "Āsudamā" (Japanese: アースダマー)	Fukumoto Shinichi	Takeuchi Toshimitsu	Hashimoto Naoto	June 19, 2022	March 29, 2025
13	"Wrath of the Requiem" / "Requiem of Fiction"; Transliteration: "Kyokō no Rekuiemu" (Japanese: 虚構のレクイエム)	Mizuno Kentaro	Takeuchi Toshimitsu	Komoto Shogo	June 26, 2022	April 5, 2025
14	"The Next Case" / "Client: London"; Transliteration: "Irainin Rondon" (Japanese: 依頼人ロンドン)	Sasaki Shinya	Hyodo Kazuho	Fujiwara Ryouji	July 3, 2022	April 12, 2025
15	"The Alien Underground" / "The Devil Wears Jersey"; Transliteration: "Jāji o Kita Akuma" (Japanese: ジャージを着た悪魔 –)	Sasaki Yuzo	Matsui Aya	Kondo Nobuhiro	July 10, 2022	April 19, 2025
16	"Sky Sky Sky" / "Duel Ghost"; Transliteration: "Dyueru no Bōrei" (Japanese: デュエルの亡霊)	Nakamura Yuto	Higuchi Tatsuto	Mori Takeshi	July 17, 2022	April 26, 2025
17	"The Info Broker" / Information, De-Sky? Transliteration: "Jōhō de Sukai?" (Japanese: 情報デスカイ?)	Komai Katsuyuki	Nomura Yuichi	Yamada Hiroyuki	July 24, 2022	May 3, 2025
18	"Eye See All" / The Great Prophecy of Nomurandamas; Transliteration: "Nomuratodamasu no Daiyogen" (Japanese: ノムラトダマスの大予言)	Watanabe Sumio	Yamaguchi Hiroshi	Furuta Jouji	July 31, 2022	May 10, 2025
19	"The Big Boss" / The Power of Cuteness? Transliteration: "Kawaii no Chikara?" (Japanese: カワイイの力?)	Takayama Tomoya	Hyodo Kazuho	Takayama Tomoya	August 7, 2022	May 17, 2025
20	"The Rovian Bandit" / Yuna Goha; Transliteration: "Gōha Yūna" (Japanese: ゴーハ・ユウナ)	Shiina Yuuki	Takeuchi Toshimitsu	Komoto Shogo	August 14, 2022	May 24, 2025
21	"Mission: Find Yudias" / Intruders Breaking the Ru-ru-ru-ru-rules; Transliteration: "Shinnyūsha Rūru Yabutterururururu" (Japanese: 侵入者ルール破ってルルルルル)	Miyoshi Masato	Higuchi Tatsuto	Kondo Nobuhiro	August 21, 2022	May 31, 2025
22	"The Queen of Powloon Castle" / The Queen of Badloon Castle; Transliteration: "Pāronjō no Joō" (Japanese: パーロン城の女王)	Fukumoto Shinichi	Higuchi Tatsuto	Hashimoto Naoto	August 28, 2022	June 7, 2025
23	"Ramen Rumble" / Hanako the Naruto; Transliteration: "Naruto no Hanako" (Japanese: ナルトの華子)	Unknown	Matsui Aya	TBA	September 4, 2022	June 14, 2025
24	"My Friend Got Turned into a T-Shirt" / Be Revived! Yudias; Transliteration: "Yomigaere! Yuudiasu" (Japanese: よみがえれ！ユウディアス)	Mizuno Kentaro	Yamaguchi Hiroshi	Mori Takeshi	September 11, 2022	June 21, 2025
25	"The Takeover" / UTS Under Attack; Transliteration: "Nerawareta Yū Tī Esu" (Japanese: 狙われたUTS)	Mikamoto Yasumi	Takeuchi Toshimitsu	Komoto Shogo	September 18, 2022	June 28, 2025
26	"Secret of the Space Treasure" / Fly! Rush Duel; Transliteration: "Tobe! Rasshu Dyueru" (Japanese: 翔べ！ラッシュデュエル)	Komai Katsuyuki	Takeuchi Toshimitsu	Kondo Nobuhiro	September 25, 2022	July 5, 2025
27	"How to Make a Cartoon" / It's Tough Making an Anime; Transliteration: "Anime wa Tsurai yo" (Japanese: アニメはつらいよ)	Yuzo Sasaki	Yuichi Nomura	Hashimoto Naoto	October 2, 2022	July 12, 2025
28	"Old School Duel" / Fight! UTS Eight; Transliteration: "Tatakae! Yū Tī Esu Eito" (Japanese: 闘え！UTSエイト)	Unknown	Higuchi Tatsuto	TBA	October 9, 2022	July 19, 2025
29	"Rubble Trouble" / Rocka-Dabba-Doo! Transliteration: "Ishidabadū!" (Japanese: イシダバドゥー！)	Unknown	Unknown	TBA	October 16, 2022	July 26, 2025
30	"The Redeem Queen" / Festival Queen; Transliteration: "Fesutibaru Kuīn" (Japanese: フェスティバルクイーン)	Unknown	Yamada Kenichi	TBA	October 23, 2022	August 2, 2025
31	"Remote Rush Duel"; Transliteration: "Rimōto Rasshu Dyueru" (Japanese: リモートラッシュデュエル)	Unknown	Matsui Aya	TBA	October 30, 2022	August 9, 2025
32	"Invasion! The Great King of Terror"; Transliteration: "Shūrai! Kyōfu no Daiō" (Japanese: 襲来！恐怖の大王)	Unknown	Ueno Kimiko	TBA	November 6, 2022	TBA
33	"Plastic World"; Transliteration: "Purachikku Wārudo" (Japanese: プラチック・ワールド)	Takayama Tomoya	Yamaguchi Hiroshi	Takayama Tomoya	November 13, 2022	TBA
34	"The☆Nyandestar"; Transliteration: "Za ☆ Nyande Sutā" (Japanese: ザ☆ニャンデスター)	Mikamoto Yasumi	Nomura Yuichi	Mori Takeshi	November 20, 2022	TBA
35	"London, Lies, and Cassette Tape"; Transliteration: "Rondon to Uso to Kasettotēpu" (Japanese: ロンドンと嘘とカセットテープ)	Mizuno Kentaro	Higuchi Tatsuto	Komoto Shogo	November 27, 2022	TBA
36	"Feelings I Want to Convey, Yei!"; Transliteration: "Todoketai Omoi Iei!" (Japanese: 届けたい想いイェイ！)	Song Shenda	Yamaguchi Hiroshi	Hashimoto Naoto	December 4, 2022	TBA
37	"Zuwijo the Dark"; Transliteration: "Ankoku no Zuījō" (Japanese: 暗黒のズウィージョウ)	Song Shenda	Yamaguchi Hiroshi	Yamada Hiroyuki	December 11, 2022	TBA
38	"The☆Lugh! The☆Lugh!"; Transliteration: "Za☆Rūgu Za☆Rūgu" (Japanese: ザ☆ルーグ・ザ☆ルーグ)	Watanabe Sumio	Takeuchi Toshimitsu	Kondo Nobuhiro	December 18, 2022	TBA
39	"That Guy from the Future"; Transliteration: "Mirai Kara Kita Aitsu" (Japanese: 未来からきたアイツ)	Sasaki Yuzo	Takeuchi Toshimitsu	Takayama Tomoya	December 25, 2022	TBA
40	"Chant Improvement Dojo"; Transliteration: "Kōjō Kōjō Dōjō" (Japanese: 口上向上道場)	Fukumoto Shinichi	Matsui Aya	Watanabe Shinichi	January 8, 2023	TBA
41	"The Miracle on Planet Pawtner"; Transliteration: "Nyakayoshi-sei no Kiseki" (Japanese: ニャカヨシ星の奇跡)	Komai Katsuyuki	Ueno Kimiko	Kondo Nobuhiro	January 15, 2023	TBA
42	"Shewbahha the Courier"; Transliteration: "Hakobiya Shūbahha" (Japanese: 運び屋シューバッハ)	Mikamoto Yasumi	Yamada Kenichi	Hashimoto Naoto	January 22, 2023	TBA
43	"Is It Okay if I Whisper to You?"; Transliteration: "Sasayaitemo Ī no Kai?" (Japanese: ささやいてもいいのかい)	Mizuno Kentaro	Nomura Yuichi	Kondo Nobuhiro	January 29, 2023	TBA
44	"Break Through the Encirclement!"; Transliteration: "Hōimō o Toppa Seyo!" (Japanese: 包囲網を突破せよ！)	Isowa Yuri	Higuchi Tatsuto	Miyoshi Masato	February 5, 2023	TBA
45	"A Fateful Choice"; Transliteration: "Unmei no Sentaku" (Japanese: 運命の選択)	Takayama Tomoya	Higuchi Tatsuto	Takayama Tomoya	February 12, 2023	TBA
46	"The Invaders from Planet Earth"; Transliteration: "Chikyū Kara no Shinryakusha" (Japanese: 地球からの侵略者)	Watanabe Sumio	Yamaguchi Hiroshi	Umino Namako	February 19, 2023	TBA
47	"I'm Damamu!"; Transliteration: "Boku-chin Damamū!" (Japanese: ボクちんダマムー！)	Komai Katsuyuki	Ueno Kimiko	Kondo Nobuhiro	February 26, 2023	TBA
48	"A Close Call on Planet Velgear"; Transliteration: "Berugyā-sei Kikiippatsu" (Japanese: ベルギャー星危機一髪)	Fukumoto Shinichi	Hyodo Kazuho	Watanabe Shinichi	March 5, 2023	TBA
49	"Yudias vs. Zuwijo"; Transliteration: "Yuudiasu tai Zuwījou" (Japanese: ユウディアス対ズウィージョウ)	Mikamoto Yasumi	Takeuchi Toshimitsu	Tsuchiya Akira	March 12, 2023	TBA
50	"Battleship Rush Duel"; Transliteration: "Senkan Rasshu Dyueru!" (Japanese: 戦艦ラッシュデュエル！)	Tomoya Takayama; Yuzo Sasaki	Takeuchi Toshimitsu	TBA	March 19, 2023	TBA
51	"Karutumata"; Transliteration: "Karutumāta" (Japanese: カルトゥマータ)	Komai Katsuyuki	Takeuchi Toshimitsu	Hashimoto Naoto	March 26, 2023	TBA

=== Season 2 (2023–24) ===
No. overall	No. in season	Title	Directed by	Written by	Storyboarded by	Original release date
52	1	"Yudias Returns"; Transliteration: "Kaettekita Yuudiasu!" (Japanese: 帰ってきたユウディアス！)	Mizuno Kentaro	Higuchi Tatsuto	Kondo Nobuhiro	April 2, 2023
53	2	"Yuhi: The Runaway Chronicles"; Transliteration: "Yūhi Yasagure Retsuden" (Japanese: 遊飛やさぐれ列伝)	Hishikawa Naoki	Nomura Yuichi	Hishikawa Naoki	April 9, 2023
54	3	"Yuna's Determination"; Transliteration: "Yūna no Ketsui" (Japanese: ユウナの決意)	Yamada Nao	Yamada Kenichi	Furuta Jouji	April 16, 2023
55	4	"Alien School #8"; Transliteration: "Dai-hachi Uchūjin Gakkō" (Japanese: 第８宇宙人学校)	Miyoshi Masato	Matsui Aya	Kondo Nobuhiro	April 23, 2023
56	5	"Yuhi's Road"; Transliteration: "Yūhi no Rōdo" (Japanese: 遊飛のロード)	Fukumoto Shinichi	Ueno Kimiko	Komoto Shogo	April 30, 2023
57	6	"Operation: Take Back the Surface"; Transliteration: "Chijō Dakkan Sakusen" (Japanese: 地上奪還作戦)	Takayama Tomoya	Yamaguchi Hiroshi	Takayama Tomoya	May 7, 2023
58	7	"The Commander Exposed"; Transliteration: "Hadaka no Sōsui" (Japanese: 裸の総帥)	Mikamoto Yasumi	Yamada Kenichi	Komoto Shogo	May 14, 2023
59	8	"Phaser's Secret"; Transliteration: "Feizā no Himitsu" (Japanese: フェイザーの秘密)	Sumio Watanabe	Hiroshi Yamaguchi	Akira Nishimori	May 21, 2023
60	9	"Yuamu's Road"; Transliteration: "Yuamu no Rōdo" (Japanese: 遊歩のロード)	Yasumi Mikamoto	Kenchi Yamada	Shogo Komoto	May 28, 2023
61	10	"Cat's Duel"; Transliteration: "Kyattsu Dyueru" (Japanese: キャッツデュエル)	Unknown	Kimiko Ueno	Shinichi Watanabe	June 4, 2023
62	11	"Reunion"; Transliteration: "Saikai" (Japanese: 再会)	Unknown	Toshimitsu Takeuchi	Naoto Hashimoto	June 11, 2023
63	12	"The Last Dragon Chronicles"; Transliteration: "Ryū no Sumu Ie" (Japanese: 竜の棲む家)	Unknown	Aya Matsui	Tomoya Takayama	June 18, 2023
64	13	"Those Who Are Born on the Star"; Transliteration: "Hoshi ni Umareta Mono-tachi" (Japanese: 星に生まれた者たち)	Unknown	Yuichi Nomura	Nobuhiro Kondo	June 25, 2023
65	14	"What's in the Box? Pu-Puku-Pu"; Transliteration: "Hako no Nakami wa Puppukupū" (Japanese: ハコの中身はプップクプー)	Unknown	Tatsuto Higuchi	TBA	July 2, 2023
66	15	"The Galaxy Cup Begins!"; Transliteration: "Kaimaku! Gyarakushī Kappu" (Japanese: 開幕！ギャラクシーカップ)	Unknown	Kenichi Yamada	TBA	July 9, 2023
67	16	"Sogetsu's Connections"; Transliteration: "Sōgetsu no Tsunagari" (Japanese: 蒼月のツナガリ)	Unknown	Hiroshi Yamaguchi	TBA	July 16, 2023
68	17	"The First Rush Duel"; Transliteration: "Hajimete no Rasshu Dyueru" (Japanese: はじめてのラッシュデュエル)	Unknown	Kimiko Ueno	TBA	July 23, 2023
69	18	"Tremolo vs. Dinois"; Transliteration: "Toremoro vs Dinowa" (Japanese: トレモロｖｓディノワ)	Unknown	Aya Matsui	TBA	July 30, 2023
70	19	"Attack of the Closet!"; Transliteration: "Kyōshū! Fanshī Kēsu" (Japanese: 強襲! ファンシーケース)	Unknown	Yuichi Nomura	TBA	August 6, 2023
71	20	"A Dream for Furniture"; Transliteration: "Kagu ni Kaketa Yume" (Japanese: 家具にかけた夢)	Unknown	Tatsuto Higuchi	TBA	August 13, 2023
72	21	"Vengeance is Mine"; Transliteration: "Fukushū suru wa Ware ni Ari" (Japanese: 復讐するはワレにあり)	Unknown	Kimiko Ueno	TBA	August 20, 2023
73	22	"Encroachment"; Transliteration: "Shinshoku" (Japanese: 侵食)	Unknown	Kenichi Yamada	TBA	August 27, 2023
74	23	"My Road"; Transliteration: "Atakushi no Rōdo" (Japanese: アタクシのロード)	Unknown	Hiroshi Yamaguchi	TBA	September 3, 2023
75	24	"Karutios Plan"; Transliteration: "Karutiosu Keikaku" (Japanese: カルティオス計画)	Unknown	Toshimitsu Takeuchi	TBA	September 10, 2023
76	25	"Proto-Velgear"; Transliteration: "Purotoberugyā" (Japanese: プロトベルギャー)	Unknown	Toshimitsu Takeuchi	TBA	September 17, 2023
77	26	"The Creator"; Transliteration: "Sōzōshu" (Japanese: 創造主)	Unknown	Toshimitsu Takeuchi	TBA	September 24, 2023
78	27	"Idiot Moment 88"; Transliteration: "Aho Taiken Hachijūhachi" (Japanese: アホ体験８８)	Unknown	Kimiko Ueno	TBA	October 1, 2023
79	28	"Kuaidul Spacetime"; Transliteration: "Kwaidūru Jikū" (Japanese: クァイドゥール時空)	Unknown	Yuichi Nomura	TBA	October 8, 2023
80	29	"Luxury Space Furniture Store Providence"; Transliteration: "Kōkyū uchū Kaguya Setsuri" (Japanese: 高級宇宙家具屋セツリ)	Unknown	Aya Matsui	TBA	October 15, 2023
81	30	"Storm Clouds Over Mutsuba Tower!"; Transliteration: "Fūun! Mutsuba Tawā" (Japanese: 風雲！ムツバタワー)	Unknown	Kenichi Yamada	TBA	October 22, 2023
82	31	"Ladybug Bakery"; Transliteration: "Tentōmushi no Panya" (Japanese: テントウムシのパン屋)	Unknown	Tatsuto Higuchi	TBA	October 29, 2023
83	32	"Hello, Baby!"; Transliteration: "Konnichiwa Aka-chan" (Japanese: こんにちは赤ちゃん)	Unknown	Hiroshi Yamaguchi	TBA	November 5, 2023
84	33	"The Jobless"; Transliteration: "Hatarakazaru Mono" (Japanese: 働かざる者)	Sumio Watanabe	Kimiko Ueno	Naoto Hashimoto	November 12, 2023
85	34	"Spacetime Classroom"; Transliteration: "Jikū Kyōshitsu" (Japanese: 時空教室)	Daiki Nishimura	Yuichi Nomura	Shinichi Watanabe	November 19, 2023
86	35	"The Kotatsu Revolt"; Transliteration: "Kotatsu no Ran" (Japanese: 炬燵の乱)	Kentaro Mizuno	Kenichi Yamada	Shogo Komoto	November 26, 2023
87	36	"What Will You Do, Yudias?"; Transliteration: "Dōsuru Yuudiasu" (Japanese: どうするユウディアス)	Yuzo Sasaki	Tatsuto Higuchi	Tomoya Takayama	December 3, 2023
88	37	"The Giant of Light"; Transliteration: "Hikari no Kyojin" (Japanese: 光の巨人)	Yasumi Mikamoto	Toshimitsu Takeuchi	Shogo Komoto	December 10, 2023
89	38	"Two Galaxies"; Transliteration: "Futatsu no Ginga" (Japanese: ふたつの銀河)	Nao Yamada	Toshimitsu Takeuchi	Nobuhiro Kondo	December 17, 2023
90	39	"One Galaxy"; Transliteration: "Hitsotsu no Ginga" (Japanese: ひとつの銀河)	Katsuyuki Komai	Toshimitsu Takeuchi	Nobuhiro Kondo	December 24, 2023
91	40	"Death to Spies"; Transliteration: "Supai ni wa Shi wo" (Japanese: スパイニハシヲ)	Naoki Hishikawa	Aya Matsui	Naoto Hashimoto	January 7, 2024
92	41	"The Birth of an Animal Star"; Transliteration: "Dōbutsu Sutā Tanjō" (Japanese: 動物スタァ誕生)	Shinichi Fukumoto	Hiroshi Yamaguchi	Takeshi Mori	January 14, 2024
93	42	"A Clockwork Zaion"; Transliteration: "Haguruma Jikake no Zaion" (Japanese: 歯車じかけのザイオン)	Tomoya Takayama	Kimiko Ueno	Tomoya Takayama	January 21, 2024
94	43	"The Gene of Princess"; Transliteration: "Purinsesu no Idenshi" (Japanese: プリンセスの遺伝子)	Akira Tsunoda	Tatsuto Higuchi	Nobuhiro Kondo	January 28, 2024
95	44	"Farewell, Tazaki"; Transliteration: "Saraba Tazaki" (Japanese: サラバ田崎)	Unknown	Yuichi Nomura	TBA	February 4, 2024
96	45	"The Bowl of Silence"; Transliteration: "Chinmoku no Donburi" (Japanese: 沈黙の丼)	Unknown	Kenichi Yamada	TBA	February 11, 2024
97	46	"The Stolen Robot"; Transliteration: "Ubawareta Robo" (Japanese: 奪われたロボ)	Unknown	Hiroshi Yamaguchi	TBA	February 18, 2024
98	47	"Extinction"; Transliteration: "Shōmetsu" (Japanese: 消滅)	Unknown	Aya Matsui	TBA	February 25, 2024
99	48	"The Last Cicada Samurai"; Transliteration: "Rasuto Semizamurai" (Japanese: ラストセミザムライ)	Unknown	Kimiko Ueno	TBA	March 3, 2024
100	49	"The Obstructor"; Transliteration: "Tachihadakaru Mono" (Japanese: 立ちはだかる者)	Unknown	Toshimitsu Takeuchi	TBA	March 10, 2024
101	50	"Resurrection of the Dead"; Transliteration: "Shisha Sosei" (Japanese: 死者蘇生)	Unknown	Toshimitsu Takeuchi	TBA	March 17, 2024
102	51	"There Is No Victor in Space"; Transliteration: "Shōshanaki Sora" (Japanese: 勝者なき宇宙)	Unknown	Toshimitsu Takeuchi	TBA	March 24, 2024

=== Season 3 (2024–25) ===
No. overall	No. in season	Title	Directed by	Written by	Storyboarded by	Original release date
103	1	"A Currygeous Journey Begins"; Transliteration: "Karei naru Tabidachi" (Japanese: 華麗なる旅立ち)	Unknown	Unknown	TBA	April 7, 2024
104	2	"Sa, Darkman"; Transliteration: "Sa, Dākumen" (Japanese: サ，ダークメン)	Unknown	Yuichi Nomura	TBA	April 14, 2024
105	3	"Captain Epoch"; Transliteration: "Kyaputen Epokku" (Japanese: キャプテンエポック)	Unknown	Tatsuto Higuchi	TBA	April 21, 2024
106	4	"My Mommy is Nyandestar"; Transliteration: "Mama wa Nyandesutā" (Japanese: ママはニャンデスター)	Unknown	Kenichi Yamada	TBA	April 28, 2024
107	5	"A Cheer from the Dark"; Transliteration: "Kurayami kara no Osu" (Japanese: 暗闇からの押忍)	Unknown	Kimiko Ueno	TBA	May 5, 2024
108	6	"Evacuation Zone"; Transliteration: "Tettai Ryōiki" (Japanese: 撤退領域)	Unknown	Hiroshi Yamaguchi	TBA	May 12, 2024
109	7	"Dark Meister"; Transliteration: "Dāku Maisutā" (Japanese: ダークマイスター)	Unknown	Aya Matsui	TBA	May 19, 2024
110	8	"It Is My Turn"; Transliteration: "Ware no tān" (Japanese: ワレのターン)	Unknown	Yuichi Nomura	TBA	May 26, 2024
111	9	"Darkman Zuwijo"; Transliteration: "Dākumen Zuwījou" (Japanese: ダークメン・ズウィージョウ)	Unknown	Tatsuto Higuchi	TBA	June 2, 2024
112	10	"Damamu's Right"; Transliteration: "Damamū no Kenri" (Japanese: ダマムーの権利)	Unknown	Hiroshi Yamaguchi	TBA	June 9, 2024
113	11	"Dark Matter Space"; Transliteration: "Dāku Matā Kūkan" (Japanese: ダークマター空間)	Unknown	Unknown	TBA	June 16, 2024
114	12	"Castle of Darkness"; Transliteration: "Yami no Shiro" (Japanese: 闇の城)	Unknown	Unknown	TBA	June 23, 2024
115	13	"Those Who Walk in the Dark"; Transliteration: "Yami o Aruku Mono" (Japanese: 闇を歩く者)	Unknown	Unknown	TBA	June 30, 2024
116	14	"That’s What Pisses Me Off about You!"; Transliteration: "Souiu Tokoro ga Mukatsukundayo!" (Japanese: そういう所がムカつくんだよ！)	Unknown	Unknown	TBA	July 14, 2024
117	15	"Mochi☆Pals"; Transliteration: "Mochi☆Tomo" (Japanese: モチ☆トモ)	Unknown	Unknown	TBA	July 21, 2024
118	16	"Toward the Earth"; Transliteration: "Chikyū e…" (Japanese: 地球へ…)	Unknown	Unknown	TBA	July 28, 2024
119	17	"DM Particles"; Transliteration: "DM Ryūshi" (Japanese: DM粒子)	Unknown	Unknown	TBA	August 4, 2024
120	18	"Ideals of the Leaders"; Transliteration: "Danchō no Omoi" (Japanese: 団長の思い)	Unknown	Unknown	TBA	August 11, 2024
121	19	"MIK of My Youth"; Transliteration: "Waga Seishun no MIK" (Japanese: わが青春のMIK)	Unknown	Unknown	TBA	August 18, 2024
122	20	"Gear Manga Kamijo-kun"; Transliteration: "Hagurumanga Kamijō-kun" (Japanese: はぐるまんが上城くん)	Unknown	Unknown	TBA	August 25, 2024
123	21	"Soy Sauce Revolution"; Transliteration: "Oshōyu Kakumei" (Japanese: オショーユ革命)	Unknown	Unknown	TBA	September 1, 2024
124	22	"Mask of Deception"; Transliteration: "Itsuwari no Kamen" (Japanese: 偽りの仮面)	Unknown	Unknown	TBA	September 8, 2024
125	23	"Road Holiday"; Transliteration: "Rōdo no Kyūjitsu" (Japanese: ロードの休日)	Unknown	Unknown	TBA	September 15, 2024
126	24	"Let the Living be Sealed into the Light"; Transliteration: "Seija wa Hikari ni Fūjirare" (Japanese: 生者は光に封じられ)	Unknown	Unknown	TBA	September 22, 2024
127	25	"The Dead Rise from the Darkness"; Transliteration: "Shisha wa Yami kara Yomigaeru" (Japanese: 死者は闇から蘇る)	Unknown	Unknown	TBA	September 29, 2024
128	26	"Carve a Road of Toil Through It All and Press Onward"; Transliteration: "Rōdō wo Kirihiraite Tsukisusume" (Japanese: 労働を切り開いて突き進め)	Unknown	Unknown	TBA	October 6, 2024
129	27	"The Insect Ninja Attack!"; Transliteration: "Konchū Ninja Raishū!" (Japanese: 昆虫忍者来襲！)	Unknown	Unknown	TBA	October 13, 2024
130	28	"White Hat and Massage Chair"; Transliteration: "Shiroi Bōshi to Massāji Chea" (Japanese: 白い帽子とマッサージチェア)	Unknown	Unknown	TBA	October 20, 2024
131	29	"Something"; Transliteration: "Samushingu" (Japanese: サムシング)	Unknown	Unknown	TBA	October 27, 2024
132	30	"A Cheer for Her Fated One!"; Transliteration: "Unmei no Osu!" (Japanese: 運命のオス！)	Unknown	Unknown	TBA	November 3, 2024
133	31	"The Name Is Otes"; Transliteration: "Sono Na wa Ōtisu" (Japanese: その名はオーティス)	Unknown	Unknown	TBA	November 10, 2024
134	32	"Tale of the Tiny Can"; Transliteration: "Chīsana Kan no Monogatari" (Japanese: 小さな缶の物語)	Unknown	Unknown	TBA	November 17, 2024
135	33	"Somewhere Similar to Here"; Transliteration: "Koko ni Nita Basho" (Japanese: ここに似た場所)	Unknown	Unknown	TBA	November 24, 2024
136	34	"The Door to That Guy"; Transliteration: "Aitsu e no Tobira" (Japanese: アイツへの扉)	Unknown	Unknown	TBA	December 1, 2024
137	35	"Dark Otes"; Transliteration: "Kuroi Ōtisu" (Japanese: 黒いオーティス)	Unknown	Unknown	TBA	December 8, 2024
138	36	"Time Power"; Transliteration: "Jikan Pawā" (Japanese: 時間パワー)	Unknown	Unknown	TBA	December 15, 2024
139	37	"Great Growth"; Transliteration: "Ōi Naru Seichō" (Japanese: 大いなる成長)	Unknown	Unknown	TBA	December 22, 2024
140	38	"Sengoku Rush Duel"; Transliteration: "Sengoku Rasshu Dyueru" (Japanese: 戦国ラッシュデュエル)	Unknown	Unknown	TBA	January 12, 2025
141	39	"Hey! Sogetsu Style"; Transliteration: "Hey! Sōgetsu-Ryū" (Japanese: Hey! 蒼月流)	Unknown	Unknown	TBA	January 19, 2025
142	40	"Princess of Beasts"; Transliteration: "Kedamono no Hime" (Japanese: けだものの姫)	Unknown	Unknown	TBA	January 26, 2025
143	41	"Usu and Dark"; Transliteration: "Usu to Kuro" (Japanese: 臼と黒)	Unknown	Unknown	TBA	February 2, 2025
144	42	"The Yudias Incident"; Transliteration: "Yuudiasu no Hen" (Japanese: ユウディアスの変)	Unknown	Unknown	TBA	February 9, 2025
145	43	"The Letter That Leapt Through Time"; Transliteration: "Toki o Kakeru Shojō" (Japanese: 時をかける書状)	Unknown	Unknown	TBA	February 16, 2025
146	44	"The Monk Who Can't Wait Until Tomorrow"; Transliteration: "Ashita Machikirenai Hōshi" (Japanese: 明日待ちきれない法師)	Unknown	Unknown	TBA	February 23, 2025
147	45	"Ten and Ran"; Transliteration: "Ten to Ran" (Japanese: 天と蘭)	Unknown	Unknown	TBA	March 2, 2025
148	46	"Moonlight Smile"; Transliteration: "Mūnraito Sumairu" (Japanese: ムーンライト・スマイル)	Unknown	Unknown	TBA	March 9, 2025
149	47	"Courage and Wings"; Transliteration: "Yūki to Tsubasa" (Japanese: 勇気と翼)	Unknown	Unknown	TBA	March 16, 2025
150	48	"An Otherworldly Final Duel"; Transliteration: "Chōjō Kessen Dyueru" (Japanese: 超常決戦デュエル)	Unknown	Unknown	TBA	March 23, 2025
151	49	"There Are Duelists Right Here"; Transliteration: "Dyuerisuto wa Koko ni Iru" (Japanese: 決闘者はここにいる)	Unknown	Unknown	TBA	March 30, 2025
