= Crystal Triangle =

1987 Japanese animated film

禁断の黙示録クリスタル・トライアングル (Kindan no Mokushiroku Kurisutaru Toraianguru)
- Genre: Adventure
- Original video animation
- Directed by: Seiji Okuda
- Produced by: Nageteru Kato; Yasuhisa Kazama; Yukio Nagasaki
- Written by: Junki Takegami
- Music by: Osamu Totsuka; Takeshi Ike
- Studio: Studio Live
- Released: July 1, 1987
- Runtime: 86 minutes
- icon

Crystal Triangle (Japanese: 禁断の黙示録クリスタル・トライアングル, Hepburn: Kindan no Mokushiroku Kurisutaru Toraianguru; literally "Forbidden Apocalypse Crystal Triangle") is a 1987 Japanese OVA.

== Plot ==
Koichiro Kamishiro is an assistant professor at a university who is highly regarded in the field of archaeology and travels around the world to find various antiquities as well as the "Message of God" which relates to the mysterious Hih Tribe. One day while investigating the ruins in the Middle East, he finds a strange cube-shaped stone despite running into several problems. While investigating the mysterious stone, he receives a visit from Miyabi Koto, the daughter of his former teacher. Initially, Kamishiro is not too keen on the idea, but after listening to Miyabi's story, he decides that it is well worth investigating and gets involved. However, he was unaware that this would lead to a major revelation involving the "Ten Commandments", a book of divine prophecy. As he along with Isao, Mina, Ginji, and Miyabi travel across Japan repeatedly running into the Japanese government, CIA, KGB, and even messengers of the Ten Commandments who will stop at no cost to get the Crystal Triangle back, he comes to a realization that the Crystal Triangle may contain the Message of God he was looking for, which is the potential 11th commandment that will prevent the Earth's destruction.

== Cast ==
- Masane Tsukayama: Koichiro Kamishiro
- Toshiko Fujita: Juno Cassidy
- Yusaku Yara: Grigori Yefimovich / Urga
- Yuriko Yamamoto: Miyabi Koto / Himiko
- Kazuki Yao: Isao Murakami
- Mayumi Sho: Mina Katsuki
- Ichiro Nagai: Kukai
- Seizō Katō: The Old Man of Hakodate
- Yuzuru Fujimoto: Hih Tribe Priest
- Norio Wakamoto: Ginji Iwagami
- Kan Tokumaru: Yoshioka
- Banjo Ginga: Dàrén
- Issei Futamata: Genpo
- Shinya Otaki: Numata
- Yuji Mikimoto: Ubanishad Master
- Michitaka Kobayashi: Minato
- Masaru Ikeda: Narrator

== Production ==
Crystal Triangle was released in Japan on VHS on July 1, 1987, and August 26, 1987, for its LaserDisc release. A DVD release by SME Visual Works (now Aniplex) was released on August 21, 2002. The anime was animated by Studio Live and was produced by Animate Film and Sony Music Entertainment Japan. Seiji Okuda handled the OVA's direction, while Toyoo Ashida and Kazuko Tadano were character designers in the OVA. The OVA was released in the U.S. on VHS and LaserDisc by Central Park Media under their U.S. Manga Corps label in 1993. The U.S. release has since gone out of print following Central Park Media's bankruptcy in 2009.

It is notorious for having an English version dubbed by the original Japanese voice actors, in a form of Engrish.
