= Yu-Gi-Oh! Go Rush!! =

Japanese anime television series

- 遊☆戯☆王ゴーラッシュ！！
- Based on: Yu-Gi-Oh!
- Developed by: Toshimitsu Takeuchi
- Directed by: Nobuhiro Kondo; Naoto Hashimoto (Note: Assistant director)
- Music by: Ryo Kawasaki; Emma Shimura; Tomoyuki Kono
- Country of origin: Japan
- Original language: Japanese
- No. of episodes: 151 (list of episodes)

Production
- Producers: Takahiko Aikawa; Akihiro Takatoku; Satoshi Umetsu
- Animator: Bridge
- Production companies: "Yu-Gi-Oh! GO-RUSH!!" Production Committee (Note: Label consisting of various companies.); TV Tokyo

Original release
- Network: TXN (TV Tokyo), BS TV Tokyo
- Release: April 3, 2022 – March 30, 2025

Related
- Manga
- Written by: Sugita Naoya
- Published by: Shueisha
- Magazine: Saikyo Jump
- Original run: April 4, 2022 – March 4, 2024
- Volumes: 4
- Other series
- List of all Yu-Gi-Oh! series; Yu-Gi-Oh! R
- Other media
- Video games; Trading card game

Yu-Gi-Oh! Go Rush!! (遊☆戯☆王ゴーラッシュ！！, Yū Gi Ō Gōrasshu!!), stylized as Yu-Gi-Oh! GO RUSH!!, is a Japanese anime series animated by Bridge. It is the seventh spin-off anime series in the Yu-Gi-Oh! franchise and set within the time frame of Yu-Gi-Oh! Sevens.

The series aired in Japan from April 3, 2022, to March 30, 2025.

== Plot ==
The series takes place an unknown amount of time in the past prior to the events of Yu-Gi-Oh! Sevens. Yuga Ohdo, the creator of Rush Dueling in Sevens, got transported to Mutsuba Town during his final duel with Otes and began working at the fledgling Goha Company led by Yuna Goha to recreate Rush Dueling. Yuhi and Yuamu, twin co-owners of an odds-jobs business called UTS, meet an alien named Yudias Velgear who came to Earth to understand Rush Dueling to lead his people to a better future. As the trio work together, they eventually become entangled in the mysterious ongoing war of Yudias' homeworld and the consequences of Yuga's actions and presence in the past.

== Media ==
=== Anime ===
On December 17, 2021, TV Tokyo announced that Yu-Gi-Oh! Go Rush!! would premiere on April 3, 2022, on TV Tokyo and BS TV Tokyo, with key staff members from Yu-Gi-Oh! Sevens returning for their respective positions: Nobuhiro Kondo directed the series at Bridge, with Toshimitsu Takeuchi in charge of series' scripts, and Kazuko Tadano and Hiromi Matsushita designing the characters. The series ended with the 151st episode on March 30, 2025. For episodes 1-51, the first opening theme is "Shinkirō" (蜃気楼) (Mirage) by Frederic while the ending theme is "One Way" by Yūsuke Saeki. For episodes 52–102, the second opening theme is "Soul Galaxy" by BRADIO while the ending theme is "Cosmos" by Taichi Mukai. For episodes 103–151, the third opening theme is "Let's Duel!" (デュエルしようぜ！, Dyueru shiyou ze!) by Masayoshi Oishi while the ending theme is "STAR RUSH" (STAR(スター) RUSH(ラッシュ), Sutā Rasshu) by Ayaka Nanase until episode 127, "STAR RUSH" was replaced with "It Won't Be Goodbye" (サヨナラにはならない, Sayonara ni wa Naranai) by Ayaka Nanase for episodes 128–150.

An edited English-language dub premiered in the United States on Disney XD on January 11, 2025. In the United Kingdom, the English dub of the first season was uploaded all at once on ITVX on December 8, 2025, and included 10 episodes that had yet to air in the United States. A month later, ITVX announced that they had acquired the rights for seasons two and three as well. Season two began on the service with 16 episodes released at once on August 11, 2026. Season two later premiered in the United States on Disney XD on October 3, 2026, with 17 episodes being added to Hulu and DisneyNOW on October 19, 2026.

=== Manga ===
On March 3, 2022, it was announced that Yu-Gi-Oh! Go Rush!! would be getting a manga in Saikyo Jump, written and illustrated by Sugita Naoya was released from April 4, 2022, to March 4, 2024.

| No. | Japanese release date | Japanese ISBN |
|---|---|---|
| 1 | December 2, 2022 | 978-4-08-883361-3 |
1. "A Duel with the Unknown!?" (未知との決闘!?, Michi to no Dyueru!?); 2. "Face-Down Trap!?" (裏側の罠!?, Uragawa no Torappu!?); 3. "The Strongest Summon!" (最強の召喚!, Saikyō no Shōkan!); 4. "It's Love, Love!" (愛だろ愛!, Aidaro Ai!); 5. "True Peace!!" (真の平和!!, Shin no Heiwa!!); 6. "Conclusion!!" (決着!!, Ketchaku!!)
| 2 | June 2, 2023 | 978-4-08-883576-1 |
7. "MIK!" (MIK!, Emuaikē!); 8. "Underground Residential Area!" (地下居住区!, Chikakyojūku!); 9. "Sky!" (デ・スカイ！, De Sukai!); 10. "Rovian Bandits!!" (ロヴィアン盗賊団！！, Rovian Tōzokudan!!); 11. "The Singer" (吟う者, Utau Mono); 12. "The Power of Bonds" (キズナの力, Kizuna no Chikara)
| 3 | December 4, 2023 | 978-4-08-883769-7 |
13. "Doubt" (疑い, Utagai); 14. "Luug" (ルーグ, Rūgu); 15. "Of Terror..." (恐怖の…, Kyōfu no...); 16. "Serious Game" (真剣勝負, Shinken Shōbu); 17. "The Great King is Coming" (大王来る, Daiō Kitaru); 18. "True Ace!" (真のエース！, Shin no Ēsu!)
| 4 | June 4, 2024 | 978-4-08-884084-0 |
19. "That Guy" (アイツ, Aitsu); 20. "Undercover Investigation" (潜入捜索, Sen'nyū Sōsaku); 21. "Yuamu's Determination" (遊歩の決意, Yuamu no Ketsui); 22. "Time of Trial" (試練の時, Shiren no Toki); 23. "God Versus God" (神VS神, Goddo Bāsasu Goddo); 24. "Friends Forever" (ずっと仲間だ, Zutto Nakama da)

=== Trading Card Game ===
In the main-line card game, Illusion-type monsters were introduced in April 2023 with the release of the set Duelist Nexus. No new summoning mechanics or Master Rules were added.

==== Rush Duels ====
A new monster Type for Rush Duels was introduced with the advent of the anime, named Galaxy. It is used by the protagonist, Yudias.

In August 2022, a new mechanic for Rush Duels debuted in the anime, known as Equip Spells. They were later released in October. These function similar to Equip Spells from the main game.

Following a rule update in January 2023, unofficially called "Rush Master Rule 2", players are now allowed to use one Legend card per Card Type in a deck (one Spell, one Trap, and one Monster).

The Rush Duel format was added worldwide to Yu-Gi-Oh! Duel Links beginning September 28, 2023. A world based on Go Rush!! was added to the game in late 2024.
