= Kazuko Tadano =

Japanese animator (born 1959)

- 只野 和子
- Born: March 14, 1959 (age 67); Hiroshima, Japan
- Other names: KAZZ; KAZZ-T
- Occupations: Animator, Character Designer, Illustrator, Animation Director
- Years active: 1980–present
- Notable work: Sailor Moon (Season 1, 2 & R the Movie); Wedding Peach; Sailor Moon Crystal (Eternal, Cosmos); Yu-Gi-Oh! (Sevens & Go Rush!!)
- Spouse: Hiromi Matsushita

Japanese name
- Kanji: 只野 和子
- Hiragana: ただの かずこ
- Katakana: タダノ カズコ
- Romanization: Tadano Kazuko

Kazuko Tadano (Japanese: 只野 和子, Hepburn: Tadano Kazuko; born March 14, 1959) is a Japanese animator, character designer, illustrator and animation director. She's mostly known for her character design work for the first two seasons of the 1990s Sailor Moon anime series.

== Career ==
Tadano first worked as an animation director for an episode of 1980s Saint Seiya anime. She then became a character designer for Dancouga – Super Beast Machine God, and Crystal Triangle.

In the 1990s, after working on various episodes for Goldfish Warning!, she then became a character designer for the first two seasons of the Sailor Moon anime series (Sailor Moon and Sailor Moon R), and provided some animation direction for many episodes. She also provided the designs for its first movie, Sailor Moon R: The Movie.

From the late 1990s to 2000s, after Sailor Moon, she designed the characters for Wedding Peach, Petite Princess Yucie, Jūsō Kikō Dancouga Nova, Valkyria of the Battlefield 3: The Wound Taken from Someone's Sake, and Nobunagun.

In June 2018, it was announced that Tadano was chosen as a character designer for Pretty Guardian Sailor Moon Eternal The Movie, a two-part anime film project that takes place as a "fourth season" for the Pretty Guardian Sailor Moon Crystal anime series, adapting the Dream arc of the manga. The two-part film was released in 2021.

In December 2019, both Tadano and her husband, Hiromi Matsushita, were chosen as character designers for the sixth spin-off of the Yu-Gi-Oh! Duel Monsters anime series, Yu-Gi-Oh! Sevens. In December 2021, Tadano and Matsushita were chosen as character designers again for the seventh spin-off, Yu-Gi-Oh! Go Rush!!.

In April 2022, it was announced that Tadano will design the characters for Sailor Moon Eternal's sequel, titled Pretty Guardian Sailor Moon Cosmos The Movie, another two-part anime film project that takes place as a "fifth and final season" for the Pretty Guardian Sailor Moon Crystal anime series, adapting the Stars arc of the manga, and was released in June 2023.

== Personal life ==
She married Hiromi Matsushita, who was also an animation director on Sailor Moon.

Her favorite hobbies are going to karaoke, traveling, and her dislikes are exercising, though she prefers to walk.

== Works ==
=== TV Anime ===
Year	Show	Credit	Note
1985	Dancouga – Super Beast Machine God	Character Design (Shinobu, Masato, Laura), Animation Director (eps. 4, 19, 24), Key Animation (eps. 2, 17)	
1986	Saint Seiya	Animation Director (eps. 65)	
1989	Time Travel Tondekeman	Key Animation (eps. 18), Sub-Character Design (eps. 1–5, 12, 24, 30, 33)	
1991–1992	Goldfish Warning!	Animation Director (eps. 14, 19, 25, 30, 35, 40, 43, 50)	
1992–1993	Sailor Moon	Character Design, Animation Director (eps. 6, 12, 17, 21, 28, 34, 39, 46)	
1993–1994	Sailor Moon R	Character Design, Animation Director (eps. 53, 58, 64, 69, 88), Key Animation (eps. 53)	
1995–1996	Wedding Peach	Character Design	
2002–2003	Petite Princess Yucie	Character Design, Animation Director (OP), Key Animation (eps. 8, 25)	
2003	The World of Narue	Eyecatch Illustration	
2004	Sgt. Frog	Key Animation (eps. 58)	
2007	Dancouga Nova – Super God Beast Armor	Character Design	Under the name of "KAZZ"
2011	Hunter x Hunter	Key Animation (eps. 23, 31, 38, 45, 53, 75, 81)	
2014	Nobunagun	Character Design	Under the name "KAZZ-T"
2014–2015	Mysterious Joker	Animation Director (eps. 13, 19, 24, 26)	
2017	The Royal Tutor	Chief Animation Director (eps. 3, 11–12)	
2018	Muhyo & Roji's Bureau of Supernatural Investigation	Chief Animation Director	
2020–2022	Yu-Gi-Oh! Sevens	Character Design, Chief Animation Director (OP1, ED1; eps. 1, 4, 10, 17, 23, 31, 43, 53, 67, 92), Animation Director (eps. 1, 10, 17, 23, 31, 43, 53, 67, 77, 92), Key Animation (OP1, ED1; eps. 1, 4, 10, 17, 23, 31, 43, 53, 67, 77, 92)	Co-character design with Hiromi Matsushita
2020	Muhyo & Roji's Bureau of Supernatural Investigation Season 2	Chief Animation Director, Animation Director (eps. 1), Key Animation (eps. 1, 6)	
2022–2025	Yu-Gi-Oh! Go Rush!!	Character Design, Chief Animation Director (OP1-3, ED1-5; eps. 1, 17, 22, 26, 32, 38, 46, 48, 52, 58, 77, 79, 85, 90, 102, 128), Animation Director (OP1-3, ED2-5; eps. 17, 38, 46, 52, 119, 128), 2nd Key Animation (ED5), Key Animation (OP1-2, ED3-5; eps. 38, 41, 46, 52)	Co-character design with Hiromi Matsushita
2026	The Insipid Prince's Furtive Grab for the Throne	Character Design	

=== Anime Film ===
Year	Title	Credit	Note
1983	Choro Q Dougram	Character design, Animation Director	9 minute short film
1993	Sailor Moon R: The Movie	Character Design, Animation Director	
2021	Pretty Guardian Sailor Moon Eternal The Movie	Character Design, Chief Animation Director (Part 1)	2-Part Film; Season 4 of Sailor Moon Crystal (Dead Moon arc)
2023	Pretty Guardian Sailor Moon Cosmos The Movie	Character Design	2-Part film Season 5 of Sailor Moon Crystal (Shadow Galactica arc)

=== OVA (Original Video Animation) ===
Year	Title	Credit	Note
1985	Vampire Hunter D	Key Animation	
1987	Crystal Triangle	Character Design	
1995	Graduation	Character Design	
1996-1997	Wedding Peach DX	Character Design	
2011	Valkyria of the Battlefield 3: The Wound Taken from Someone's Sake	Character Design, Chief Animation Director	
