= Yu-Gi-Oh! Sevens =

Japanese anime television series

- 遊☆戯☆王SEVENS
- Based on: Yu-Gi-Oh!
- Developed by: Toshimitsu Takeuchi
- Directed by: Nobuhiro Kondo
- Music by: Ryo Kawasaki
- No. of episodes: 92 (Note: Only 89 episodes were aired internationally.) (list of episodes)

Production
- Producers: Takahiko Aikawa; Akihiro Takatoku; Kosuke Kazuno
- Animator: Bridge
- Production companies: "Yu-Gi-Oh! SEVENS" Production Committee (Note: Label consisting of various companies.); TV Tokyo

Original release
- Network: TXN (TV Tokyo), BS TV Tokyo
- Release: April 4, 2020 – March 27, 2022

Related
- Manga

Yu-Gi-Oh! Sevens: Boku no Road Gakuen
- Written by: Megumi Sasaki
- Published by: Shueisha
- Magazine: Saikyō Jump
- Published: August 4, 2020
- Manga

Yu-Gi-Oh! SEVENS Luke! Explosive Supremacy Legend!!
- Written by: Hikokubo Masahiro
- Illustrated by: Sugie Tasuku
- Published by: Shueisha
- Magazine: V Jump
- Original run: September 19, 2020 – March 19, 2022
- Volumes: 3
- Other series
- List of all Yu-Gi-Oh! series; Yu-Gi-Oh! R
- Other media
- Video games; Trading card game

Yu-Gi-Oh! Sevens (遊☆戯☆王SEVENS, Yū Gi Ō Sebunsu), stylized as Yu-Gi-Oh! SEVENƧ, is a Japanese anime series animated by Bridge that aired in Japan on TV Tokyo from April 4, 2020, to March 27, 2022. It is the sixth spin-off anime series in the Yu-Gi-Oh! franchise, following Yu-Gi-Oh! VRAINS, and commemorates the 20th anniversary of the Yu-Gi-Oh! Duel Monsters anime series.

The series was followed by Yu-Gi-Oh! Go Rush!!, which premiered on April 3, 2022.

== Synopsis ==
The series takes place in the futuristic town of Goha and stars Yuga Ohdo, a fifth-grade elementary school student who loves inventions and dueling. Feeling that the current rules of the Duel Monsters card game are too stifling, Yuga successfully manages to install a new set of rules of his own creation known as "Rush Duel", allowing for more fast-paced and frantic dueling. The series follows Yuga and his friends as they show off the delights of Rush Duels while under the watchful eye of the Goha Corporation that oversees the city.

The series begins as Yuga unsuccessfully tries to create a new type of Duel called Rush Duel. As a result, he is late to school and Gavin Sogetsu, a member of the student council, tells Yuga that, next time, he will be punished. After learning from his best friend Lucidien "Luke" Kallister about the legend of the King of Duels, Yuga, suspecting that Otes was the King of Duels, Dueled him. Following his victory, Yuga's Rush Duels were created and he befriended Gavin.

Rush Duels allow Yuga to befriend many people, including Romin Kassidy. Goha, unhappy about Rush Duels, sent people to stop them, but they failed and instead befriended Yuga.

Later in the series, The Lukeman appears and wins Duels for Yuro, one of the Goha Six. He is ultimately defeated by Yuga, who promised to work for Goha if Yuro made his siblings presidents again.

After Yuga joined Goha, his friends suspected that he is one of the Goha Six, since there were only five members. Later, Luke's friend Swirls is revealed to be Yuga Goha, who wanted to make Dueling miserable and was brainwashing people. He later Dueled Otes, who is revealed to be the main villain after revealing his evil plans to destroy Dueling. Yuga Dueled Otes in space and risked his life to save Dueling, leaving him stranded in space.

Two years later, something powerful was entering the Earth's atmosphere. Yuga's friends and family went to the area of its expected landing, believing Yuga had found his way out of space and back to Earth.

== Media ==
=== Anime ===
Yu-Gi-Oh! Sevens was first announced as a then-untitled new anime series in the Yu-Gi-Oh! franchise on July 21, 2019. The series marked the second studio turnover in franchise history, with Bridge taking over as head studio in animation production from Gallop, which oversaw all television series and films in the franchise since Yu-Gi-Oh! Duel Monsters in 2000. The series is being directed by Nobuhiro Kondo, with screenplay by Toshimitsu Takeuchi and character designs by Kazuko Tadano and Hiromi Matsushita. It began airing in Japan on April 4, 2020, on TV Tokyo.

On April 28, 2020, it was announced that, after episode 5, the remaining episodes would be delayed for five weeks due to the effects of the COVID-19 pandemic. On July 10, 2020, it was announced that it would be delayed again due to the aforementioned pandemic and resumed on August 8, 2020.

An edited English dub began production in early 2021, and premiered in the United States on Disney XD on June 6, and Hulu on June 7, 2022, to December 2, 2023. Three episodes were removed from the English version, leaving 89 episodes compared to the original 92.

=== Manga ===
A comedy spin-off manga adaptation, titled Yu-Gi-Oh! Sevens: Boku no Road Gakuen (My Road Academy), written and illustrated by Megumi Sasaki, launched in the September issue of Saikyo Jump on August 4, 2020.

Another manga adaptation, written by Masahiro Hikokubo and illustrated by Tasuku Sugie, titled Yu-Gi-Oh! Sevens: Rook! Bakuretsu Hadō Den!! (遊☆戯☆王SEVENS ルーク!爆裂覇道伝!!; "Yu-Gi-Oh! SEVENS Luke! Explosive Supremacy Legend!!") was serialized in V Jump from September 19, 2020, to March 19, 2022. Shueisha collected its chapters in three tankōbon volumes, released from April 30, 2021, to May 2, 2022.

No.	Title	Japanese release date	Japanese ISBN
1	The Man Who Will Become King of Duels; Dyueru no Ō ni naru Otoko (デュエルの王(おう)になる男(おとこ))	April 30, 2021	978-4-08-882646-2
1. "The Man Who Will Become King of Duels" (デュエルの王おうになる男おとこ, Dyueru no Ō ni Naru Otoko); 2. "The Man Who Was Loved Too Much by Dragons" (ドラゴンに愛され過ぎた男, Doragon ni Aisare Sugita Otoko); 3. "The Cursed Man" (呪われた男, Norowareta Otoko); 4. "The Man Who Babbled" (バブってた男, Babutteta Otoko); 5. "The Man of Zero" (0の男, Zero no Otoko); 6. "The Journeying Man" (旅立つ男Tabidatsu Otoko)
2	The Man Who Rebels Against Providence; Setsuri ni Hansuru Otoko (セツリに反する男)	November 4, 2021	978-4-08-882832-9
7. "The Remodeling Man" (改造する男, Kaizōsuru Otoko); 8. "The Man Who Rides the Waves" (波に乗る男, Nami ni Noru Otoko); 9. "The Man Who Encountered the Unknown" (未知と遭遇した男, Michi to Sōgūshita Otoko); 10. "The Man Who Sits on the Throne" (玉座に腰掛ける男, Gyokuza ni Koshikakeru Otoko); 11. "The Man Who Yells "Big Senior" Amidst the Providence" (セツリの中心で大パイセンを叫ぶ男, Setsuri no Chūshin de Daipaisen o Sakebu Otoko); 12. "The Man Who Rebels Against Providence" (セツリに反する男, Setsuri ni Hansuru Otoko)
3	The Man Who Keeps Dueling; Dyueru-shi Tsuzukeru Otoko (決闘し続ける男)	May 2, 2022	978-4-08-883113-8
13. "The Ant-ertainment Man" (接待アリな男, Settai-ari na Otoko); 14. "The Man Who Got Carried Away" (調子に乗った男, Chōshi ni Notta Otoko); 15. "The Man Who Turned Down a Duel" (デュエルを断った男, Dyueru o Kotowatta Otoko); 16. "The Astutely Blessed Man" (ちゃっかり持ってる男, Chakkari Motteru Otoko); 17. "The Mean-Spirited Man" (いじわるな男, Ijiwaru na Otoko); 18. "The 'The Truth Is...' Man" (本当は･･･な男, Hontō wa... na Otoko); 19. "The Man Who Keeps Dueling" (決闘し続ける男, Dyueru-shi Tsuzukeru Otoko)

=== Trading Card Game ===
The year that Yu-Gi-Oh! Sevens premiered, the Yu-Gi-Oh! Trading Card Game announced an update to the Master Rules, unofficially called "Master Rule 5". Effective April 1, 2020, in Japan and November 24, 2021, in North America, it is now possible to Fusion, Synchro, or Xyz Summon directly to the Main Monster Zones without a required Link Arrow pointing to it. Pendulum and Link Monsters, however, retain their previous rules. Furthermore, several alterations to card rulings were made exclusively to the OCG.

==== Rush Duels ====
No new card mechanics were introduced into the main card game. Instead, a new format separate from the main game was introduced exclusively for the Japanese and Korean market named Rush Duels. Normal Summoning is unlimited, though Tribute Summon rules for Level 5 or higher monsters still apply. All card effects are "soft" once per turn, meaning a card's effect can be used once per copy. If a player can summon or use another copy of the same card, they may use its effect again. Card effects are now sectioned into "Requirement" and "Effect" boxes for easier reading. Players can only use cards designed for Rush Duels, which have a special frame and a "RUSH DUEL" tag at the bottom of the card. Rush Duels also uses its own exclusive card pool with many cards not found in the main game. Certain imported cards from the main game are known as "Legend Cards". Each player is allowed up to three Legend Cards in their deck, one of each type of card (monster, spell, trap).

Although the physical card game for Rush Duels is exclusive to the Asian markets, the format had been made available worldwide on digital formats through the Western release for the game Yu-Gi-Oh! Rush Duel: Dawn of the Battle Royale!!. The format was also added to the global release of Yu-Gi-Oh! Duel Links starting in September 2023.

== Reception ==
Mellisa Camacho gave a mixed review of the series for Common Sense Media, giving the series a rating of 3 out of 5 stars, and writing that younger kids "may find what's happening a little confusing at times" but the anime is "lively enough to be entertaining."
